= Lika (disambiguation) =

Lika is a historic region of Croatia. Lika can also refer to:

== Geography ==
- Sanjak of Lika, a province (sanjak) of the Ottoman Empire during the 16th and 17th centuries
- Lika (river), in the eponymous region of Croatia

== People ==
- Lika (name), a list of people with the given name or surname
- Lika MC, Russian-Lithuanian musician

== Other uses ==
- SMS Lika, an Austro-Hungarian Navy World War I destroyer sunk by mines in 1915
- SMS Lika (1917), an Austro-Hungarian Navy World War I destroyer
- Lika sheep, a Croatian breed of sheep
- Lika language, a Bantu language in the Democratic Republic of the Congo

== See also ==
- Lyka (disambiguation)
- Laika (disambiguation)
