= Russo-European Laika =

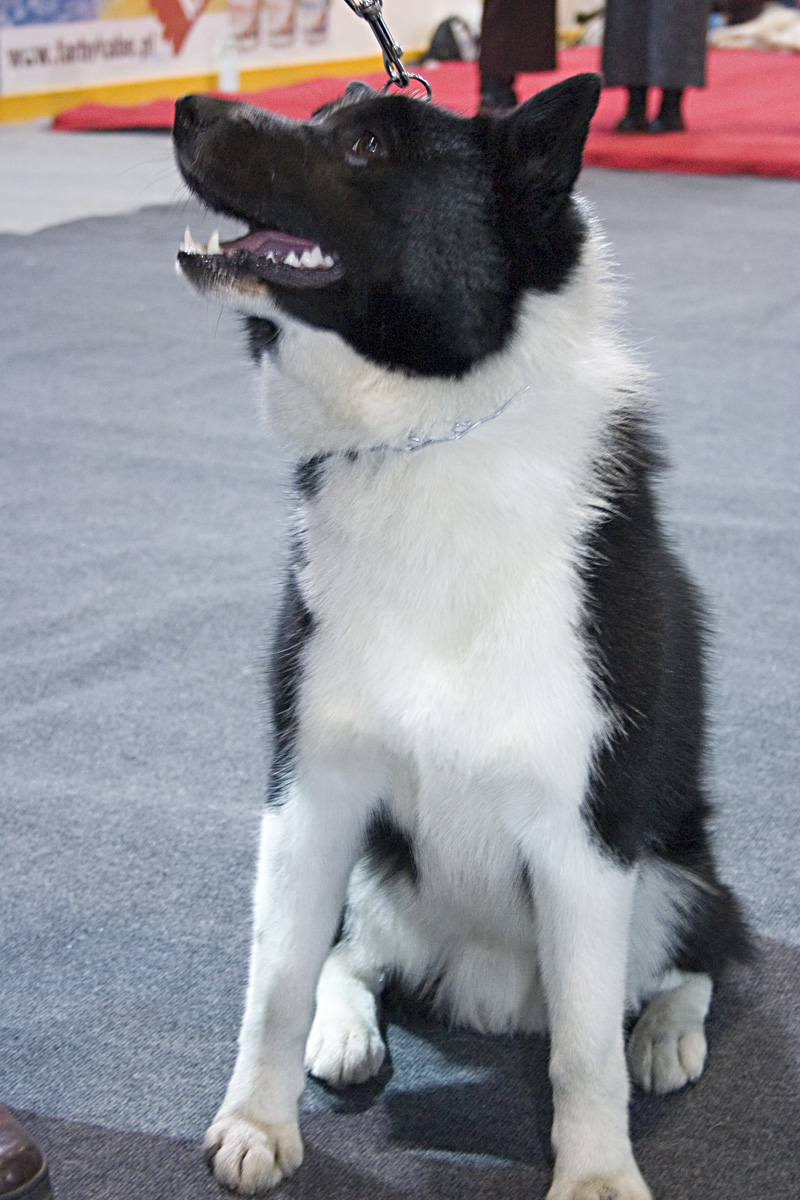
- Black, grey, white, pepper and salt, dark with white patches, white with dark patches are all acceptable colours
- Other names: Russko-Evropeĭskaya Laĭka
- Common nicknames: Laĭka
- Origin: European part of Russia
Kennel club standards
- Fédération Cynologique Internationale: standard

Russo-European Laika (Russko-Evropeĭskaya Láĭka) is the name of a breed of hunting dog that originated in the forested regions of north-eastern Europe, one of several breeds developed from landrace Laika dogs of Spitz type. The Russo-European Laika itself dates to a breeding program begun in 1944 by E. I. Shereshevsky of the All-Union Research Institute for the Hunting Industry, in Kalinin (now Tver) Province.

== Breed recognition ==
The Russo-European Laika is recognized by the Fédération Cynologique Internationale in the Spitz and Primitive types/Section 2: Nordic Hunting Dogs Group. The breed is listed along with two other Russian dogs, the East Siberian Láĭka and the West Siberian Láĭka.

== Breed standard ==
The Russo-European Laika is described as being of medium size, males being about 54 to 60 centimetres (21 to 24 in) at the withers and females about 52 to 58 centimetres (20 to 23 in). The breed has prick ears and a sickle tail carried over the back. Temperament should be non aggressive. Colour can be any of the normal Spitz-type colours, but red and ticking on the legs is undesirable.

== Temperament ==
The Russo-European Laika is a lively breed that enjoys time spent in the wilderness. As a natural hunter that frequently trees game, the Russo-European Laika uses its bark to alert the hunter to any treed prey (typically a raccoon or squirrel). The Russo-European Laika is also an excellent dog for duck hunting. It may often bark freely in the house as well because it is easily excited from its natural instinct. The Russo-European Laika has a strong love of humans and makes a good family dog. Once bonded to someone, it is quite territorial and makes an excellent guard dog. It is extremely tolerant of children, although not of other unfamiliar dogs or other animals.

Russo-European Laikas are described as high energy and willing to please, as such, training is required at a young age. Russo-European Laikas also require socialization and obedience training or a working job as they are typically quite social and active.

== Exercise ==
The Russo-European Laika requires plenty of exercise, especially when running free and hunting. Without enough activity, it will suffer from boredom and may become destructive.

== See also ==
- List of dog breeds
- Spitz
- Laika
