= Zerdava =

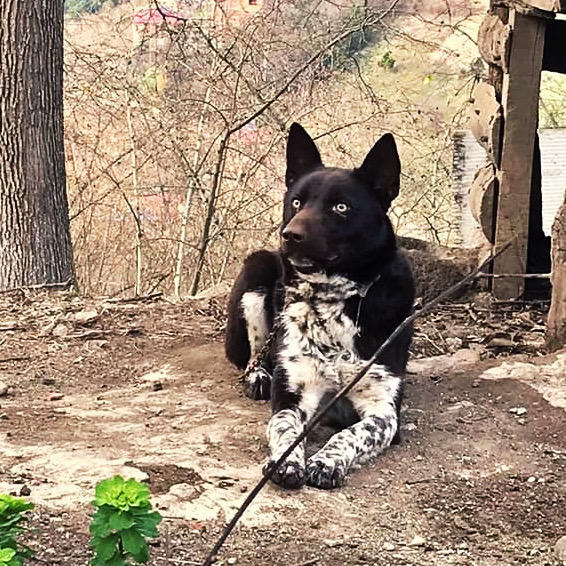
- Other names: Black Sea Spitz, Kapi Kopegi, Laz Kopegi, Gürcu Kopegi, Turkish Laika, Mekverna
- Common nicknames: The Gate Dog
- Origin: Turkey, Georgia
Traits
Weight	Males	17 kg
	Females	11–13 kg
- Coat: Double
- Colour: Solid liver, liver and white, liver roan
- Litter size: 5
Kennel club standards

The Zerdava (Georgian: მეკვერნე) is an aboriginal laika dog breed native to the Black Sea region of Turkey and Georgia. Zerdava are traditionally used as guard and hunting dogs and are especially prized for boar hunting. The name “Zerdava” is Slavic for mustelid, possibly in reference to their Marten-brown color or their treeing behavior when hunting martens.

== History ==
There exists very little written evidence on the origin of the Zerdava in Turkey and Georgia. The most probable explanation is that hunting laika were acquired by trade from Russia, as Baltic and Black Sea ports were the primary routes of Russian Fur trade into Europe and parts of Asia though the early Middle Ages. Zerdava have been documented in the Eastern Black Sea region for at least a hundred years, especially in the Trabzon and Giresun provinces of Turkey.

== Characteristics ==
Native region of Zerdava dogs

=== Appearance ===
Zerdava are a spitz breed with a compact, athletic body, triangular, upright ears, and a curved tail. They have a double coat that is always either solid liver brown or a combination of liver and white, such as liver and white-ticked, piebald, ticked, or liver roan. The brown is described as marten-like in color. At birth, they are often nearly black in color and their white sections are without ticking. Zerdava have brown noses and yellow-brown eyes. Their sickle shaped tails are usually white tipped and any brown spots will be the same shade of brown as the rest of their body.

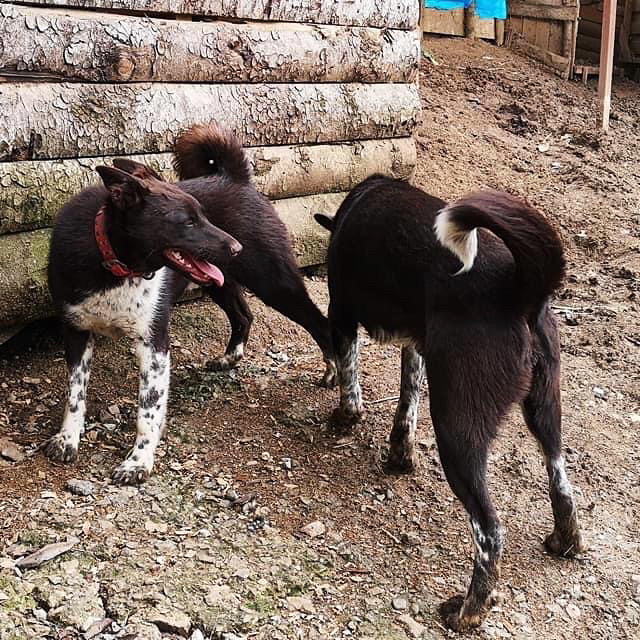
Two Zerdava in Turkey

=== Behavior ===
As is typical with laikas, zerdava are hardy and versatile hunters, capable of hunting game of a variety of sizes; they are known to tree small game, stalk large prey silently until cornered, and work in teams to corner jackals, bear, and boar. They are especially prized for their ability to avoid injury while hunting boar, a major pest to corn farmers. Zerdava have had considerable success as search and rescue dogs.

They are devoted to their humans and distrust strangers, earning them the nickname “the Gate Dog” for their excellent capabilities as a watchdog. Puppies need considerable socialization with people to avoid overly shy or aggressive behavior. Zerdava often struggle with being rehomed and will try to escape and find their original owner.

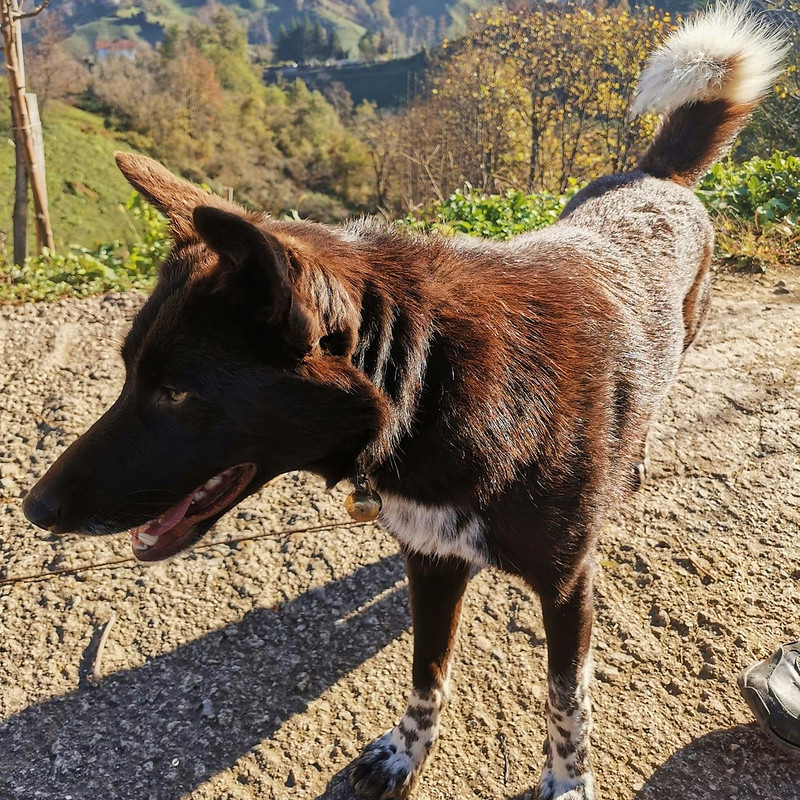
Zerdava in Trabzon, Turkey

Starting in 2016, Turkish Armed Force has been training Zerdava for a variety of military uses including bomb and narcotic detection, search and rescue, and personnel detention.

== Health ==
Zerdava are prized for their excellent health in harsh conditions with minimal care. Like other laika, it is more common for the females to go into estrus only once a year.

The population in Georgia is critically endangered due to frequent inbreeding. There are estimated to only be 15 to 20 purebred dogs left, with experts agreeing that the only way to stabilize the population is by importing dogs from Turkey.
