= Leica =

Leica may refer to:

== Companies ==
- Ernst Leitz GmbH, later divided into:
  - Leica Biosystems GmbH, a cancer diagnostics company
  - Leica Camera AG, a German camera and optics manufacturer
  - Leica Geosystems AG, a Swiss manufacturer of surveying and geomatics equipment
  - Leica Microsystems GmbH, a German manufacturer of microscopes and other precision optics

== Other uses ==
- "Leica", a song from the album Akeldama by Faceless
- Leica (river), Romania
- Leica reel, a type of animatic production method for animation

== See also ==
- Laika (disambiguation)
- Lieka, a former settlement in Ethiopia
