= Laika (dog type) =

Russian dog breeds

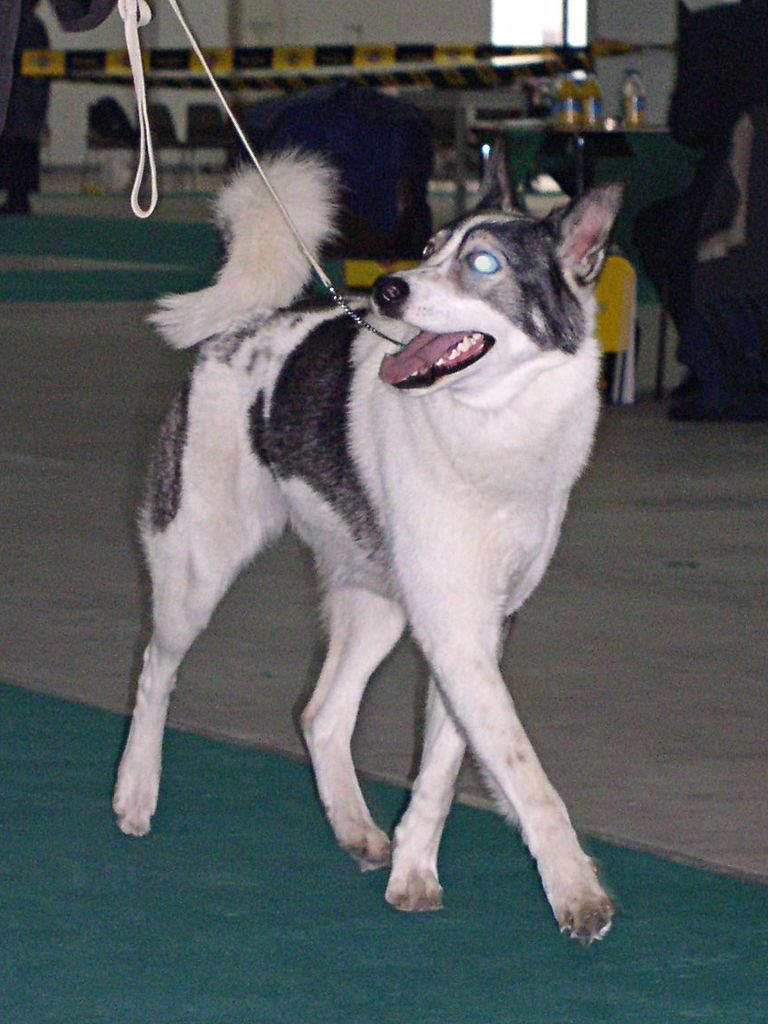
- East Siberian Laika
- Origin: Russia

Laika (/ˈlaɪkə/ LY-kə; Russian: лайка, romanized: layka, IPA: [ˈlajkə], pl. лайки, layki) is a term for several types of dogs that originate from Russia, particularly Siberia, but also sometimes expanded to include Nordic hunting breeds. Laika breeds are primitive dogs who flourish with minimal care even in hostile weather. Generally, laika breeds are expected to be versatile hunting dogs, capable of hunting game of a variety of sizes by treeing small game, pointing and baying larger game and working as teams to corner bear and boar. However a few laikas have specialized as herding or sled dogs.

== Definition ==
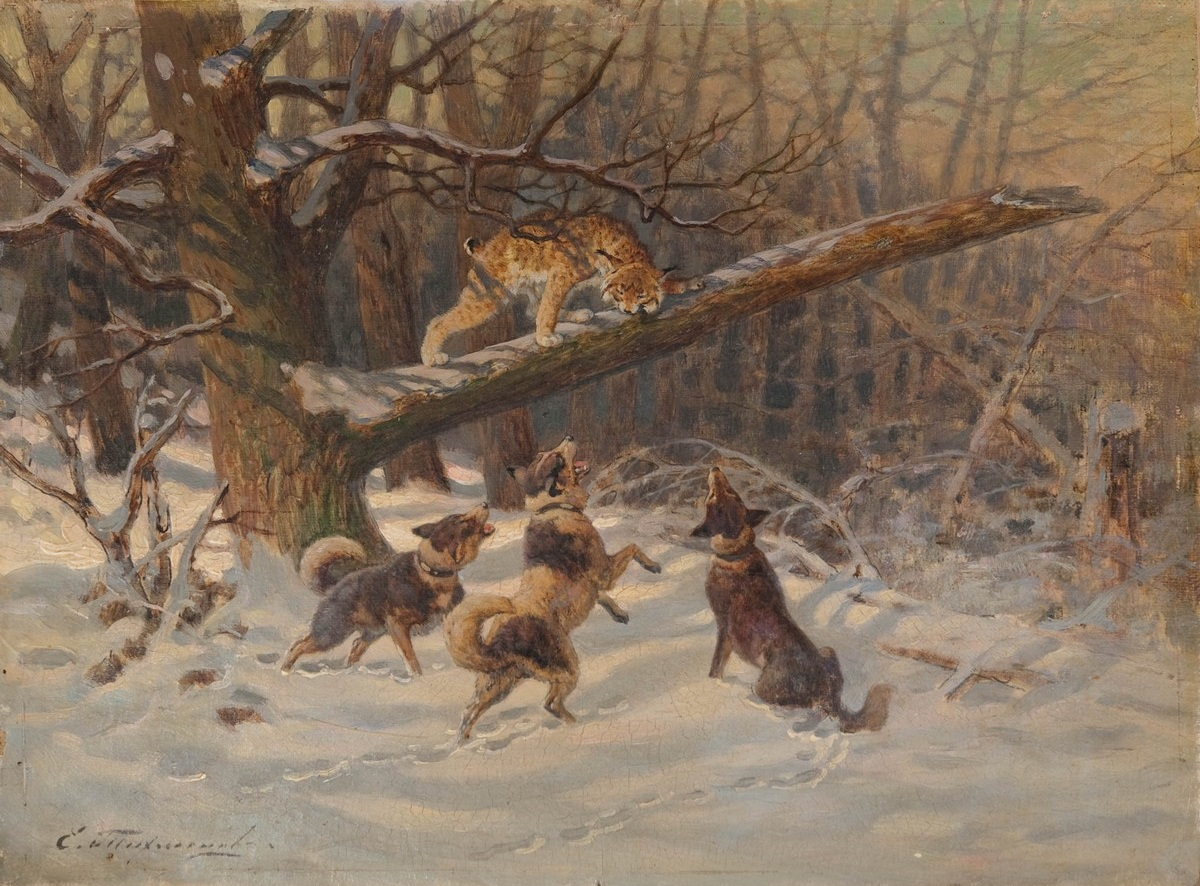
Laikas driving lynx (1800s), Efim A. Tikhmenev

The Russian word laika (лайка) is a noun derived from the verb layat' (лаять, 'to bark'), and literally means barker. As the name of a dog variety, it is used not only in Russian cynological literature, but sometimes in other languages as well to refer to all varieties of hunting dogs traditionally kept by the peoples of the northern Russia and adjacent areas. This includes not only the three or four breeds known as Laikas in English, but also other standard breeds that the FCI classifies together with them as "Nordic Hunting Dogs" (Group 5, Section 2 of the FCI classification).

Indeed the word laika is often used to refer not only to hunting dogs but also to the related sled dog breeds of the tundra belt, which the FCI classifies as "Nordic Sled Dogs" and even occasionally all spitz breeds.

== History ==
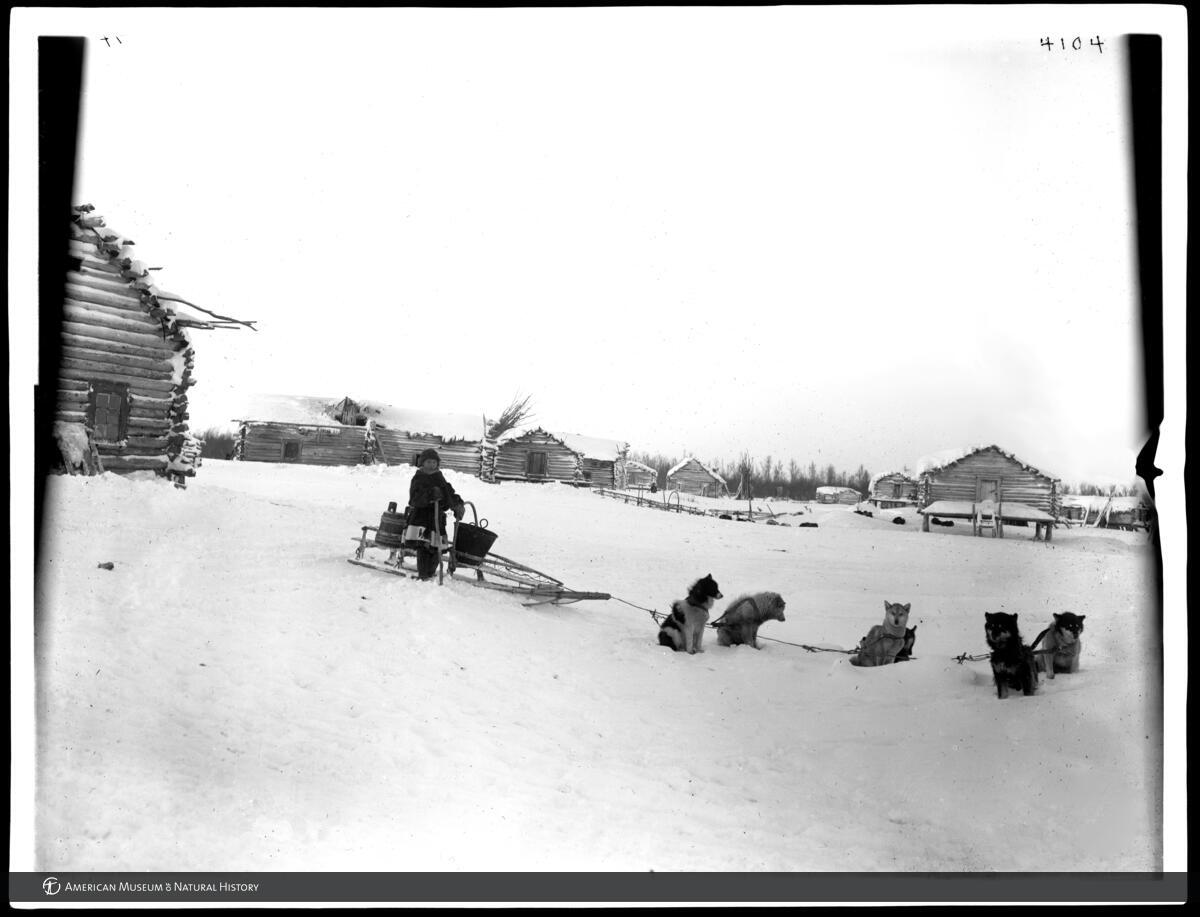
Boy using Yakutian Laika to transport water.

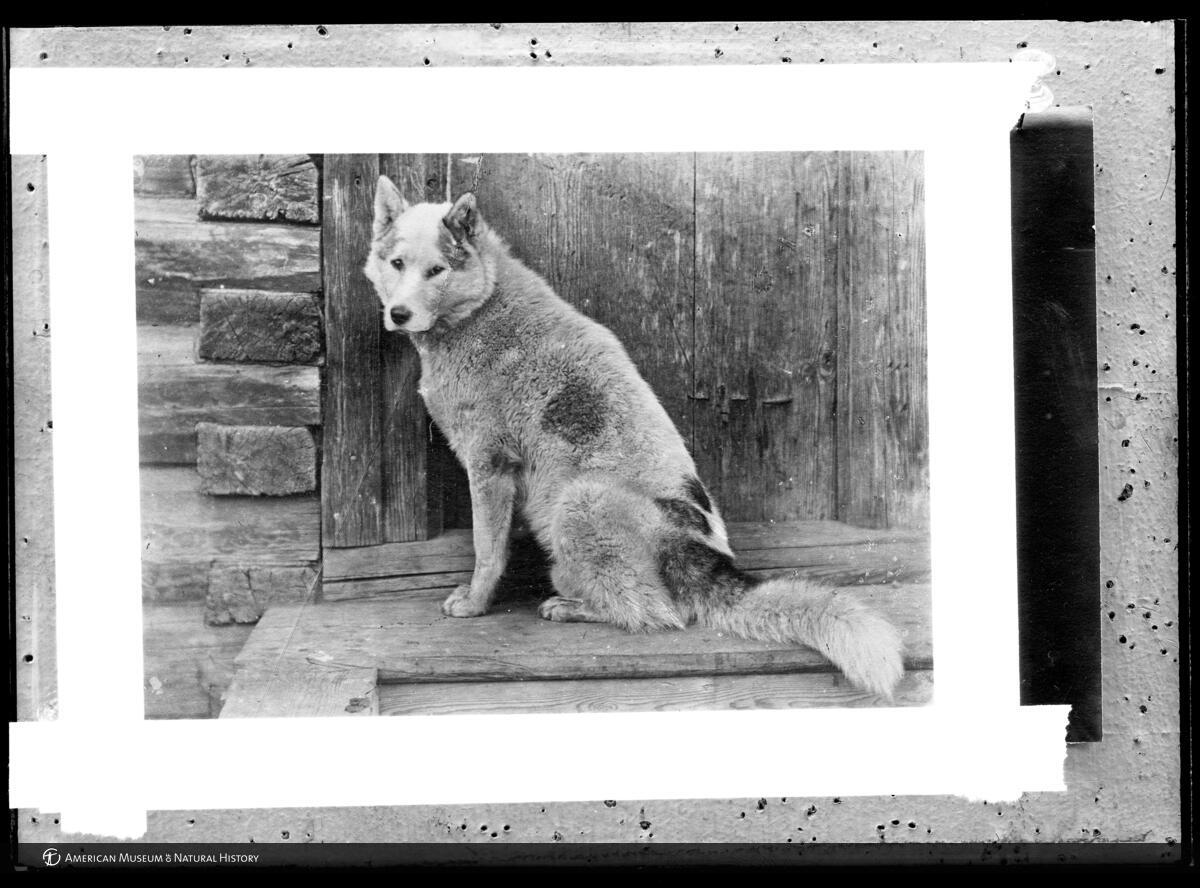
Yukaghir Laika

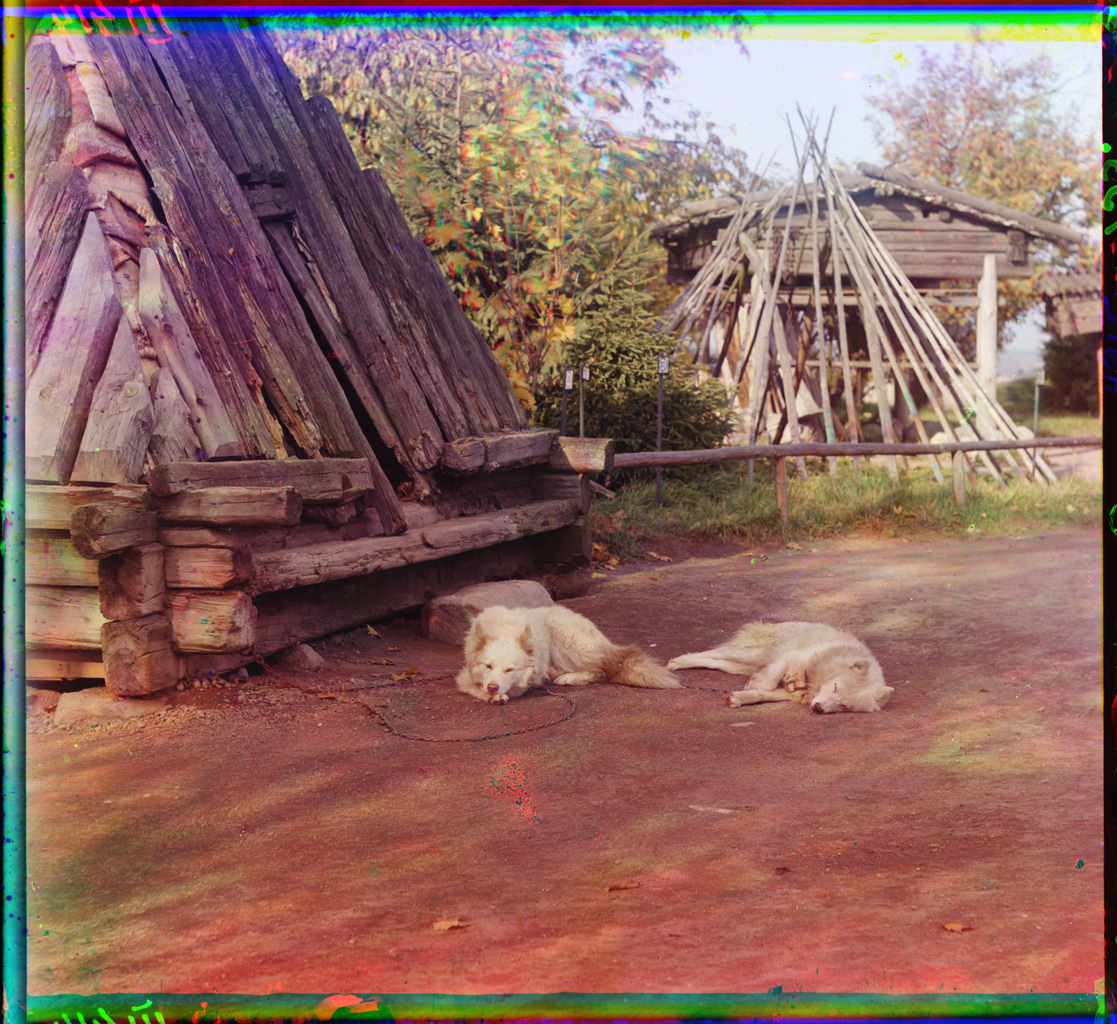
Ural laika photographed in 1909

The debate as to what dogs should be considered laika is as old as Russian cynology. Two of the first known published works on laikas were Prince A. A. Shirinsky-Shikhmatov's groundbreaking illustrated book, "Album of Northern Dogs (Laikas)" and M.G. Dmitrieva-Sulima's book, "The Laika and Hunting With It". An avid bear hunter, Prince Shirinsky-Shikhmatov is described as "Being much interested in the natural sagacity and hunting capacity of the laïkas he procured some hundreds of specimens of different varieties and applied himself seriously to their study and breeding." Prince Shirinsky-Shikhmatov cataloged 13 breeds of laikas: Zyryan, Finno-Karelian, Vogul, Cheremis, Ostyak, Tungus, Votyak, Galician, Norvegian, Buryatian, Soyotian, Laplandian and Samoyed Laika. However, sportswoman and author M. G. Dmitrieva-Sulima considered the term "Northern Dog" to be the most appropriate name to apply to this numerous group of dogs. She also admits that even the term "northern" would also be not quite precise, because dogs of similar type also occurred in Africa, America and everywhere in Asia. Dmitrieva-Sulima would go on to name 19 additional laika breeds, raising the grand total to 30: Kevrolian, Olonets, Kyrghyz, Yakut, Koryak, Orochon, Gilyak, Bashkir, Mongolian, Chukotka, Golds and Yukagir Laikas, Tomsk, Vilyui, Berezovo-Surgut, Kolyma, Pechora Laika, and the Polar Dog.

Regardless of the exact count of laika breeds, all contemporary writers speak of the reverence that local ethnic groups held these dogs. Russian ethnographer Vladimir Jochelson writes "The sled dog is at the same time a hunting dog, with a well-developed sense of smell, but with better hearing and sight. Almost all year round on a leash, but left to themselves, they are perfectly able to find food in the form of mice, partridges, ducks and other birds and small animals."

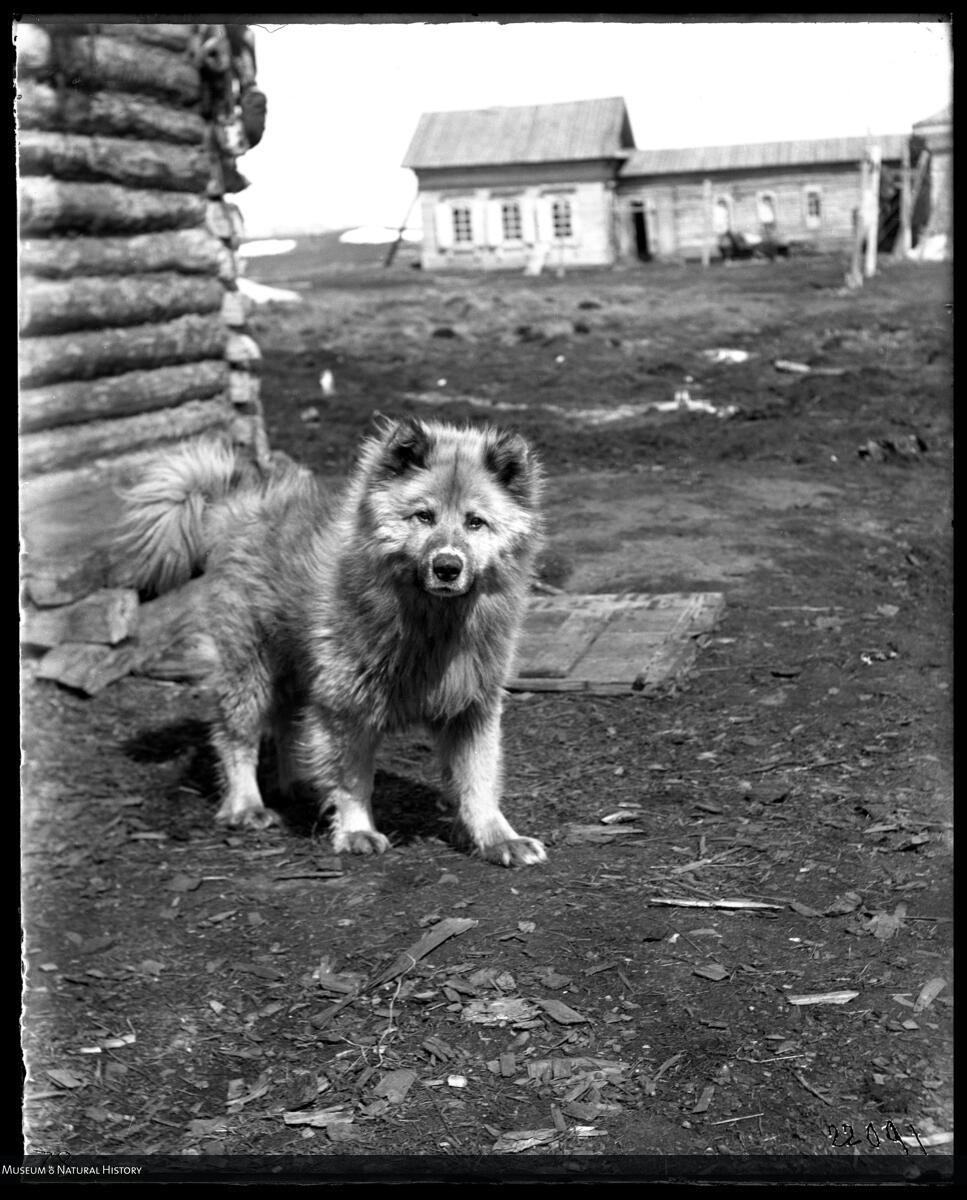
Tungus Laika

During the Soviet era, there was a push to classify dogs by their specialization as well as merge similar local dogs into large geographic zones. Thus, many experts began to consider laikas to be strictly dogs utilized as pointing hunters and excluded herding and sled laikas altogether. However, this proved problematic as the primitive nature of laikas resulted in less specialization than seen in other breeds and the sheer scale of these regions made it difficult to produce a uniform dog within the zones. Nevertheless in 1949, standards of four breeds of hunting Laikas were approved: the Karelo-Finnish Laika, Russo-European Laika, West Siberian Laika and East Siberian Laika. In 1952, the Cynological Soviet of Glavokhota of the Russian Federation approved permanent breed standards of the first three breeds. Meanwhile sled dogs were divided into two types, the smaller western Samoyed and the larger Northeastern Hauling Laika, of which the first was permanently recognized. The popularity of pedigreed dogs combined with a systemic campaign by officials to eliminate aboriginal dogs, resulted in a collapse of unrecognized local aboriginal laika. In addition, the introduction of mechanized travel as well as decline in fur hunting and local fishing further hastened the decline of laikas.

The collapse of the Soviet Union cleared room for additional laikas to be recognized as purebred, and in 1992, the Kamchatka Laika and the Chukotka sled dog gained recognition as purebred by the Russian Cynological Federation, followed by the Nenets Herding Laika in 1994. In 2004, the Yakutian Laika was adopted. Many of the laikas identified at the beginning of the 20th century are now thought to be lost including the Gilyak Laika (Sakhalin husky) and the Yukaghir Laika.

Despite the visual similarity amongst the laika breeds, genetic analysis shows little genetic connection with the similar breeds in the adjacent geographical areas of Russia and Scandinavia.

== Breeds commonly recognized as Laikas ==
Type	Breed	Country of origin	Summary
Hunting Laika	East Siberian Laika	Russia	A sledding, hunting and herding laika from east Siberia.
Hunting Laika	Finnish Spitz	Finland	Known in Russia as the Finnish Laika (Финская лайка) or the Finnish Bird Laika (финская птичья лайка).
Hunting Laika	Karelian Bear Dog	Karelia region of Finland and Russia	Known in Russian as both the Karelian Bear Dog (Карельская Медвежья собака) and the Karelian Bear Laika (карельская медвежья лайка)
Hunting Laika	Karelo-Finnish Laika	Karelia region of Finland and Russia	A small bird laika with a distinct reddish coat. Closely related to the Finnish Spitz.
Hunting Laika	Norbottenspets	Sweden	Known in Russian as Norbotten Spitz (Norbotten Шпиц) but occasionally called Norbotten Laika (Норботтенская лайка)
Hunting Laika	Russo-European Laika	Russia and Finland	A medium size, compact laika, used for hunting a variety of game and as watchdogs.
Hunting Laika	West Siberian Laika	Russia	A rangy and fast laika used for hunting and occasionally sledding.
Hunting Laika	Zerdava	Turkey	A medium size, compact laika, used for hunting a variety of game, especially boar and as watchdogs.
Herding Laika	Nenets Herding Laika	Russia	Also known as the Reindeer Herding Laika or Olenegonka this breed is the ancestor of the Samoyed - bred by Nenets people. Unlike the Samoyed, it has different colour variations, such as white, red, brown, sable, grey, black and piebald.
Herding Laika	Samoyed Samoyed	Russia	A breed of medium-sized herding dogs with thick, white, double-layer coats. Samoyed may be occasionally referred to as the Samoyed Laika (Самоедская лайка)
Sled Laika	Chukotka Sled Dog	Chukotka Autonomous Okrug of Russia	A sled laika prized for its endurance and fuel efficiency, the predecessor to the Siberian Husky
Sled Laika	Kamchatka Sled Dog	Russia	A sled dog from Far East of Siberia.
Sled Laika	Sakhalin Husky	Russia and Japan	A critically endangered sled dog from Sakhalin Island.
Sled Laika	Siberian Husky	Russia	Controversial, diverged from the Chukotka sled dog in the 1930s.
Sled Laika	Yakutian Laika Yakutian Laika	Sakha Republic of Russia	A multi-purpose laika breed, used both in bird and seal hunting, reindeer herding, and sled pulling. However, nowadays it is primarily a sled dog.
