= West Siberian =

West Siberian can refer to:

- West Siberian Plain, the world's largest unbroken lowland
- West Siberian economic region, one of twelve economic regions of Russia
- West Siberian Glacial Lake, a periglacial lake formed approximately 80,000 years ago
- West Siberian Krai, an early krai of Russian SFSR
- West Siberian Laika, a hunting dog breed developed by the indigenous people of Northern Ural and West Siberia
- Altai gas pipeline, a proposed natural gas pipeline to export natural gas from Russia's Western Siberia to North-Western China.
