= East Siberian Laika =

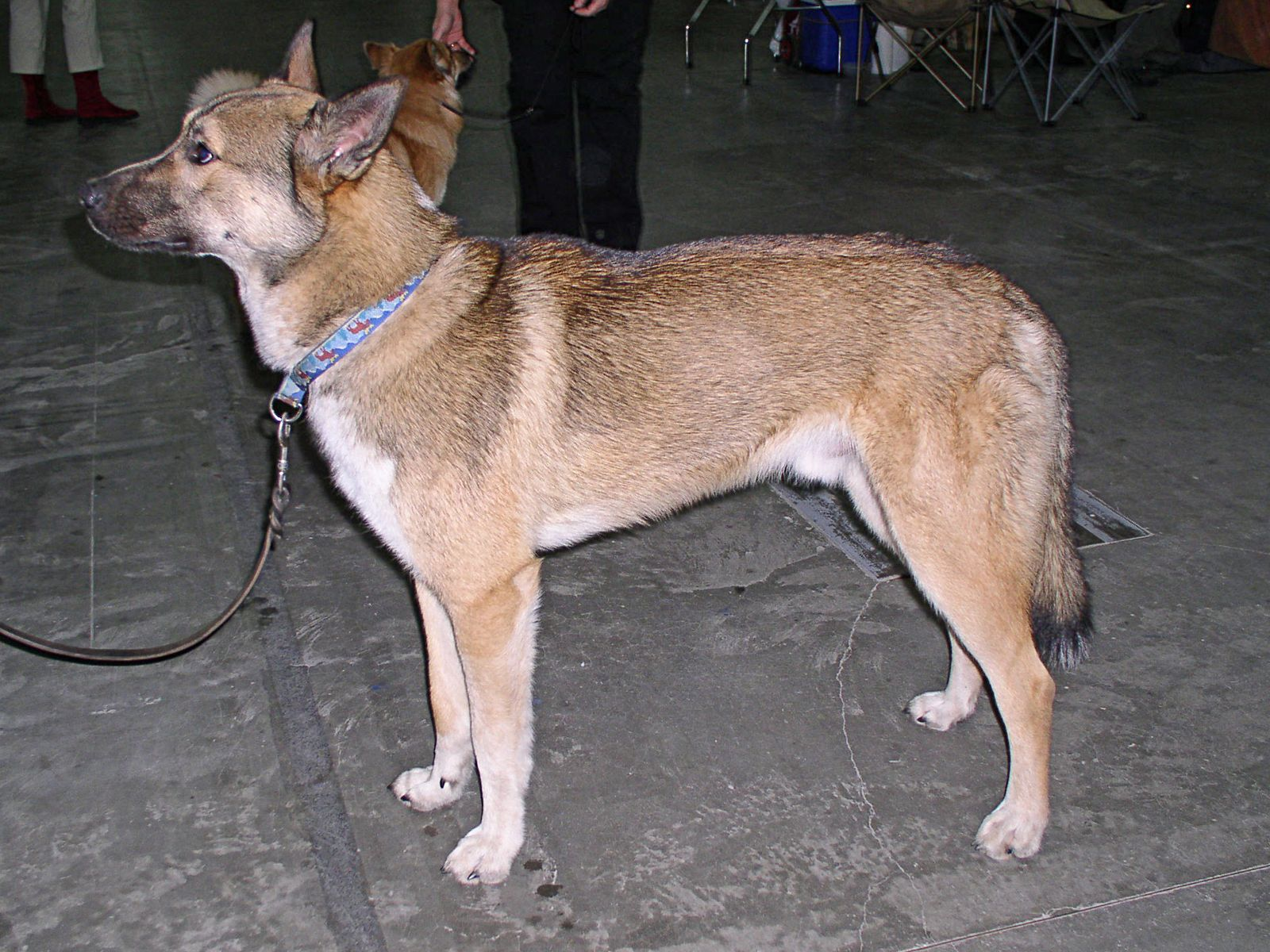
- East Siberian Laika, young dog.
- Origin: Russia
Kennel club standards
- Fédération Cynologique Internationale: standard

The East Siberian Laika (Russian: Восточносибирская лайка, romanized: Vostotchno-Sibirskaia Laika) is a Russian laika of spitz type, a hunting dog originating in parts of Siberia east of the Yenisei River.

== Description ==
=== Appearance ===
Males are 55 to 66 centimetres (22 to 26 in), while females are on the smaller side at 51 to 60 centimetres (20 to 24 in). Black and tan, with light patches (called "karamis"), grizzle, patched, ticked, white, grey, black, red and brown of all shades. There are two major types, the Evenki and the Irkutsk; other less important types are the Yakutia, Amur and Tofolar. These types vary in color and physique, as the East Siberian laika is still more of a diverse conglomerate breed than other recognized Russian laika. Physically the East Siberian Laika is somewhat rangy, nearly square in proportion, slightly higher at the withers than at the croup, robust in bone; head shape varies with the regional varieties. Ears are erect and triangular, the tail carried in a curve over the back. The coat is a medium long double coat with straight coarse guard hair and a soft thick undercoat.

=== Purpose ===
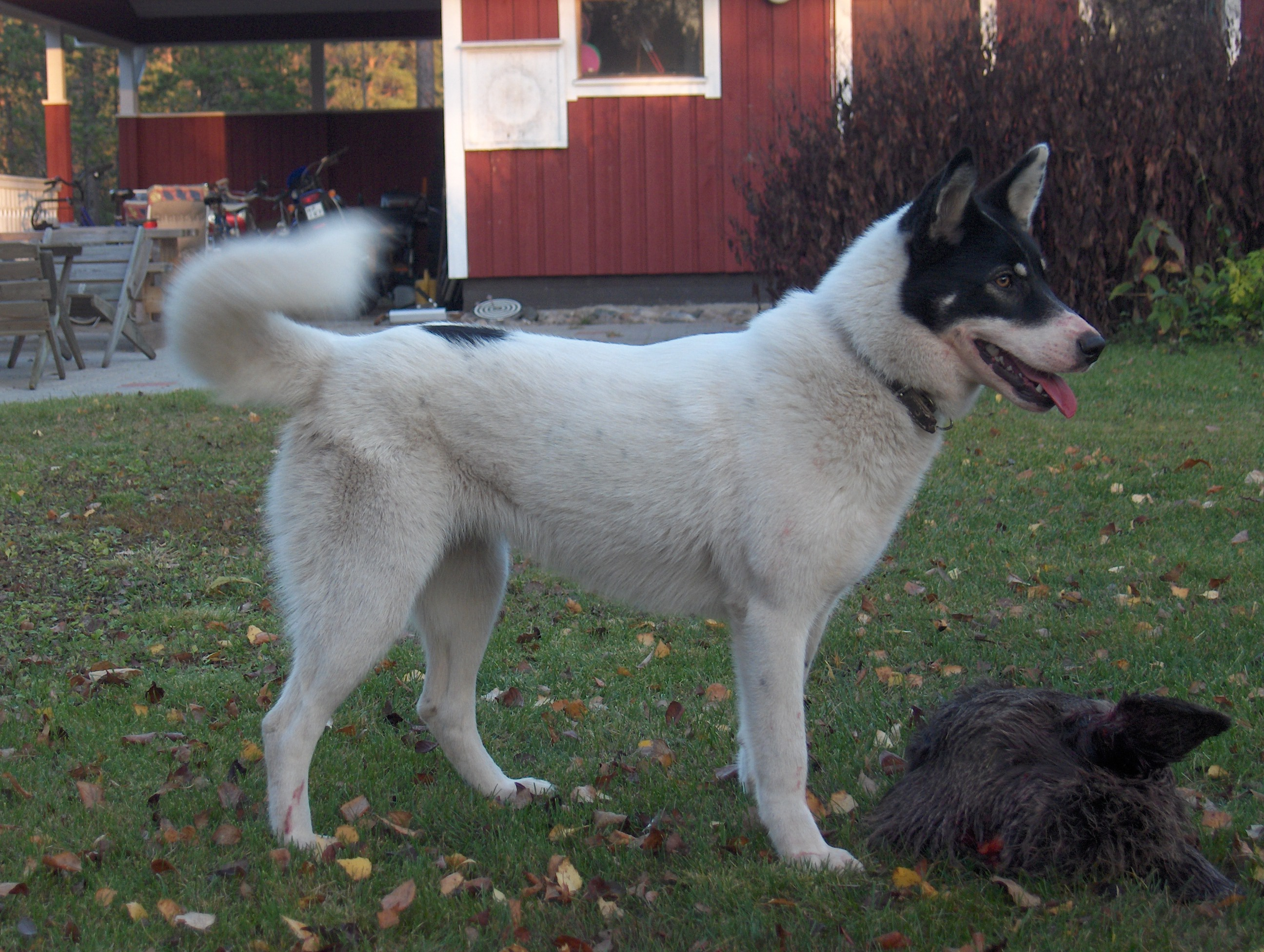
An East Siberian laika

The East Siberian laika is a natural hunting dog used for a wide variety of small and large game, ranging from squirrels, marten, sable, and grouse to moose, bear, wild boar and mountain lions. They can also be used as sled dogs.

=== Temperament ===
East Siberian laika are friendly to humans, have a pronounced hunting passion, as well as a strong, balanced character. For the breed, malevolence towards humans is not typical, nevertheless, in places of primordial breeding they were often used as a guard. Very well adapted for hard work in the harsh conditions of the mountainous Siberian taiga.

== History ==
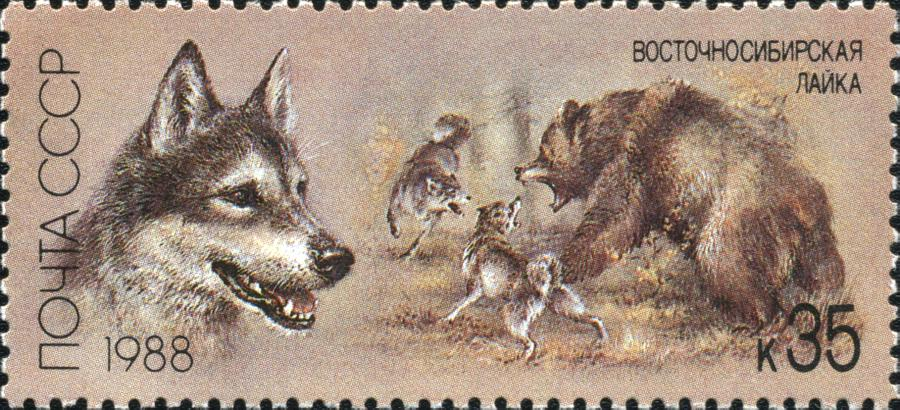
USSR stamp featuring the East Siberian Laika

Prior to the 1940s, there were several aboriginal laika found throughout eastern Siberia used for a variety of purposes including dog sledding, hunting and herding reindeer. During the Soviet era, there was a push to classify dogs by their specialization as well as merge similar local dogs into large geographic zones. Thus, many experts began to focus exclusively on laikas as pointing hunters and exclude herding and sled laika altogether. However, this proved problematic as the primitive nature of laikas resulted in less specialization than seen in other breeds and the shear scale of these regions made it difficult to produce a uniform dog within the zones. The breed designation was established at the All-Union Cynological Congress in 1947, using dogs from the Lake Baikal region, Irkutsk Oblast, Evenki Autonomous Okrug, as well as the Amur River basin and coastal regions. In 1949, standards for the East Siberian laika was approved, however systematic breeding would not begin until the 1970s in government kennels at Irkutsk and in Leningrad. According to a 2011 geneticist study, East Siberian laika and non-barking Basenji dogs from Congo and Sudan belong to the Y-chromosome haplogroup HG9.

== See also ==
- List of dog breeds

== Additional sources ==
- Voilotchnikov, A.T. and Voilotchnikova, S.D. Hunting Laikas. Moscow: Forest Industry Publishing House 1982. (in Russian)
- Voilotchnikov, A. T. and Voilotchnikova, S.D.Laikas and Hunting With Them. Moscow: Forest Industry Publishing House, 1972. (in Russian)
- Maria Georgievna Dmitrieva-Sulima The Laika, and Hunting with Laika (Лайка и охота с ней). (2003, original edition 1911). Aquarium Book, ISBN 978-5-94838-125-1. (in Russian)
