= Karelian Bear Dog =

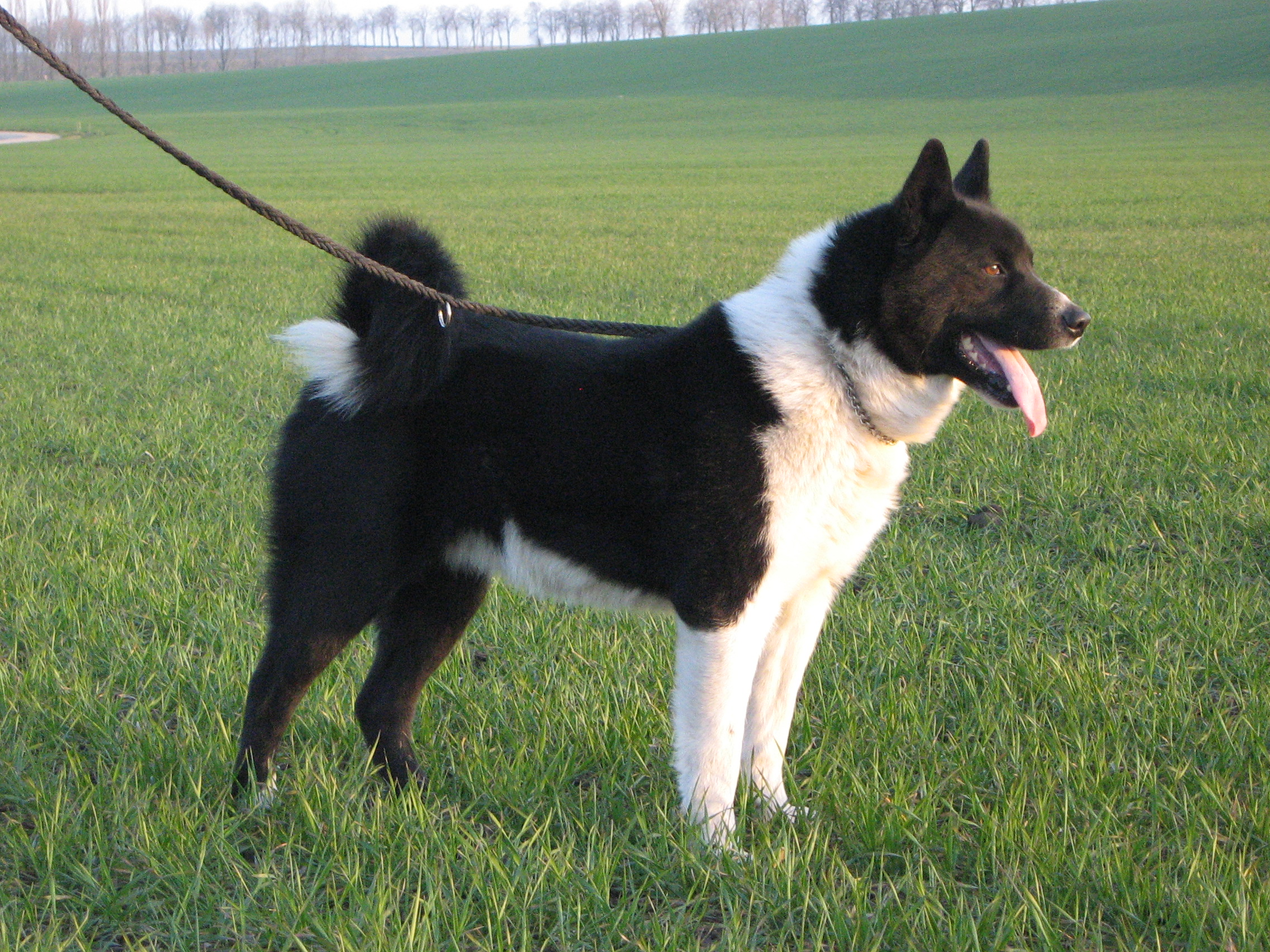
- An adult Karelian Bear Dog
- Other names: Karjalankarhukoira; Karelsk Björnhund
- Origin: Finland
Kennel club standards
- Suomen Kennelliitto: standard
- Fédération Cynologique Internationale: standard

The Karelian Bear Dog (Finnish: Karjalankarhukoira [ˈkɑrjɑlɑnˌkɑrhuˌkoi̯rɑ]) is a Finnish breed of dog. In its home country, it is seen by many as a national treasure. Karelian Bear Dogs will hunt a variety of animals. Its quick reflexes and fearless nature have made it very popular for hunting large game including brown bears, moose, and wild boar. It was the breed's ability to hunt bears that earned the breed its name. The Karelian Bear Dog is among the top 10 most common dog breeds in Finland.

== History ==
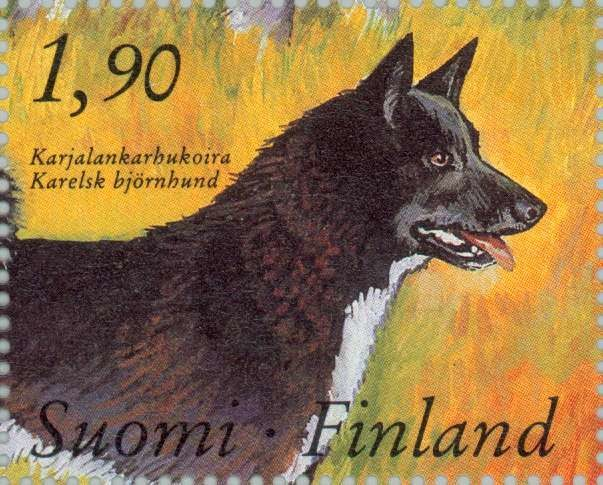
1989 postage stamp depicting the Karelian Bear Dog

The Karelian Bear Dog originated from the Komi dog. Basic stock dogs originated from the Ladoga Karelia, Olonets Karelia, and East Karelia where they were used for hunting. The breeding was started in 1936 to create a sturdy dog which would bark at big game, and named the Karelian Bear Dog. The first standard was established in 1945 and the first dogs were registered in 1946.

The Karelian Bear Dog was used mainly for hunting small fur-bearing animals, such as squirrels and marten. Like the Norwegian Elkhound, the Karelian Bear Dog was also used in hunting moose, lynx, wolf and, as its name would suggest, hunting the Eurasian brown bear. In hunting bear, at least a pair of Bear Dogs would be used to harry the animal, barking loudly, in order to distract the bear while the human hunter came in for the kill.

Karelian Bear Dogs have been used to reduce human-bear conflicts in the U.S., Canada and Japan, through dogs bred by and programs developed and introduced by the Wind River Bear Institute and its Founder Carrie L. Hunt. Larger scale programs have been run by the Institute in coordination with Alberta Parks, Yosemite and Glacier national parks, with Montana Fish, Wildlife and Parks and with the Washington State Department of Fish and Wildlife. Karelian Bear Dogs were introduced in 2004 in Karuizawa, Japan, a popular resort town 170 km northwest of Tokyo, where they reduced the number of black bear incidents from 255 in 2006 to four in 2017.

== Description ==
The breed standard for Karelian Bear Dogs and Laikas today calls for a black-and-white marked dog, but originally the breed included individuals with coats of wolf gray of various shades, red coats like the standard spitz, and black-and-tan specimens as well.

=== Appearance ===
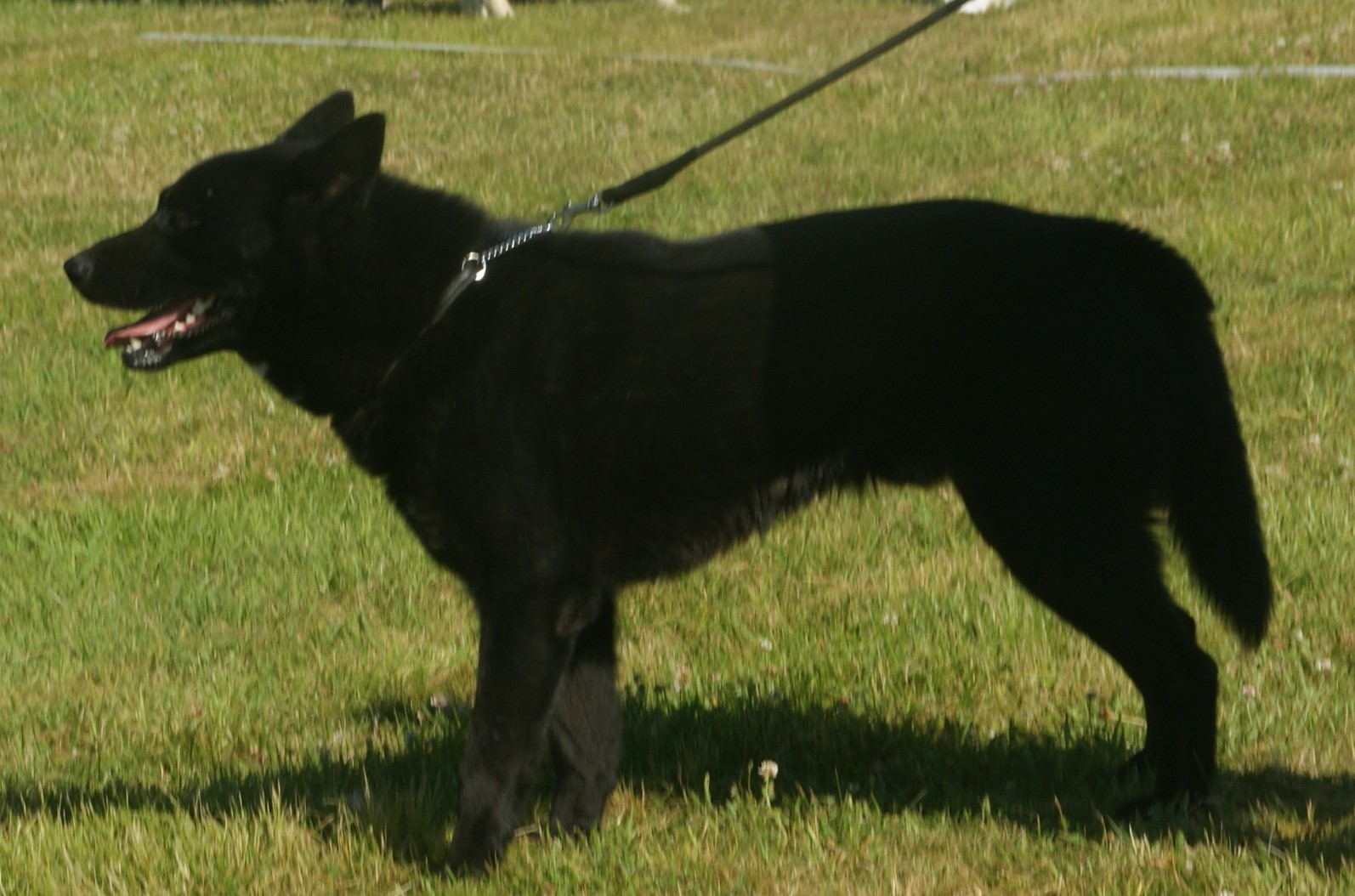
Solid black colour is accepted as well.

Males stand 54–60 cm (21–24 in) at the withers; females are shorter, at 49–55 cm (19–22 in), weighting 17–20 kg (37–44 lb) for females and 25–28 kg (55–62 lb) for males

The breed has a coat of straight, stiff guard hairs and a fine, soft, thick undercoat.

=== Temperament ===
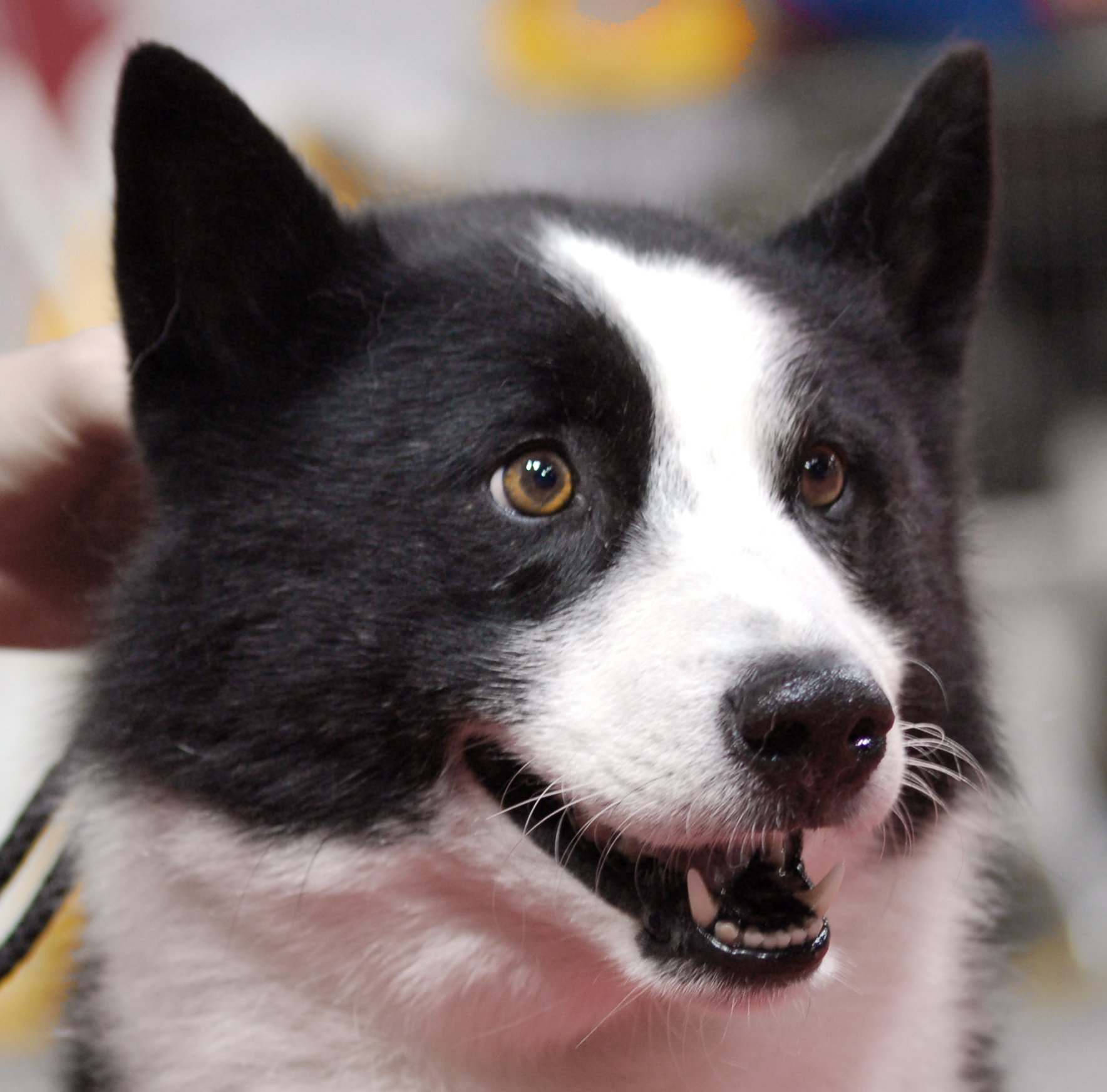
The ideal Karelian Bear Dog has bright eyes.

Karelian Bear Dogs are usually aggressive towards other animals. As all dog breeds, they require socialization or acculturation with anything the owner is around often, especially other house animals, city sounds, etc. They may be territorial towards other male dogs, but are never aggressive towards people, though they may be slightly reserved if not socialized well. They are very affectionate with their owners. Karelian Bear Dogs are territorial and will alert their handler to the presence of any suspicious movement or other animals nearby that they do not know.

They are silent but tenacious hunters and alert their handler only when they have the prey at bay. They will keep prey cornered there by barking in a very high, fast bark and running back and forth or around the animal until their handler comes and dispatches it. Karelian Bear Dogs have been known to hold an animal at bay for a very long time. If a bear tries to leave, the dog will nip at it on the backside and otherwise aggravate it to keep it from running away.

They do not always have to hunt with their master, as they can be trained to work with other people. However, they are prone to separation anxiety due to their very social nature. It is very rare for a Karelian Bear Dog to bite a human, but it may kill another animal if it feels threatened or hungry.

They are very social hunting dogs that prefer an outdoor environment, and need plenty of space to run free and get sufficient exercise. In addition, they need a lot of mental and physical stimulation, as this working breed is used to having a job to do. These traits tend to prevent the breed from becoming popular companion dogs.

== Health ==
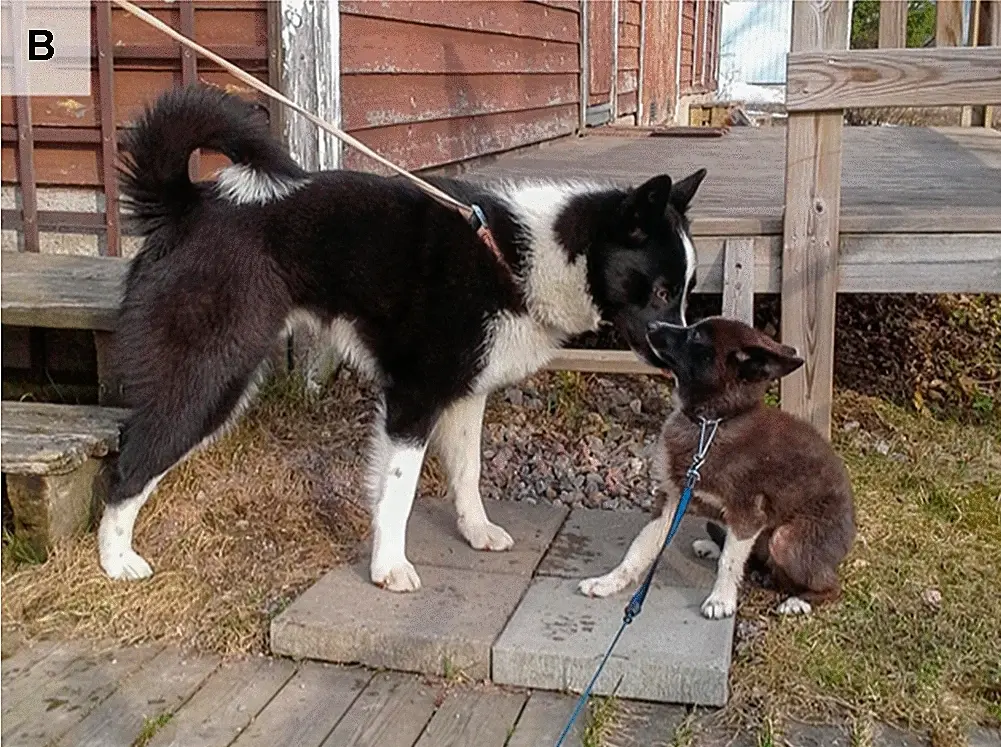
Two littermates at 10 months of age, left is an unaffected littermate and on the right is a bitch affected by pituitary dwarfism

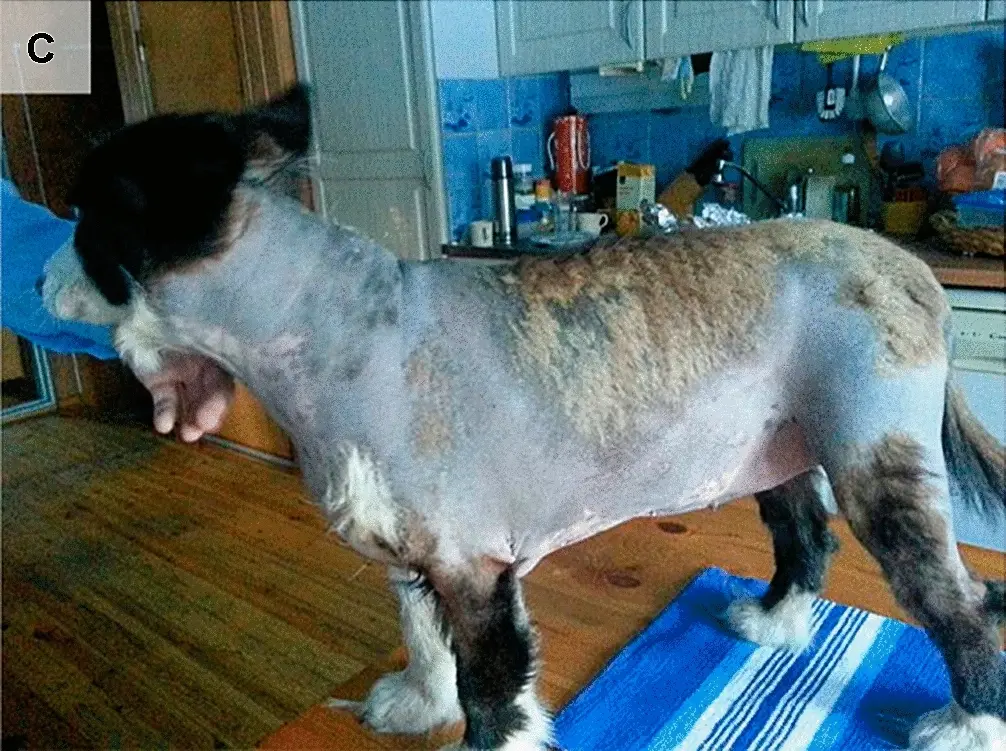
An adult bitch with pituitary dwarfism displaying severe alopecia

A form of inherited chondrodysplasia originally described in the Norwegian Elkhound has been identified in the Karelian Bear Dog. Symptoms include curvature of the forelimbs, carpal valgus, retarded ossification, and a shortening of the vertebral body. Researchers from Finland identified the cause to be a recessive nonsense mutation in the ITGA10 gene. The presence of the condition in the breed is believed to be due to a popular sire actually being a crossbreed with the Norwegian Elkhound.

=== Pituitary dwarfism ===
A mutation for the LHX3 gene causes pituitary dwarfism in the German Shepherd Dog. This mutation is also present in the Karelian Bear Dog due to its German Shepherd ancestry. The condition causes growth retardation and retention of the puppy coat with alopecia later occurring.

== Related breeds ==
- Finnish Spitz
- Norrbottenspets
- Russo-European Laika

== See also ==
- List of dog breeds
- Combai
- German Shepherd
