= Laika (disambiguation) =

Laika was a Soviet space dog who was the first animal to orbit the Earth.

Laika may also refer to:

- Laika (dog breed), a type of Russian hunting dog, and a generic name for several Russian and Scandinavian dog breeds, listed in the article

== Art and entertainment ==
- Lajka (English title: Laika) a 2017 Czech animated science fiction comedy film
- Laika (comic), a 2007 graphic novel about the Soviet space dog

=== Music ===
- Laika (band), a UK indie band
- Laika Dog, a UK band featuring Tony Wright
- Laika & The Cosmonauts, a Finnish instrumental rock band
- "Neighborhood #2 (Laïka)", a song by Arcade Fire from Funeral
- "Laika", a 1988 song by Mecano from Descanso Dominical
- "Laika", a 1993 song by Moxy Früvous from Bargainville
- "Laika", a 2008 song by Asian Kung-Fu Generation from World World World
- "Laika", a 2009 song by Kill Hannah from Wake Up the Sleepers
- "Laika", a 2013 song by Sticky Fingers from Caress Your Soul
- "Laika", a 2013 song by Wil Wagner from Laika
- "Laika", a 2016 song by Boston Manor (band) from Be Nothing

=== Video games ===
- Laika: Aged Through Blood, a 2023 post-apocalyptic Metroidvania video game

== Business and brands ==
- Lada Laika, a former Russian car manufactured by Avtovaz
- Laika (cigarette), a Soviet brand of cigarettes 1957–1990s
- Laika, LLC, an American stop-motion animation studio formerly known as Will Vinton Studios
- Laika-class submarine, a Russian class of nuclear-powered fifth-generation multi-purpose submarines currently under development

== Other uses ==
- Laika (island), in the Shepherd Islands, Vanuatu

== See also ==
- Leica (disambiguation)
