= Leica (river) =

- Location within Romania

Location
- Country: Romania
- Counties: Vrancea County
- Villages: Hângulești, Maluri

Physical characteristics
- Mouth: Siret
  - coordinates: 45.5724°N 27.5053°E
- Length: 23 km (14 mi)
- Basin size: 161 km^{2} (62 sq mi)

Basin features
- Progression: Siret→ Danube→ Black Sea

The Leica is a right tributary of the river Siret in Romania. It discharges into the Siret near Nănești. Its length is 23 km (14 mi) and its basin size is 161 km^{2} (62 sq mi).
