= Lika (name) =

Lika is a feminine given name and a surname. It may refer to:

== Given name ==
- Lika Kavzharadze (1959–2017), Georgian film actress
- Lika Mutal (1939–2016), Dutch sculptor
- Lika Ordzhonikidze (born c. 1990), Georgian beauty pageant contestant
- Lika Roman (born 1985), Ukrainian beauty pageant contestant
- Lika Salmanyan (born 1997), Armenian actress

== Surname ==
- Bujar Lika (born 1992), Albanian footballer
- Gilman Lika (born 1987), Albanian footballer
- Gresild Lika (born 1997), Albanian footballer
- Hasan Lika (born 1960), Albanian football coach and former player
- Ilion Lika (born 1980), Albanian footballer
- Ismail Lika, Kosovar-Albanian mobster active in New York City in the 1980s
- Peter Lika (born 1947), German operatic bass
- Savva Lika (born 1970), Greek retired javelin thrower
