= Lyka =

Lyka may refer to:

- Lyka (company), an Australian pet food company
- 917 Lyka, a minor planet orbiting the Sun
- Antal Lyka (1908-1976), a Hungarian football player and coach
- Lyka (wasp), a wasp genus in the family Encyrtidae

== See also ==
- Laika, space dog
