= Lika sheep =

Breed of sheep

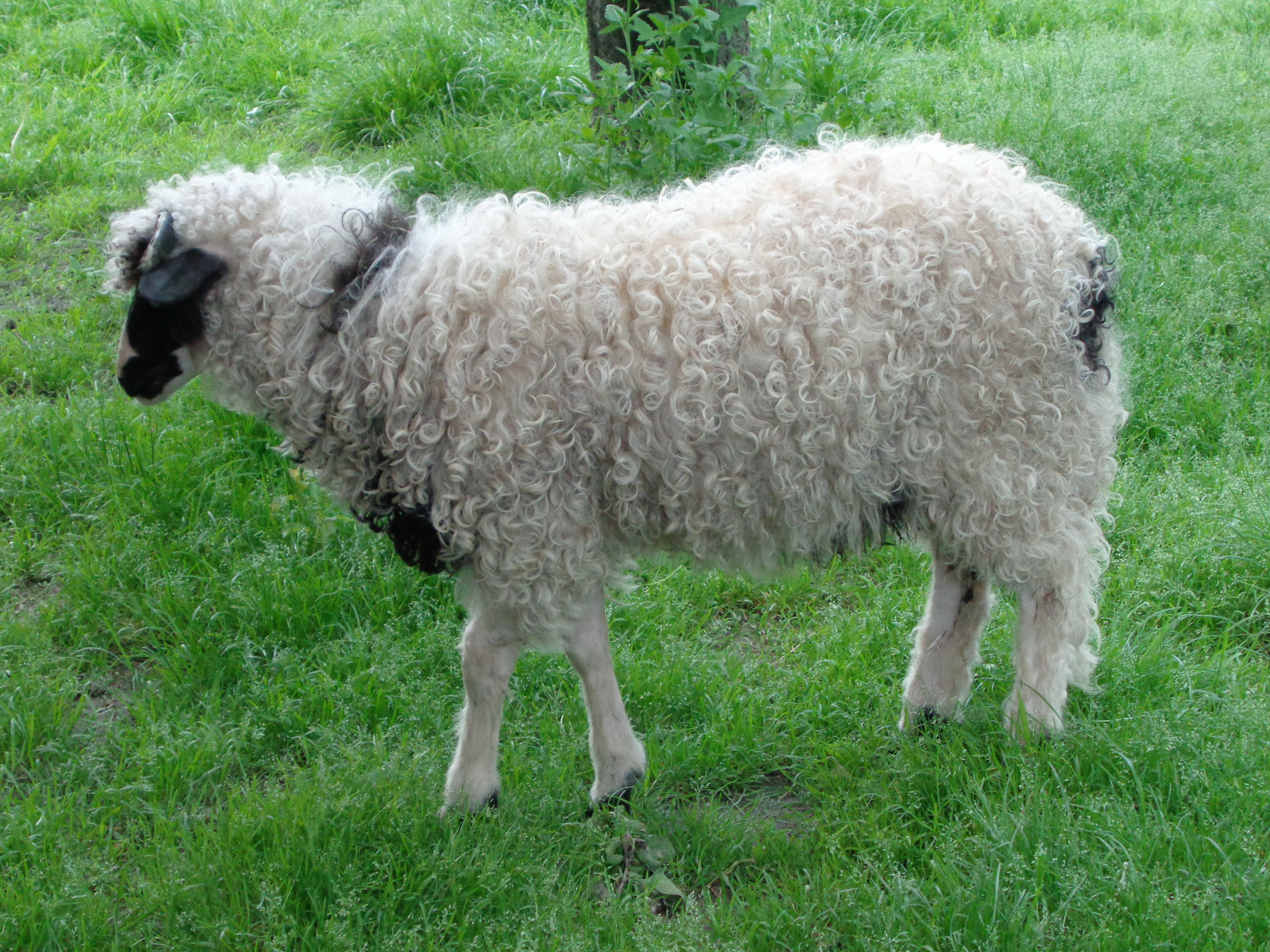
A Lika sheep in a field

The Lika (Croatian: Lička pramenka) is a breed of sheep from the mountainous regions of Lika and Gorski Kotar in Croatia.
