= Angular limb deformity =

- Other names: Crooked legs, Angular limb deviation, Carpal valgus, Carpal varus, Carpal flexural deformity
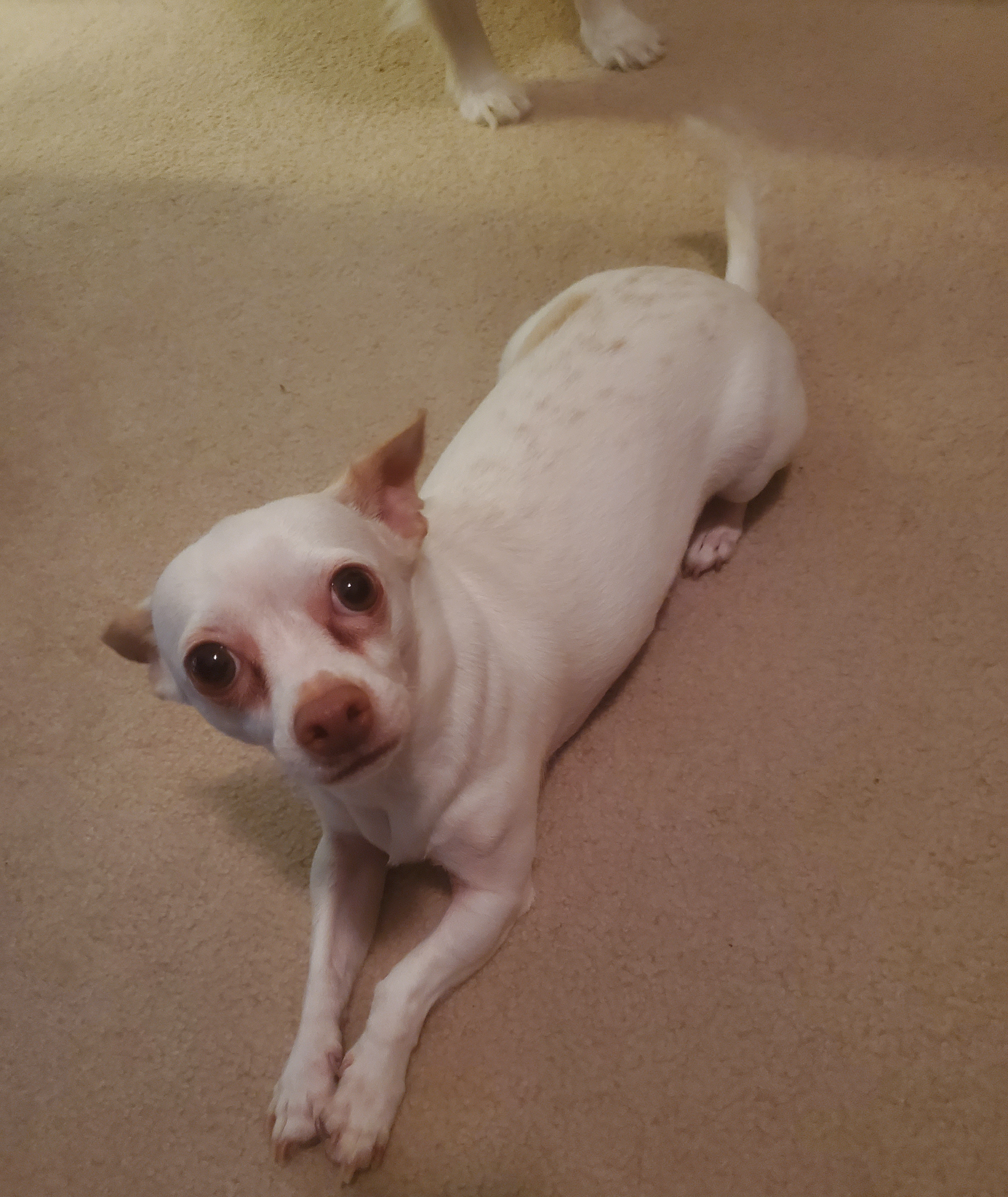
- A chihuahua with a carpal valgus deformity in the front left limb.
- Specialty: Orthopedics
- Causes: Blunt force trauma, unbalanced nutrition, or excessive exercise before the closure of the growth plate
- Treatment: Surgery, weight management

Angular limb deformity (Note: According to Harasen, also called, variously, carpal hyperextension; carpal hyperflexion; carpal flexural deformity; or carpal laxity syndrome.) is a pathological deformity in the spatial alignment of any limb in quadrupedal animals. The term encompasses any condition in such an animal wherein a limb is not straight. It most commonly occurs in the carpal joint of the forelimbs, manifesting as the limb pointing outward (carpal valgus) or inward (carpal varus), deviating from normal development.

== Causes ==
Angular limb deformity usually occurs due to outside factors during developmental years, including blunt force trauma, unbalanced nutrition, or excessive exercise. They are less likely to develop in hind limbs, except in certain animals, such as dachshunds. Rarely, they can also occur from a genetic predisposition to premature growth plate closure. The exact aetiology of the deformity is unknown.

== Symptoms and Diagnosis ==
Significant angular limb deformity is often apparent visually from looking at the limbs in front of, behind, or from the side of the animal. Diagnosis is usually made through physical examination, which can include manipulation of the limbs.

The condition is often painless. However, affected limbs may show lameness or joint swelling, resulting in limps of varying degree to the animal.

Radiographs can be used to assess the location of the deviation, the degree of deviation from normal, the condition of the bones within the affected joint, the appearance of the growth plates, and response to treatment over time.

== Treatment ==
Surgical correction may be used to treat significant angular limb deformity, usually carpal valgus, that is causing discomfort and impaired limb use. For younger patients with significant growth potential to the affected area remaining, a surgery involving cutting the ulna to release its hold on the radius is possible; this allows the radius to straighten and grow to normal length. For fully developed animals, a corrective osteotomy may be used to treat the condition.

The animal's weight should be managed carefully to avoid exacerbating lameness or pain. In addition, activities that incur trauma upon the joint, such as jumping, should be discouraged.

== Aftercare and Prognosis ==
Given that most forms of the condition are painless, prognosis is generally good. Depending on the procedure performed and severity of the deformity, aftercare treatment may require rest, daily monitoring of the limb, and repeat radiographs.

== Affected animals ==
The condition is common in horses, often from perinatal factors such as premature birth or placentitis. Most commonly,the carpus is affected. Less commonly, the condition may manifest in the fetlock or tarsus.

Dog breeds that have short, bowlegged limbs are most susceptible to the condition. Male dogs are more frequently affected than females.
