= West Siberian Laika =

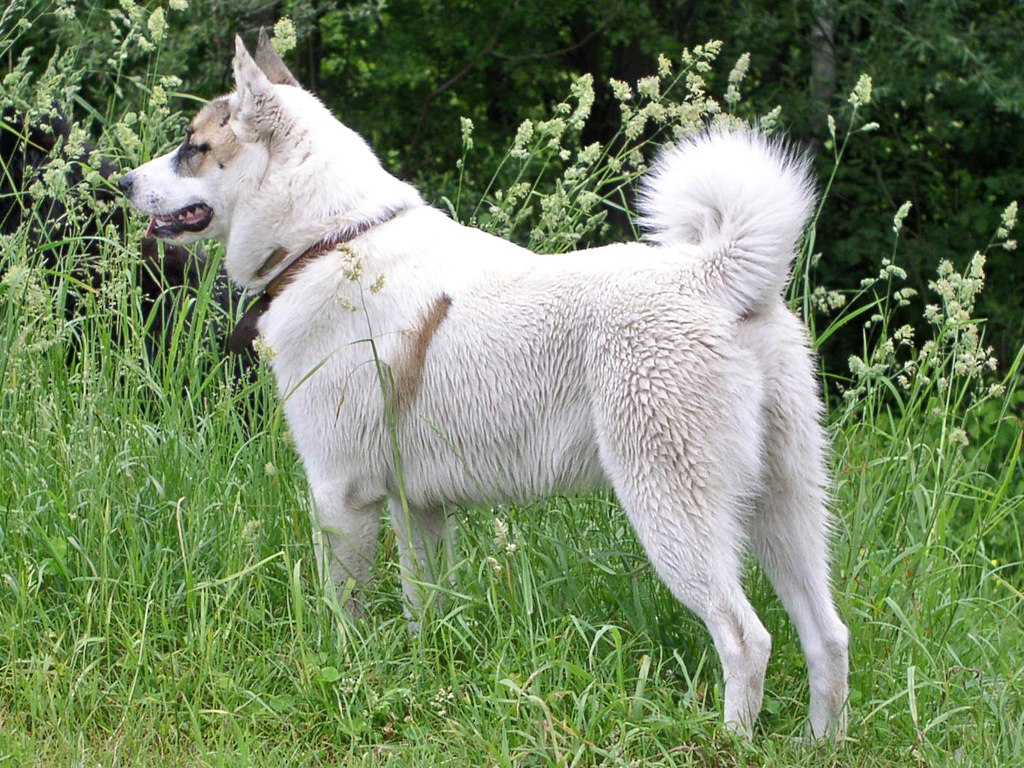
- A male West Siberian Laika
- Other names: Zapadno-Sibirskaïa Laïka
- Origin: Russia
Kennel club standards
- Fédération Cynologique Internationale: standard

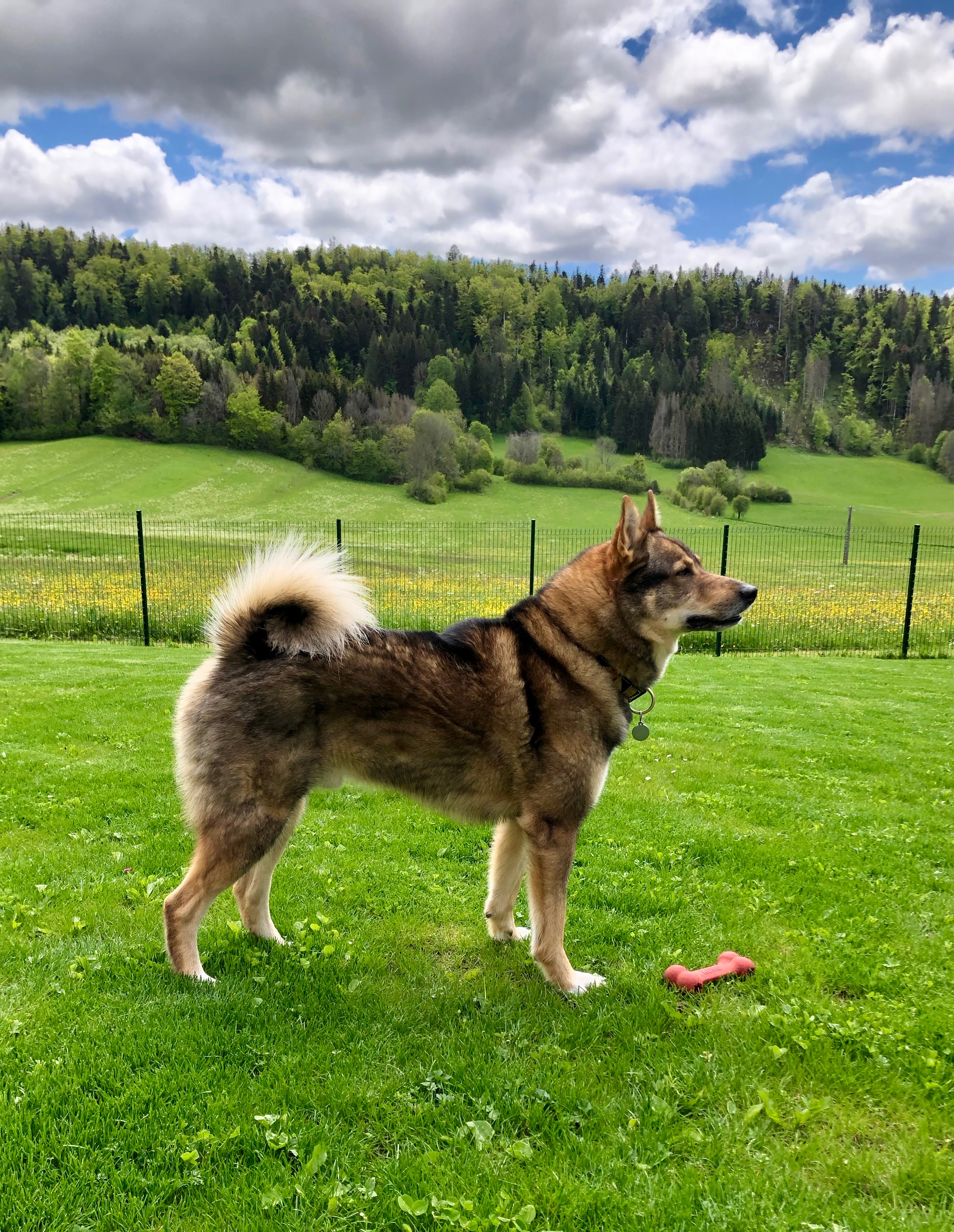

The West Siberian Laika or WSL, is a breed of spitz–type hunting dog. Russian publications indicate that the term West Siberian Laika loosely applied to hunting dogs originating with the Mansi and Khanty people in Ural and West Siberia, but there were no standards or registrations of WSL as such until 1930. Then WWII disrupted it for a while, but systematic breeding with registrations resumed after the war ended, in 1946. This was the time the breed began taking modern shape. Before that hunters only knew of Mansi Laika and Khanty Laika. In early 1960 many hunters in Ural still preferred the term Mansi Laika, when speaking of West Siberian Laika. In Russian language, the term Laika originated from the word layat that means to bark. The word Laika simply means barker. Any hunting Laika is a bark pointer (pointing at animal of interest by barking and staying with the animal ). It is a versatile dog depending on use and environment, but in certain parts of the country they have become more specialized.

== History ==
Laikas resemble those dogs that originally accompanied humans since prehistory worldwide, until they became replaced with lop-eared, specialized for certain style of hunting, cultured breeds. In large sparser populated parts of Russia, this process came at a later time and aboriginal Laika types still remain with hunters in remote northern and northeastern provinces of the country.

Deforestation of land for agriculture and industrialization in later 19th-early 20th Centuries accelerated replacement of Laikas with other popular at the time dogs. Russian experts of the late 19th century distinguished dozens of varieties of aboriginal Laikas, each associated with a particular ethnic group of Indigenous people of northeastern Europe and Siberia, but none of them had been considered as purebred and pedigreed. Russians tried to save some hunting Laikas from extinction by bringing them from different provincial parts of Russia in cities of European part of the country and breeding them pure. Starting from thirtieth and especially after WW II, they established four breeds as purebreds: the Karelo-Finnish Laika, the Russ-European Laika, the West Siberian Laika and the East Siberian Laika. They all are bark-pointing dogs and their hunting behavior is generally similar. All of them are descendants of aboriginal types of Laikas selectively sampled from large territories and lumped into the four breeds for breeding in kennels. Among all of them, the West Siberian Laika became most popular and by present time it is most numerous Laika far beyond its original range in Russia.

== Appearance ==
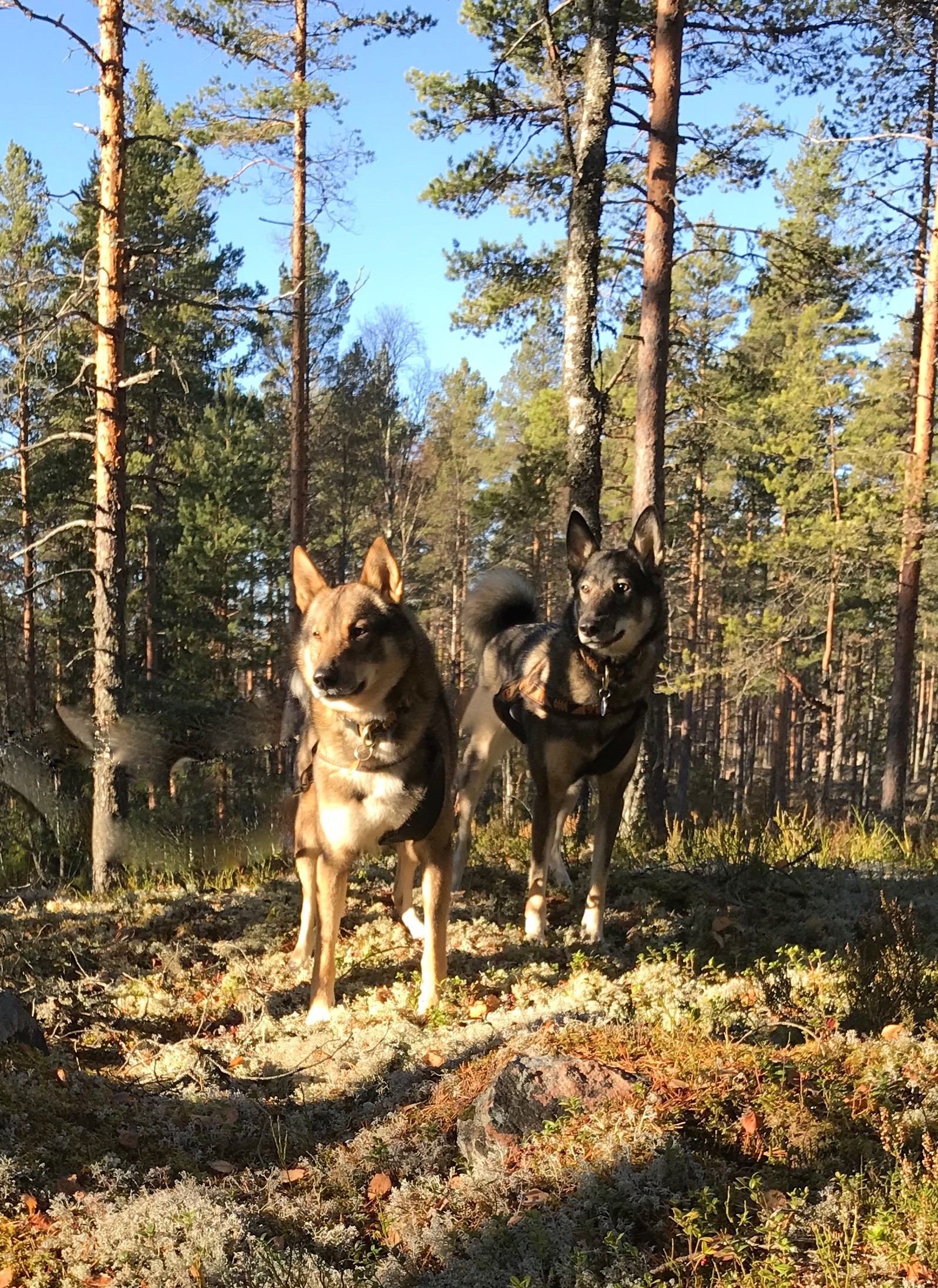

Laikas belong to northern primitive breeds retaining traits of their wild ancestor, the wolf, in the appearance and behavior. They are dogs with pointed muzzles, slightly rangy or nearly square body and often gray or gray mixed with red like in the wolf coat color predominate. They are small to medium size pariah- type dogs.

The West Siberian Laika is a medium to large size dog. Males are 22–24 in (56–61 cm) and females are 20–23 in (51–58 cm) at the shoulder.

- The coat of the West Siberian Laika is a double coat of harsh straight guard hairs and thick and soft undercoat. The guard hairs on the neck, around the head and shoulders are particularly long and stiff. Together with a very thick undercoat they form a ruff framing the dog's face. On the tail, the guard hair and undercoat are also longer and thicker than on the rest of the body. In wintertime, dogs living in cold climate grow hair between the toes. Although the coat quality varies individually, dogs raised in countries with cold climates have longer and thicker coats than dogs that live in warm and hot climates or dogs that are kept inside most of the time.
- Most common coat colors are wolf gray, pale red and white. The gray coat can be of various shades from almost white to very dark gray, nearly black. The gray can be mixed with red producing array of brownish and red shades. Dogs with either coat color described above may have white patches in different proportions. Pale red and white dogs may have brown noses and lips. Dogs with either coat color have so-called "zonary" pattern of distribution of pigment in each guard hair. This means guard hair has alternating bands (zones) of white with black, brown or red color. Hairs with evenly distributed pigment indicate an admixture of other than Laika breed.
- The head is wedge-shaped in the form of a triangle, flat on the top and broader between ears. In the Mansi Laika, the head is more elongate with muzzle as long as the skull from eye to occiput or slightly longer. In the Khanty Laika, the head is broader and the muzzle is as long as the skull or slightly shorter. Lips are always close and lean. A full set of large teeth with a scissors bite is typical, but dogs with vice bite also occur. The standard accepts scissors bite only. In many dogs with a scissors bite at young age the bite is changing with age and becomes a vice bite by age of 5–6 years.
- Eyes are almond-shaped, medium size, deep set and distinctly slanted. Their colors are brown to dark brown. Dogs with amber yellow and/or blue eyes rarely occur, but hunters believe that dogs with brown and dark brown eyes are better hunting dogs. According to the standard, any eye color, except brown and light brown is a fault.
- Ears are always pricked and directed straight up, but their size, pointed or slightly rounded tips of ears are variable. Generally, ears of the Khanty Laika are small to medium. In the Mansi Laika, ears are medium to long. Ears can be set high and close to each other or slightly apart.
- The tail is carried high curving over the back. Details of its structure and carriage are variable among aboriginal dogs. In majority of dogs, the tip of the tail lies on the back, but some dogs have the tip of the tail rigidly curved like a fishhook. Among aboriginal dogs, there are individuals with a sickle-shaped tail, but it is considered faulty by the modern breed standard.
- The body is slightly longer than the height or nearly square and with well-muscled forequarters and hindquarters. Legs are straight and parallel. Front feet are directed forward or slightly east–west and hind legs are straight and in many dogs slightly cow-hocked. The breed standard rejects square body proportions, cow hocks and east–west position of front feet. The angulation at stifles is normally developed and look like in wild canids. Feet are strong, compact and elongate. Toes are strong, flexible and well arched.

== Reproduction ==
The majority of females of the West Siberian Laika have one estrus per year, usually in February and March. Some females have their first estrus not fixed by a certain season. The first estrus can be at age of one to two and a half years. Russian experts do not recommend breeding Laikas until they are at least two years old. The number of puppies per litter varies from one to nine, but litters of three to seven puppies are most frequent. Females of the West Siberian Laika are good mothers and, if conditions permit, dig their own whelping dens, give birth to puppies and raise them without any assistance as soon as the food is available.

== Character and behavior ==
The West Siberian Laika is very affectionate and devoted to its owner. The majority of them bark at strangers approaching the house. Their attitude to unfamiliar people varies individually and depending on the situation. Some dogs first bark at the guest before allowing themselves to be petted, while most other West Siberian Laikas are aloof with strangers, and refuse to be petted.

This breed is protective of their owner, family and their property. Many West Siberian Laikas accept a new owner with difficulty and need time to adjust to a new environment. The West Siberian Laika is highly territorial and may be aggressive to other intruding dogs of the same sex. Adult Laikas, especially males, should only hunt with dogs raised in the same household. West Siberian Laika has good friend or foe judgement and are naturally capable of telling apart wild game from domesticated animals, with ability easily learn to distinguish farm animals and leaving them alone. Cats of the same household are accepted, but stray cats will be treated like game.

== Utilitarian qualities ==
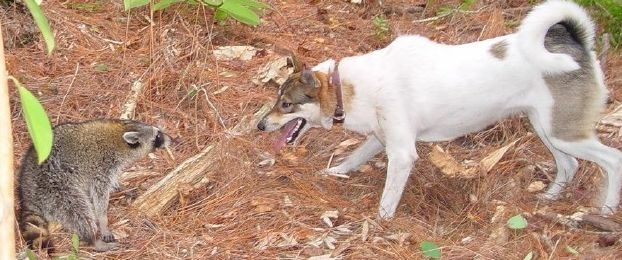
Laika hunting raccoon.

The West Siberian Laika is primarily a hunting dog. It's traits are comparable to a typical hunting Spitz. It is exceptionally intelligent and emotional dog, observant to the habits of its master and mood, often can foresee intentions. It does not hesitate to express its strong feelings by barking and other noises. The West Siberian Laika is a poor kennel dog. If the dog is left alone, locked up in a small backyard or in a pen, some dogs develop a habit of barking, seemingly without a purpose. Permanently penned or fenced West Siberian Laikas attempt to dig under the fence or climb over it. Some dogs not trained to stay penned, try to bite the wires and thereby can damage their teeth. Once freed or turned loose, such dog may be hard to control for some time due to mental damage. It will run too far, chase other animals and likely get into trouble. West Siberian Laikas that are kept well exercised, busy with hunting and contacts with other dogs, animals and people, are content, obedient and never bark without a reason. Therefore, to make a happy dog and its owner, the right conditions of the environment for hunting plus time dedicated to the dog must be met.

All West Siberian Laikas are naturally protective against wild animals, especially predators, and some dogs are protective against strangers acting suspicious or violent. However, its interest in wildlife demands special attention because the dog may tree some animals and stay far behind for some time. It needs regular exercising between hunting seasons by going on a walking trips in order to stay healthy and fit.

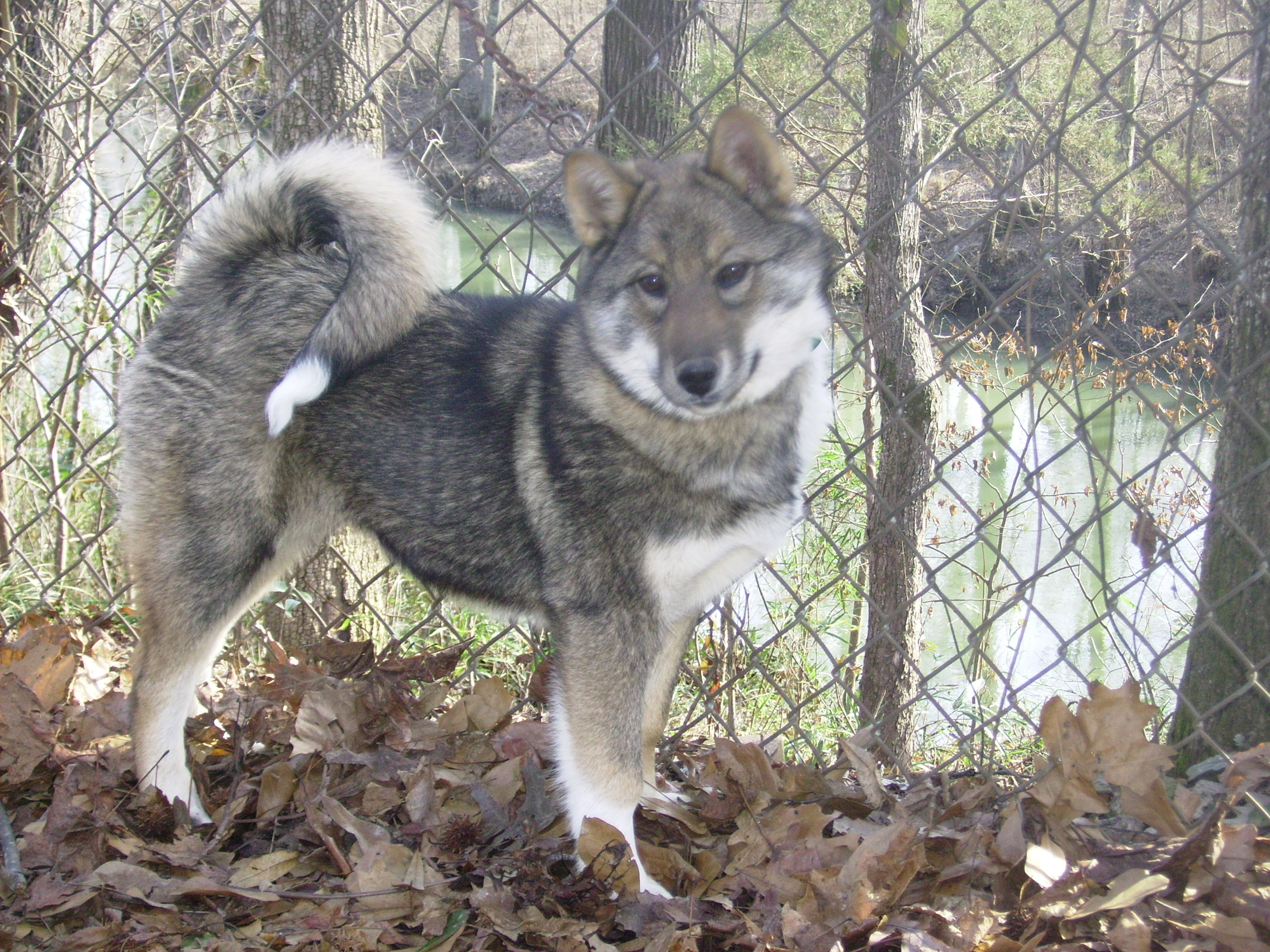
A 4 month old WSL female pup, it is at this stage that their unique natural hunting instincts become evident.

Breeds of these dogs have been widely used to reduce human-bear conflicts in the U.S., Canada and Japan. They were introduced in 2004 in Karuizawa, Japan, a popular resort town 170 km northwest of Tokyo, where they reduced the number of bear incidents from 255 in 2006 to four in 2017. So, if you have bears in the woods near you, this dog would be the best to warn you or your loved ones in time about the bear's presence and may even show you a treed bear. If a Laika sees a bear, they will run towards it due to fearless nature, not from it, and will continuously bark. When a Laika barks at a bear, their voice sounds in a threatening manner as if they were barking at a human—very distinctive in comparison when they are barking at a squirrel which tends to be more in routine, repetitive tone. Treeing squirrels and other small game comes naturally. They are extraordinary sensitive sound listeners and will start finding squirrels by age of 4 to 10 months. Mansi, Khanty, Russians and any other ethnic groups of people living in Russia use the same dogs for hunting and as alarm dogs.

Some West Siberian Laikas work well herding reindeer herds. During any activity or training, hunting overrules everything else. A Mansi never minds if his Laika abandons his reindeer herd for a while, especially if his Laika finds valuable game. Mansi and Khanty use reindeer and, in some cases, horses as a draft animal, but good hunting dogs are never used to pull sleds. It would be like using a valuable dagger to chop firewood. If a sled dog is needed, they use another kind sturdy built and larger dog called in Russian "Yezdovaya Laika" or sled Laika. This is practiced mainly in polar tundra where reindeer have nothing to eat.

== See also ==
- List of dog breeds
