= Hunting dog =

Functional type of dog

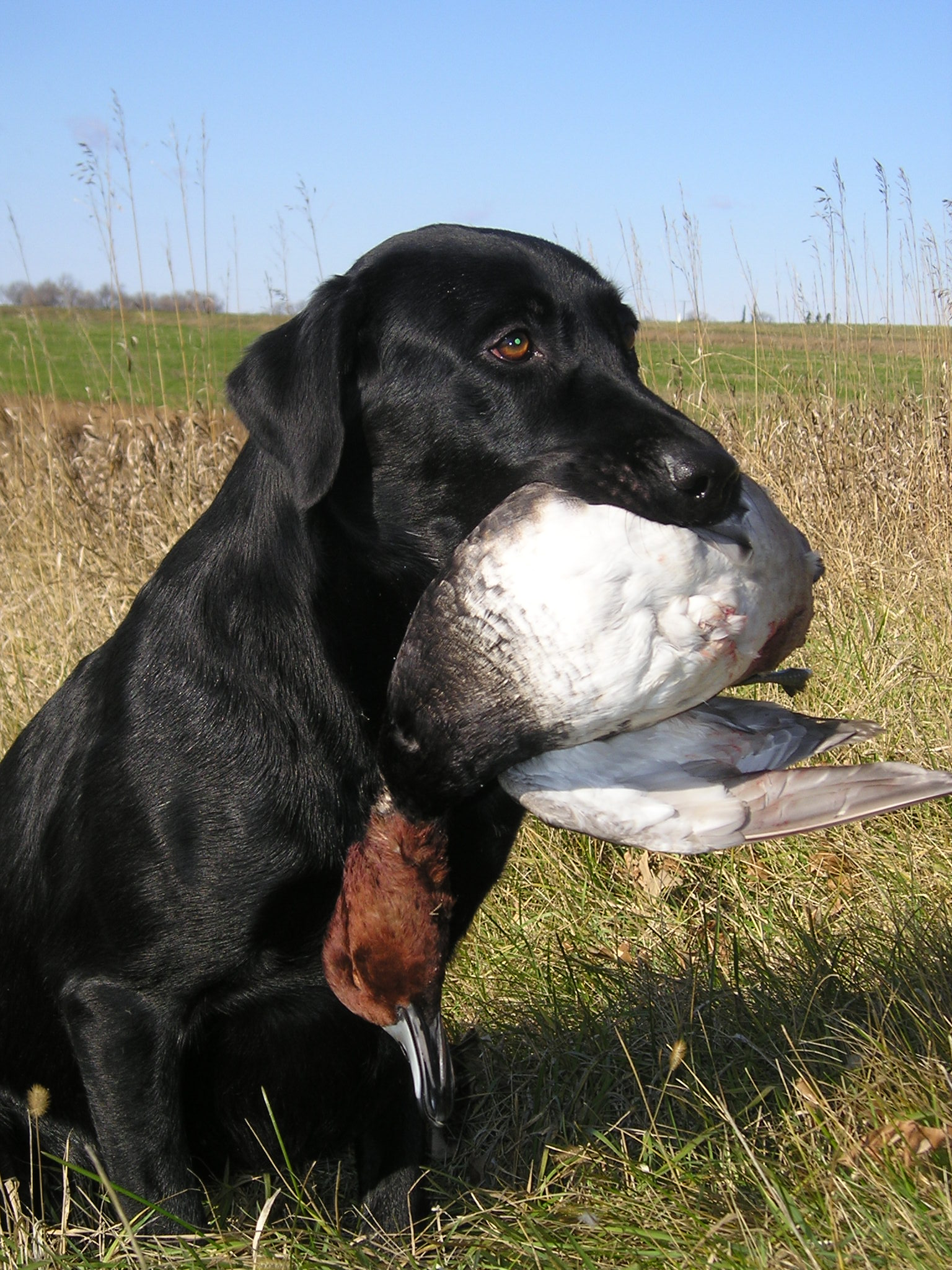
A Labrador Retriever holding a Redhead bird

A hunting dog is a dog that hunts with or for hunters. There are several different types of hunting dog developed for various tasks and purposes. The major categories of hunting dog include hounds, terriers, cur type dogs, and gun dogs. Further distinctions within these categories can be made, based upon the dog's skills and capabilities. They are usually larger and have a more sensitive smell than normal dogs.

== Breeds and capabilities used in hunting ==
For a list of breeds of each type, see the detailed articles for each category:

| Main category | Subcategory | Example | Summary |
|---|---|---|---|
| Hounds | Hounds are further divided into sighthounds and scenthounds depending upon the primary sense used to locate quarry. Many mammals such as jackrabbits, raccoons, coyotes, deer, and other large predators are hunted with hounds. | | |
| Hounds | Sighthounds | Whippet | Sighthounds are tall and lean running hounds, adapted for visual acuity and speed. Their method of hunting is called coursing, where prey is sighted from a distance, chased, and caught. |
| Hounds | Scenthounds | Redbone Coonhound | Scenthounds are hounds that primarily hunt by scent. Scenthounds are used to trail and sometimes kill game. They hunt in packs, leading the hunters on a chase that may end in the quarry being chased into a tree or killed. Some of these breeds have deep, booming barks and use them when following a scent trail. |
| Hounds | Dachshund | Dachshund | The standard dachshund was bred to scent, chase, and flush out badgers, foxes, and other burrow-dwelling animals, while the miniature dachshund was developed to hunt smaller prey such as rabbits. In the American West, they have also been used to hunt prairie dogs. In Europe, dachshunds are widely used for hunting deer, boar, and smaller game such as rabbits and hares. They are also excellent scent dogs and are often used to track down wounded animals after car accidents, for example. The dachshund is also the only breed of dog to hunt both above and below ground. |
| Gun dogs | Gun dogs are used primarily by small game hunters using shotguns. Gun dogs are classified as retrievers, spaniels, and pointing breeds. | | |
| Gun dogs | Pointers | German Shorthaired Pointer | Pointers are dogs trained to locate and point at small game, allowing the hunter to approach and flush the game. Pointing breeds have greater range than spaniels. |
| Gun dogs | Retrievers | Chesapeake Bay Retriever | Once classified as a water spaniel, a retriever's primary role is to find and return shot game to the hunter. Retrievers can spend long hours in a duck blind and visually spot and remember the location of downed birds. Upon command, they retrieve the birds. They may be able to follow hand, verbal, and whistle commands to the downed bird. They typically have large, gentle muzzles. |
| Gun dogs | Setters | English Setter | Setters have a long history as upland gun dogs. They appear to have an innate ability to locate and point at upland game birds. They flush the birds at the hunter's command. |
| Gun dogs | Spaniels | English Cocker Spaniel | Spaniels have been used as hunting dogs. Flushing spaniels are used to locate and flush game for a hunter. |
| Gun dogs | Water dogs | Poodle | Water dogs are a subclass of retrievers. Typically, they are strong swimmers with great stamina, bred to hunt all manner of waterfowl. |
| Curs | | Catahoula Leopard Dog | Curs hunt similarly to terriers, though usually larger game. Curs are used to hunt raccoons, as well as feral pigs, cougars and other large mammals. |
| Feists | | Feist | Feists are small dogs that hunt small game, especially squirrels, in a similar manner to large hounds hunting raccoons and large game. Feists may hunt in packs and "bark up" trees to alert the hunter. |
| Laikas | | Karelian Bear Dog | Laikas are hunting dogs from northern Russia, with origins in Siberia. Laika breeds are primitive dogs that flourish with minimal care even in hostile weather and hunt in a variety of styles depending on the size of the game: they tree small game, point and bay larger game, and work in teams to corner bear and boar. Several other Spitz-type dogs, such as the Norwegian Elkhound, Shiba Inu, and Taiwan Dog are also used for hunting. |
| Lurchers | | Lurcher | A Lurcher is a sighthound crossed with a working dog breed—usually a pastoral dog or terrier bred selected for working. |
| Terriers | | Lakeland Terrier | Terriers are used to hunt small mammals, such as rats. Terriers locate the den or set of the target animal and then bolt, capture, or kill the animal. A working terrier may go underground to kill or drive out game. Hunters who use terriers are referred to as terriermen. Larger members of this type, such those of the bull and terrier family, are sometimes used to hunt larger game, like razorbacks: the hunter will send in scenthounds to corner the pig, and the more heavily built catch dog will charge at it, bite it, and hold it down until the hunter can come and kill it. |

== Gallery ==
Wolf hunt depicted in a 12th-century bestiary

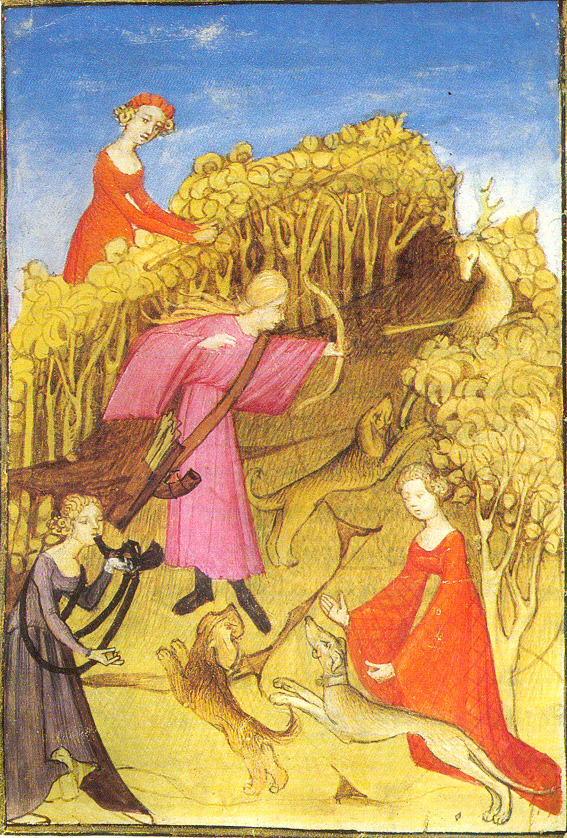
Medieval women hunting, illustration from a period manuscript

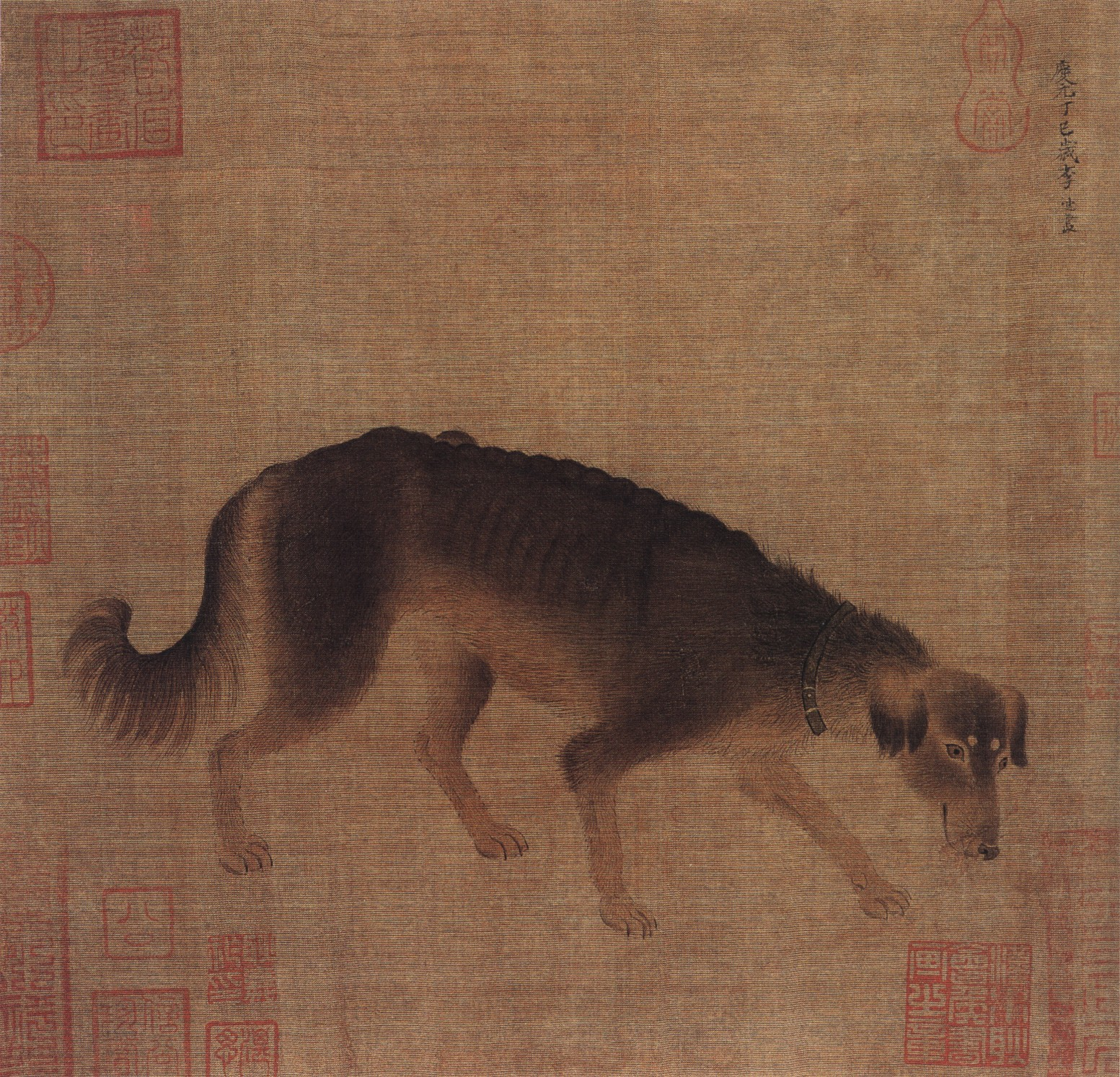
Hunting Dog by Li Di, 12th-century Chinese painting

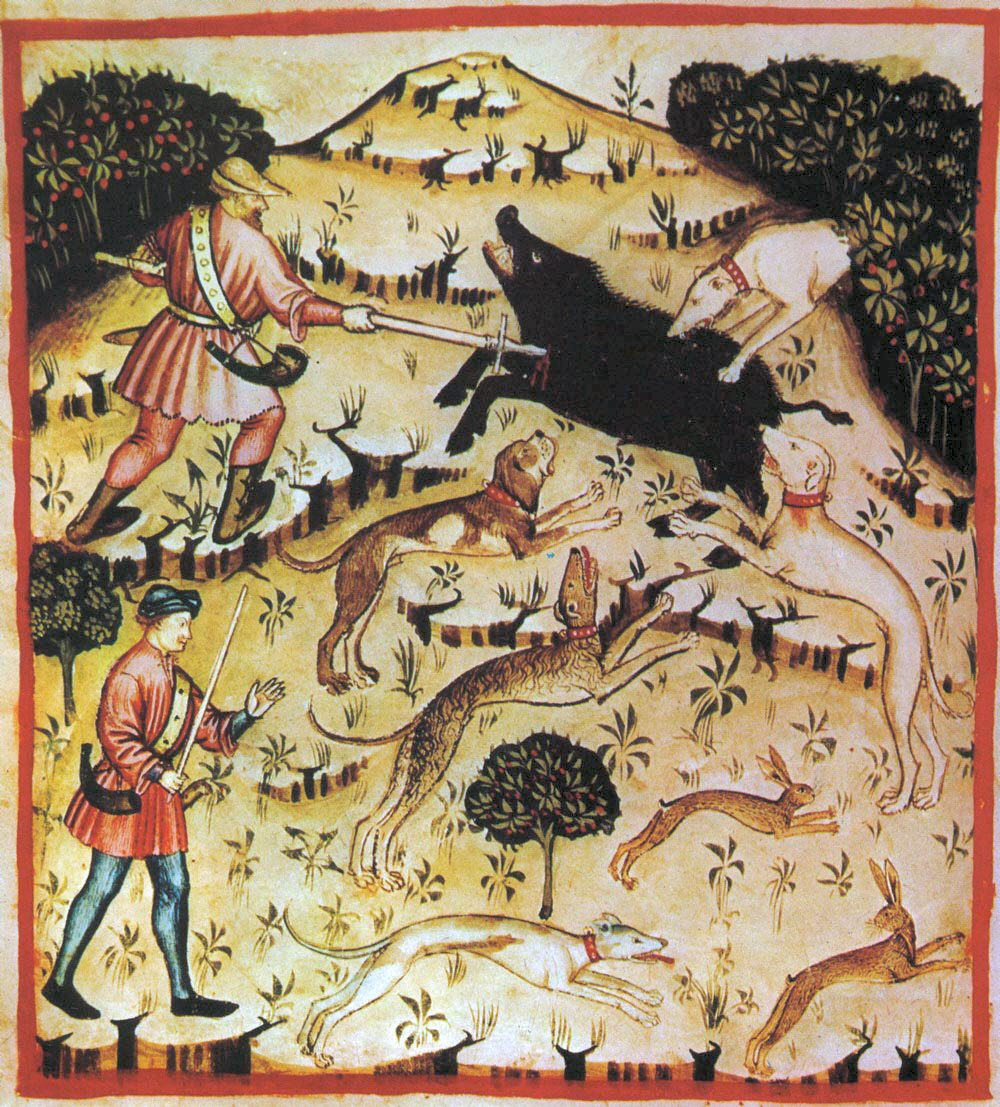
Boar hunting, tacuinum sanitatis casanatensis (14th century)

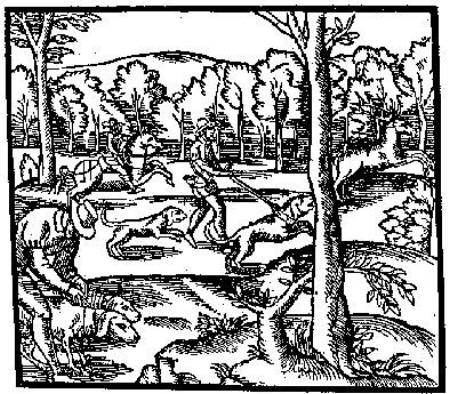
Hunting the hart (16th Century) from Turbervile, copied from Jaques du Fouilloux.

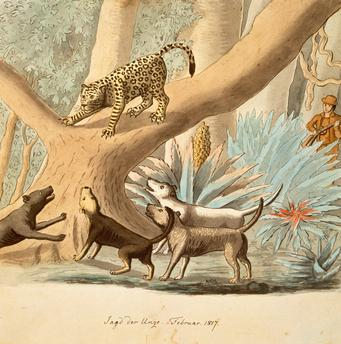
Filas Brasileiros hunting a jaguar.

== See also ==
- Canes Venatici – Constellation in the northern celestial hemisphere, hunting dogs constellation
- Wolf hunting with dogs – Method of wolf hunting
- Working dog – Dog trained to perform practical tasks
- Key Underwood Coon Dog Memorial Graveyard
