= Elkhound =

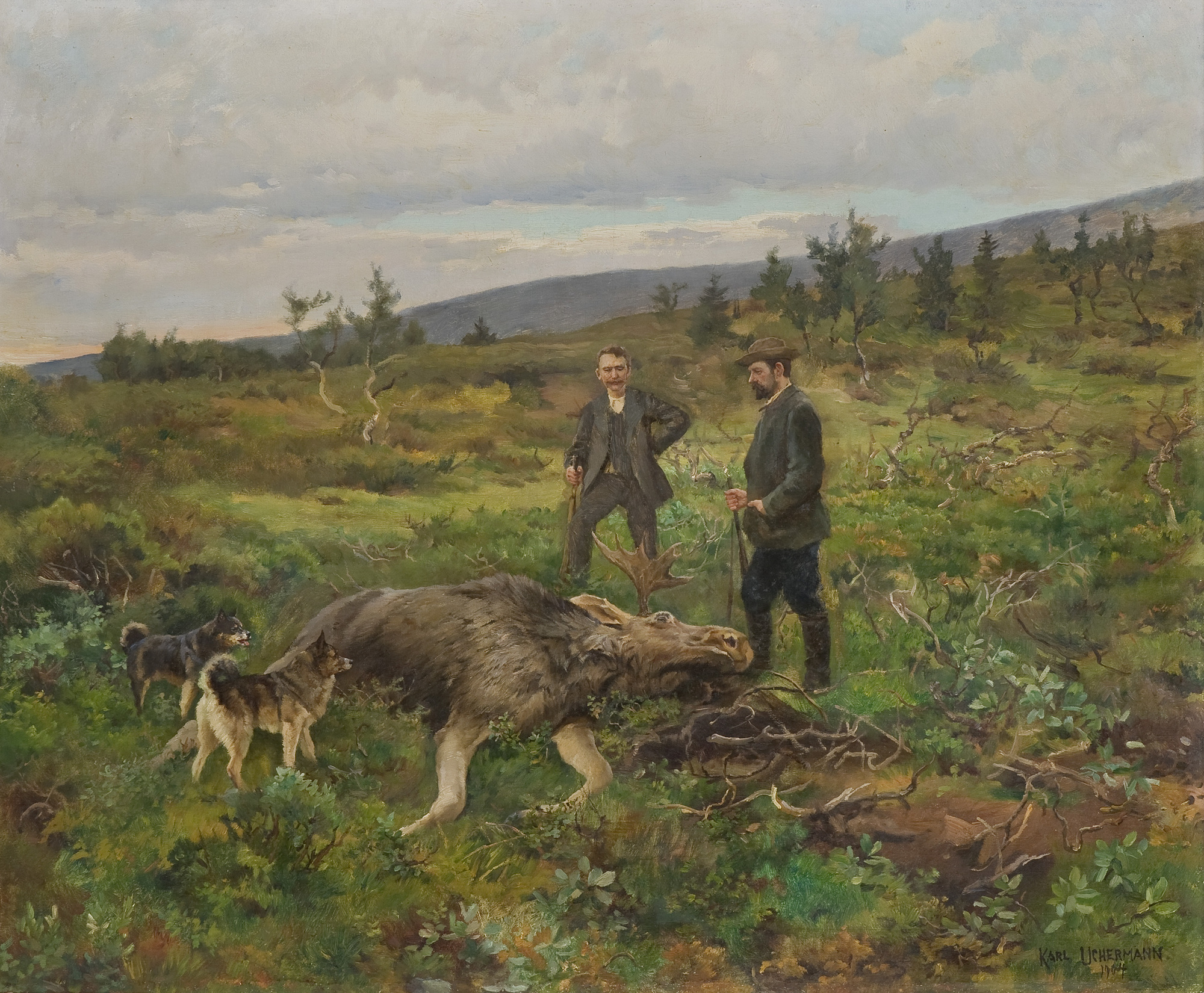
Moose Hunt (1904)

Elkhounds are a group of Fennoscandian dog breeds belonging to the Spitz-type dogs and used for hunting elk/moose and other large animals.

Belonging to this group are among others:

- Norwegian Elkhound or Gray Norwegian Elkhound
- Black Norwegian Elkhound
- Hede Elkhound
- Hällefors Elkhound
- Jämthund, also simply known as Swedish Elkhound,
- Swedish White Elkhound
