= Lapponian Herder =

Lapponian Herder Lapinporokoira
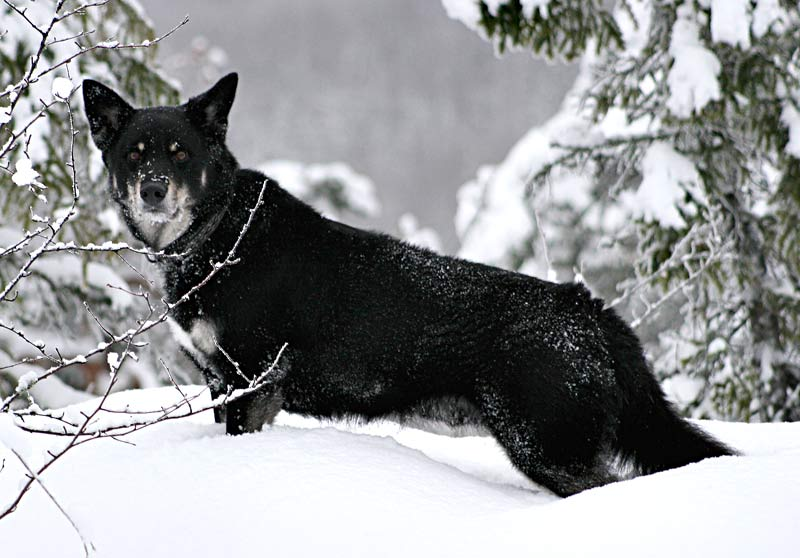
- Other names: Lapland Reindeer Dog, Reindeer Herder, lapinporokoira (Finnish), lapsk vallhund (Swedish)
- Origin: Finland
Traits
Height	Males	51 cm
	Females	46 cm
Kennel club standards
- Suomen Kennelliitto: standard
- Fédération Cynologique Internationale: standard

The Lapponian Herder (Finnish: Lapinporokoira [ˈlɑpinˌporoˌkoi̯rɑ]) or Lapp Reindeer Dog or Lapsk Vallhund is a breed of dog from Finland, one of three Lapphund breeds developed from a type of dog used by the Sami people for herding and guarding their reindeer.

== Appearance ==
The Lapinporokoira is a medium-sized dog, with medium length fur in a double coat. Ears are pricked (standing up; drop ears are a disqualifying fault.) Colour is generally black or dark grey or brown, and occasionally red brown, with a lighter shade on the head and lower parts of the body, often with white markings. Medium in build, height should be 51 cm (20 in) at the withers for males, 46 cm (18 in) for females. Males and females should look distinctly different. Weight is between 55–65 lb (25–29 kg), males usually heavier than females.

== Temperament ==
The breed standard states that the dog should be calm, friendly, and docile, but also energetic. Most herding breeds need to be given regular exercise. The temperament of individual dogs may vary.

== Activities ==
The Lapponian Herder can participate in dog agility trials, carting, mushing, obedience, Rally obedience, showmanship, flyball, tracking, and herding events. Herding instincts and trainability can be measured at noncompetitive herding tests. Lapponian Herders exhibiting basic herding instincts can be trained to compete in herding trials.

== History ==
The Sami people of northern Europe used Spitz type herding dogs in managing their herds of reindeer for a very long time. Such dogs were not of modern breeds of documented heritage, and did not have a fixed appearance, but rather were a landrace type of herding dog. Although Swedish and Finnish dog fanciers began collecting information about the type in the 1930s, most of the dogs were lost as a result of World War II.

After the war, various breeders in Sweden and Finland began to try to recreate the lost reindeer herding dogs in their various forms. In Finland, the first was recognised as the Kukonharjulainen (a kennel name) by the Finnish Kennel Club. The breed was a few of the herding dogs crossed with black and white Karelian Bear Dogs, resulting in a short-coated dog. Other breeders with another kennel club in Finland created another breed, this one with a more heavy coat, called the Lapponian Herder. In the late 1950s and early 1960s, more dogs were collected, and assigned to one of the two varieties based on their appearance. Around the same time, the two kennel clubs merged, and all the Finnish reindeer dogs were placed in the same registry. In 1966, they were separated again, based on coat length. One breed was renamed Lapphund at that time, and the other was named Lapinporokoira (translated into English as the Lapponian Herder.)

The Lapinporokoira is recognised under Finnish sponsorship as Fédération Cynologique Internationale in Group 5 Spitz and primitive types Section 3 Nordic Watchdogs and Herders. The stud book for the breed remains open. Exported to North America, it is recognised there by the United Kennel Club in the Herding group (the United Kennel Club places the Finnish Lapphund in the Northern Breed Group.) It is also recognised by various minor kennel clubs and internet based dog registry businesses, and promoted as a rare breed for those seeking a unique pet.

=== Lineage ===
The breed falls under the mitochondrial DNA sub-clade referred to as d1 that is only found in northern Scandinavia. It is the result of a female wolf / male dog hybridization that occurred post-domestication. Subclade d1 originated at most 480–3,000 years ago and includes all Sami-related breeds: Finnish Lapphund, Swedish Lapphund, Lapponian Herder, Jamthund, Norwegian Elkhound and Hällefors Elkhound. The maternal wolf sequence that contributed to these breeds has not been matched across Eurasia.

== See also ==
- List of dog breeds
- Finnish Lapphund
- Swedish Lapphund
- Finnish Spitz
