= Hällefors Elkhound =

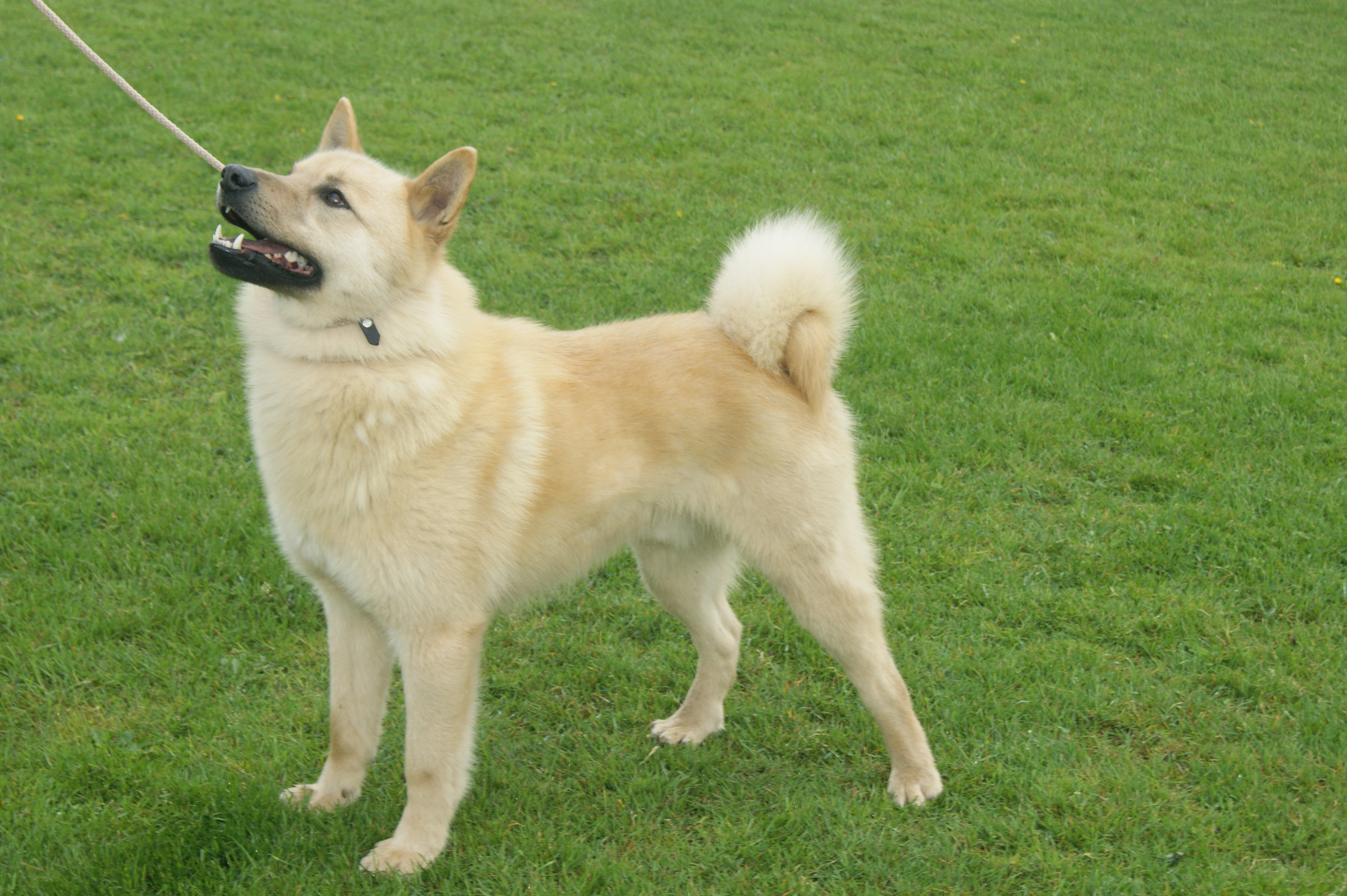
- A Hällefors Elkhound, fawn male
- Other names: Hälleforshund; Hällefors Dog; Hälleforsinkoira
- Origin: Sweden
- Breed status: Not recognized as a breed by any major kennel club.
Traits
Height	Males	55–63 centimetres (22–25 in)
	Females	52–60 centimetres (20–24 in)
- Coat: Medium, thick, harsh and dense coat
- Color: Yellow; with or without a mask
- Notes: Recognized by the Svenska Kennelklubben, the Suomen Kennelliitto and the Norsk Kennel Klub.

Hällefors Elkhound (Swedish: Hälleforshund) is a Swedish dog breed.

== Appearance ==
The Hällefors Elkhound is a medium-sized, rectangular Spitz with either a sickle or curly tail. Thick, harsh, and dense coat should always be yellow, ranging from fawn to reddish. The colour shade is lighter in chest, belly, legs, and below the tail. The average height for males is 55 to 63 cm and for females 52 to 60 cm.

== Behaviour ==
The Hällefors Elkhound is an energetic, courageous, and persistent dog with a strong character.

== History ==
The breed was developed in Svealand, but its more detailed area of origin has been argued. It is stated that despite its name, it was not created in Hällefors, but in Fredriksberg village located in neighbouring Ludvika Municipality. It has mainly been used as a deer-hunting dog and its most remarkable ancestors are the Finnish Spitz and the Ostyak Laika. The Swedish Kennel Club, Svenska Kennelklubben, recognized the breed in 2000 and nowadays it is also recognized in several other Nordic countries, such as Finland and Norway.

== Lineage ==
The breed falls under the mitochondrial DNA sub-clade referred to as d1 that is only found in northern Scandinavia. It is the result of a female wolf-male dog hybridization that occurred post-domestication. Subclade d1 originated 480–3,000 years ago and is found in all Sami-related breeds: the Finnish Lapphund, Swedish Lapphund, Lapponian Herder, Swedish Elkhound, Norwegian Elkhound, Black Norwegian Elkhound and Hällefors Elkhound.

== See also ==
- List of dog breeds
