= East European Shepherd =

Ukrainian and Russian breed of shepherd dog

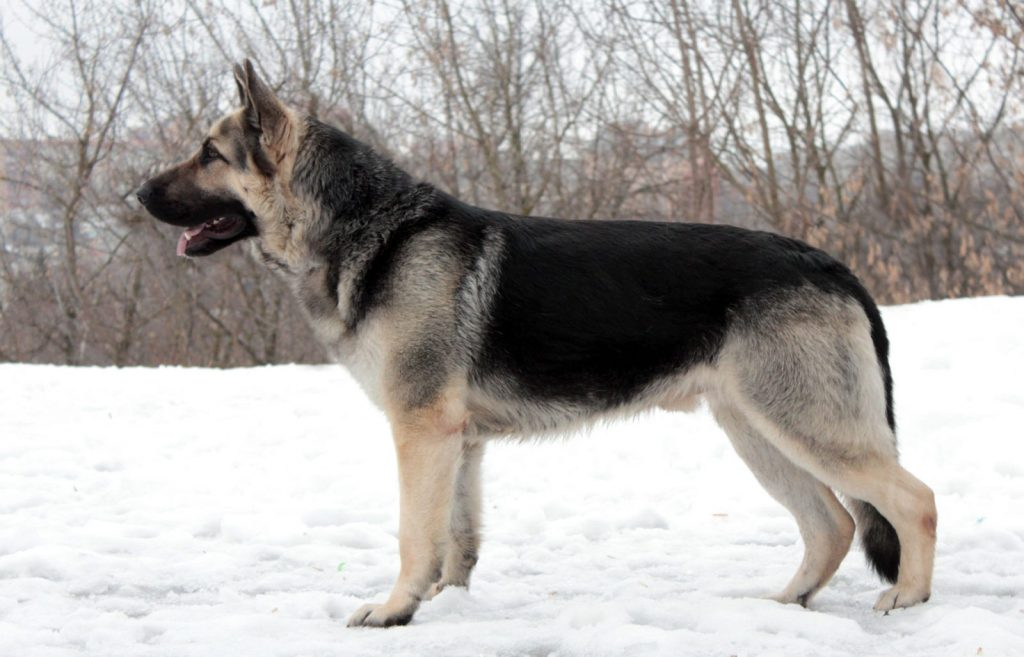
- Other names: Vostochno Evropeiskaya Ovcharka; VEO
- Origin: Soviet Union (Russia, Ukraine)
Traits
Height	Males	67–72 cm (26–28 in)
	Females	62–67 cm (24–26 in)
Kennel club standards
- RKF: standard

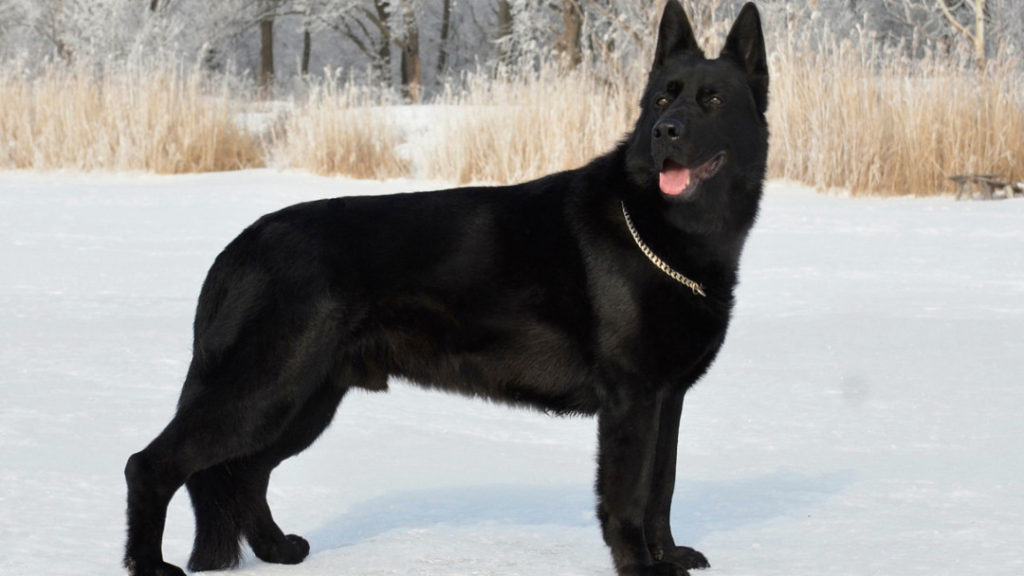
The VEO may be entirely black

The East European Shepherd, also called Vostochno Evropeiskaya Ovcharka (VEO; Russian: Восточно-европейская овчарка, ВЕО, romanized: Vostochno-yevropeyskaya ovcharka, VYeO) is a Ukrainian and Russian breed of shepherd dog. It was selectively bred in the Soviet Union from the German Shepherd to create a larger dog with better resistance to cold conditions, and was intended for military and guard work.

== History ==
The East European Shepherd was bred in the Soviet Union in the early twentieth century. In the 1920s a number of German Shepherds were imported from Germany into the Ukrainian SSR, where a breeding programme was established with the aim of adapting the breed to the harsher Soviet climatic conditions. Over several decades of selective breeding, a distinctly different form of shepherd had been created from that known in the West; from 1950 this was named the Vostochno Evropeiskaya or East European. While initially the breed was centred in Ukraine, it soon spread throughout the Soviet Union, although its fortunes suffered at the Eastern Front during the Second World War. At the end of the War there were substantial imports of German Shepherd dogs from Germany; importation had not been possible before the War.

The East European Shepherd was used heavily by the military and police within the Soviet Union as a guard and sniffer dog. It was a favourite of the KGB, who only ever kept solid black examples; if a single non-black pup was born in a litter bred by the KGB the entire litter was destroyed and that breeding was not repeated. A breed standard was approved in 1955 by the Central Committee of the USSR DOSAAF, and in 1964 by the Presidium of the Service Dog Breeding Federation. The East European Shepherd is now among the most numerous dog breeds in Russia and several former Soviet countries.

With effect from 1 January 2017 the Vostochno Evropeiskaya Ovcharka was recognised by the Nordic Kennel Union, and is thus recognised by the Danish Kennel Club, the Finnish Kennel Club, the Icelandic Kennel Club, the Norwegian Kennel Club and the Swedish Kennel Club.

== Characteristics ==
The East European Shepherd is significantly larger than the German Shepherd and shows substantial sexual dimorphism: dogs typically stand 67 to 72 cm (26 to 28 in) at the withers although some can be as tall as 74 cm (29 in); bitches are typically 62 to 67 cm (24 to 26 in). The coat is dense and of medium length, with a well-developed undercoat, and often with longer soft hair on the ears, neck, limbs and tail. It may be black-and-tan, sable or solid black; brindles or whites are rare. The eyes may be brown, amber or blue; odd-coloured eyes are known. The ears are long and upright, and the paws are large with long toes, giving a snowshoe-like appearance.

The breed is considered particularly intelligent, courageous, determined and tough, and owners often describe its temperament as similar to that of a Dobermann.
