= Black Norwegian Elkhound =

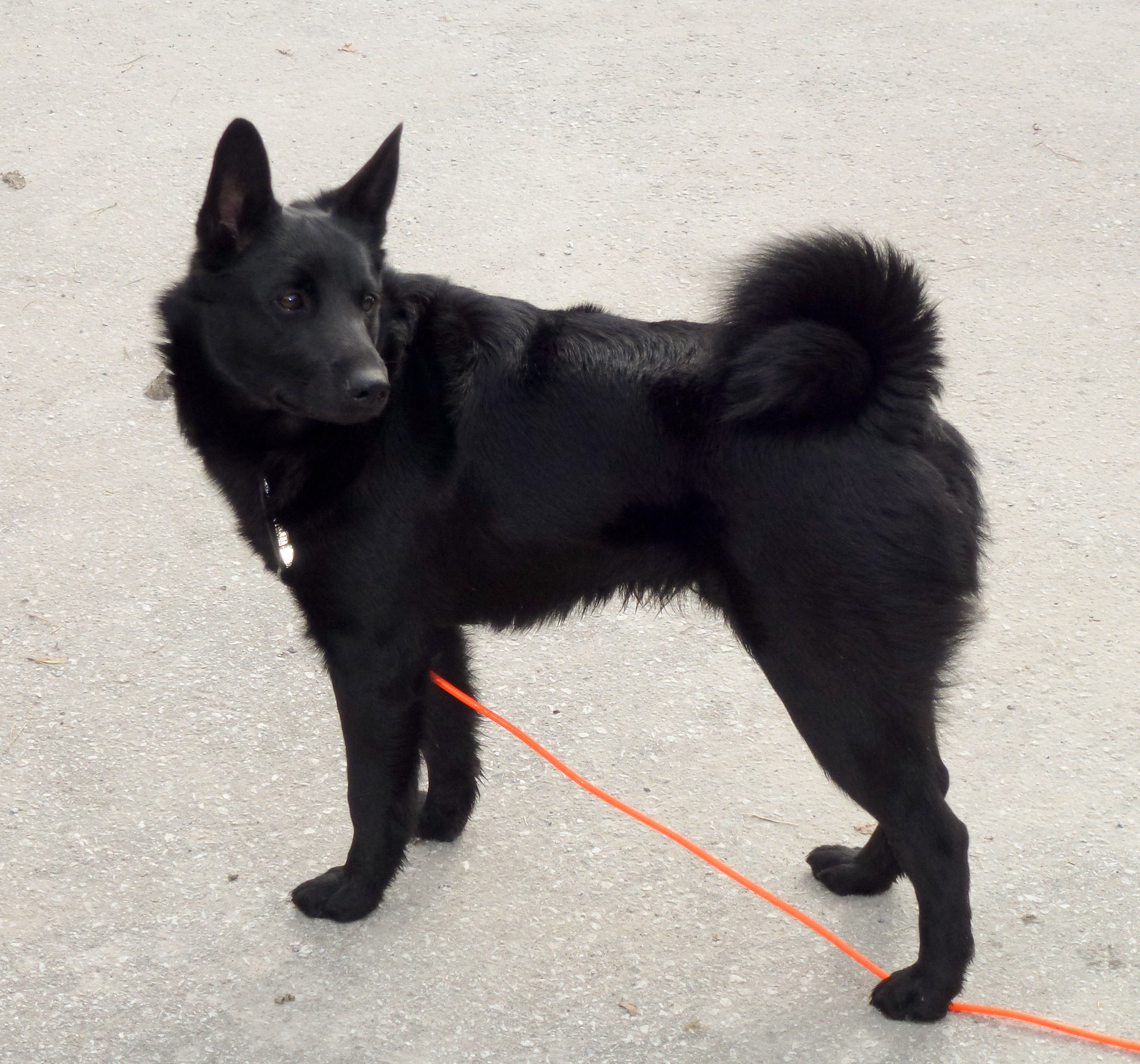
- 1 year old Black Norwegian Elkhound
- Other names: Norsk Elghund Svart; Norsk Elghund Black; Black Elkhound; Norwegian Moose Dog (black)
- Origin: Norway
Traits
Height	Males	46–49 cm (18–19 in)
	Females	43–46 cm (17–18 in)
- Weight: 16–20 kg (35–44 lb)
- Coat: Dense, short double coat
- Colour: Black
Kennel club standards
- Fédération Cynologique Internationale: standard

The Black Norwegian Elkhound (Norwegian Elghund Sort (NES) in Norwegian) is a small Spitz breed classified by the FCI as a hunting dog. It is currently an uncommon breed in Norway and very rare outside the Nordic countries of Scandinavia. It is a sibling breed to a Grey Norwegian Elkhound, but is smaller, more agile, doesn't bark and was bred explicitly for on-leash dog hunting.

Historically, the Black Norwegian Elkhound has originated from local spitz dog population in the border areas between Norway and Sweden, and has existed as its own breed since the mid-19th century. The breed name "Elkhound" comes directly from its original Norwegian name "Elghund," meaning ""elk dog" or "moose dog." In Norwegian, "elg" refers to the animal English speakers know as an "elk" (in Eurasia) or "moose" (in the United States), and "hund" means "dog."

In literature the breed is mentioned by the Welshman Llewelyn Lloyd. In 1828, he hunted bear game near the border areas between Norway and Sweden. He was particularly pleased with two dogs he borrowed: "Hector was black, had upright ears and a curled tail, and Pajas, for whom 13 bears had been shot, was coal black with a bushy tail".

The Black Norwegian Elkhound has previously been threatened with extinction. The breed has retained its good utility properties and characteristic exterior for over 100 years. There is now increasing demand for black elkhounds and it is difficult to reach a number of offspring per year that saturates this market. The number of litters and the number of puppies have remained stable over the past 20 years.

== Description ==
=== Appearance ===
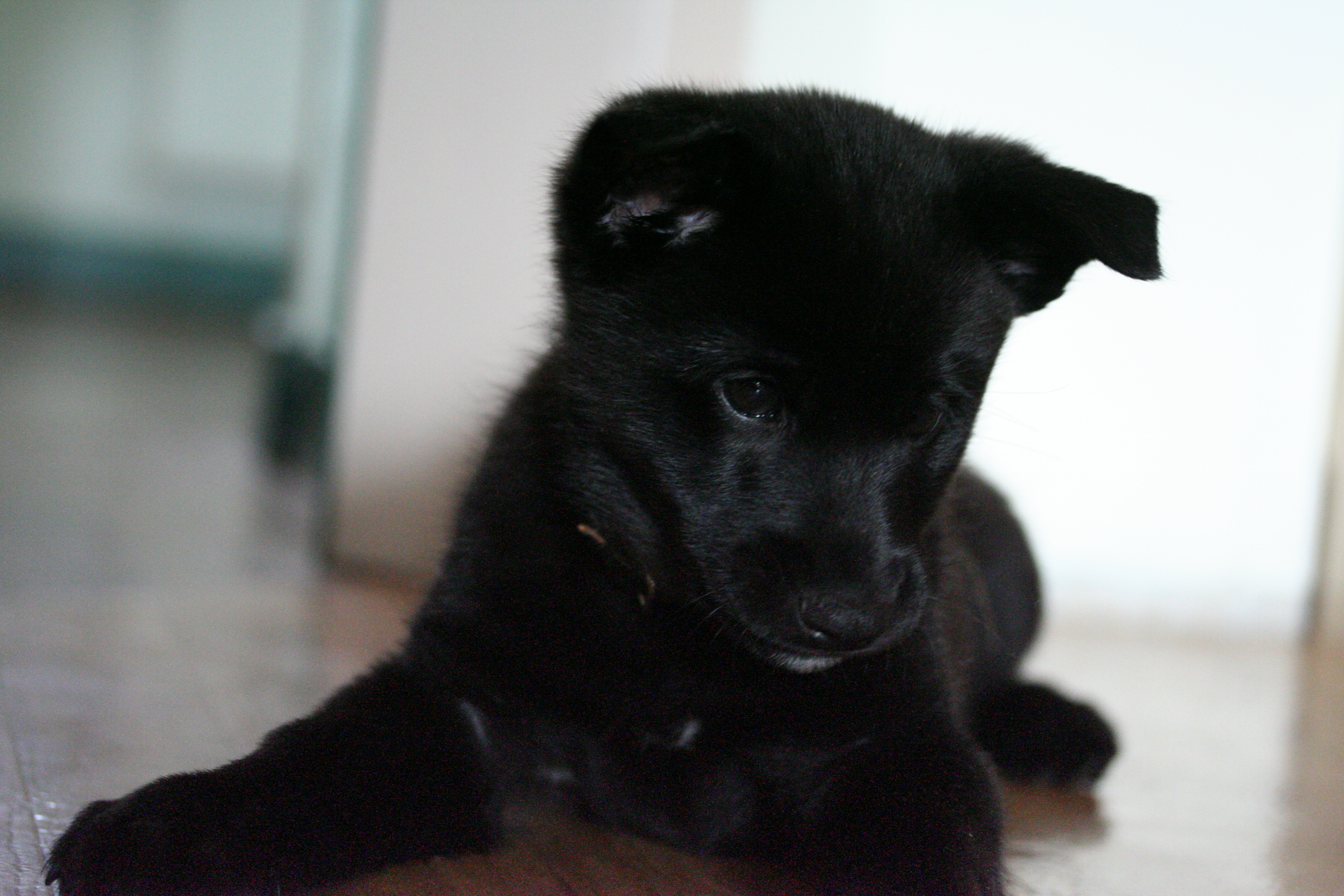
Black Norwegian Elkhound puppy

The Black Norwegian Elkhound is a Spitz breed with a short compact body, dark eyes, ears standing straight up, and a curly tail carried over the back. It has a coat that does not stand out from the body. This is an all-weather hunting dog. It is able to keep out autumn rain in Scandinavia and endure the cold weather.

It has a dense, short, thick, coarse, double coat and is solid black. A mature dog stands between 40 and 51 centimeters (16"–20") — 47 cm (+3/-4) for males and 44 cm (+3/-4) for females — and weighs between 16 kilograms (35 lb) and 20 kilograms (44 lb).

=== Temperament ===
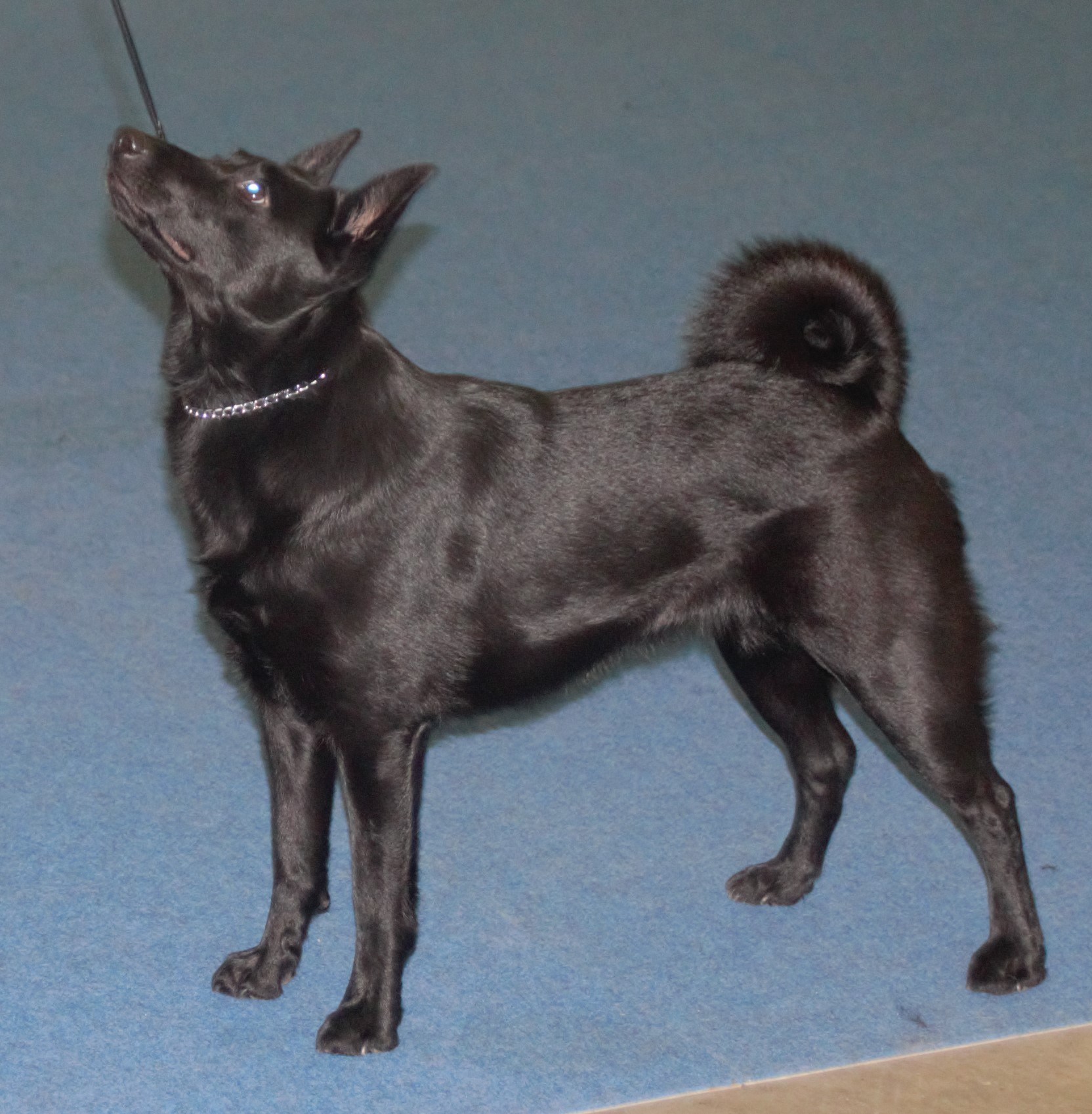
Black Norwegian Elkhound at a show

The Black Norwegian Elkhound is an all purpose family dog. They are highly intelligent, have a calm temperament, and rarely bark. They are tolerant with children, smaller pets, and other dogs. They enjoy physical contact with humans, such as petting, and prefer to be near family members.

==== Hunting ====
The Black Elkhound is used primarily in hunting large game such as moose, deer, and bear. This dog is bred for on-leash dog hunting and has the ability to cooperate well with the handlers. The black Elkhound primarily picks up the smell in the air, so it jumps to a higher ground to pick up the scent, which also makes it an excellent search dog. As opposed to grey elkhounds, the black breed rarely barks. It behaves calmly and silently in contact with game so that the hunter can approach the game undetected and take a precise shot.

==== Breeding ====
It is important for the black elkhound breed to focus on preventing inbreeding. Based on Norwegian kennel club's 5% rule, each male dog for the breed should not have more than 40 registered offspring. It is planned to introduce a new breed requirement that both parent animals are genetically tested for hereditary glaucoma and ataxia. The Norwegian breeding committee currently only approves matings where one of the dogs is known to be free of hereditary glaucoma. There is a requirement for a known hip displasia status for all the dogs to be used in breeding. Statistics in relation to HD over the last 10 years show that 83.2% of Norwegian Elghund Sort are free from hip displasia type F.

== Care ==
=== Grooming ===
The fur requires moderate care and it is recommended to brush the coat two or three times a week. Dense and stiff, but smooth. On the head and the front of the legs dense and smooth, furthest on the chest and neck, on the thighs and the back of the front legs, as well as on the underside of the tail. The fur is formed by longer wispy cover hairs, with soft black undercoat.

The Black Elkhound dog fur is considered to be hypoallergenic and works for many people who are allergic to dogs. It is still notable that no dog is perfectly allergy friendly.

== See also ==
- List of dog breeds
- Finnish Lapphund
- Karelian Bear Dog
- Norwegian Buhund
- Norwegian Elkhound
- Norwegian Lundehund
- Swedish Elkhound
- Swedish Lapphund
- Swedish Vallhund

== Resources ==
- Books
  - Norwegian Elkhound (Comprehensive Owner's Guide), 2005.
  - Norwegian Elkhounds by Anna Katherine Nicholas. TFH, 1997.
  - The Norwegian Elkhound (Pure Bred) by Nina P. Ross, PhD. Doral, 1995.
  - The Elkhound in the British Isles by Anne Roslin-Williams. Witherby & Co., 1993.
  - My 60 Years with Norwegian Elghunds by Olav P. Campbell, 1988.
  - The New Complete Norwegian Elkhound, revised edition, by Olav Wallo. Howell, 1987.
  - Norwegian Elkhounds by Anna Katherine Nicholas. TFH, 1983.
  - Great Gray Dogs: The Norwegian Elkhound Factbook, 2nd edition. Great Gray Dogs, 1980.
  - Your Norwegian Elkhound by Helen E. Franciose and Nancy C. Swanson. Denlinger, 1974.
  - How to Raise and Train a Norwegian Elkhound by Glenna Clark Crafts. TFH, 1973. Reprint of the 1964 book with a different cover.
- Magazine Articles
  - Dearth, Kim D.R. "The Norwegian Elkhound" Dog World September 1999, Vol. 84 Issue 9, p12-17.
  - "Dog of the Vikings" Dog Fancy. April 1998.
  - "Norwegian Elkhound". Dog World. July 1997, Vol. 82 Issue 7. p86.
