= Swedish Vallhund =

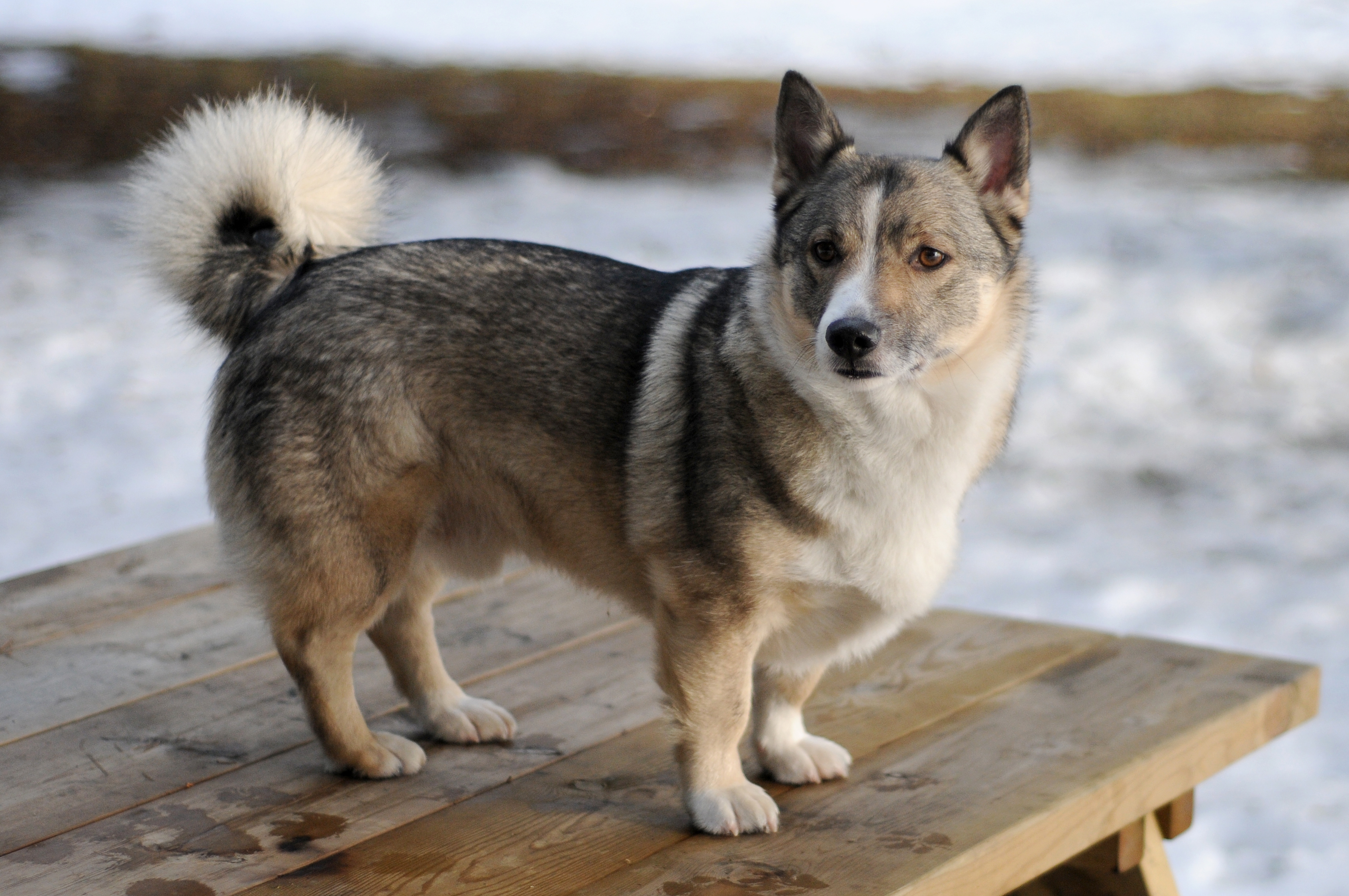
- Other names: Swedish cattle dog Swedish Shepherd; Västgötaspets
- Origin: Sweden
Kennel club standards
- Fédération Cynologique Internationale: standard

The Swedish Vallhund, also known as the Västgötaspets and Swedish cow dog, is a breed of dog native to Sweden. The breed's name, Vallhund, when translated into English, means herding dog, as the Swedish Vallhund was originally bred as a drover and herder of cows over 1,000 years ago. In 1942, the dog came close to extinction, but careful breeding and publicity by Swedish national Björn von Rosen and K. G. Zettersten managed to revive the breed in popularity and save it from its likely end. In 1943, the Swedish Kennel Club recognized the Swedish Vallhund as a breed, and officially categorized the Swedish Vallhund as "the Västgötaspets" ("Westrogothian Spitz") for Västergötland, the province in which their revival took place. Since then, the breed has been recognized by, and bred in, over ten countries and has gained some popularity.

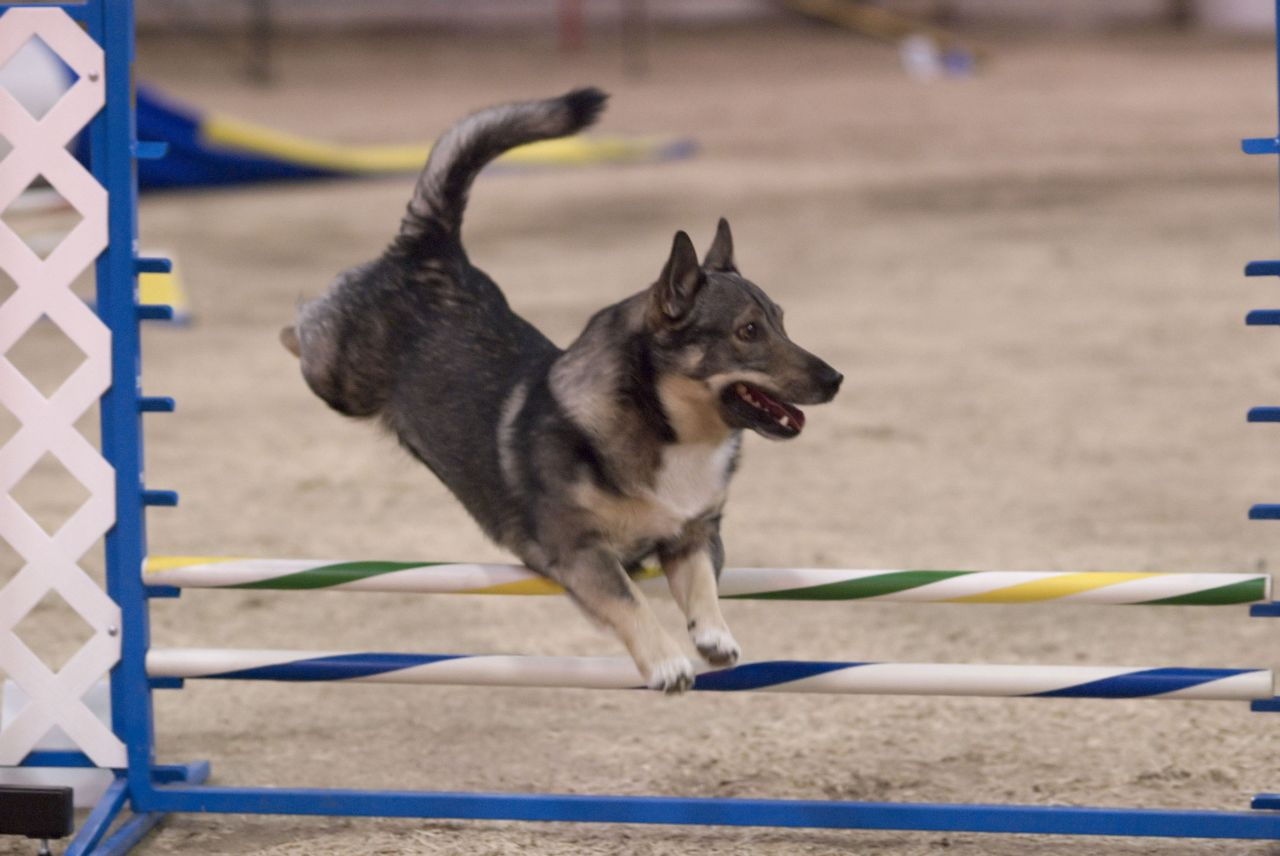
Swedish Vallhund in an agility competition

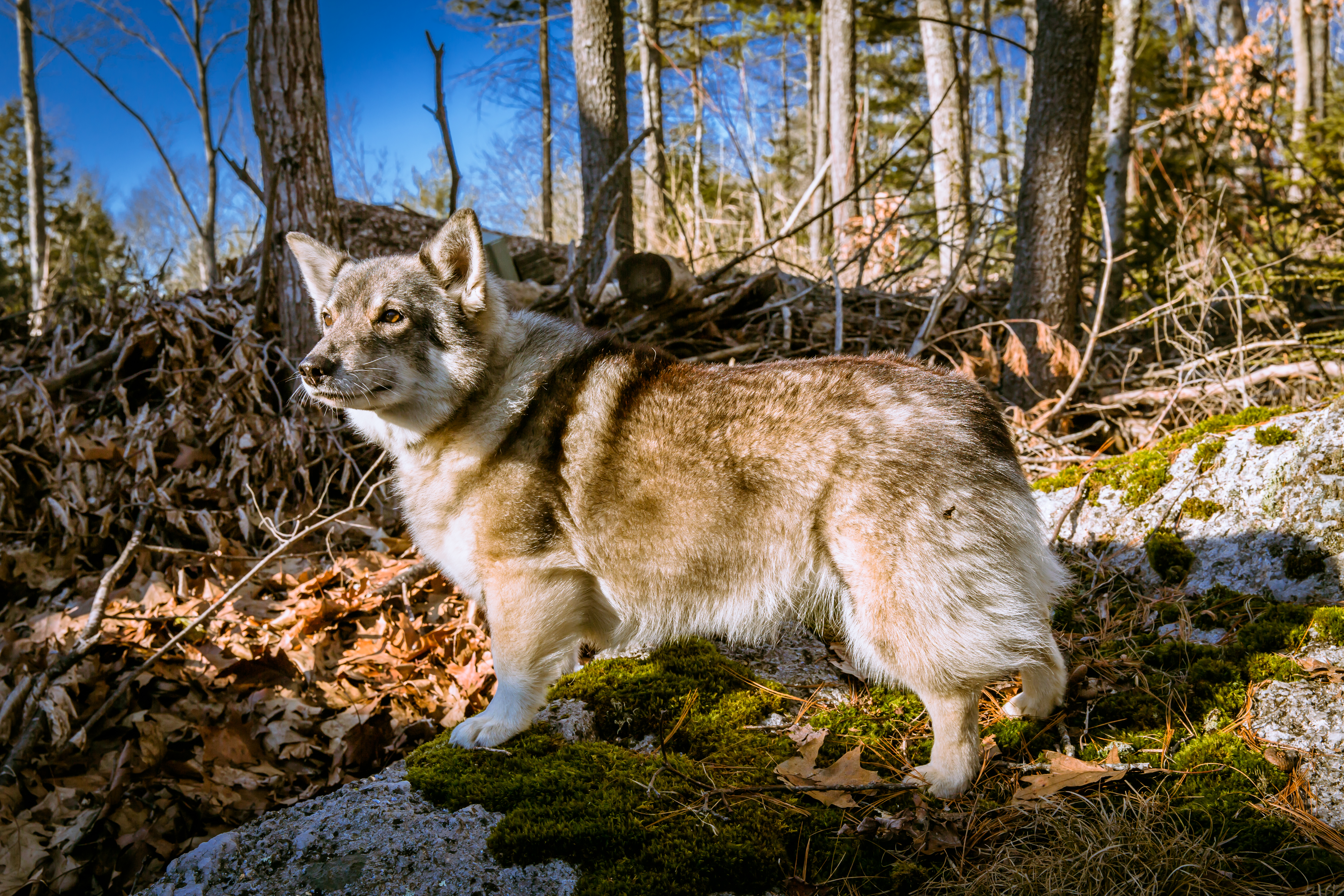
Swedish Vallhund

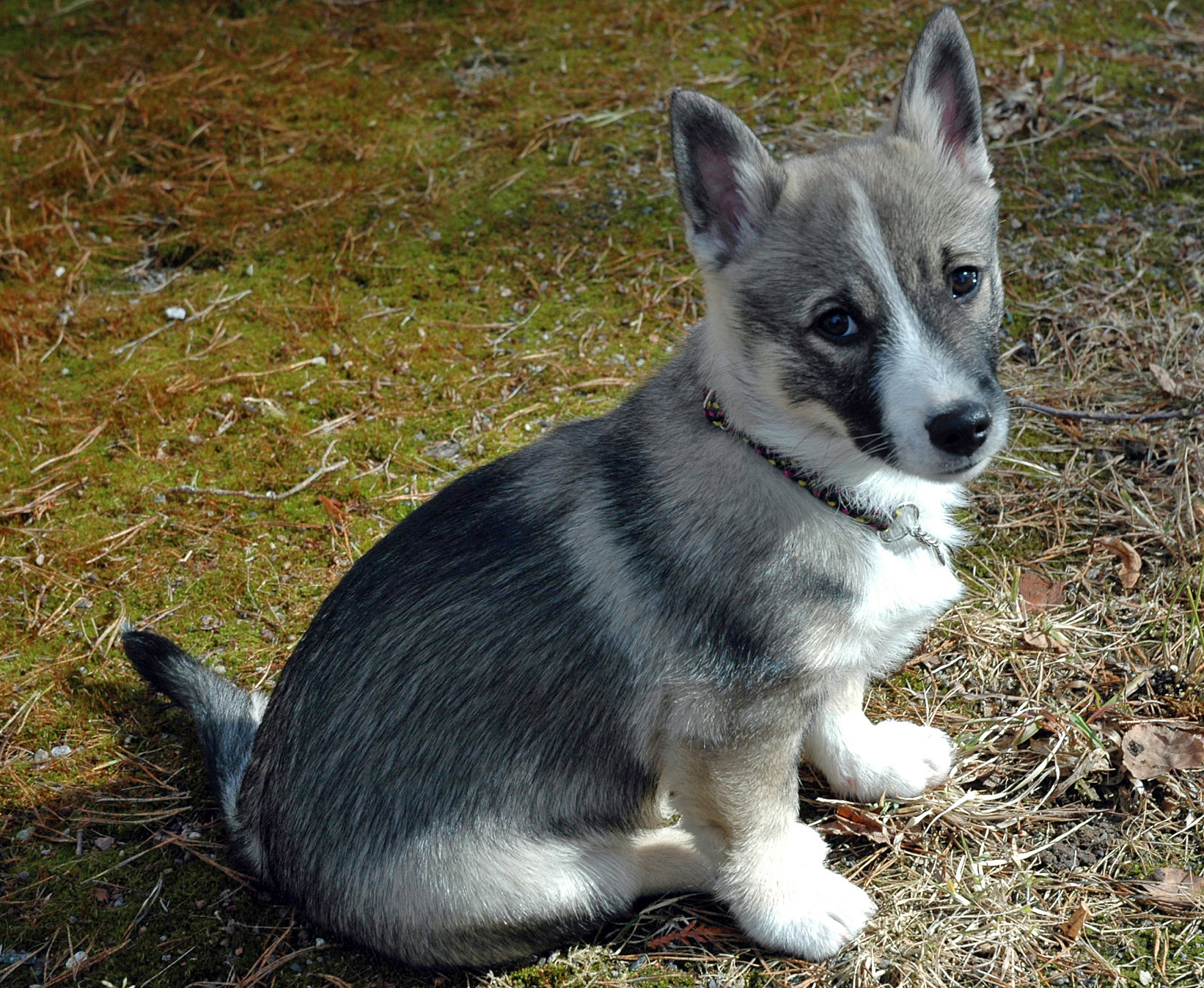
A Swedish Vallhund puppy

== Physical features ==
The average height of the Swedish Vallhund, measured at the withers, is approximately 33 cm (12.9 in) for males and 31 cm (12.2 in) for females. They are strong, with a long body. The ratio of height to body length is about 2:3. The head of the Vallhund is wedge-shaped, with dark brown oval eyes and pricked ears. They are born with every variance of tail length, from no tail at all to full length, therefore they are often mistaken for having been docked. (Tail docking is illegal in Sweden.)

== Colour and coat ==
The coat is short and harsh, with a tight topcoat and a soft, dense undercoat. The hair on the foreparts of the legs is slightly longer than that of the neck, chest and back parts of the hind legs. Fur color varies from grey, greyish brown and greyish yellow to reddish brown, with darker hair on the back, neck, and sides of the body. Lighter hair in the same shade of color as mentioned above can be seen on the muzzle, throat, chest, belly, buttocks, feet and hocks. They have lighter markings on their shoulders, also known as harness markings. Some dogs have white patches which appear, to a small extent, as a narrow blaze, neckstop or slight necklace, as well as having white markings on their fore and hindlegs and on the chest. The maximum is 30% white.

== Health and lifespan ==
The Swedish Vallhund is generally a healthy dog. Its small stature contributes to its longevity, with an average lifespan of 15 years. Its pointy ears mean that—unlike dog breeds with long, hanging ears—ear problems are rare. This breed does well in hot climates because of its double layer coat, as long as the dog is provided cool shade and water. The breed does not do well in very deep snow because of its short legs. The Vallhund has an inherited type of progressive retinal atrophy disease in 34.9% of the population, which appears as mild to moderate night-blindness around the age of ten.

== Activities ==
The Vallhund can compete in a variety of sports including dog agility trials, obedience, rally obedience, showmanship, flyball, tracking, hiking, and herding events. Herding instincts and trainability can be measured at noncompetitive herding tests. Vallhunds that exhibit basic herding instincts can be trained to compete in herding trials.

== History ==
The Swedish Vallhund is an ancient, national dog breed of Sweden and may date back to the 8th or 9th century. Swedish Vallhunds originated in the province of Västergötland, which lies just south of lake Vänern. Here the small dog proved to be excellent for watching, guarding and herding. The breed dates to the Viking settlement of England and is thought to have played a part in the development of the modern Welsh Corgi and the Lancashire Heeler. According to the American Kennel Club, another theory of the breed's origin is that during the eighth or ninth century "either the Swedish Vallhund was brought to Wales or the Corgi was taken to Sweden, hence the similarities between the two breeds".

The Swedish Vallhund is related to larger spitz dogs and moose hunting dogs of Scandinavia. Large dogs of this spitz-type have been found buried with their masters in Stone-Age settlements in Scandinavia.

Swedish Vallhund

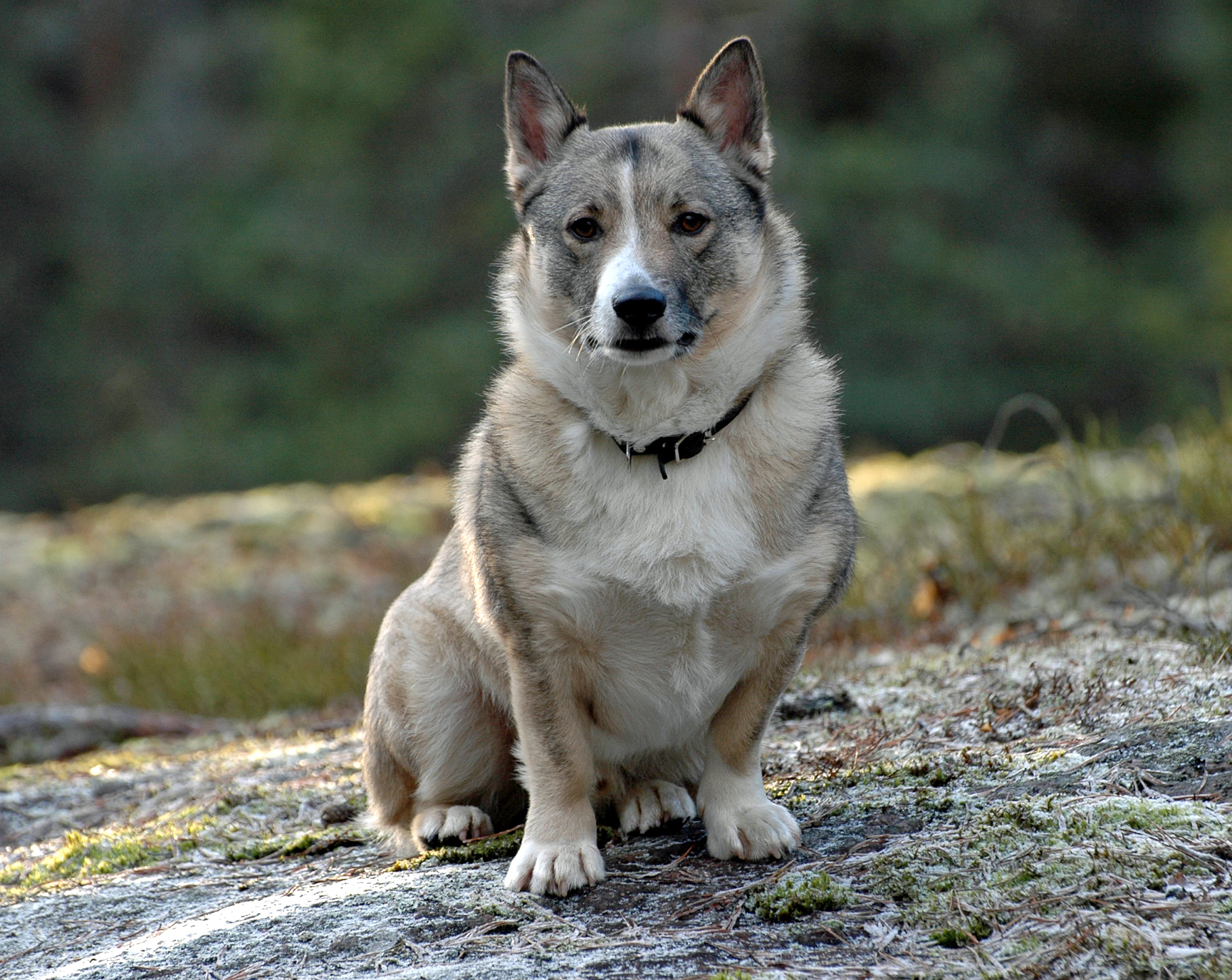
Swedish Vallhund

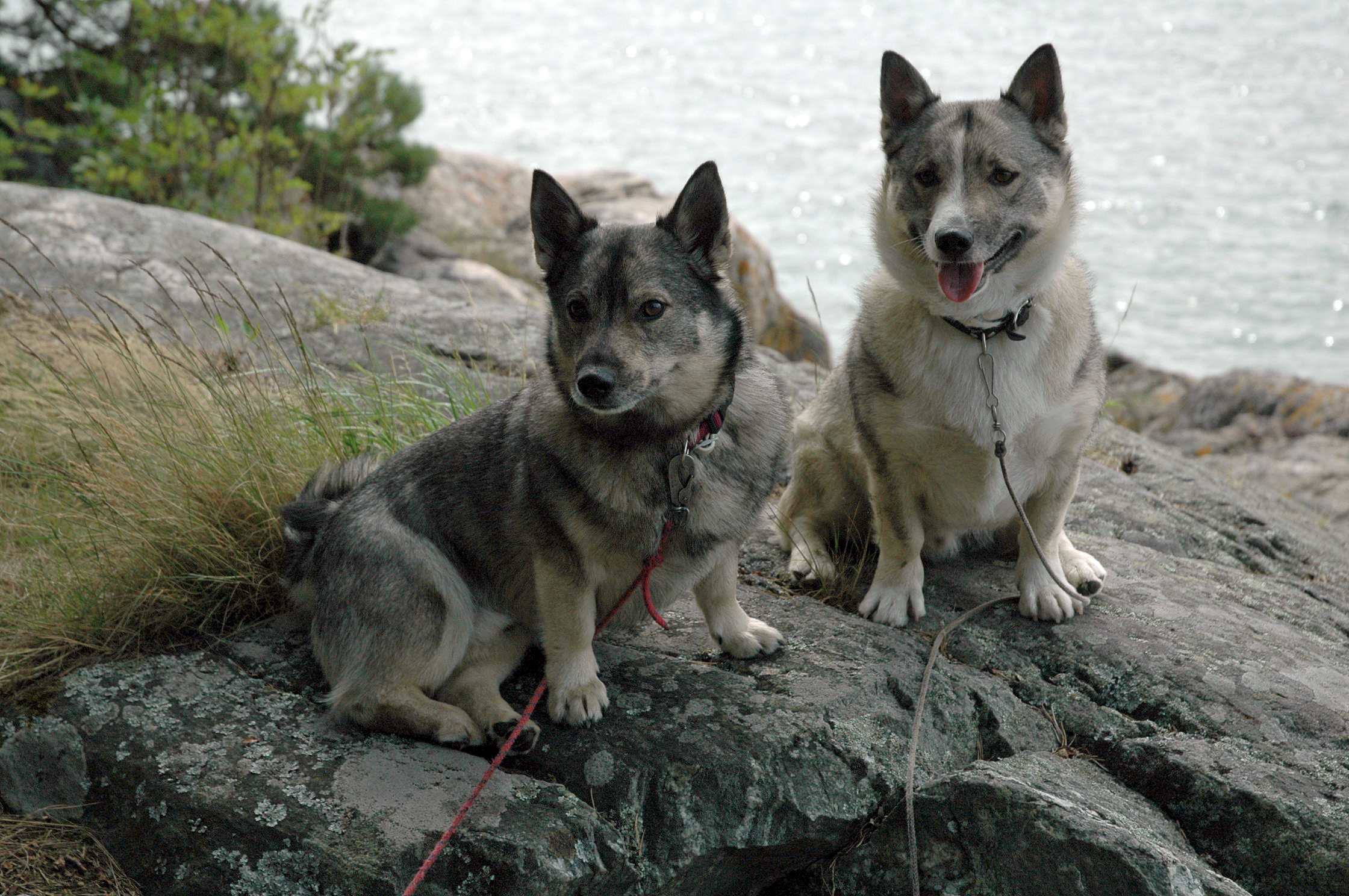
Two dogs out in the woods

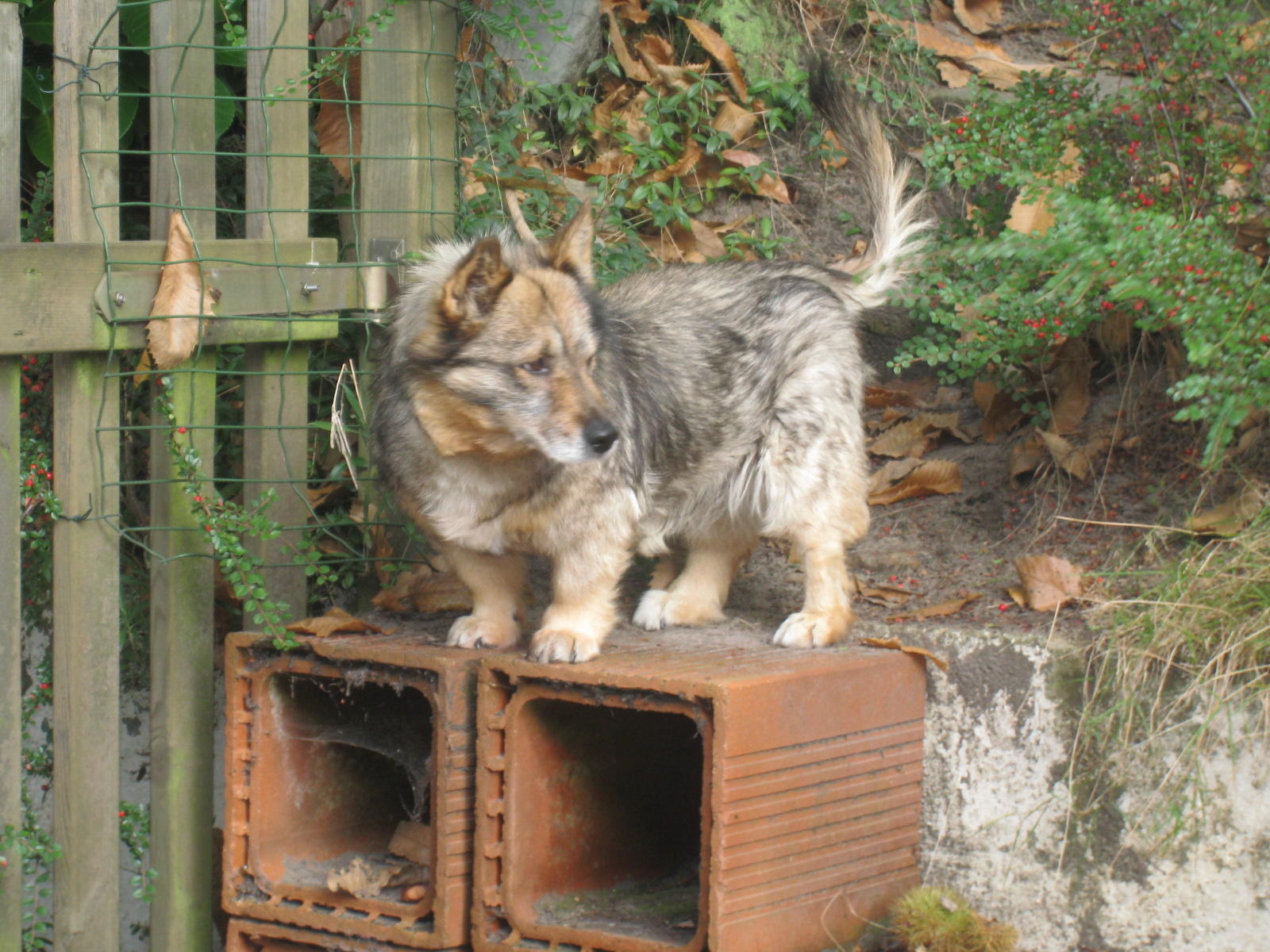
Swedish Vallhund with long tail that is not curly

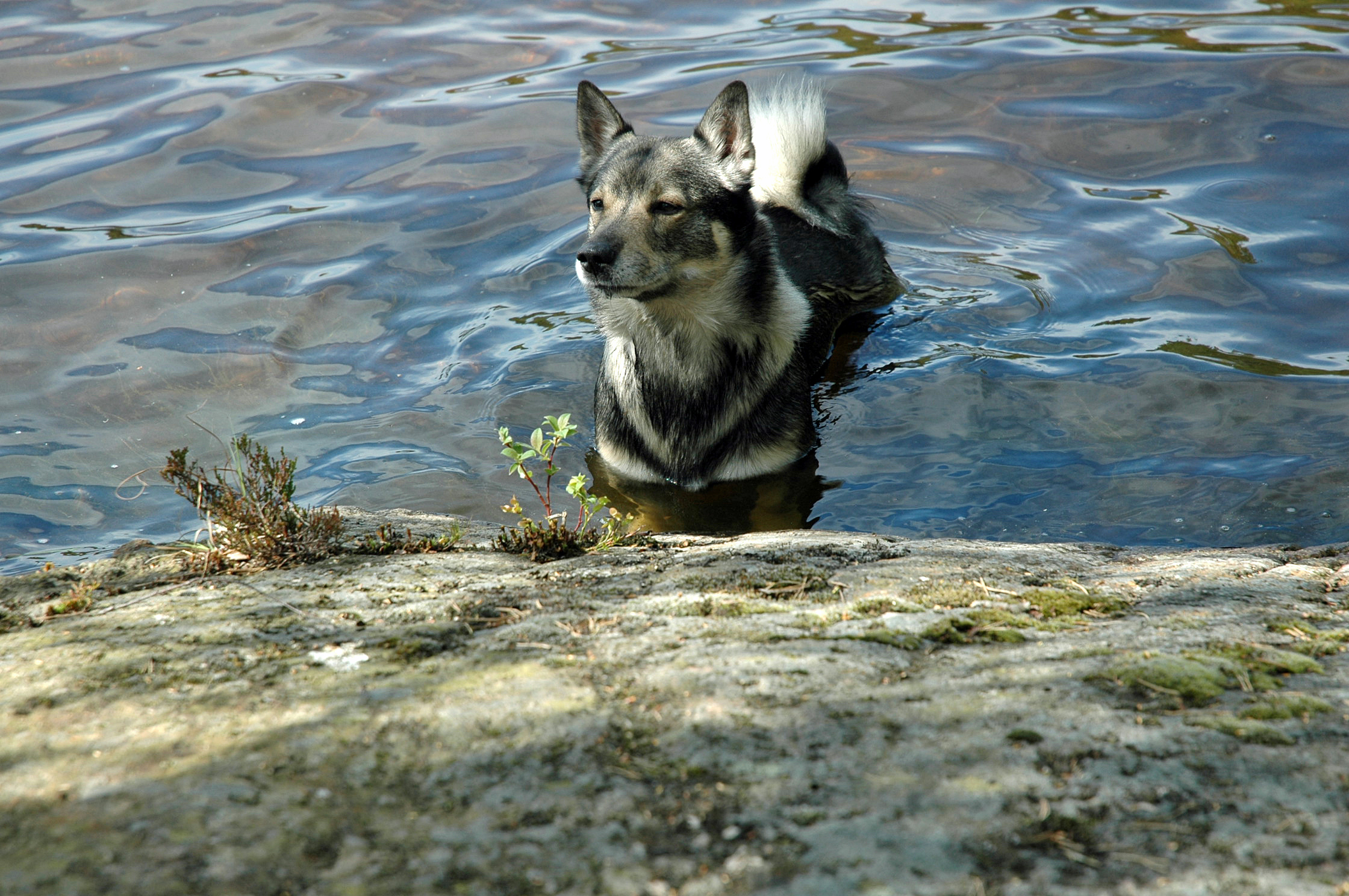
Swedish Vallhund in the lake, curly tail

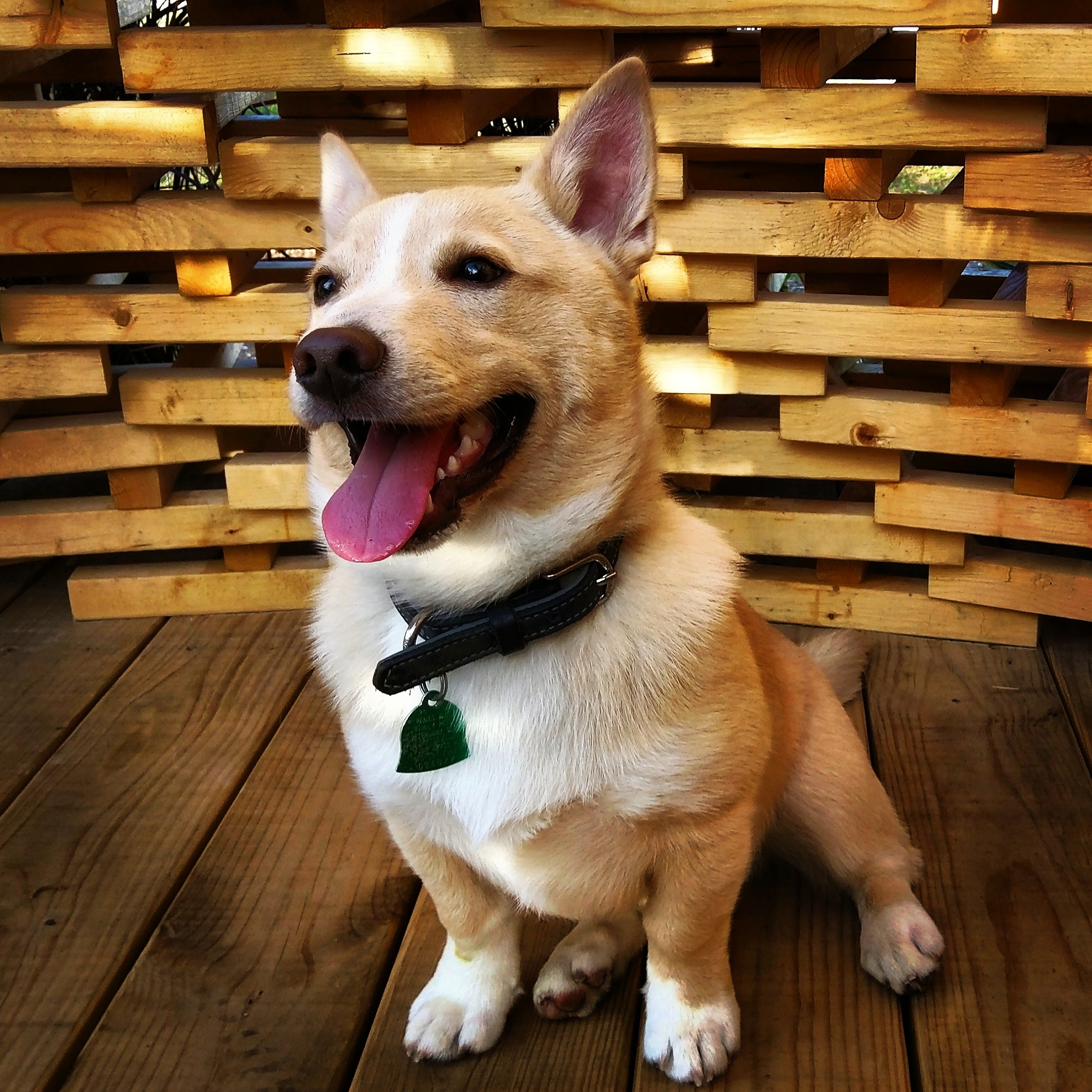
The Vallhund may have many coat variations

== See also ==
- List of dog breeds
