= Finnish Lapphund =

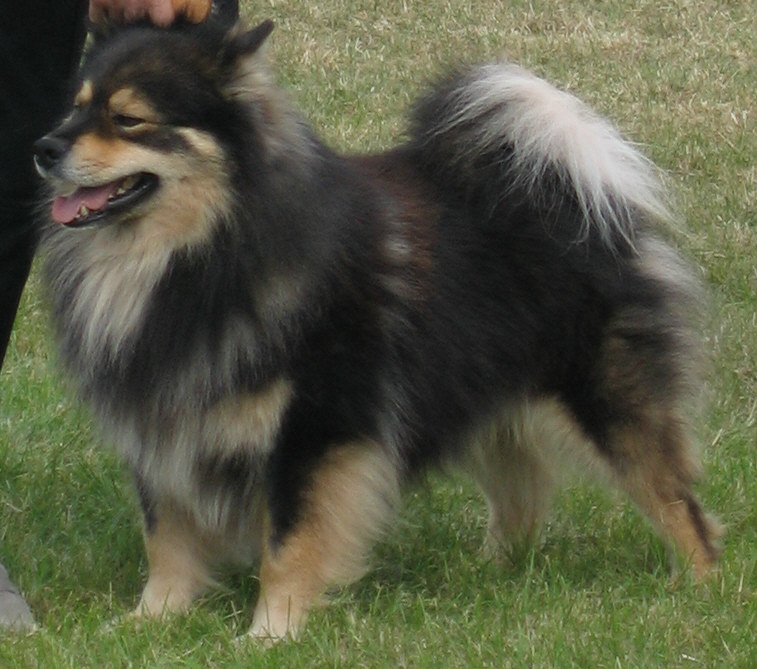
- Other names: Finnish Lapponian Dog (FCI name); Lapinkoira; Suomenlapinkoira
Kennel club standards
- Suomen Kennelliitto: standard
- Fédération Cynologique Internationale: standard

The Finnish Lapphund (or Finnish Lapponian Dog) (Finnish: Suomenlapinkoira [ˈsuo̯menˌlɑpinˌkoi̯rɑ]) is a hardy, easy-going, medium-size breed of Spitz type. Traditionally it has been used for herding reindeer. Although it is one of the most popular dog breeds in its native country, Finland, it is not very numerous outside of the Nordic countries.

== Lineage ==
The breed falls under the mitochondrial DNA sub-clade referred to as d1 that is only found in northern Scandinavia. It is the result of a female wolf-male dog hybridization that occurred post-domestication. Subclade d1 originated "at most 480–3,000 years ago" and is found in all Sami-related breeds: Finnish Lapphund, Swedish Lapphund, Lapponian Herder, Jamthund, Norwegian Elkhound and Hällefors Elkhound. The maternal wolf sequence that contributed to these breeds has not been matched across Eurasia and its branch on the phylogenetic tree is rooted in the same sequence as the 33,000 year-old Altai dog (not a direct ancestor).

Refer: Ancient dog-wolf hybridization

== Appearance ==
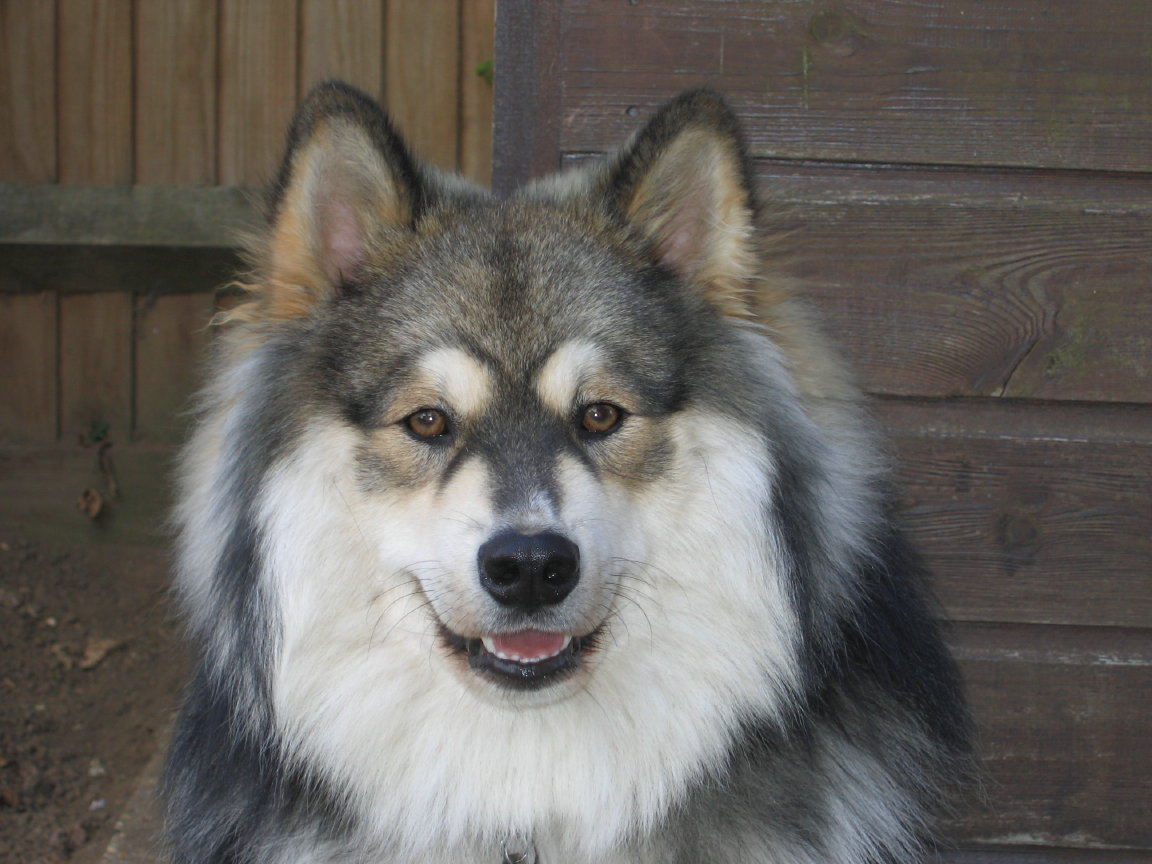
Distinctive facial markings and mane on a wolf-sable coloured male

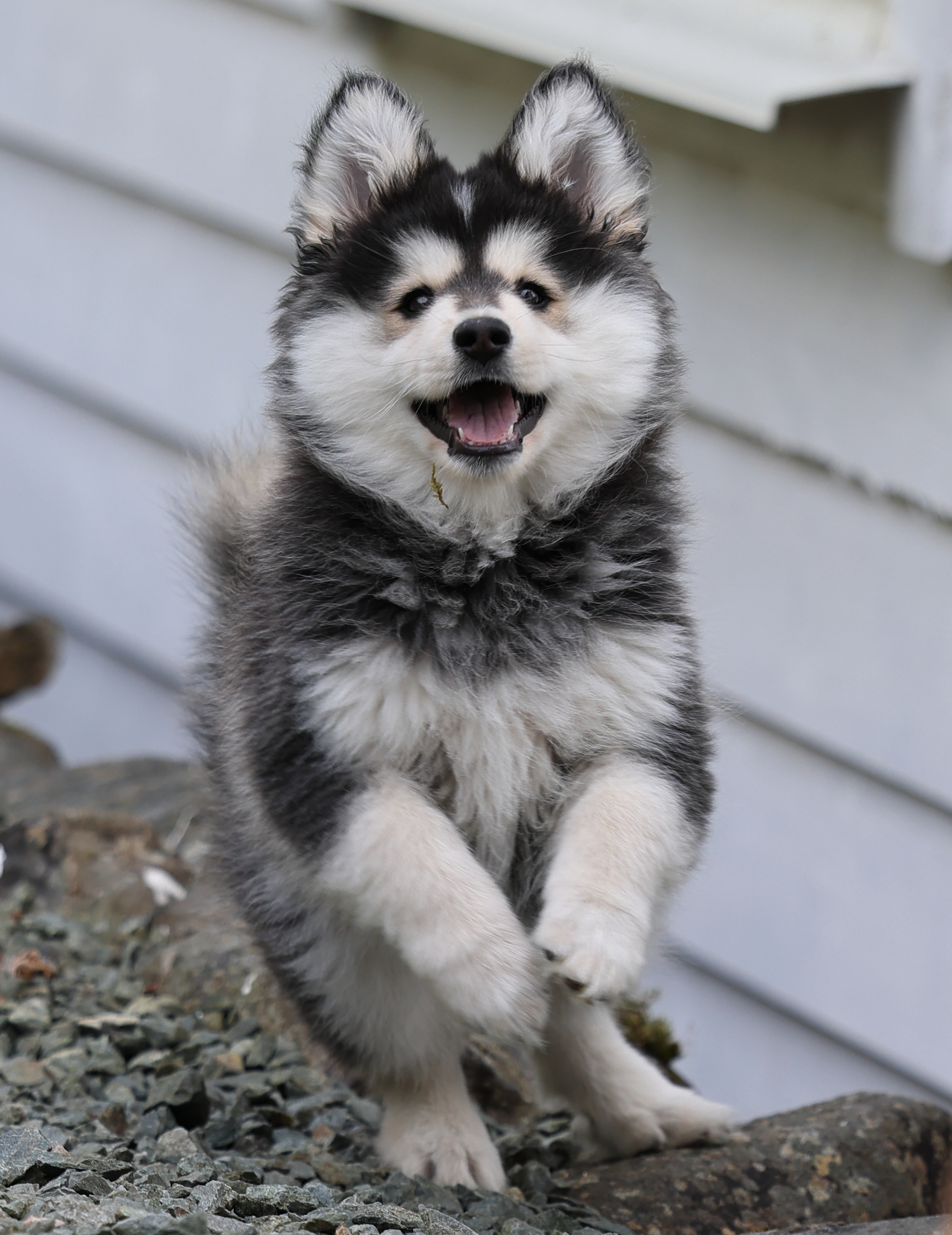
Puppy

The Finnish Lapphund is a medium-sized, strongly built dog. It has a profuse coat with pricked, highly mobile ears, distinctive markings and an elegant nose. Colours include black and cream, black and tan, white and grey, brown and white, brown and cream, as well as pure black, white and gray. The breed standard is 46 to 52 centimetres (18 to 20 in) at the withers for a male, and a slightly smaller 41 to 47 centimetres (16 to 19 in) for a female. However, some variation is allowed, since the breed standard states that the type is more important than the size. A typical male of 49 cm height normally weighs 17 to 19 kilograms (37 to 42 lb), but the breed has a weight range of 15 to 24 kilograms (33 to 53 lb), depending on the size of the dog.

The Lapphund has a profuse double coat, with a short, fluffy undercoat and a longer topcoat. The coat is water-resistant, as well as resistant to extreme cold. The profuse hair around the head and neck give the distinct impression of a mane in most males. Although the coat is thick, it requires only a modest amount of maintenance. Weekly brushing is recommended throughout the year, except during shedding seasons, where a daily brush may be required.

A wide variety of colours and markings are found in Finnish Lapphunds. Any colour is allowed in the breed standard, although a single colour should be dominant. One of the most common colour combinations is black and tan: a predominantly black dog with tan legs and face. Common colourations may include crème, black, red, brown, sable and wolf-sable. In descending order of dominance, the following genes in certain series correspond to specific colourations:

A series (Agouti):

- A^{y}: dominant yellow or sable (which produces various types of red and sable)
- a^{w}: wolf sable or grizzle
- a^{s}:saddle
- a^{t}: black and tan
- a: recessive black

B series (brown)

C series (colour):

- C: CC pairing displays deep rich tan
- C^{e}: not fully defined (potential lightening effect)
- c^{ch}: Chinchilla (lightens yellow to cream or fawn)

E series (extension)

- E^{m}: black mask
- E: no black mask
- E^{br}: brindle
- e: conversion/fading of black to yellow

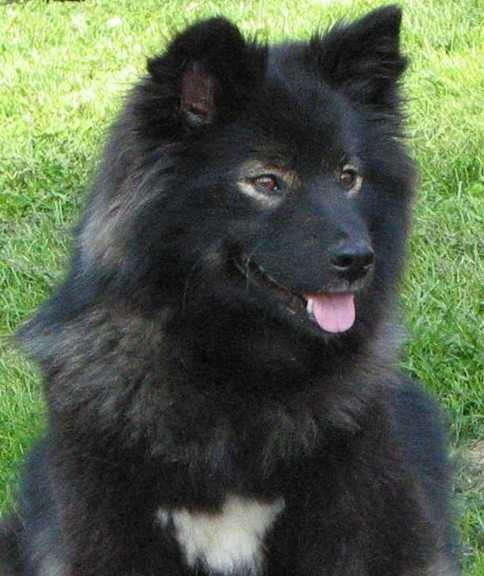
Predominantly black Finnish Lapphund female with spectacle markings around the eyes

Many Finnish Lapphunds have very distinctive facial markings, like "spectacles", where a ring of lighter-coloured hair around the eyes gives the impression that the dog is wearing spectacles. The spectacles of the Finnish Lapphund, while reminiscent of their cousins, the Keeshond, are larger and more pronounced. Like other spitz types, the tail is carried curving over the back. The Finnish Lapphund has a tail covered with thick, long hair. The tail may hang as the dog stands.

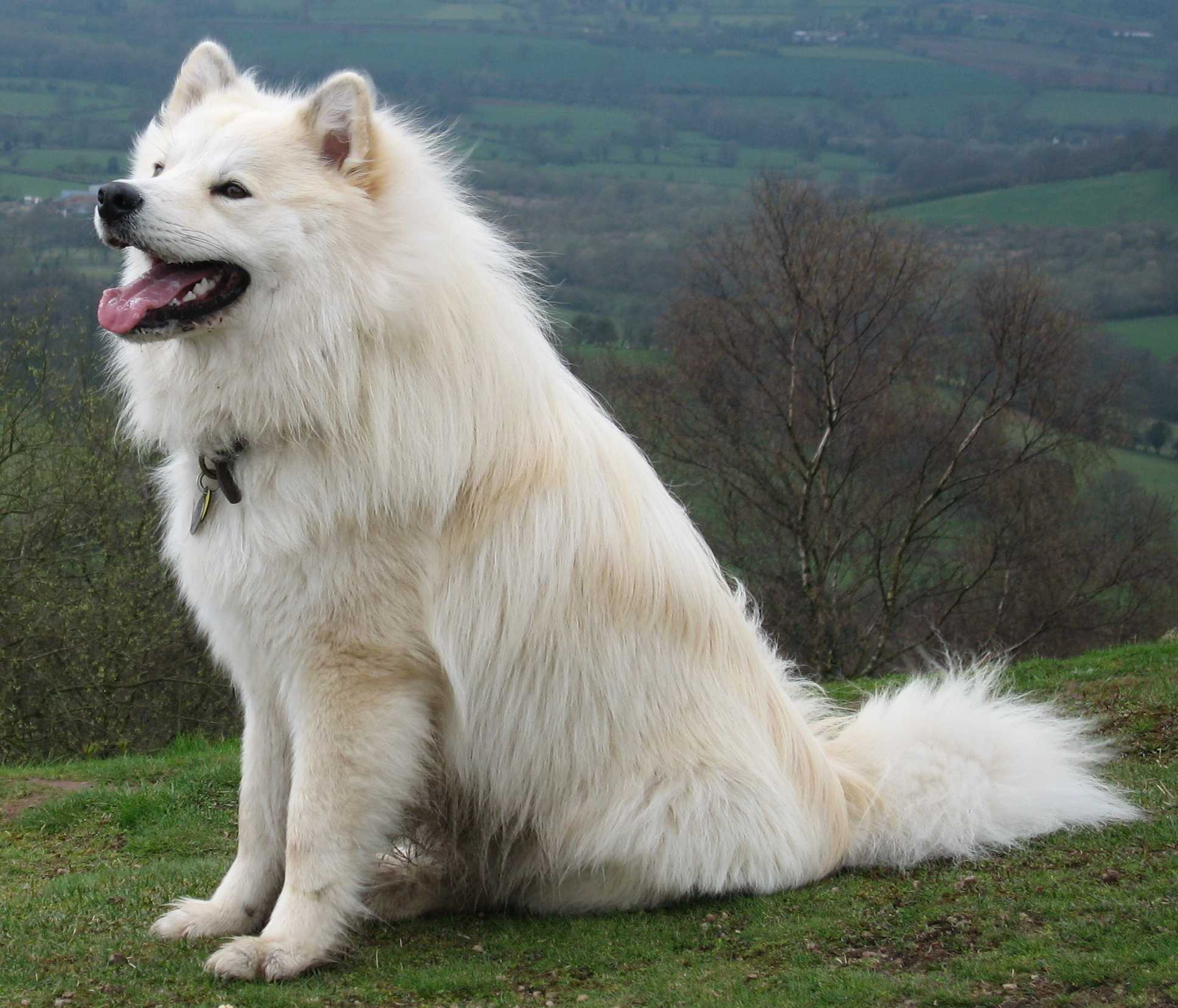
Cream sable Finnish Lapphund

The Finnish Lapphund is a recognized breed in Finland, the rest of Europe, Australia and the United States. The breed standards are mostly identical, with a few minor exceptions: in the English standard, the acceptance of tipped ears is omitted.

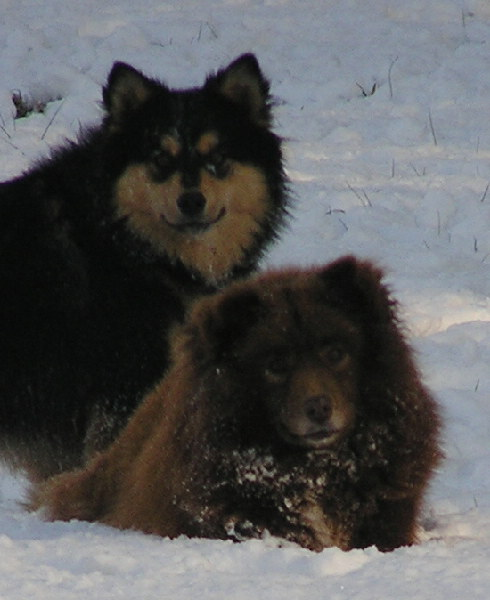
Finnish Lapphunds enjoying the snow

== Activities ==
The Finnish Lapphund can compete in dog agility trials, carting, mushing, obedience, Rally obedience, showmanship, flyball, tracking, and herding events. Herding instincts and trainability can be measured at non-competitive herding tests. Lapphunds exhibiting basic herding instincts can be trained to compete in herding trials.

== Health ==
GPRA is a progressive eye disease that can cause permanent blindness in dogs. In the Finnish Lapphund, this tends to be late onset, but can typically appear between the ages of 1 and 8 years. GPRA is a genetic illness, and is transmitted via an autosomal recessive gene. A reliable genetic test for the prcd-form of GRPA has been developed by OptiGen, and breeders are increasingly testing breeding animals before deciding on suitable mating pairs. The Finnish Lapphund club of Great Britain adopted an ethical policy in 2006 that matings will only be allowed if the progeny can not be affected by GPRA. In 2001, 2.5% dogs of Finnish dogs were affected by PRA.

Some Lapphunds are affected by cataracts, with 3.4% of Finnish dogs affected. Cataracts can be caused by a number of factors, and the mode of inheritance is not yet well understood. Since the incidence in Finland is relatively high, the disease is considered to be hereditary. In the UK and USA the number of affected dogs is very small.

Other diseases include epilepsy, hypothyroidism (underactive thyroid), degenerative myelopathy (DM) and Pompe disease (also known as glycogen storage disease type II, GSD II), which is a progressive disorder of glycogen metabolism.

== History ==
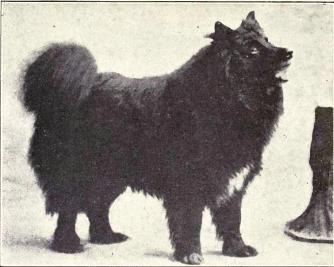
"Lapland Sheepdog" from Dogs of all Nations 1915

The breed has its origins as a reindeer herder of the Sami people. The Sami are an indigenous people residing in areas now divided between Finland, Sweden, Norway, and Russia. Traditionally, reindeer herding has been very important for the Sami people, and they are still involved in herding today. The Sami have used herding dogs for centuries, and these dogs were typically long in body, somewhat rectangular in shape, with long hair and a straight tail that would curl up over the back when the dog was moving. Finnish Lapphunds are the most similar to the long haired dogs developed by the Sami people in order to assist them with herding, often favoured as winter herders for the reindeer.

Norwegians and Swedes were among the first to consider standardizing the dogs of Lapland prior to World War II. In the post war years, the dogs of Lapland were at serious risk due to distemper outbreak. Swedish Lapphund breeders today believe that their breed, and other Lapphund breeds, were in serious danger of extinction. A standard for the related Swedish Lapphund was adopted in 1944 in FCI (Fédération Cynologique Internationale), and the Finnish Lapphund standard soon followed.

In Finland, the first breed standards were set in 1945 by the Finnish Kennel Club, who called the breed the Lappish Herder, also known as Kukonharjunlainen. It is believed that these dogs were the result of a cross between the Karelian Bear Dog and the reindeer dogs, and had short hair. In the 1950s the Finnish Kennel Association (the second major kennel association in Finland) created the first breed standard for the Lapponian herder. Acceptable colours for this breed were black, bear-brown and white.

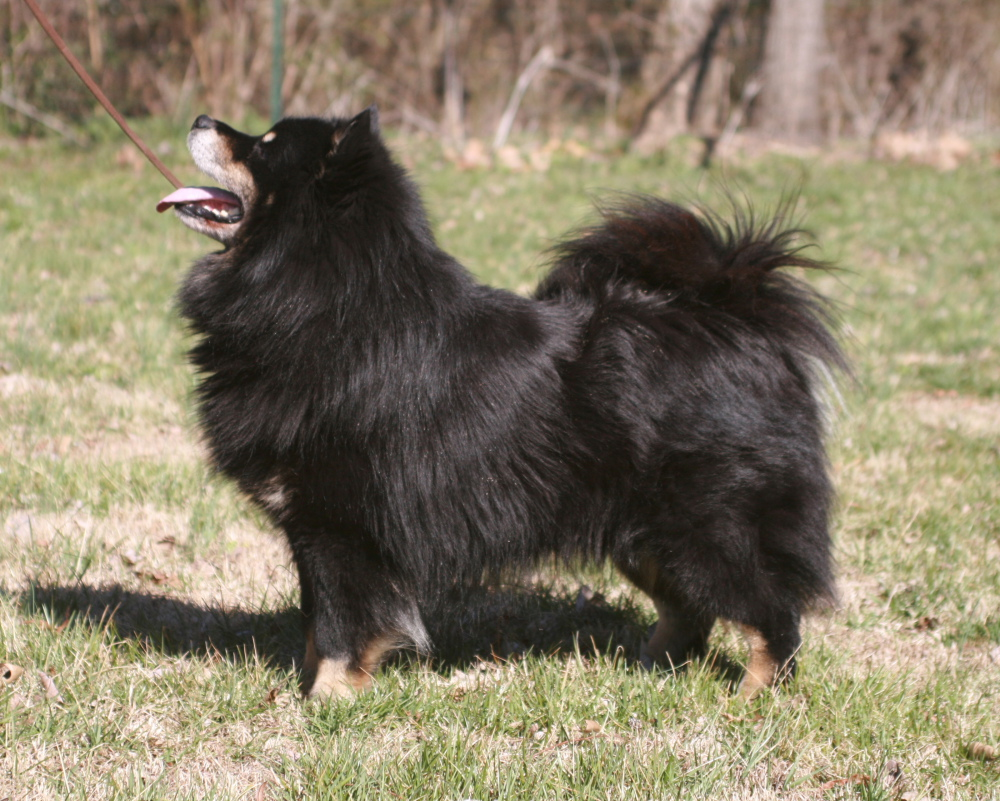
Finnish Lapphunds routinely participate in conformation events.

In the 1960s, the various Finnish kennel associations were unified, and in 1966 the breeds were reassessed. This resulted in the formal definition of two breeds: the Lapponian herder with a shorter coat was defined in 1966, and the longer coated Finnish Lapphund was defined in 1967.

At about the same time, technology enabled changes in the lifestyle of the Sami herders. Previously, the longer-haired dogs were generally preferred for herding, but with the advent of snowmobiles, the preference started to change in favour of the shorter haired Lapponian herder. However, popularity did not die for the longer-haired breed, which as of 2014 was ranked the sixth most popular companion animal in Finland.

The first American litter was born in 1988. In 1994, the breed was recognised by the United Kennel Club (UKC), the second largest kennel club in America, in the Northern Group. The breed was accepted into the AKC Miscellaneous Group on July 1, 2009, and became a fully recognized breed in the Herding Group on June 30, 2011. The Finnish Lapphund Club of America (FLCA) is the parent organization in the United States and was awarded parent club status on November 25, 2015, thus allowing it to hold licensed championship point events.

The breed was first introduced to the United Kingdom in 1989 and is represented by the Finnish Lapphund Club of Great Britain. It was introduced to Australia and Canada in 1995 and is accepted by the New Zealand Kennel Club and Canadian Kennel Club. In Canada, its parent club is the Finnish Lapphund Club of Canada.

== See also ==
- List of dog breeds
- Finnish Spitz
