= When the Cranes Fly South =

2024 debut novel by Lisa Ridzén

- First edition, in Swedish
- Author: Lisa Ridzén
- Original title: Tranorna flyger söderut
- Illustrator: Sara R. Acedo
- Subject: Old age
- Publisher: Bokförlaget Forum
- Publication date: 2024
- Publication place: Sweden
- Awards: Årets bok

When the Cranes Fly South (Swedish: Tranorna flyger söderut) is the 2024 debut novel by the Swedish author Lisa Ridzén. It follows an elderly man who attempts to mend his relationship with his son. It was translated into English by Alice Menzies. The book was the 2024 recipient of the Swedish Book of the Year award.

== Author ==
Lisa Ridzén was born on 4 March 1988. She grew up in the village of Hegled in rural Jämtland; both her parents were teachers. She studied gender studies and sociology at Umeå University, and is taking her PhD at Mid Sweden University. Tranorna flyger söderut is her first book.

== Plot ==
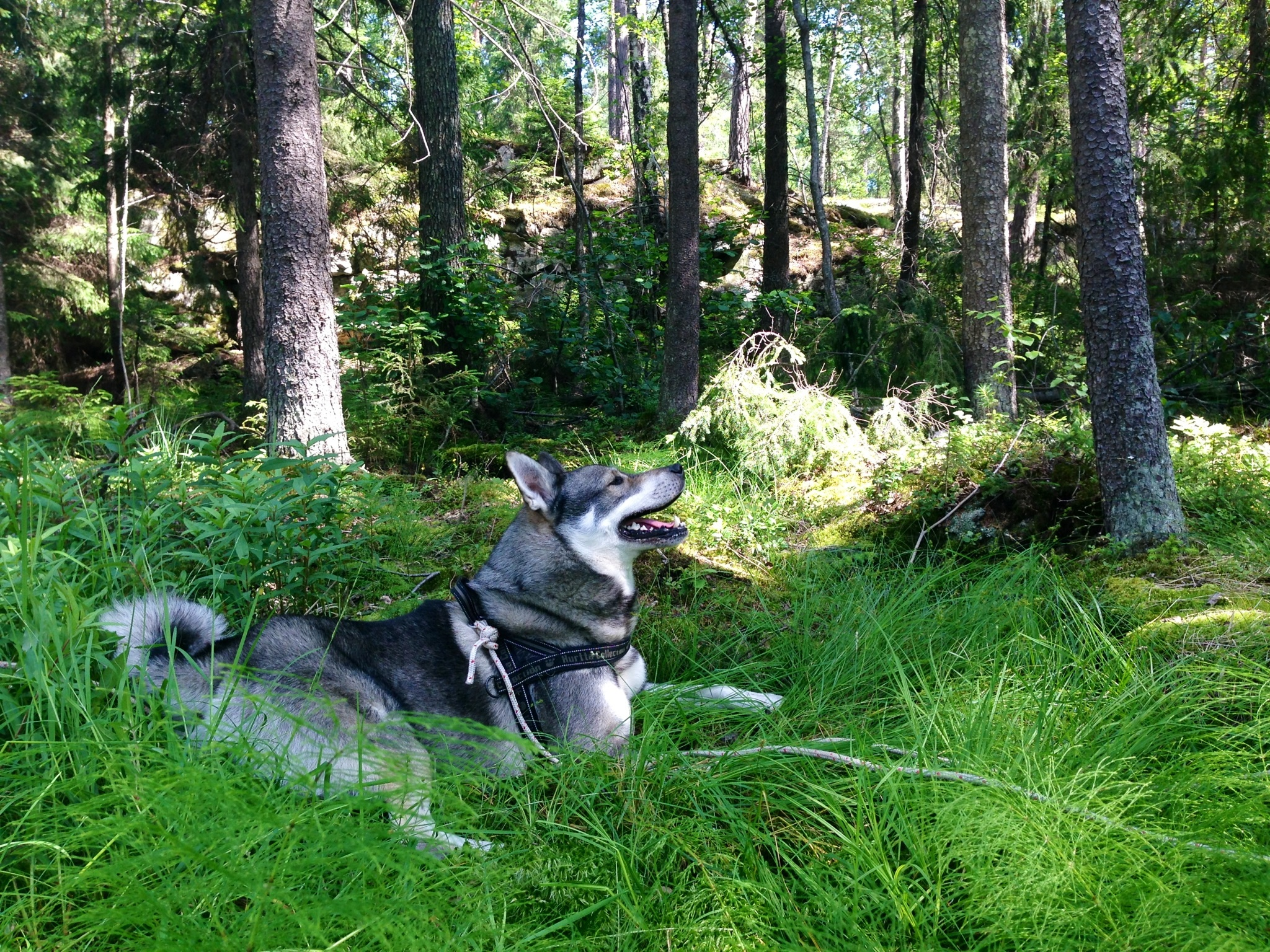
Canine companionship with his Jämthund is important to Bo, as he lives alone in a house in the Swedish countryside.

When the Cranes Fly South tells the tale of an 89-year-old man, Bo, nearing the end of his life. He worked for 50 years in a local sawmill and now lives alone with his Jämthund, Sixten, in rural Jämtland, some 550 kilometres north of Stockholm.

The book is divided into chapters for the days described, starting with "Thursday 18 May" and ending with "Tuesday 10 October—Friday 13 October"; not every day in between is covered. The chapters are often divided into sections, headed with the time of day and a brief log-book entry by one of Bo's carers from social services. Each section is narrated by Bo in the first person.

Bo's wife, Fredrika, is in a care home with dementia. His son, Hans, is worried about his safety and wants to take Sixten away in case Bo comes to harm on long walks in the woods. This causes Bo anguish as he realizes he is losing control of his own life, and he vows never to speak to Hans again. He is cared for at his home by a team from social services, who make short visits; several of the team, including Ingrid, whom he respects, went to school with Hans. Bo has one friend, Ture, whom he fumblingly calls at frequent intervals on his supposedly age-friendly mobile phone. Ture is thought to be gay by the other villagers, and accordingly treated with suspicion, but Bo finds him entertaining, and likes to hear of Ture's trips away from Jämtland, as far afield as Gothenburg and even abroad; Bo has never travelled.

After Bo falls in the woods while taking Sixten for a long walk, Hans finally manages to take Sixten away. Alone but for visits, and as his health fails, Bo reflects on his life. Hans takes him to Ture's funeral; there, he meets a smartly-dressed man who has flown in from Gothenburg; Bo realises he must have been Ture's lover. Gradually Bo comes to terms with Hans, and at the end manages to tell him that he is proud of him. In his dying moments, someone opens a window and he hears the cranes getting ready to fly south for the winter.

== Publication ==
Tranorna flyger söderut was first published in paperback by Forum in 2024. The book has no illustrations except the front cover, which was designed by Sara R. Acedo. The book became a bestseller in Sweden with 165,000 copies sold by February 2025, and has been translated into at least 34 languages. An English translation by Alice Menzies was published as a paperback by Doubleday in London, and by Vintage Books in New York, in 2025.

== Reception ==
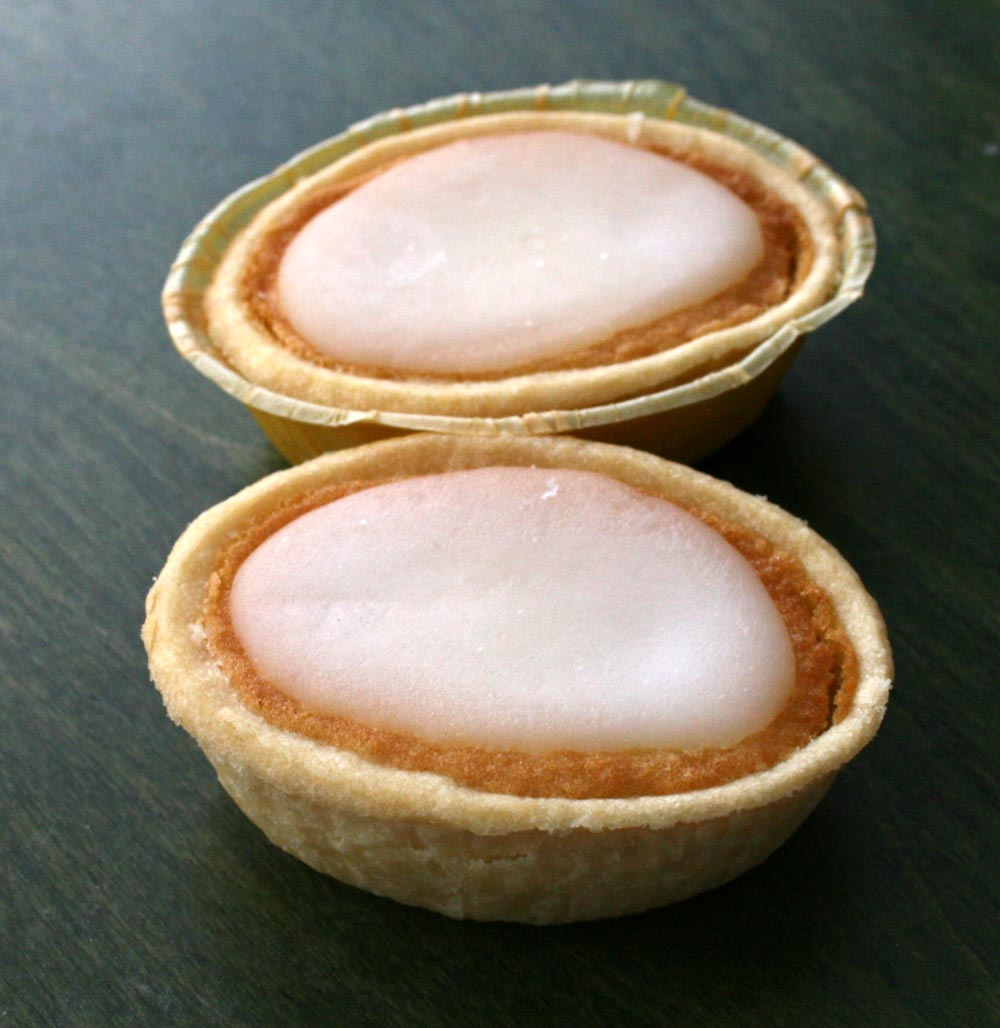
Mazarins, Swedish glazed almond tarts

Patrick Gale, reviewing the book for The Guardian, wrote that it shows "how sometimes the simplest storytelling can be the most effective." He comments that Ridzén skilfully evokes a sense of place, and the Swedish food, as Bo compares the "tinned fishballs and microwaved stew served by the carers" to his wife's clearly much better versions, and Ture's almond tarts, mazarins.

Bonniers bookclub marketing manager Petra Nuhma, announcing that it had won the organisation's Årets bok prize, that Tranorna flyger söderut was "a captivating debut that awakens strong feelings". The national newspaper Expressen wrote that the book had made Swedish readers "cry floods of tears".

== Awards ==
The book won the 2024 Årets bok (Sweden's Book of the Year) prize.

== Film adaptation ==
In November 2025, it was reported that a film adaptation would be in development at B-Reel Films.

== Sources ==
- Ridzén, Lisa (2024). Tranorna flyger söderut [When the Cranes Fly South] (in Swedish). Stockholm: Bokförlaget Forum. ISBN 978-91-37-16122-8.
