= Llewelyn Lloyd =

Llewelyn Lloyd may refer to:

- Llewelyn Lloyd (painter) (1879–1949), Italian-born British-Italian Divisionist painter
- Llewelyn Lloyd (naturalist) (1792–1876), British writer in Sweden

== See also ==
- Lloyd Llewellyn, a comic book by Daniel Clowes
- Llewellyn Lloyd
