= Jämthund =

Dog breed

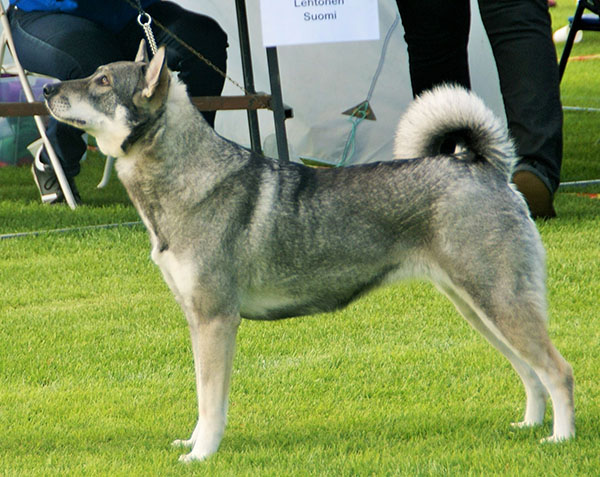
- Other names: Swedish Elkhound; Jämptlanninpystykorva
- Origin: Sweden
Traits
Height	Males	57–65 cm (22–26 in)
	Females	52–60 cm (20–24 in)
- Coat: Long, hard and close lying double coat
- Colour: Grey with light grey or cream muzzle, underside and legs
Kennel club standards
- Svenska Kennelklubben: standard
- Fédération Cynologique Internationale: standard

The Jämthund, also called the Swedish Elkhound, is a breed of dog of the Spitz type that is found in Northern Europe. The Jämthund is eponymous with Jämtland, a province in the middle of Sweden.

== History ==
The Jämthund is one of a number of breeds of spitz-type hunting dogs that have been known throughout Scandinavia for centuries. Historically these dogs have been used to hunt a wide variety of game including bear, elk, wolf and lynx.

The Jämthund received official recognition as a breed in 1946, due to intensive work by Aksel Lindström and others. Before that, both it and the Norwegian Elkhound were seen as the same breed. They are both used for hunting large game, such as moose and bear.

=== Lineage ===
The breed falls under the mitochondrial DNA sub-clade referred to as d1 that is only found in northern Scandinavia. It is the result of a male dog-female wolf hybridization that occurred post-domestication. Subclade d1 that is thought to have originated "no more than 480–3,000 years ago" and it includes all Sámi-related breeds: Finnish Lapphund, Swedish Lapphund, Lapponian Herder, Swedish Elkhound, Norwegian Elkhound, Black Norwegian Elkhound and Hällefors Elkhound. The maternal wolf sequence that contributed to these breeds has not been matched across Eurasia.

== Description ==
=== Appearance ===
The dog should have a loosely curled tail that hangs on the back and is not too thin or too tightly curled; when relaxed the tail should hang straight down. This breed has erect ears with a wide space in between them, a medium to long muzzle, and a double coat of various shades of agouti. The eyes are brown. The size of the male is usually 57–65 centimetres (22–26 in), weighing 30–35 kilograms (66–77 lb). Females are usually between 52–60 centimetres (20–24 in), weighing 25–30 kilograms (55–66 lb).

The Jämthund should be distinguished from the Norwegian Elkhound. The Norwegian Elkhound is much shorter and stockier than the Jämthund, and its tail shape is very different. It also has a black mask on the muzzle, whereas the Jämthund has a white muzzle, white cheeks and typical wolf markings.

=== Temperament ===
Although calm and affectionate with its family, the Jämthund can be dominant with other dogs and has a strong prey drive. A truly all-around canine, it can go from a hunting trip and back to the family hearth with great aplomb. It takes things in stride and does not get ruffled easily, making it a steady partner in the field or at home.

The Jämthund is a happy learner who loves to please its owner.

== See also ==
- List of dog breeds
