= Swedish Lapphund =

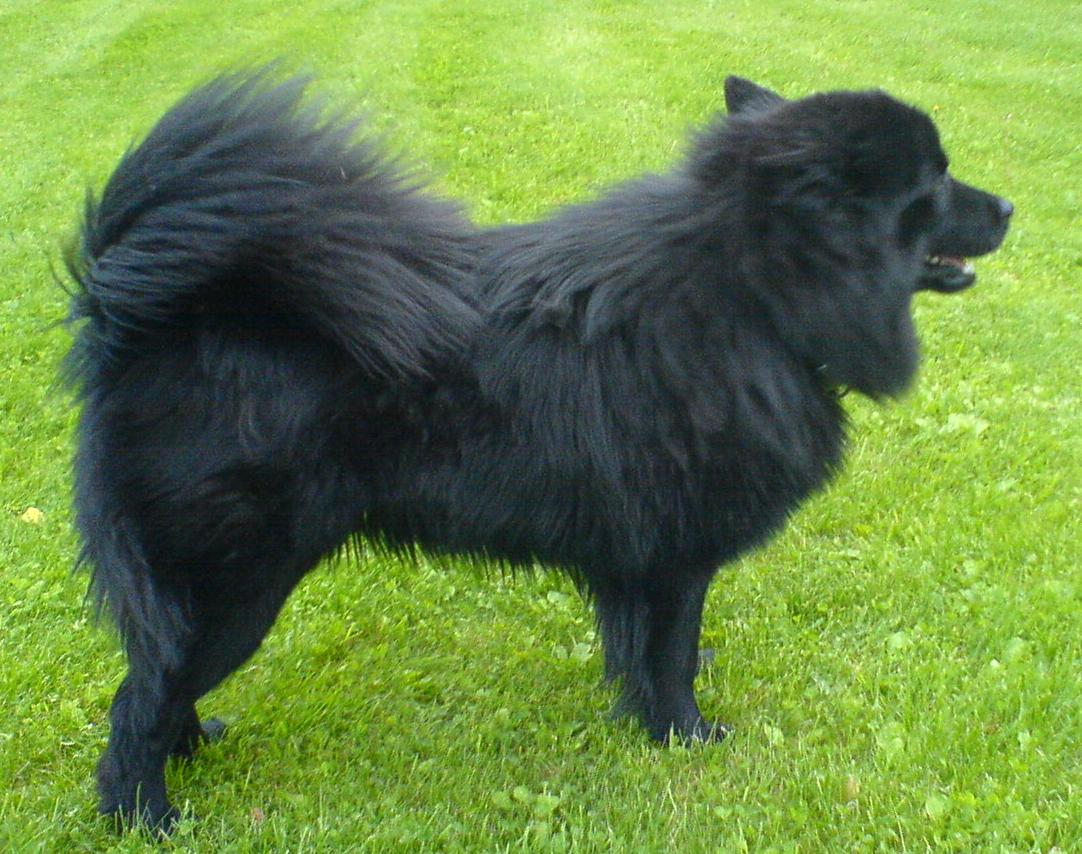
- Other names: Svensk Lapphund
- Origin: Sweden
Traits
Height	Males	45–51 cm (18–20 in)
	Females	40–46 cm (16–18 in)
- Weight: 19–21 kg (42–46 lb)
- Coat: double coat
- Colour: solid black or black with bronze or white markings
Kennel club standards
- Fédération Cynologique Internationale: standard

The Swedish Lapphund (Swedish: Svensk lapphund) is a breed of dog of the Spitz type from Sweden, one of three Lapphund breeds developed from a type of dog used by the Sami people for herding and guarding their reindeer. The expression "the black beauty of Norrland" is very often attributed to the Swedish lapphund, which is most likely one of Sweden's oldest breeds.

== Lineage ==
The breed falls under the mitochondrial DNA sub-clade referred to as d1 that is only found in northern Scandinavia. It is the result of a female wolf-male dog hybridization that occurred post-domestication. Subclade d1 originated "at most 480–3,000 years ago" and is found in all Sami-related breeds: Finnish Lapphund, Swedish Lapphund, Lapponian Herder, Jamthund, Norwegian Elkhound and Hällefors Elkhound. The maternal wolf sequence that contributed to these breeds has not been matched across Eurasia.

== Appearance ==
The Swedish Lapphund is a slightly less than medium-sized breed of spitz-type dog. Dogs stand from 45–51 centimetres (18–20 in) and bitches stand from 40–46 centimetres (16–18 in). Healthy adults can weigh anywhere from 19–21 kilograms (42–46 lb) according to the breed standard.

The Swedish Lapphund has a profuse, weather resistant double coat with a dense undercoat. They usually come in solid black, but may also have bronze or white markings.

== Temperament ==
Like all spitz dogs in general, the Swedish Lapphund demands a stable upbringing and both regular mental and physical stimulation to perform at its best. As a working dog they show their versatility in a number of different fields. Many compete with success in such widely different disciplines as obedience, dog agility trials, working contest, freestyle/heelwork to music, Rally obedience, and blood tracking. The Swedish Lapphund can also participate in herding events. Herding instincts and trainability can be measured at noncompetitive herding tests. Lapphunds exhibiting basic herding instincts can be trained to compete in herding trials.

== See also ==
- List of dog breeds
- Finnish Lapphund
- Lapponian Herder
