= Norwegian Elkhound =

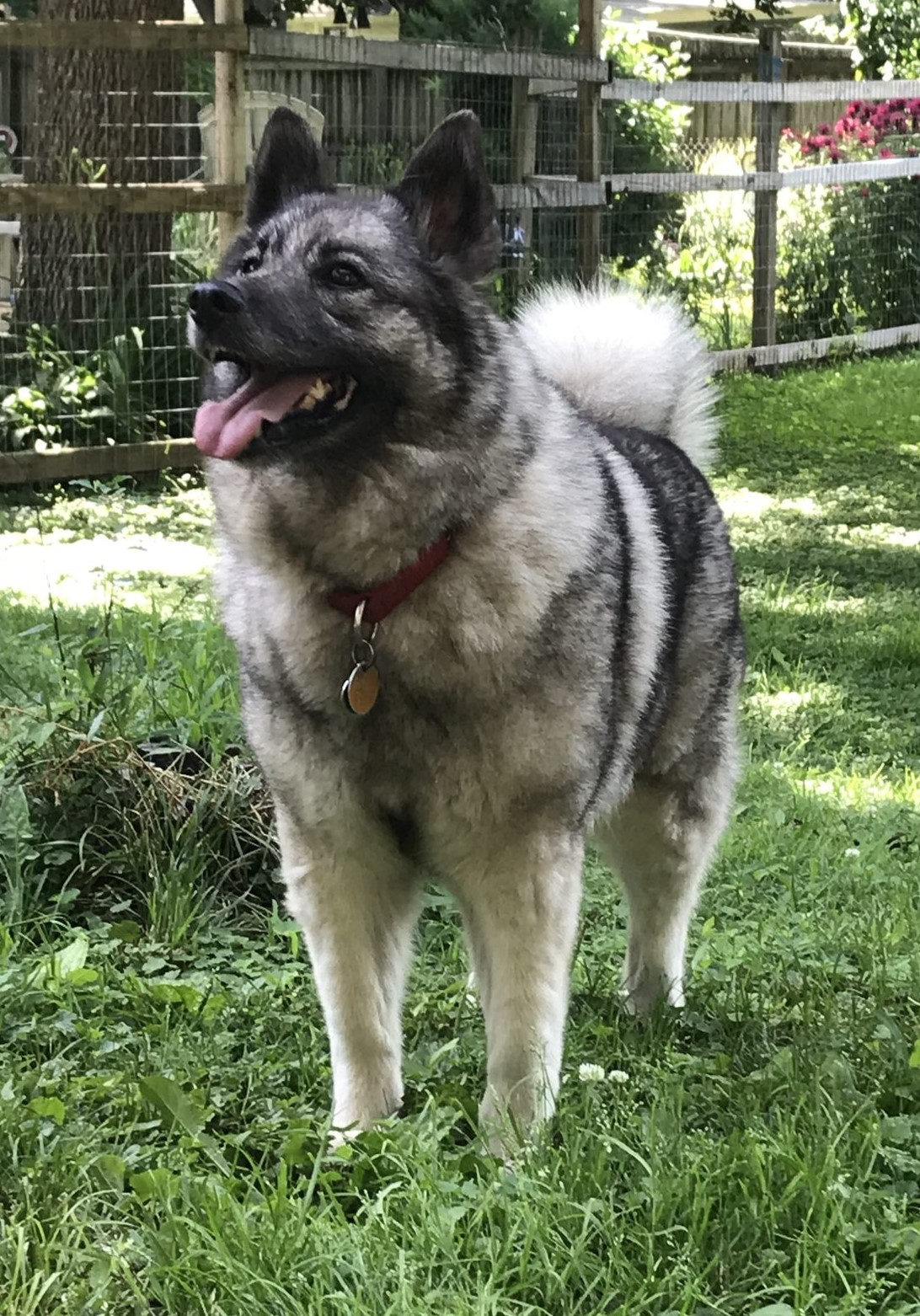
- A female Norwegian Elkhound, showing the standard tightly curled tail
- Other names: Norsk elghund grå Grå norsk elghund Gray Norwegian Elkhound gråhund Norwegian Moose Dog; Harmaa norjanhirvikoira
- Origin: Norway
Kennel club standards
- Fédération Cynologique Internationale: standard
- Notes: The FCI divides this into two breeds, Grey (242) and Black (268).

The Norwegian Elkhound is one of the Northern Spitz-type breeds of dog and is the National Dog of Norway. The Elkhound has served as a hunter, guardian, herder, and defender. It is known for its courage in tracking and hunting elk and other large game, such as bears or wolves. The Norwegian Elkhound was first presented at a dog exhibition in Norway in 1877.

The Norwegian name of the breed is Norsk elghund grå. The breed's object in the hunt is to independently track down and hold the elk at bay—jumping in and out toward the elk, distracting its attention, while signaling to the hunters by barking very loudly—until the hunter who follows the sound can arrive to shoot it. The dog will only bark while the elk is stationary, but it can also slowly drive the elk towards shooters lying in wait. The Norwegian Elkhound is also used on a leash. In this mode of hunting, the dog leads the hunter in the direction of the elk while keeping quiet.

== Lineage ==
The breed falls under the mitochondrial DNA sub-clade referred to as d1 that is only found in northern Scandinavia. It is the result of a female wolf-male dog hybridization that occurred post-domestication. Subclade d1 originated "at most 480–3,000 years ago" and includes all Sami-related breeds: Finnish Lapphund, Swedish Lapphund, Lapponian Herder, Jämthund, Norwegian Elkhound and Hällefors Elkhound. The maternal wolf sequence that contributed to these breeds has not been matched across Eurasia.

== Description ==
=== Appearance ===
Norwegian Elkhound appearance
Build:	medium, sturdy and squarely built
Weight:	44–51 lbs (20–23 kg)
Height:	19.5–20.5 inches (50–52 cm)
Coat:	Coarse, straight, with soft undercoat
Color:	Black and white coloring, often noted as grey or silver
Head:	Broad and wedge-shaped with a defined stop
Teeth:	Scissors bite
Eyes:	Dark brown with a keen, friendly expression
Ears:	Pointed, erect
Tail:	Rolled tightly over back
Limbs:	Straight and parallel

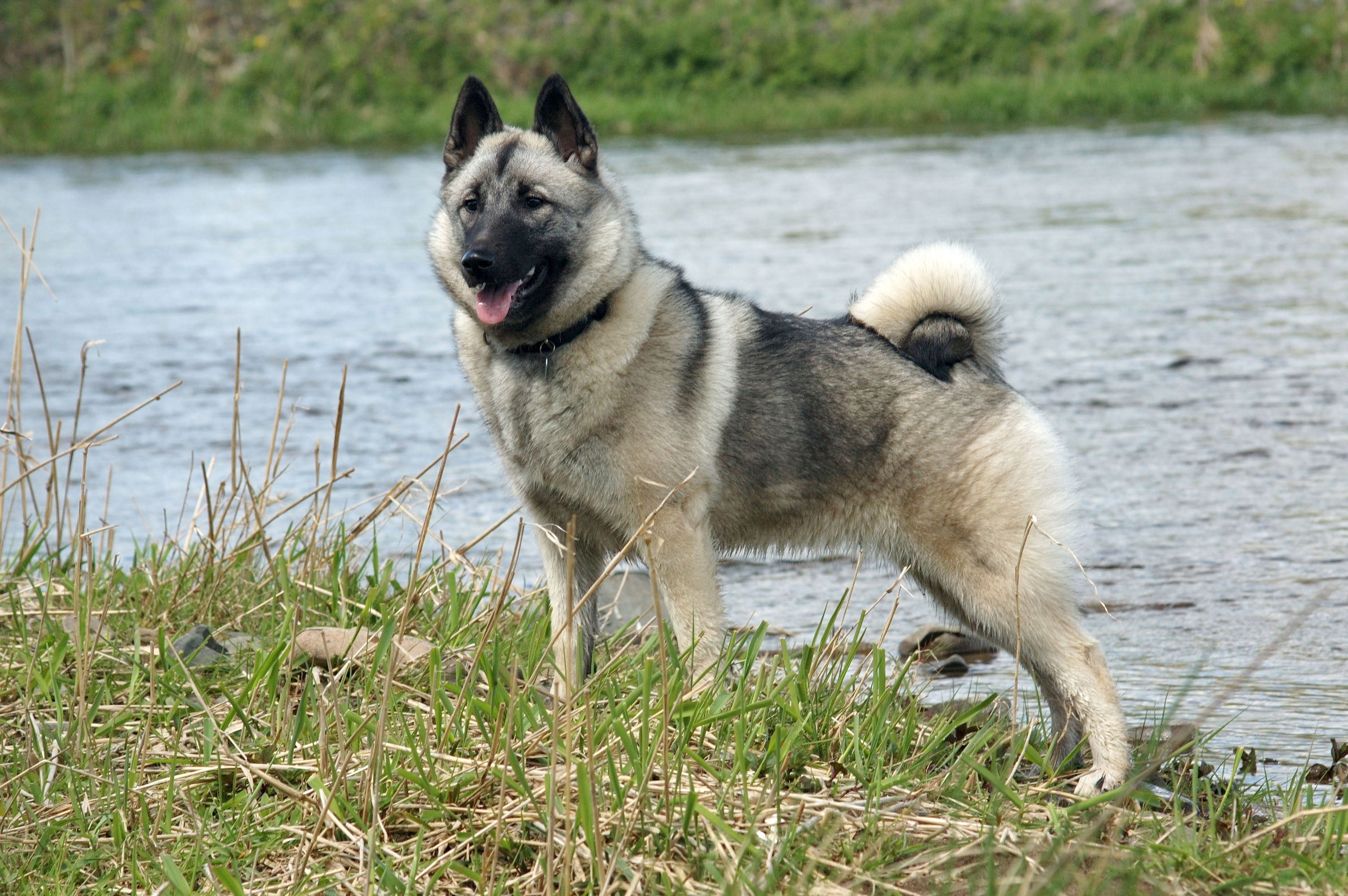
Norwegian Elkhound

According to The Kennel Club breed standard ideally the dog stands about 19.5–20.5 inches (50–52 cm) high and weighs up to 23 kilograms (51 lb). Its grey, white, and black coat is made up of two layers: an underlying dense smooth coat ranging from black at the muzzle, ears, and tip of its tail to silvery grey on its legs, tail, and underbody and an overlying black-tipped protective guard coat. An ideal Elkhound has a tightly curled tail. The Elkhound is a medium-sized dog and extremely hardy.

=== Temperament ===
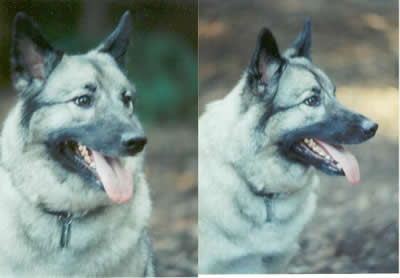
Adult Norwegian Elkhound displaying characteristic friendly expression

Norwegian Elkhounds are bred for hunting large game, such as wolf, bear and elk. Although the breed is strong and hardy, the dogs typically have an inseparable bond with their masters and are quite loyal. All Elkhounds have a sharp loud bark which makes them suitable as watchdogs.

Norwegian Elkhounds are loyal to their "pack" and make excellent family dogs given proper attention. They are bold, playful, independent, alert, extremely intelligent, and, at times, a bit boisterous. They rank 36th in Stanley Coren's The Intelligence of Dogs, being of above average working/obedience intelligence.

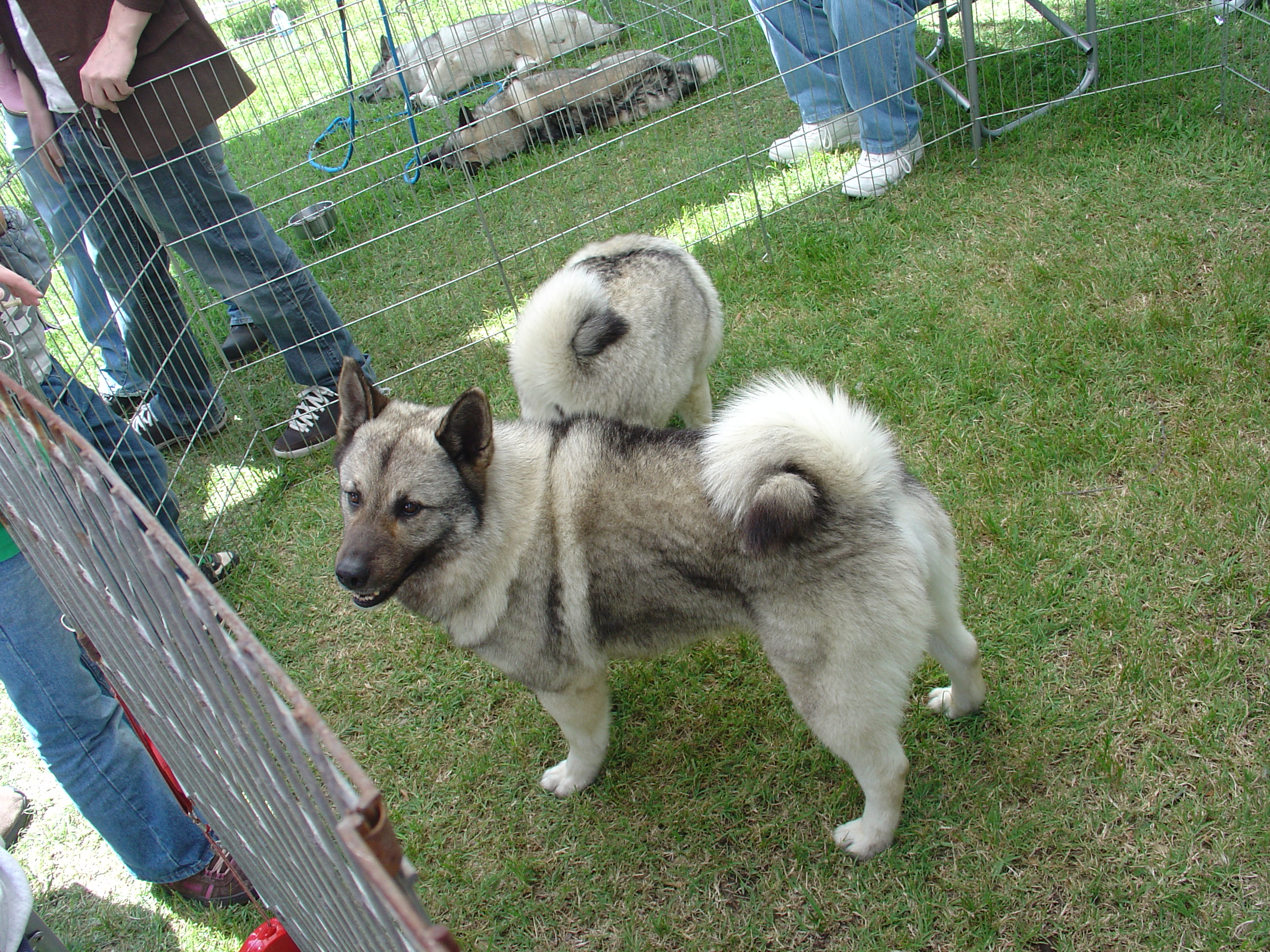
A Norwegian Elkhound being shown off at the Scandinavian Festival hosted by California Lutheran University in Thousand Oaks, California

== Health ==
A 2024 UK study found a life expectancy of 12.9 years for the breed compared to an average of 12.7 for purebreeds and 12 for crossbreeds.

Norwegian Elkhounds are prone to an inherited abnormality that causes primary renal glucosuria via reducing the functional capacity of the tubular epithelial cells to reabsorb glucose; this disorder further predisposes them to lower urinary tract bacterial infections.

Norwegian Elkhounds are also predisposed to dioestrous & gestational diabetes, progesterone-related forms of diabetes mellitus.

A form of inherited chondrodysplasia has been described in the Norwegian Elkhound since the 1980s. Symptoms include curvature of the forelimbs, carpal valgus, retarded ossification, and a shortening of the vertebral body. Researchers from Finland identified the cause to be a recessive nonsense mutation in the ITGA10 gene.

The Norwegian Elkhound is one of the more commonly affected breeds for primary open angle glaucoma. An autosomal recessive mutation in the ADAMTS10 gene is responsible for the condition in the breed.

== History ==
The breed is popular in Sweden where it has always been highly prized as a hunting dog. It is 98% genetically identical to the Jämthund. It was rarely seen or bred outside of Norway until its appearance in England in the 19th century. It was officially recognized by The Kennel Club in 1901.

== Famous Norwegian Elkhounds ==
- President Herbert Hoover's "Weegie"

== See also ==
- List of dog breeds
- Tahltan Bear Dog (extinct)
- Norwegian Lundehund
- Old Norwegian sheep
- Icelandic goat
- Norwegian sheep landrace
- Norwegian chicken landrace
- Norwegian forest cat
- Black Norwegian Elkhound
