= Llewelyn Lloyd (naturalist) =

E. H. Llewelyn Lloyd (27 July 1792 – 17 February 1876), also published as Lewis Lloyd, was a Welsh amateur naturalist who lived for more than two decades in Sweden.

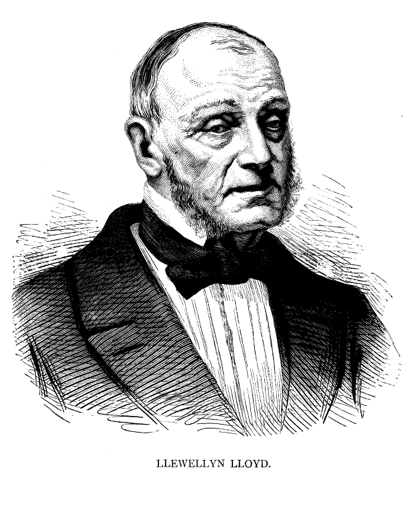
Llewellyn Lloyd Portrait

Lloyd first wrote Field Sports of the North of Europe: Comprised in a Personal Narrative of a Residence in Sweden and Norway, in the Years 1827–28 then other diaries and notes. He wrote mainly on Scandinavia's local customs, peasant life, and on nature - particularly ornithology and on the black wolf and wolf hunting.

== Works ==
- LLoyd, L (1830). Field Sports of the North of Europe: Comprised in a Personal Narrative of a Residence in Sweden and Norway, in the Years 1827–28. H. Colburn & R. Bentley.
- Lloyd, L (1867). The game birds and wild fowl of Sweden and Norway. London: F. Warne and co.
- LLoyd, L (1854). Scandinavian adventures, during a residence of upwards of twenty years. London: R. Bentley.
- Lloyd, L (1870). Peasant Life in Sweden. London: Tinsley Brothers.
