= Svenska Kennelklubben =

- Formation: 13 December 1889
- Type: Kennel club
- Region served: Sweden
- Website: www.skk.se

Svenska Kennelklubben (SKK, English: Swedish Kennel Club) is a Swedish organization dedicated to purebred dogs, and dog owners. It was formed on 13 December 1889 by a group of noblemen and hunters with the aim to maintain the capability of good hunting dogs. According to its charter, the goals of the organization are "to create interest in, and promote, the breeding of mentally and physically healthy purebred dogs that are adequate in terms of working and hunting and that have a favorable appearance".

== Overview ==
Today, the majority of SKK's over 300 000 members are ordinary dog owners. Many breeders (about 15 000), hunters and people who work with dogs in various ways are also members of SKK. Out of the 780,000 dogs that live in Sweden, approximately 70% of dogs are currently registered with the SKK. The foundation of SKK's organization is the county clubs, specialty clubs and breed clubs located around the country. They conduct a wide range of activities and arrange many different exhibitions and competitions.

SKK's office is located in Stockholm and has 75 employees who handle the administration of the organization and provide support and advice to members. The club is divided into 25 county clubs, each responsible for membership care in its own county. SKK handles the breed registry for about 70% of the canines in Sweden.

SKK is a member of Fédération Cynologique Internationale (FCI).

== Breeding ==
Strategies promoted by the SKK include guidelines for genetic conditions, behavior traits, and show quality. As a tool for breeders and kennel clubs to produce dogs with favourable behaviour, the SKK has developed the Behaviour and Personality Assessment in Dogs, an assessment that measures behavioural traits in dogs. As part of their commitment, the "SKK central office in Stockholm has a Department for Breeding and Health employing eight persons, including two fulltime breeding consultants, a veterinarian, and a geneticist."

== See also ==
- Swedish Lapphund
