= Suomen Kennelliitto =

Finnish dog association

Suomen Kennelliitto - Finska Kennelklubben ry. (SKL-FKK) is a Finnish kennel club and a member of the Fédération Cynologique Internationale, an international federation of kennel clubs. It is known in English as the Finnish Kennel Club.

Founded in 1889, Suomen Kennelliitto is the oldest dog association in Scandinavia. It has more than 120,000 members and serves as a head organization for approximately 1,700 hobby and hunting clubs. It also publishes Koiramme (Our Dogs) magazine, and registers all purebred dogs in Finland.
