= Rally obedience =

Dog sport

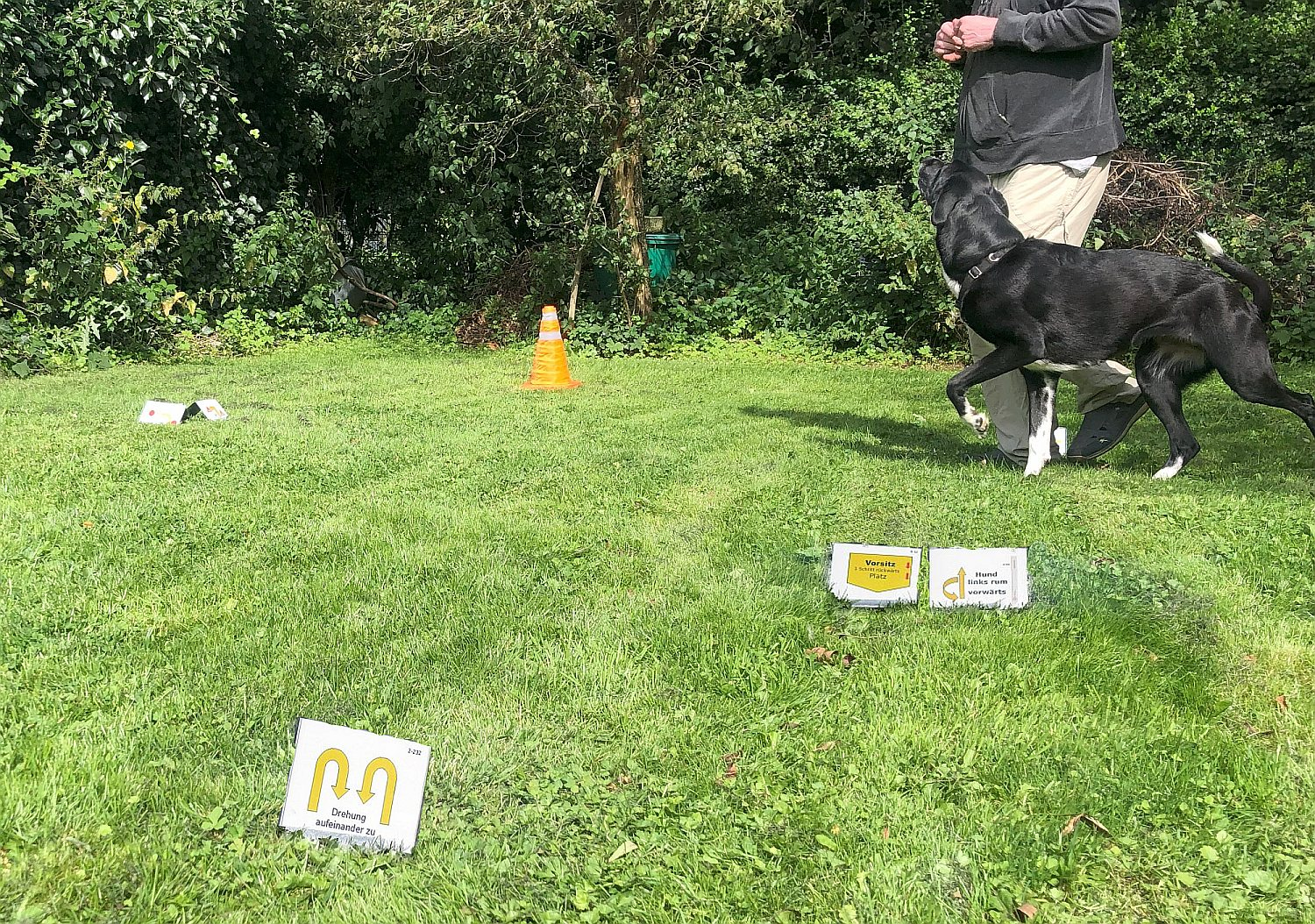
A dog and owner at a Rally competition

Rally obedience (also known as Rally or Rally-O) is a dog sport based on obedience. It was originally devised by Charles L. "Bud" Kramer from the obedience practice of "doodling"—doing a variety of interesting warmup and freestyle exercises. The doodles were usually parts of obedience exercises that taught the skills and improved performance and accuracy.

Unlike regular obedience, instead of waiting for the judge's orders, the competitors proceed around a course of designated stations with the dog in heel position. The course consists of 10 to 20 signs that instruct the team what to do. Unlike traditional obedience, handlers are allowed to encourage their dogs during the course.

There are currently seven sanctioning bodies for Rally-O in the United States: the American Kennel Club (AKC); World Cynosport Rally Limited (formerly the Association of Pet Dog Trainers (APDT)); Canine Work and Games (C-Wags;) and Canines and Humans United (CHU). The United Kennel Club (UKC) added rally obedience to their program as of January 2009, and the Swedish Working Dog Club (SBK) added it in July 2011. International Canine Events (ICE) offers a Rallye Challenge title. Australian Shepherd Club of America (ASCA) also has a rally program that is available to all breeds, including mixed breeds.

== AKC Rally ==
In AKC Rally, which is open to AKC breeds and mixed breed dogs registered in the AKC Canine Partners program, the team starts with 100 points, and the judge deducts points for mistakes. Examples of errors include the dog leaving heel position when not cued to do so, the handler holding the leash too tightly, or miscounting steps on certain exercises.

After qualifying three times under at least two different judges, the dog earns a title, which appears after the dog's registered name. Each qualifying trial earned is known as a "leg".

There are five levels in AKC Rally:

- Novice, the beginner's class. The dog is on leash and there are 10 to 15 stations. The title is RN.
- Intermediate, an optional title for dogs who have completed their novice title but have not yet completed their advanced title. The dog is on leash and there are 12 to 17 stations of signs from the Novice and Advanced levels. The title is RI.
- Advanced, for dogs who have completed their novice title. Dogs are judged off leash. The title is RA.
- Excellent, for dogs who have earned their advanced title. 15 to 20 stations, including 2 jumps, are used in this class. The title is RE.
- Master, the highest class, for dogs who have earned their excellent title, the title is RM, however this title requires 10 qualifying scores.

There are three higher titles. There is the Rally Advanced Excellent (RAE) title, in which the team has to qualify in both Advanced and Excellent in 10 trials. The highest title for most competitors is the Rally Championship title (RACH), in which the team has to qualify in Advanced, Excellent, and Master in the same trial at least 20 separate times and that earn the required championship points. Dogs and their handlers who meet the required qualifications have a chance to compete at the yearly Rally National Championship for the Rally National Champion (RNC) prefix title.

== World Cynosport Rally Limited (WCRL) ==
World Cynosport Rally Limited (WCRL) was organized in 2012 when the United States Dog Agility Association, Inc. (USDAA) acquired the Rally Obedience program from the Association of Pet Dog Trainers (APDT). WCRL is still operated by USDAA, although WCRL programs exist in several countries including the United States, Puerto Rico, Canada, Japan, Mexico, Bermuda and Southeast Asia.

WCRL Rally is open to any breed of dog including mixed breeds. Given a base score of 200 points, the judge deducts points for errors and adds up to 10 points for optional bonus exercises. The minimum passing score is 170 and the maximum possible score is 210. Teams may earn level titles by qualifying three times under at least two different judges. Beyond the basic level titles, additional titles are available for continued qualification, as well as and several championship titles.

WCRL has two primary rally programs: regular and Flash. Flash rally differs from regular rally in that Flash includes no sits, downs, or jumps. In regular classes, there are five levels: Intro, Level 1, Level 2, Level 3, and Veteran. In Flash rally, there are three levels: Level 1, Level 2, and Level 3.

The most obvious difference between AKC rally and WCRL rally is that WCRL allows handlers to carry food into the ring and to reward their dog at specific points on the course. Other differences include exercise performance requirements, course time limits in WCRL and the fact that WCRL allows intact mixed breeds to compete.

== Other sanctioning bodies ==
UKC Rally follows a similar pattern as the AKC program. There are three levels of competition, three legs are required for a title, and there is an extended championship title. UKC rally is open to any dog and handler. The exercises in UKC rally vary slightly from the other organizations, mostly involving which exercises are in each level.

C-Wags and CHU are relatively new organizations that appear to be mainly in the Mid-west. It has added variations on rally courses, such as Zoom - which has no stationary signs, and requires 4 legs to title.

Canada has, in addition to WCRL, the Canadian Association of Rally Obedience (CARO) and Canadian Kennel Club (CKC) Rally. CARO is similar in many respects to both AKC and World Cynosport Rally, with the addition of some agility elements. CKC Rally began in early 2007 and is similar to AKC Rally.

In the UK, Talking Dogs Rally (TD Rally) produced their own version which was launched in January 2010. For greater clarity, all signs have been redesigned and colour-coded: Level 1 = green, Level 2 = blue and Level 3 = yellow. Uniquely, to encourage teams (one dog and one handler) to compete against their own scores rather than against other teams, TD Rally does not designate competitors as first, second or third. Instead, teams gain Good, Outstanding and Ace rosettes for achieving scores over 170, 180 and 190 respectively (all teams start with 200 points.) Teams scoring over 181 points are included in the UK TD Rally National Rankings. As with other versions there are multiple opportunities for teams to win Titles including Puppy and Veteran. TD Rally put great emphasis on training their Judges in order to provide competitors with standardised, objective and fair judging throughout the UK.

In Italy, CSEN "Rally-Obedience" produced their version which was launched in September 2010. In CSEN Rally-Obedience, which is open to any dog and handler, the team starts with 200 points, and the judge deducts points for mistakes. There are three levels and there are additional titles for multiple qualifications at various levels. Another there are levels for puppy, junior handler, veteran and novice. There are three types of title, gold, silver and bronze. Teams scoring over 170 points are included in the CSEN Rally National Rankings. CSEN Rally-Obedience is managed by the CSEN (sports promotion organisation officially recognised by the olympic committee CONI).

In Switzerland, Rally Obedience has existed since 2002, the last rules from 2008 are based on the work of Bud Kramer and the APDT and were updated in 2012.

In Australia, Rally Obedience was adopted by the Australian National Kennel Council in 2012. Australian Rally Obedience has 4 levels: Novice, Advanced, Excellent and Masters.

Novice is performed on lead and all other classes are performed off lead. There is also provision for Rally Obedience Champion in Australian Rally Obedience.
