= Veterinary surgery =

Surgery performed on non-human animals

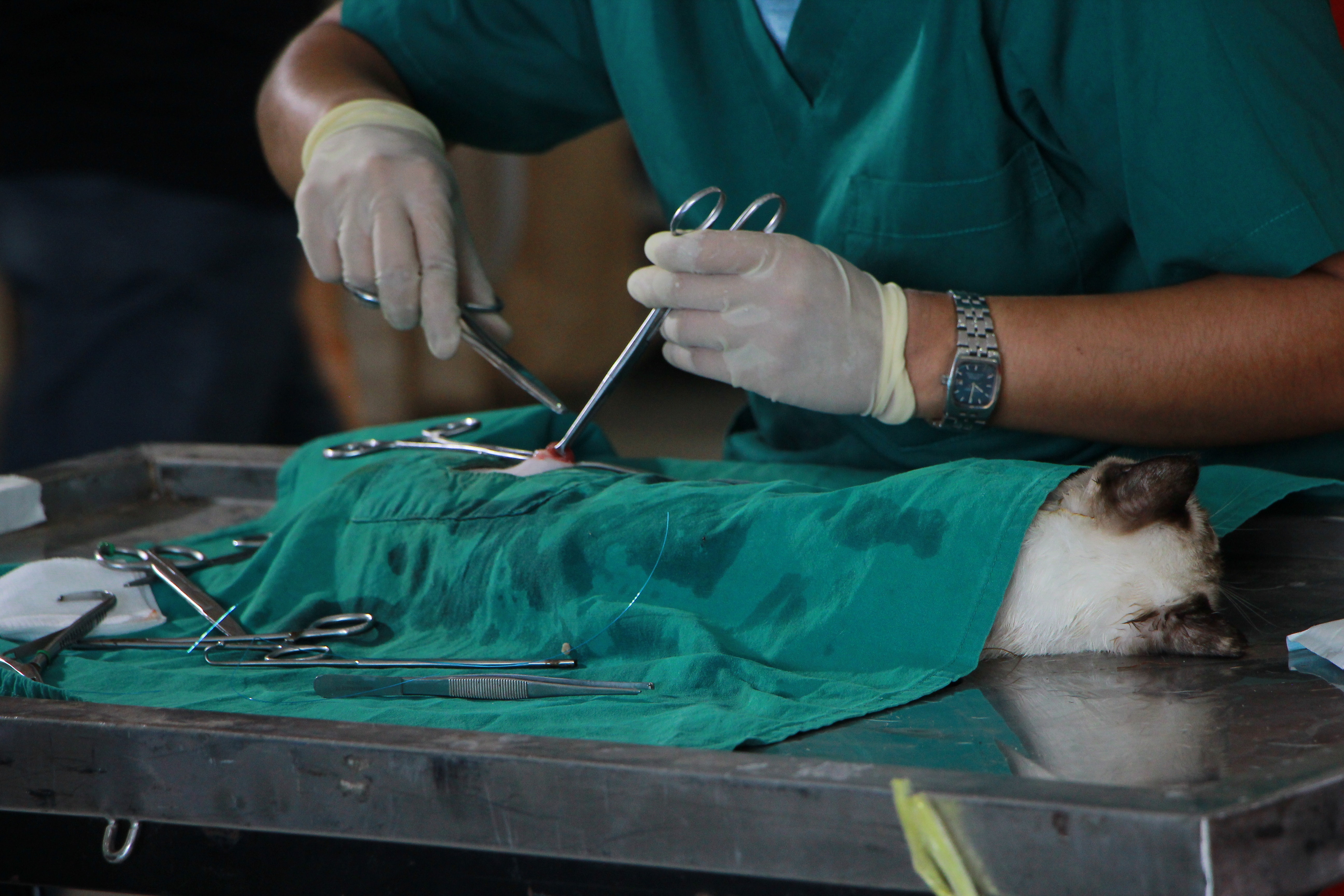
A domestic dog getting surgery.

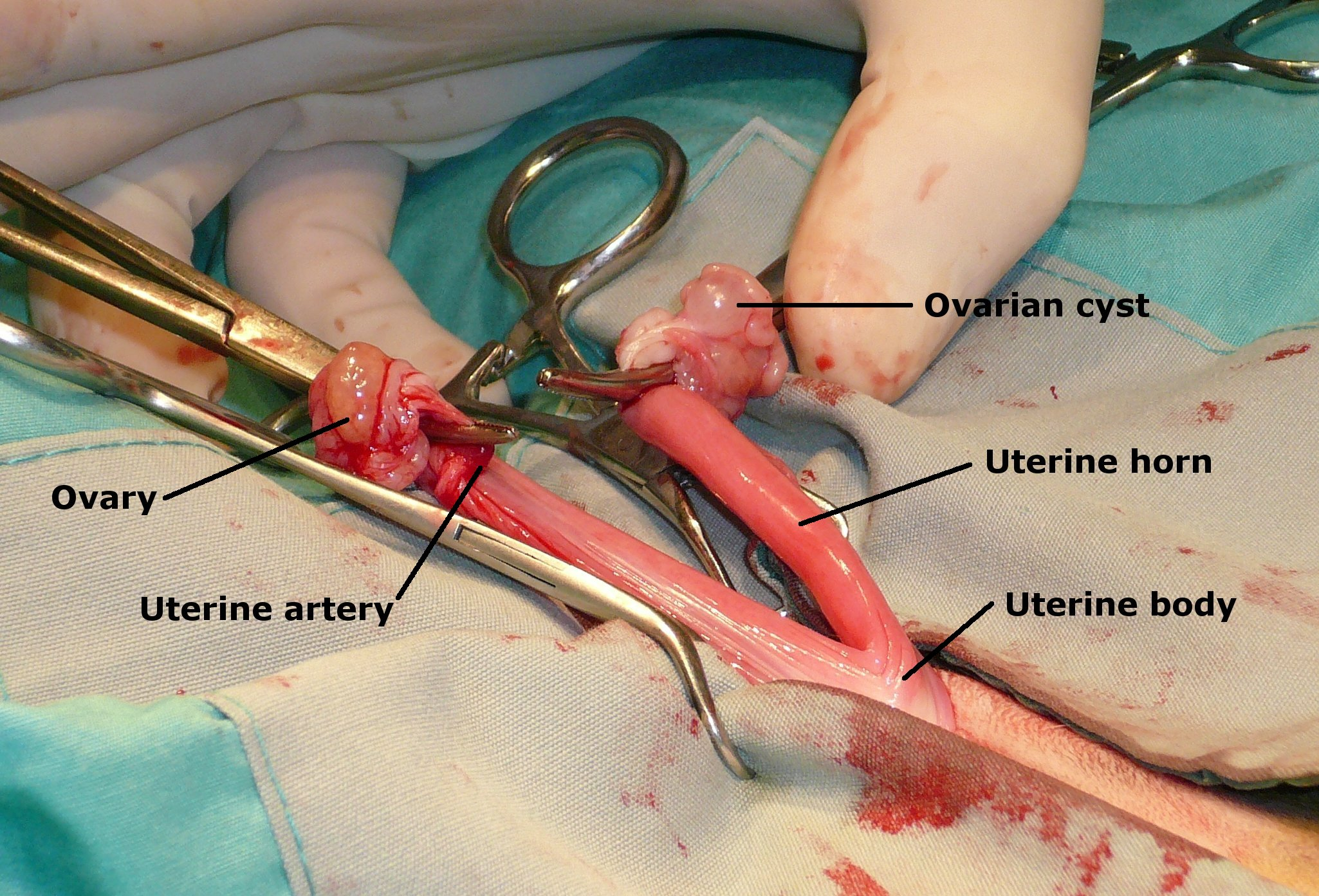
A cat spay

Veterinary surgery is surgery performed on non-human animals by veterinarians, whereby the procedures fall into three broad categories: orthopaedics (bones, joints, muscles), soft tissue surgery (skin, body cavities, cardiovascular system, GI/urogenital/respiratory tracts), and neurosurgery. Advanced surgical procedures such as joint replacement (total hip, knee and elbow replacement), fracture repair, stabilization of cranial cruciate ligament deficiency, oncologic (cancer) surgery, herniated disc treatment, complicated gastrointestinal or urogenital procedures, kidney transplant, skin grafts, complicated wound management, and minimally invasive procedures (arthroscopy, laparoscopy, thoracoscopy) are performed by veterinary surgeons (as registered in their jurisdiction). Most general practice veterinarians perform routine surgeries such as neuters and minor mass excisions; some also perform additional procedures.

The goal of veterinary surgery may be quite different in pets and in farm animals. In the former, the situation is more close to that with human beings, where the benefit to the patient is the important factor. In the latter, the economic benefit is more important.

== Specialization in surgery ==
In the United States, Canada and Europe, veterinary surgery is one of 22 veterinary specialties recognized by the American Veterinary Medical Association respectively the European Board of Veterinary Specialisation. Those wishing to become board certified must undergo a one-year clinical internship program followed by three years of intensive training in a residency program under direct supervision of board certified veterinary surgeons, including performance of a large number of surgical procedures in such categories as abdominal surgery, surgical treatment of angular limb deformities, arthroscopic surgery, surgery of the foot, fracture fixation, ophthalmic surgery, urogenital surgery, and upper respiratory surgery, etc. Once the minimum requirements of training are met, residents are required to pass a rigorous certification examination before being admitted as members (diplomates) of the American College of Veterinary Surgeons or European College of Veterinary Surgeons.

== Veterinary anesthesia ==
Anesthesia in animals has many similarities to human anesthesia, but some differences as well. Local anesthesia is primarily used for wound closure and removal of small tumors. Lidocaine, mepivacaine, and bupivacaine are the most commonly used local anesthetics used in veterinary medicine. Sedation without general anesthesia is used for more involved procedures. Sedatives commonly used include acepromazine, hydromorphone, midazolam, diazepam, xylazine, and medetomidine. α2 agonists like xylazine and medetomidine are especially useful because they can be reversed, xylazine by yohimbine and medetomidine by atipamezole. Xylazine is approved for use in dogs, cats, horses, deer, and elk in the United States, while medetomidine is only approved for dogs. Most surgeries in ruminants can be performed with regional anesthesia.

General anesthesia is commonly used in animals for major surgery. Animals are often premedicated intravenously or intramuscularly with a sedative, analgesic, and anticholinergic agent (dogs frequently receive buprenorphine and acepromazine). The next step is induction, usually with an intravenous drug. Dogs and cats commonly receive thiopental (no longer allowed in the UK), ketamine with diazepam, tiletamine with zolazepam (usually just in cats), and/or propofol. Alfaxalone is a steroid anaesthetic used in many practices in the UK to induce anaesthesia in cats and sometimes dogs. It is similar in physiological effect but different in composition to the now withdrawn Saffan. Horses commonly receive thiopental and guaifenesin. Following induction, the animal is intubated with an endotracheal tube and maintained on a gas anesthetic. The most common gas anesthetics in use in veterinary medicine are isoflurane, enflurane, and halothane, although desflurane and sevoflurane are becoming more popular due to rapid induction and recovery.

== Common veterinary surgeries ==
=== Elective procedures ===
Elective procedures are those performed on a non-emergency basis, and which do not involve immediately life-threatening conditions. These are in contrast to emergency procedures.

=== Sterilization surgery ===
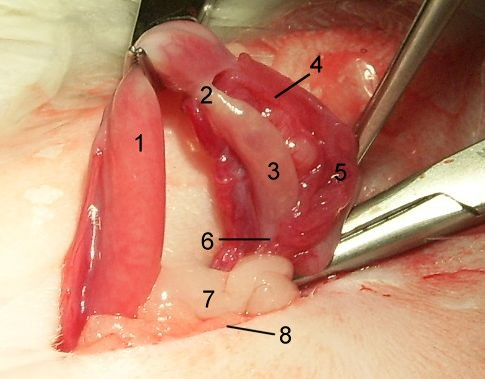
A cat spay

One of the most common elective surgical procedures in animals are those that render animals incapable of reproducing. Neutering in animals describes spaying or castration (also please see castration). To spay (medical term: ovariectomy or ovario-hysterectomy) is to completely remove the ovaries and often the uterus of a female animal. In a dog, this is accomplished through a ventral midline incision into the abdomen. In a cat, this is accomplished either by a ventral midline abdominal incision, or by a flank incision (more common in the UK). With an ovariectomy, ligatures are placed on the blood vessels above and below the ovary and the organ is removed. With an ovariohysterectomy, the ligaments of the uterus and ovaries are broken down and the blood vessels are ligated and both organs are removed. The body wall, subcutis, and skin are sutured. To castrate (medical term: orchiectomy) is to remove the testicles of a male animal. Different techniques are used depending on the type of animal, including ligation of the spermatic cord with suture material, placing a rubber band around the cord to restrict blood flow to the testes, or crushing the cord with a specialized instrument like the Burdizzo.

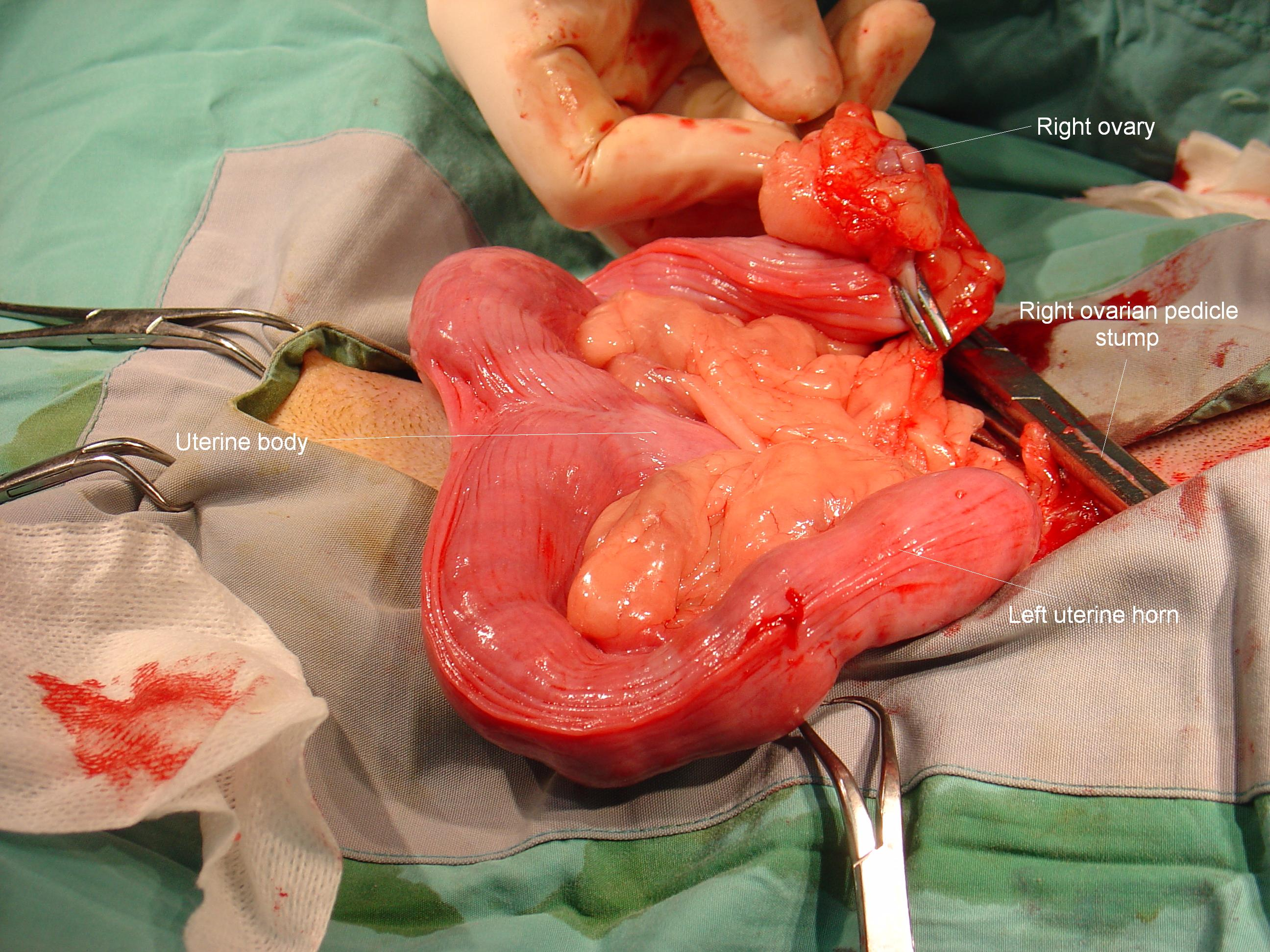
Pyometra surgery

Neutering is usually performed to prevent breeding, prevent unwanted behavior, or decrease risk of future medical problems. Neutering is also performed as an emergency procedure to treat certain reproductive diseases, like pyometra and testicular torsion, and it is used to treat ovarian, uterine, and testicular cancer. It is also recommended in cases of cryptorchidism to prevent torsion and malignant transformation of the testicles. Please see spaying and neutering for more information on the advantages and disadvantages of this procedure.

Laser surgery offers a number of benefits, including reduced risk of infection, less post-operative pain and swelling, reduced bleeding and improved visibility of the surgical field. Better hemostasis and visibility can in some cases minimize the need for anesthesia and/or reduce overall surgical time.

=== Controversial elective animal procedures ===
Other common elective surgical procedures in the United States are declawing in cats (onychectomy), ear-cropping in dogs, tail docking in dogs, horses, and dairy cattle, and livestock dehorning in cattle, sheep, and goats. These procedures have been controversial and recently debated among breeders, veterinary organizations, and animal welfare scientists. The controversy is different for each procedure, but issues arise based on reasons to perform the procedure, differing opinions on techniques and methods, perceived long-term benefits in individual animals, and the development of alternatives. Declawing, for example, consists of removal of the distal phalanges using either a scalpel, scissors or laser. It is typically performed to prevent property damage in house cats, but may also be performed in purebred dogs to meet certain show requirements. Some procedures are illegal in some countries (in the UK, declawing is illegal and tail docking is only allowed in working dogs) and face ethical challenges in others.

=== Dental surgery ===
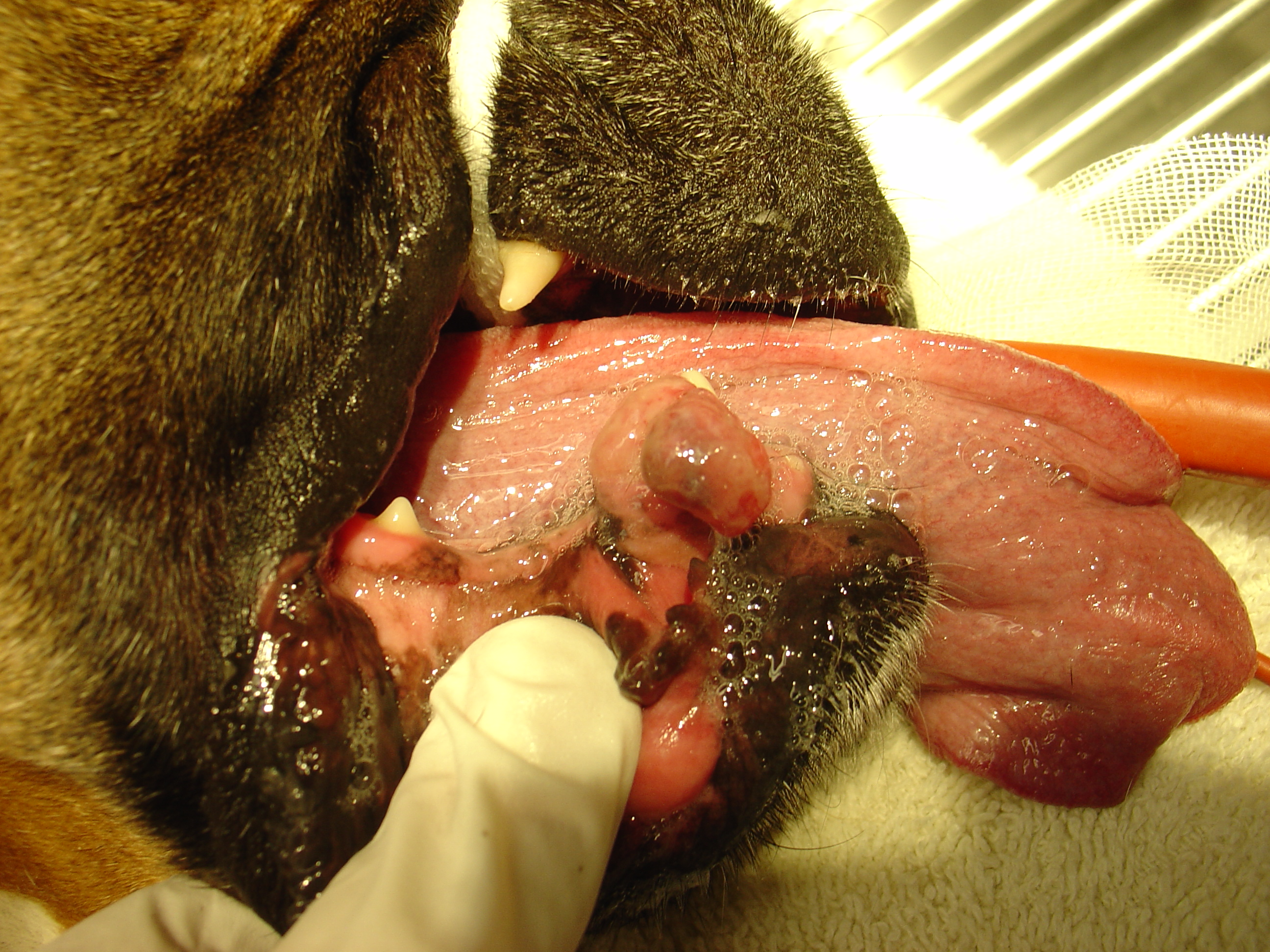
Anesthetised dog with an epulis

Common dental surgical procedures:

- Horses - Floating (grinding down) of uneven teeth edges and removal of wolf teeth.
- Dogs - Dental prophylaxis is commonly performed to remove tartar and treat periodontal disease. This procedure is usually performed under anesthesia. Other common procedures include extraction of abscessed or broken teeth, extraction of deciduous teeth, root canals, and removal of gingival hyperplasia and epulides.
- Cats - Dental prophylaxis as described above for the dog and treatment and extraction of teeth with feline odontoclastic resorptive lesions (FORLs).

=== Surgical oncology ===
In older dogs and cats tumors are a common occurrence, and may involve any or multiple body systems: skin, musculoskeletal, gastrointestinal tract, urogenital tract, reproductive tract, cardiovascular system, spinal cord and peripheral nerves, the spleen and the lining of body cavities. Common skin tumors include lipomas, mast cell tumors, melanomas, squamous cell carcinomas, basal cell carcinomas, fibrosarcomas, and histiocytomas. Skin tumors are removed through either simple excisions or through excisions needing reconstructive plastic surgery. Common oral tumors include melanomas, fibrosarcomas, and squamous cell carcinomas, which are removed with as much surrounding tissue as possible, including parts of the mandible and maxilla. Other types of cancer requiring surgery include osteosarcomas, stomach and intestinal tumors, splenic masses, and urinary bladder tumors.

=== Ophthalmic surgery ===
Common ophthalmic surgeries in animals include:

- Enucleation of the eye to treat glaucoma or eye proptosis.
- Cataract surgery
- Entropion surgery
- Eyelid tumor removal
- Cherry eye surgery
- Exenteration (complete removal) of the orbit, especially for squamous cell carcinoma in the cat and cow.

=== Orthopedic surgery ===
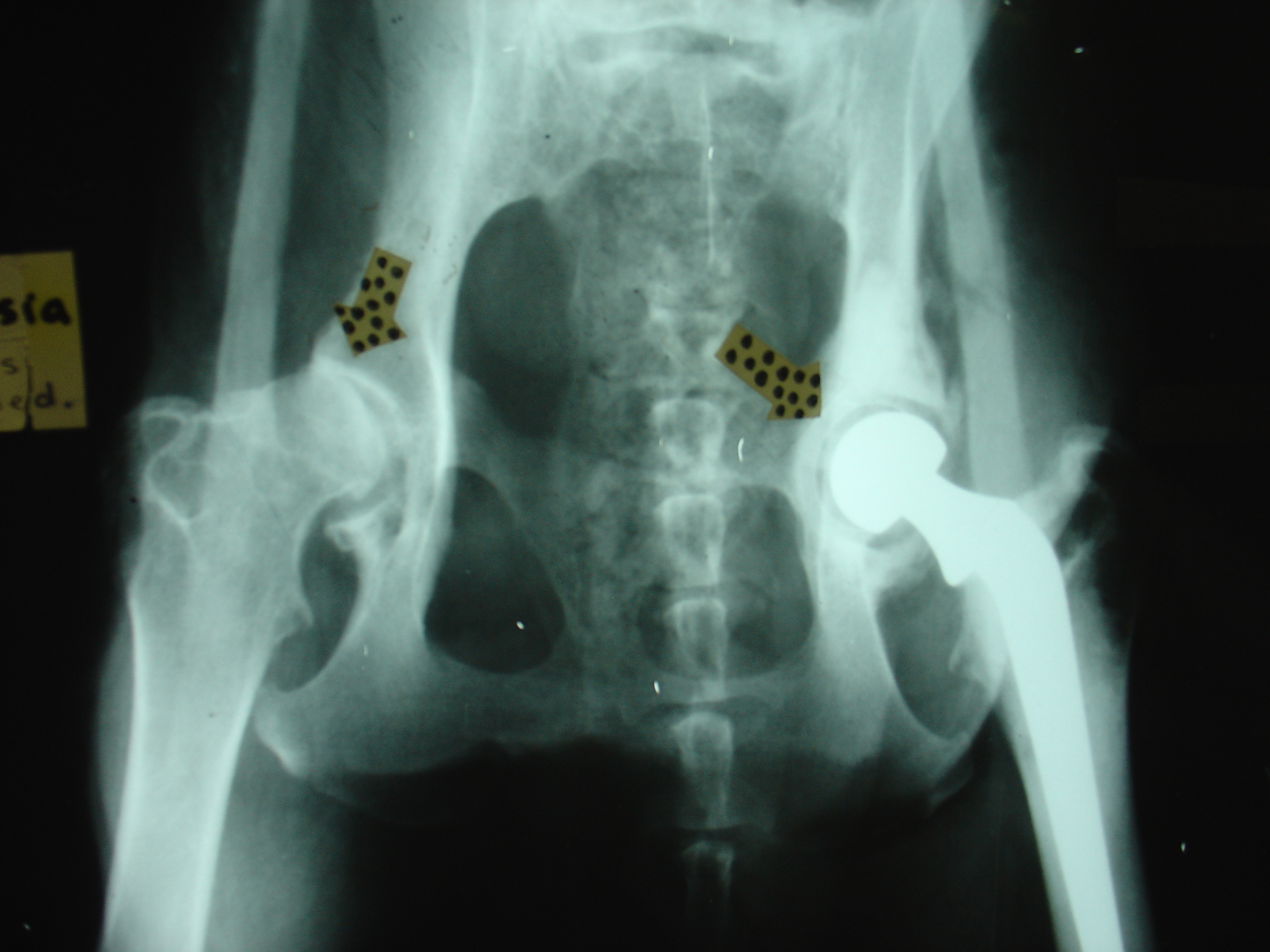
X-ray of a dog with an artificial hip to repair hip dysplasia

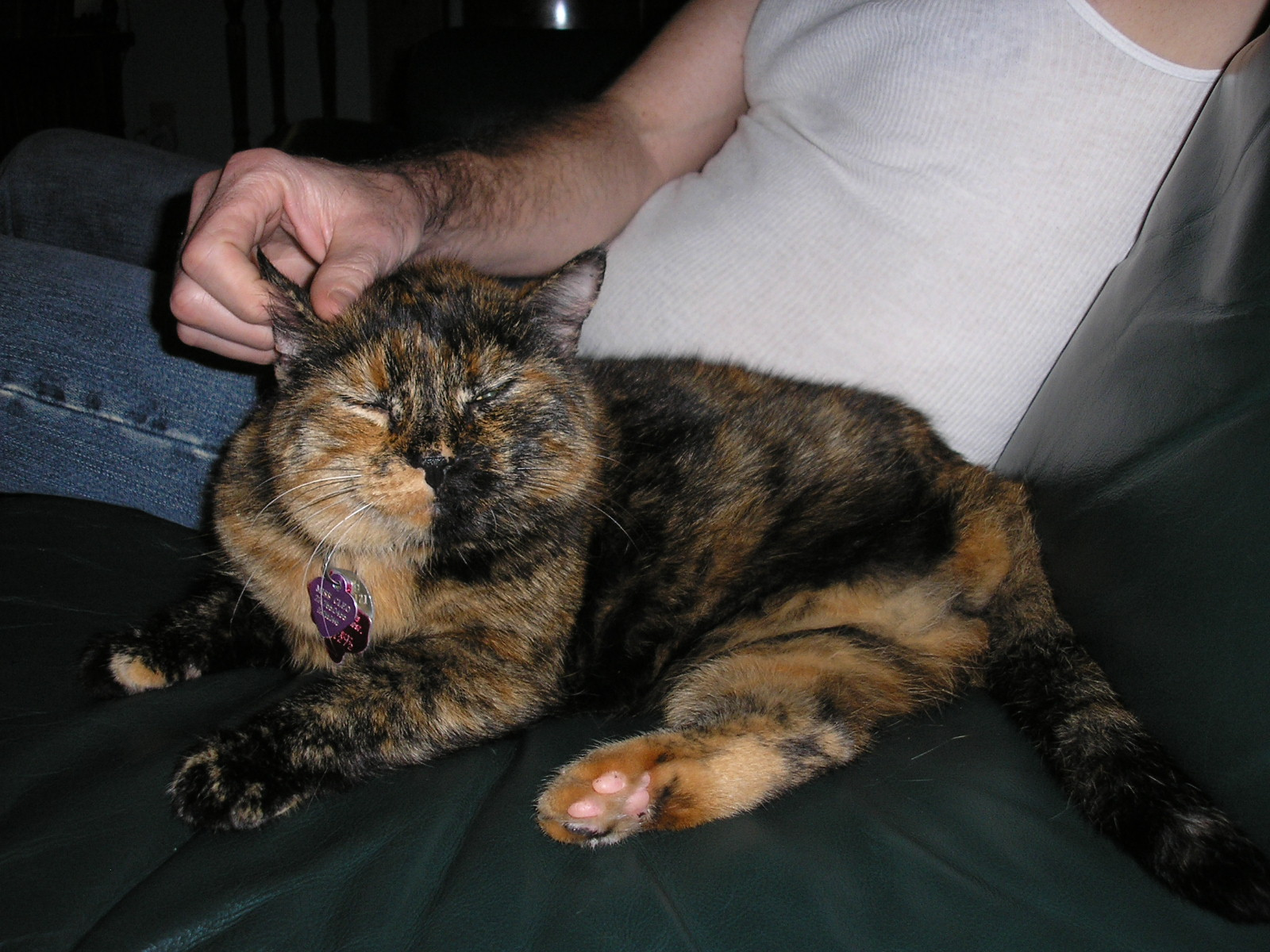
A healthy tortoise-mix cat healed and adapted quickly to her new mobility after a hind leg was amputated.

Common orthopedic surgeries in animals include:

- Ruptured cranial cruciate ligament repair
- For hip dysplasia:
  - Femoral head osteotomy
  - Triple pelvic osteotomy
  - Hip replacement
- Leg amputation
- Bone fracture repair
- Arthroscopy
- MPL - medial patellar luxation

=== Cardiology surgery ===
Common cardiology surgeries in animals include:

- Balloon valvuloplasty: Procedure used to alleviate pain symptoms from cardiac problems such as pulmonic, mitral, and tricuspid stenosis. The purpose of this procedure is to create a smoother blood flow throughout the body by reducing harmful effects from obstructed heart valves. It is considered a minimally invasive procedure. The procedure involves putting a balloon-like object inside of the animal's heart; the balloon inflates and deflates in order to alleviate pain and increase blood flow. Complications can occur if the animal's body rejects the balloon, forming a life-threatening allergic reaction.
- Centesis: Procedure consisting of the removal of fluid from an animal's body in order to manage congestive heart failure. Draining fluid helps prevent tumors from growing around the heart. Animals undergo no anesthesia because little pain occurs during this operation. Catheters and needles of various sizes are punctured into the thoracic cavity. To remove the fluid, veterinarians will use a syringe suction or vacuum. Post-operatively, swelling might occur around the thoracic cavity or appear bruised, but this is normal and is rarely discomforting to the animal.
- Device Embolization of Patent Ductus Arteriosus (PDA): PDA is caused by an abnormal blood flow from right to left inside the heart. This causes patients to develop left-sided congestive heart failure. In order to treat this condition, coils are placed inside ducts of the heart. The coils embolize into the pulmonary arteries. Both the ACDO device and the procedure itself are relatively inexpensive.

=== Other common procedures ===
==== Caesarean section ====
Caesarean sections are commonly performed in dogs, cats, horses, sheep, and cattle. Usually it is done as an emergency surgery due to difficulties in the birthing process. Certain dog breeds such as Bulldogs often need to have this surgery because of the size of the puppy's head relative to the width of the bitch's birth canal.

==== Surgery for gastric dilatation volvulus (bloat) ====
Gastric dilatation volvulus (bloat) is a common condition in dogs in which the stomach fills with gas, and can become torsed. This requires immediate surgical intervention to prevent necrosis of the stomach wall and death of the dog. During surgery, the stomach is deflated and put back into its normal position. A gastropexy may be performed, whereby the stomach is attached to the body wall to prevent this condition from recurring. A splenectomy or partial gastrectomy may also be required.

==== Cystotomy ====
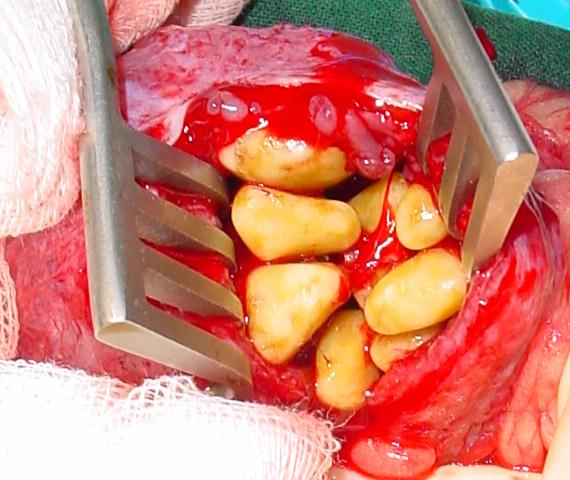
Cystotomy to remove bladder stones

A cystotomy is a surgical opening of the urinary bladder. It is commonly performed in dogs and cats to remove bladder stones or tumors.

==== Wound repair ====
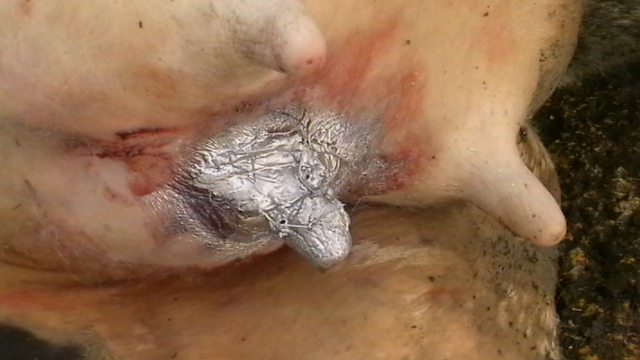
Sutured wound on the teats of a cow

Bite wounds from other animals (and rarely humans) are a common occurrence. Wounds from objects that the animal may step on or run into are also common. Usually these wounds are simple lacerations that can be easily cleaned and sutured, sometimes using a local anesthetic. Bite wounds, however, involve compressive and tensile forces in addition to shearing forces, and can cause separation of the skin from the underlying tissue and avulsion of underlying muscles. Deep puncture wounds are especially prone to infection. Deeper wounds are assessed under anesthesia and explored, lavaged, and debrided. Primary wound closure is used if all remaining tissue is healthy and free of contamination. Small puncture wounds may be left open, bandaged, and allowed to heal without surgery. A third alternative is delayed primary closure, which involves bandaging and reevaluation and surgery in three to five days.

Wounds occurring in the udder and teats of cows are more difficult to repair, due to the difficult access and sensitivity of the organ, and because deep anaesthesia may not be applied to cows.

==== Foreign body removal ====
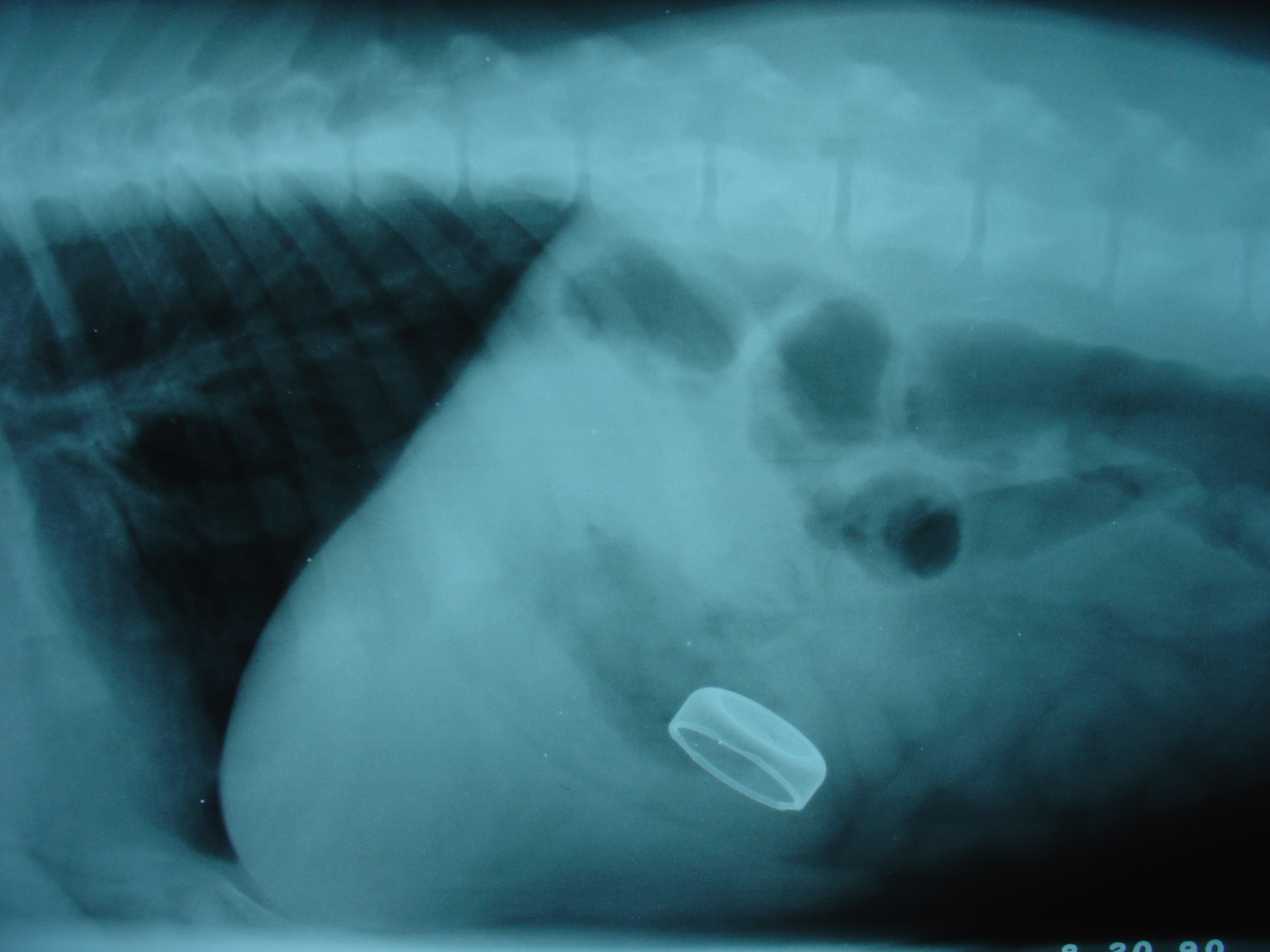
Bottle top swallowed by a dog that had to be removed surgically

A variety of non-edible objects are commonly swallowed by dogs, cats, and cattle. These foreign bodies can cause obstruction of the gastrointestinal tract causing severe vomiting and resulting electrolyte imbalances. The stomach (gastrotomy) or intestine (enterotomy) can be surgically opened to remove the foreign body. Necrotic intestine can be removed (enterectomy) and repaired with intestinal anastomosis. Foreign bodies can also be removed by endoscopy, which although requires general anesthesia does not require surgery and significantly decreases recovery time. However, endoscopic foreign body retrieval is anatomically limited to objects lodged in the esophagus, the stomach or the colon. The condition in cattle is known as hardware disease.

== See also ==
- Cystocentesis
- Organ replacement in animals
- American College of Veterinary Surgeons
- Indian Veterinary Research Institute
