= Norwegian Lundehund =

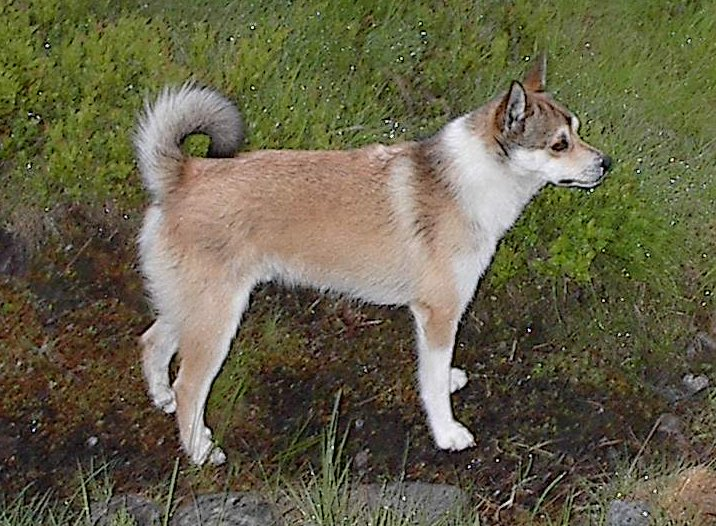
- A Norwegian Lundehund
- Other names: Norsk Lundehund; Norwegian Puffin Dog
- Common nicknames: Lundehund
- Origin: Norway
Traits
- Height: 30–40 centimetres (12–16 in)
- Weight: 5–8 kilograms (11–18 lb)
	Males	7–8 kilograms (15–18 lb)
	Females	5–6 kilograms (11–13 lb)
- Coat: dense and short (seasonal shedding)
- Color: Red-brown to yellow-brown with white areas.
- Litter size: 1-6
Kennel club standards
- Fédération Cynologique Internationale: standard

The Norwegian Lundehund (Norwegian: Norsk lundehund) is a small dog breed of the Spitz type that originates from Norway. Its name is a compound noun composed of the elements lunde, meaning 'puffin', and hund, meaning 'dog'. The breed was originally developed for the hunting of puffins and their eggs on inaccessible nesting places in caves and on cliffs. The breed was at the brink of extinction in the 1960s and preservation efforts have since been underway.

== History ==
The Lundehund was a valuable working animal for hunting puffin birds along the Norwegian coast as food for over 400 years. The first known written record of the breed dates to 1591, when a bailiff wrote of his visit to Værøy that, "one cannot easily retrieve [puffins] from the depth without having a small dog accustomed to crawling into the hole and pulling the birds out." Its flexibility and extra toes were ideal for hunting the birds in their inaccessible nesting locations on cliffs and in caves. Interest for the breed declined when new methods of using nets for hunting puffins were incorporated and a dog tax was created. Around 1900, they were only found in the isolated village of Mostad (spelled Måstad in Norwegian), Lofoten. There have also been stories of Lundehund being used on Lovund, Lurøy by Petter Dass, as cited in his famous work, Nordlands Trompet. The breed was nearly extinct around World War II when canine distemper struck Værøy and the surrounding islands, reducing the population to just two dogs. In 1963, the population was further decimated by another outbreak of distemper. This time, only six dogs survived, one on Værøy and five in eastern Norway, Hamar, of which the latter five were from the same mother. This created a severe population bottleneck. Due to careful breeding with strict guidelines, there are now an estimated 1500 dogs in the world (2022), with around 900 of the population in Norway.

== Characteristics ==
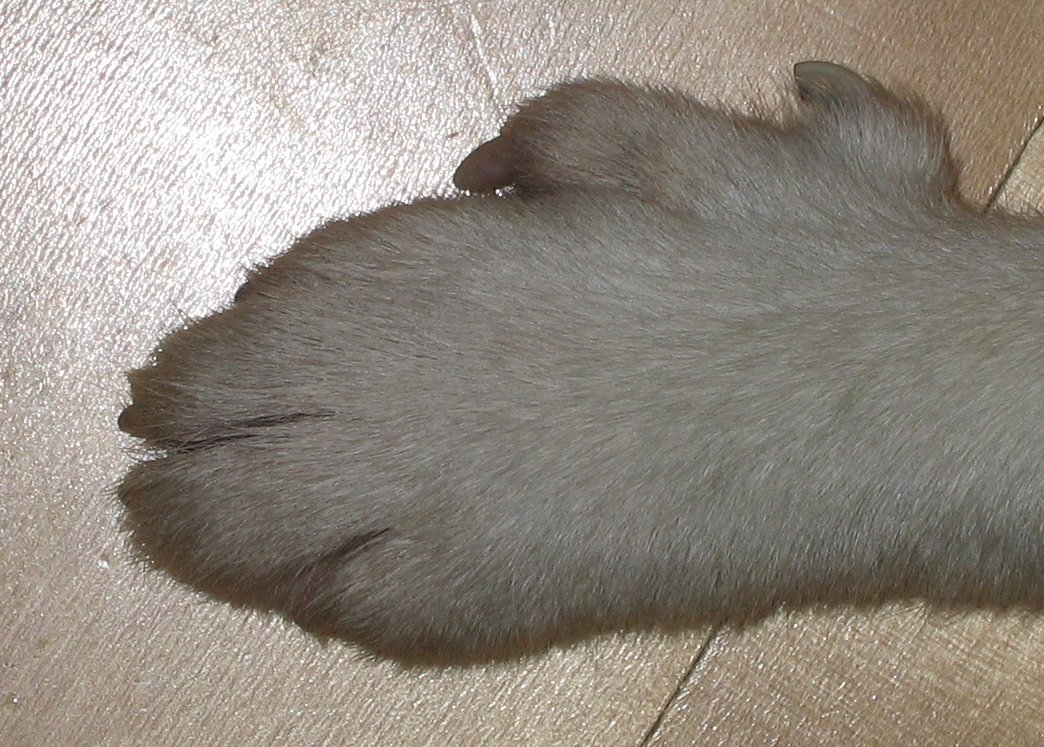
The Lundehund has six toes, which helps it to cling on to the cliffs where it was bred.

The Norwegian Lundehund is a small, rectangular Spitz type dog with several unique phenotypical traits. They have a great range of motion in its joints, allowing it to fit into and extricate itself from narrow passages and tunnels. Dogs of this breed are able to bend their head backwards along their own spine, similar to the New Guinea singing dog, Bornean dingo and Australian dingo, and turn their forelegs to the side at a 90-degree horizontal angle to their body, much like human arms. Their pricked, upright ears can be folded shut to form a near-tight seal by folding forward or backward, protecting them from dirt and parasites.

The Norwegian Lundehund is a polydactyl: instead of the normal four toes per foot, the Lundehund normally has six toes, all fully formed, jointed and muscled. Some specimens may on occasion have more or fewer than six toes per foot, but this is then outside the breed standard.

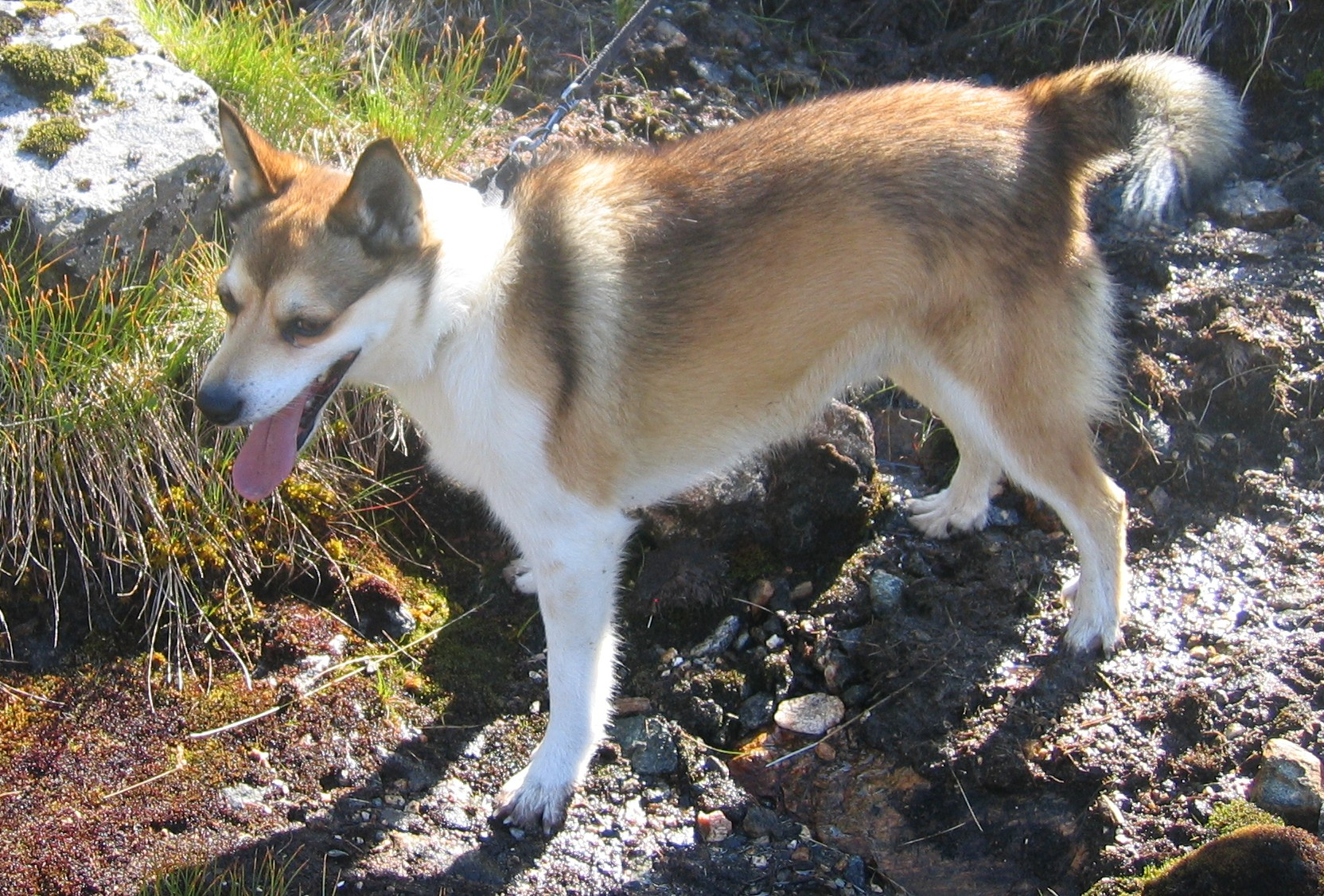
Norwegian Lundehund

The outercoat is dense and rough with a soft undercoat. The Lundehund is adapted to climb narrow cliff paths on the island of Værøya where it originally would have hunted puffins.

The breed is being tested in Tromsø airport by the Norwegian Air Traffic and Airport Management as a solution to airplane bird strikes. The dog is used to search for bird eggs around the airport for disposal.

The Lundehund is an active breed that requires a fair amount of exercise. It is a good family dog, and tolerates children well if properly socialized.

== Health ==
The Norwegian Lundehund population shows signs of inbreeding depression including reduced fertility due to small litter size, inbreeding avoidance behaviors and low sperm quality.

=== Lundehund syndrome ===
Norwegian Lundehund are predisposed to develop intestinal lymphangiectasia, commonly known as Lundehund Syndrome, a protein-wasting enteropathy that causes intermittent diarrhea, vomiting, weight loss, and ascites. In addition, dogs with Lundehund Syndrome are predisposed to chronic atrophic gastritis and gastric neoplasms. A major issue with the Lundehund is the loss of ability to absorb nutrients from food and in extreme cases the dog can starve due to its inability to derive nutrients and protein from food, regardless of food intake. There is no cure, though the disease can be managed; however, many dogs experience repeated acute episodes of Lundehund Syndrome throughout their lives, resulting in extensive medical treatment and poor quality of life. There are indications that for the Lundehund to go on a low fat and higher protein diet has very positive effects on the health with respect to digestive problems. A study on mortality in the Lundehund population showed that 30% of deaths before 11 years of age occurred as a consequence of Lundehund Syndrome and another 10% of other gastrointestinal diseases. The genes responsible and pattern of inheritance for Lundehund Syndrome are not well understood and might, at least in part, be explained by polygenic inheritance and a high frequency—or fixation—of the responsible gene(s).

=== Cross-breeding program ===
Due to the severity of population bottlenecking, the Norwegian Lundehund is now undergoing a cross-breeding program spearheaded by the Norwegian Lundehund club with assistance from a group of geneticists. The program aims to employ a strategy of breeding the Norwegian Lundehund with select individuals from various other Nordic dog breeds including the Norwegian Buhund, Icelandic Sheepdog and Norrbottenspets in order to reduce deleterious recessive genetic disorders.

== See also ==
- Norwegian Buhund
- Norwegian Elkhound
