= Organ replacement in animals =

Organ replacement in animals is an emerging field in veterinary science.

== Kidney transplantation ==
Kidney transplantation has so far only been performed with any degree of success on cats and dogs, most usually cats as they are particularly prone to kidney diseases. The School of Veterinary Medicine at U.C. Davis initiated the Renal Transplantation Program in 1987. Cats can tolerate transplantation from unrelated cats, but must be supported with immunosuppressive drugs for the rest of their lives. When the transplanted kidney is implanted in the recipient the original kidneys are usually left in place.

There are currently ten centers in the world that offer kidney transplants for cats. Most are in the US. UC Davis have since abandoned their program. Kidney transplantation is a controversial treatment option, with longevity, quality of life, as well as ethical considerations. The United Kingdom permitted this procedure in 2003, but a review in 2013 suspended it. Many argue that it causes unnecessary suffering to donor animals.

== Total hip replacement ==
A good candidate for total hip replacement (THR) must be at least 9–12 months old to be sure he has finished developing and weigh at least 30 pounds (14 kg). The hip implant for dogs is similar to its human counterpart, but it is much smaller. X-rays are used to determine the dimensions of an appropriately sized implant.

The femoral stem is usually made of cobalt chrome or stainless steel, while the cup is made of ultra high molecular weight polyethylene. Polymethyl methacrylate is the cement used with cemented implants, whereas 250-micrometres (diameter) titanium beads usually cover the stem surface of the press-fit implants.

The THR is expected to last 10–15 years, which usually surpasses the remaining lifetime of the dog. In less than 5% of cases, the THR will malfunction through loosening of the acetabular cup or femoral fracture. These failures require correction with revision surgery.

== Pacemaker implants ==
The first pacemaker surgery on a dog was performed in 1968. About 300 pacemakers are implanted in dogs each year, even though about 4000 dogs are in need of one. There are no pacemakers made specifically for use in dogs, but human pacemaker users are often outlasted by their pacemakers, leaving behind a functioning pacemaker with less battery power left than a new pacemaker which could be implanted into a dog. One difficulty in implanting used pacemakers is the removal from the deceased human - the pacemaker leads often experience accumulation of surrounding heart muscle tissue and become difficult to remove after death. If the leads are cut in order to remove the pacemaker donation is not possible. If a pacemaker has not been used by a human but has reached its expiry date it will not be suitable for use in a human but could still be used in a dog.

== Blood transfusion ==
For a blood transfusion to take place, the donor and recipient must be of compatible blood types. Dogs have eleven blood types but are born without antibodies in their blood. For this reason, first time transfusions will not have a reaction, but further transfusions will cause severe reactions if the dog has a mismatch in the DEA1.1 blood type. Because the immune systems of dogs are so fierce, cross-match tests must be performed upon each dog blood transfusion. Only about one in every 15 dogs is negative for all antigens and thus, a universal donor. Cats have A, B, and AB blood types with specific factors, but there is no universal donor type Recipient and donor blood must be properly cross-matched. Red cells from the donor are mixed with the serum of the recipient in major cross-matching. In a minor cross-match, the recipient's red cells are compared with the donor's serum. Blood donors must meet specific requirements in order to qualify to donate. They must weigh at least 50 lb for dogs and 10 lb for cats, have high enough blood component values, and have no infectious diseases. One donation could be used by up to two animals.

Policy regarding how donor animals are treated varies. In April, 2014, a veterinarian office in Fort Worth Texas, was accused of keeping dogs that had been presumed to have been euthanized, and using the animals for blood withdrawal.

== Heart valves ==
Open-heart surgery for dogs requires a six- to eight-person team to carefully monitor the patient before and during the invasive surgery. The entire surgery lasts five hours, during which time the dog is connected to a blood oxygenator and the heart is bypassed. The defective heart valve is removed and the replacement valve, typically from bovine pericardium, is precisely sewn into place. The dog’s heart is then restarted and monitored for at least two hours after the surgery is completed. Due to the expense, this is not a common procedure.

== Prosthetic limbs ==
While small dogs and cats can survive comfortably with three legs, larger dogs, horses, and farm animals require the limb to support their weight. Surgery has also been done on birds that are used for breeding purposes. Each prosthetic limb is custom-made to fit the individual needs of the specific animal.

== Orthopedic implants ==
UC Davis’ equine orthopedic surgery program has developed an implant that has been successful in human surgery for a long time. The intermedullary interlocking nail is used to treat horses with a long leg bone fractures. The nails are positioned within the medullary cavity and can be secured to the proximal and distal fracture segments using transcortical screws which penetrate both cortices of the bone, as well as pass through holes in the nail. The nail is placed centrally in the axis of the bone to give full support, unlike bone plates that only give exterior support. In an attempt to aid horses with bowed tendons, research has been done using carbon fiber implants that consist of about 40,000 fibers in total each of which is 8 micrometres in diameter. These fibers induce tissue growth and result in a structure of carbon and tissue about 8 mm in diameter.

== See also ==
- Surgery
- Veterinary medicine
- Hip dysplasia (canine)
- Heart valve dysplasia
- American College of Veterinary Surgeons
