= Russian Spaniel =

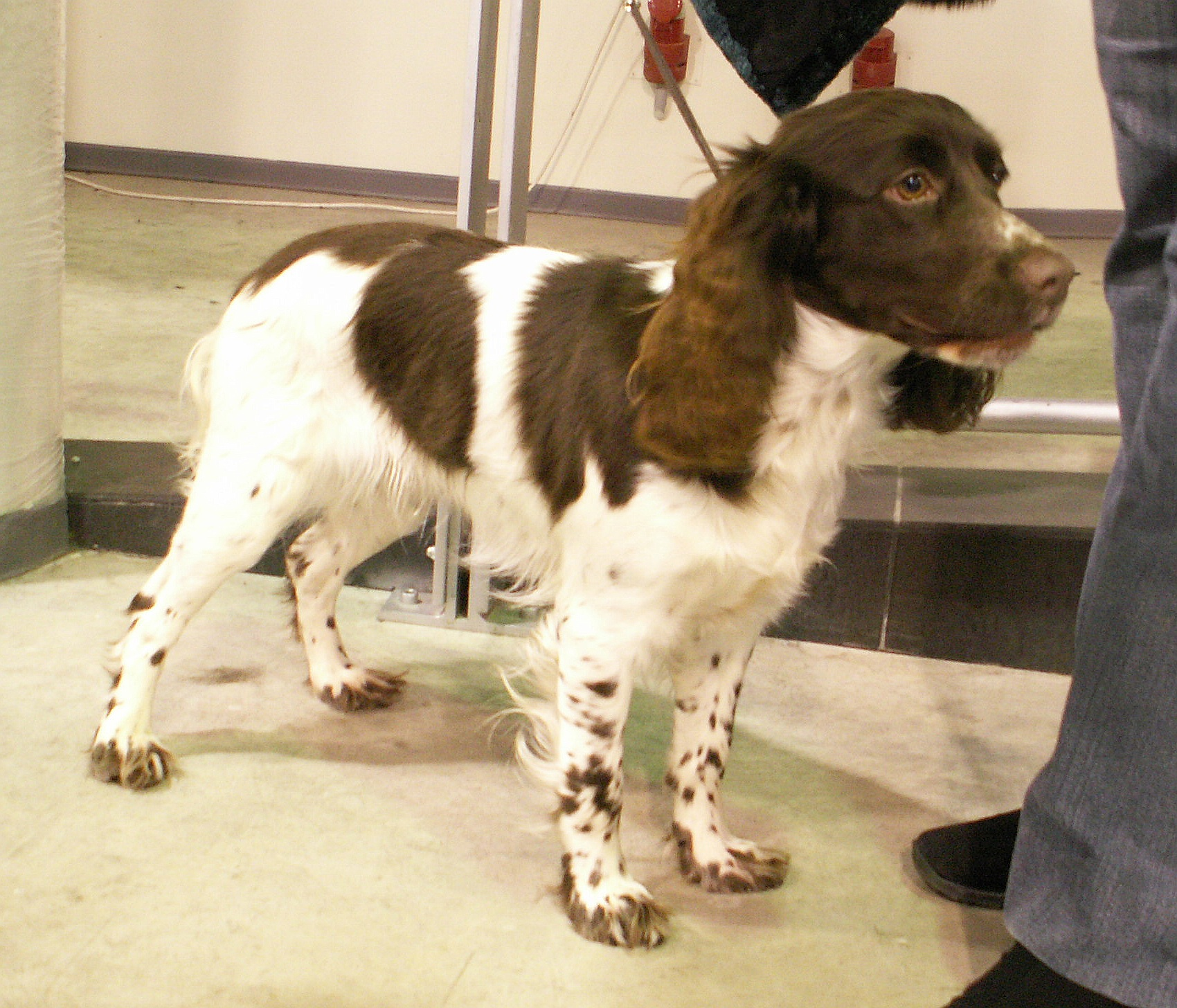
- Other names: Rosyjski Spaniel
- Origin: Union of Soviet Socialist Republics
- Breed status: Not recognized as a breed by any major kennel club.
Traits
Height	Males	15–17.75 inches (38.1–45.1 cm)
	Females	15–17.75 inches (38.1–45.1 cm)
Weight	Males	20–35 lb (9.1–15.9 kg)
	Females	20–35 lb (9.1–15.9 kg)

The Russian Spaniel is a type of spaniel first standardised in 1951 in the Soviet Union after World War II by cross breeding English Cocker Spaniels, English Springer Spaniels and other spaniel breeds. In 1951, the standard of the Russian spaniel was adopted, the selection of dogs for breeding began to be carried out in accordance with the requirements. Physically it is similar to a Cocker Spaniel, but has a shorter, tighter coat and a longer body. Developed and used as hunting dogs, this breed does not suffer from any major health complaints other than those normally associated with spaniels. It is the only gun dog breed originated in Russia. It is used for hunting game birds (marsh, field, upland and waterfowl birds) and hares. Popular in its native Russia, the breed was only introduced overseas in the 1990s, and is not yet recognised by any major kennel clubs, but is recognised by Russian Kynological Federation.

== Description ==
The Russian Spaniel is a small, sturdy dog with a short, tight, silky coat with feathering on the ears and legs. Colors can vary greatly, and can include solid colors without white markings, piebald, speckled, black and tan, and combinations. The head and ears are also usually dark.

The Russian Spaniel resembles the English Cocker Spaniel, with a body similar to the field lines of that breed though with the longer ears of the show line. The body of the Russian Spaniel tends to be longer than that of the English Cocker however, and the breed has only one line rather than being split into separate specific show and field lines of the same breed.

Both the male and females of the breed weigh on average 28–40 lb (13–18 kg) and are around 15–17 inches (38–43 cm) at the withers. This makes them similar in size or a little larger than the English Cocker Spaniel which weighs approximately 13–14.5 kg (29–32 lb) and is on average between 15.5 and 16 inches (39 and 41 cm) with the females being a little smaller at 15–15.5 inches (38–39 cm).

Bred primarily as hunting dogs, their goal is to find the bird, send it into the air and then to retrieve it on command after the hunter has shot the quarry. The Russian Spaniel is suited for hunting in marshland, fields, woodland, for birds as well as rabbits and other small game. The breed is also popular in their native Russia as their small size makes them suitable to be kept in busy cities, and easily transported to hunting sites.

== Health ==
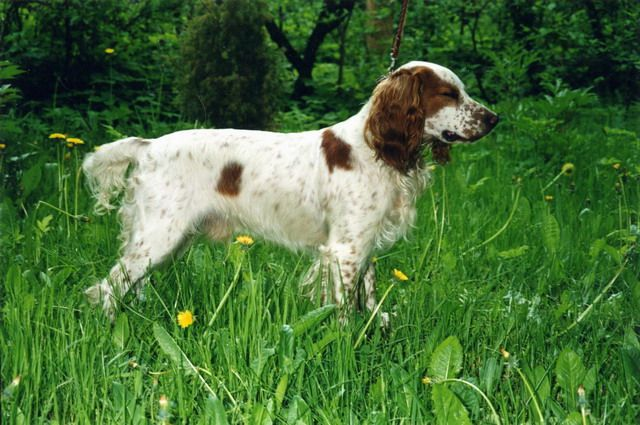
A brown and white Russian Spaniel

As with all long-eared spaniels, Russian Spaniels require checks to prevent ear infections. The breed does have an inclination to gain weight easily, which can be prevented by controlling food intake. The Russian Spaniel can be prone to food allergies, which are usually identified at between 1 and 5 months of age with the most common allergens being chicken and carrots. There are no other breed-specific health issues currently known.

== Temperament ==
It is an energetic, free-spirited breed. Even though it is a gundog, it is also kept as a companion dog because of its easy-going nature and devotion. It is a cheerful, active dog and is always ready to play, responding to any form of attention with a happily wagging tail. Russian Spaniels are trainable, can make a good watchdog, and are amiable with children.

The Russian spaniel swims and dives to retrieve wounded birds. It is used for hunting marsh, field and upland game. Previously the breed was also tested for blood trailing. Russian spaniels possess a good instinct, stamina. They could be used as a watchdog. Although it is believed that deliberate development of watchdog qualities could harm the hunting qualities of the dog.

== History ==
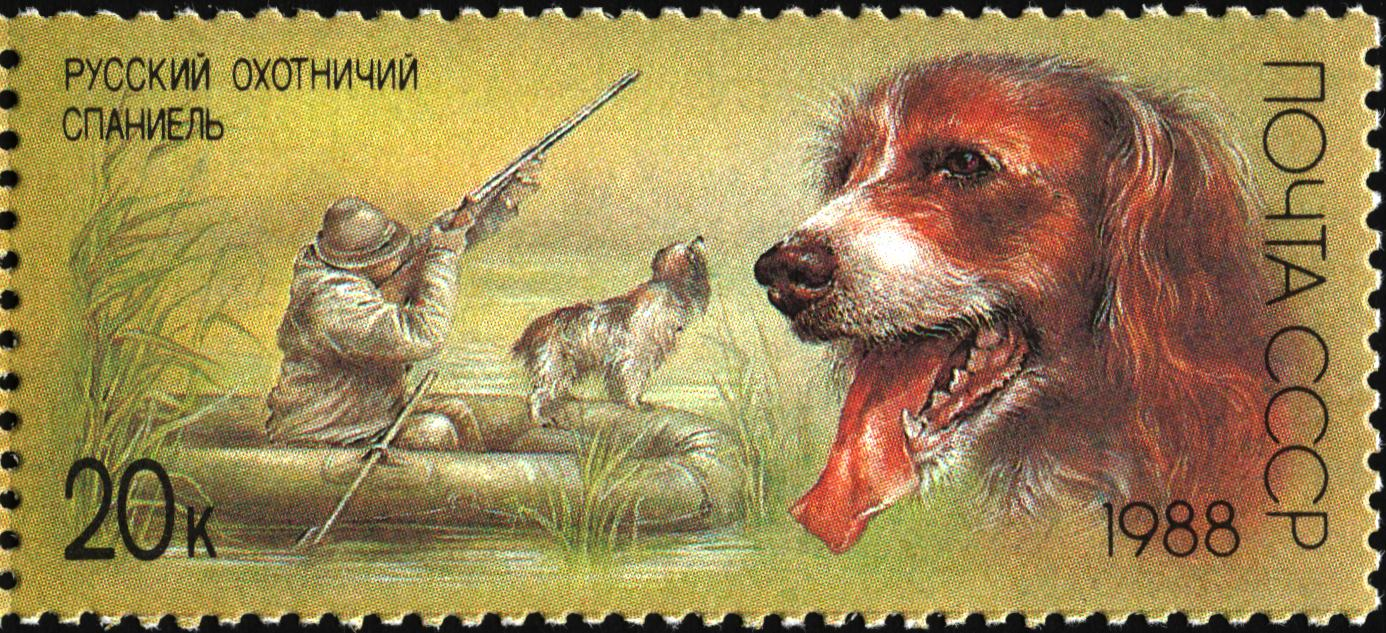
A USSR stamp from 1988 featuring a multi-colored Russian Spaniel

The Russian Spaniel is the youngest of the Russian gundogs. It originated mostly from English Cocker Spaniels and English Springer Spaniels. Breeds known as Russian Spaniels have been mentioned as early as 1891 in New Zealand.

The first recorded spaniel in Russia was a black Cocker Spaniel owned by hunting enthusiast Grand Duke Nicholas Nikolaevich towards the end of the 19th century. Because of its noble connections, spaniels of various breeds were imported to St. Petersburg and Moscow. Some were used for hunting, but the smaller spaniels were not of much use in Russian bird hunting due to the weather and terrain conditions. It was at the beginning of the 20th century that selective breeding began for longer legged spaniels; specifically importing Springer Spaniels to create a rather mixed Russian Spaniel.

By the late 1930s there were a variety of spaniels in Moscow, Leningrad and Sverdlovsk that did not fit any specific spaniel breed standard, but were not yet standardised into the modern Russian Spaniel. Purposeful breeding after World War II led to the original Russian Spaniel standard in 1951. Further revised standards were issued in 1966 and 2000.

The popularity of the breed in Russia increased after the early 1990s, with Moscow dog shows since that time annually including between 120 and 131 Russian Spaniels, which qualifies the breed as one of the most popular, along with the Irish Setter. In 2002, the Russian Spaniel Club was set up in the United States to increase the knowledge of the breed outside Russia and to enable owners to register their dogs.

== International recognition ==
Although not recognised by any major kennel clubs, the Russian Spaniel is recognised by the Continental Kennel Club, Federation of International Canines, North American Kennel Club, and Universal Kennel Club International. For recognition by The Kennel Club a breed is required to apply with names and addresses of UK owners/importers, number of dogs bred in the UK, copies of the pedigrees of UK dogs - at least three generations, it must be recognised in its country of origin and statistics on registration figures in that country, statistics on entries in shows in that country and at international level, any inherited health conditions, when the breed registry was closed, the standard from the country of origin and a brief history and details of any working activities.

In order to become recognised fully by the American Kennel Club, they must first compete in a Miscellaneous Class. The requirements to compete in that class are to demonstrate a following by having a minimum of 100 active members in a national breed club, a population of 300 to 400 dogs, with third generation pedigrees and for all dogs in those pedigrees to be of the same breed, a distribution across twenty or more states, and the breed standard must be reviewed and approved by the AKC. Currently there are five dogs in the AKC's Miscellaneous Class which are Dogue de Bordeaux, Redbone Coonhound, Irish Red and White Setter, Norwegian Buhund and Pyrenean Shepherd. Typical stays in that class are between one and three years, and the national club of the breed must have held seminars, shows and judges workshops prior to being fully recognised.
