= Norrbottenspets =

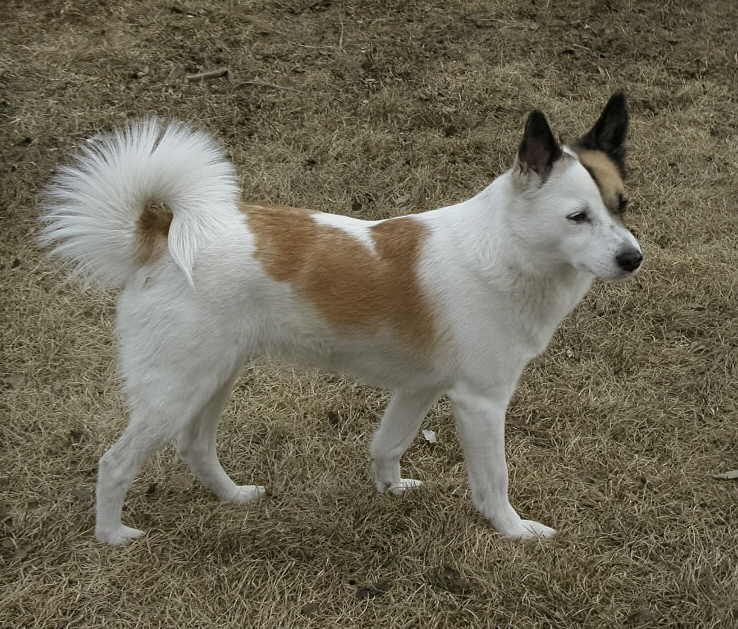
- Other names: Norrbottenspitz; Pohjanpystykorva
- Origin: Sweden
Traits
Height	Males	43–47 cm (17–19 in)
	Females	40–44 cm (16–17 in)
- Weight: 11–15 kg (24–33 lb)
- Coat: Double coat
- Colour: White with yellow or red patches
Kennel club standards
- Fédération Cynologique Internationale: standard

The Norrbottenspets, also known as the Norrbottenspitz, and the Pohjanpystykorva, is a breed of spitz type dog from Sweden. A small- to medium-sized breed with typical spitz-like features, the Norrbottenspets has traditionally been kept as a hunting dog in Northern Sweden and is closely related to similar Nordic spitz breeds such as the Finnish Spitz.

== History ==
The Norrbottenspets takes its name from the region of Norrbotten in the northeast of Sweden, with "spets" being the Swedish spelling of "spitz"; the breed is also known as the Norrbottenspitz, the Nordic Spitz and the Pohjanpystykorva. The origins of the breed are unknown; it is likely both arctic and German Spitz blood is present in its ancestry. The Norrbottenspets is the Swedish equivalent of the closely related Finnish Spitz, and the Russian Karelo-Finnish Laika; the various breeds only becoming distinct with separate kennel club recognition for dogs found across various national borders. Almost lost in the 20th century, in 1948 the Swedish Kennel Club declared the Norrbottenspets extinct and it was not until the 1960s that sufficient numbers were found for the breed to be declared extant. Never having received the international attention of the Finnish Spitz or the Norwegian Buhund, the Norrbottenspets is rarely seen outside of Scandinavia, although with a revival in interest in national breeds, today the Norrbottenspets is a relatively popular breed in Sweden.

== Description ==
Profile of six-month-old bitch

Trotting in a show ring

The Norrbottenspets is a small- to medium-sized, compact and robust breed with typical spitz features. Slightly smaller than the Finnish Spitz, the breed standard states dogs should stand between 43 and 47 centimetres (17 and 19 in) with bitches being slightly smaller, standing between 40 and 44 centimetres (16 and 17 in); they typically weigh between 11 and 15 kilograms (24 and 33 lb). The breed has a thick, dense double coat that protects them well during arctic winters; the outer coat is hard, short and straight whilst the undercoat is fine and dense. The breed can be seen in all colours, although white with red, yellow, cream, tan or black markings is most common; the breed standard states they should be white with either yellow or red patches. The breed has a wedge-shaped head with erect ears; their body is strong and it is as long as it is tall, with a deep chest. Their tail is long and carried high, curled over their back, as typical of spitz dogs.

The Norrbottenspets is described as a highly intelligent and energetic breed. They have a curious nature and require considerable exercise, becoming destructive without it. Generally even-tempered, the breed is said to have a low tolerance for children bothering them.

== Uses ==
Today the majority of Norrbottenspets are kept as pets, but traditionally the breed has been maintained as a hunting dog and general farm dog. The breed is used to hunt a wide variety of game including gamebirds, deer including elk, as well as occasionally bear; there are many stories of Norrbottenspets chasing away bears that have attacked their master. A tireless, determined hunter with a keen nose, many Norrbottenspets have been trained as search and rescue dogs.

== Health ==
A Swedish study reviewing over 200,000 dogs registered for a veterinary insurance company in 1995 and 1996 found that the Norbottenspets had the lowest morbidity of all dogs, purebred and mixed.

== See also ==
- List of dog breeds
