= Dislocation of hip in animals =

Dislocation of hip (coxofemoral luxation) may occur in domestic animals.

It is a not rare condition, usually unilateral, in:

- cattle, among others, after calving.
- dogs, resulting from trauma or as a complication of hip dysplasia.

The same illness also exists in human medicine.

The condition can be observed after the forced traction of fetus while delivery, slip of animal on a floor. More commonly seen in animals with poor nutrient ration at end stage of gestation which results in osteoporosis of bones & joints due to which the acetabulum notch become shallow and femur comes out if it while delivery, ketonemia also has adverse effect on coxo-femoral luxation.

== Symptoms ==
In dogs, it occurs mainly in an upwards and forwards direction. Hence, the affected leg is shortened, and the greater trochanter prominent.

In cattle, it occurs mainly craniodorsally or caudoventrally, but other directions are possible. A typical stance is seen in craniodorsal luxations, with a shortened limb, and a protrusion of greater trochanter.

== Treatment ==
Attempts in reduction in cattle are generally not successful. Affected animals, at least not too heavy ones, can live with the disease for a long time because of the formation of a sort of pseudo-joint in the hip.

Dogs with hip dysplasia and unilateral dislocation can live if the other leg is not too severely hit. Then there is a severe muscular atrophy of the thigh. Compensation occurs with musculation of the shoulders.

== Literature ==
- Hip dislocation in cattle
  - P. Greenough, F. Weaver & A. Weaver; Lameness in cattle, Wright Scientica, Bristol, 1981, ISBN 0-7216-5205-0, p. 269–273.
  - G. Rosenberger, Krankheiten des Rindes, Verlag Parey, Berlin, 1978, ISBN 3-489-61716-9, s. 463–466.
- Hip dislocation in dogs
  - H.J. Christoph; Diseases of dogs, Pergamon Press, New York, 1975, ISBN 0-08-015800-5, p. 406–410.

== See also ==
- Hip dysplasia (canine)
