= Finnish Spitz =

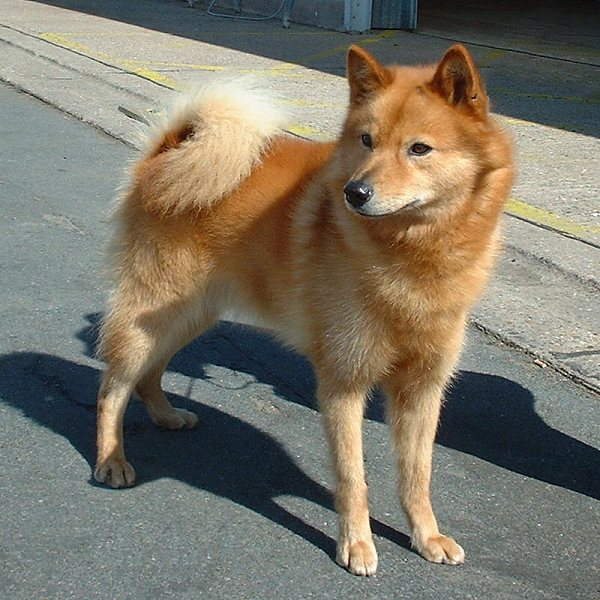
- Other names: Finnish Hunting Dog; Finnish Spets; Finsk Spets; Loulou Finois suomalainen pystykorva suomenpystykorva
- Origin: Finland
Traits
Height	Males	44 to 50 cm (17 to 20 in)
	Females	39 to 45 cm (15 to 18 in)
- Weight: 12 to 13 kg (26 to 29 lb)
- Coat: Double
- Color: Red, red gold or gold
Kennel club standards
- Suomen Kennelliitto: standard
- Fédération Cynologique Internationale: standard
- Notes: National dog of Finland

The Finnish Spitz (Finnish: suomenpystykorva Finnish pronunciation: [ˈsuo̯menˌpystyˌkorʋɑ]) is a breed of dog originating in Finland. The breed was originally trained to hunt all types of game from squirrels and other rodents to bears. It is a "bark pointer", indicating the position of game by barking, and drawing the game animal's attention to itself, allowing an easier approach for the hunter. Its original game hunting purpose was to point to game that fled into trees, such as grouse, and capercaillies, but it also serves well for hunting elk. Some individuals have even been known to go after a bear. In its native country, the breed is still mostly used as a hunting dog. The breed is typically friendly and good with children, so it is suitable for domestic life. The Finnish Spitz has been the national dog of Finland since 1979.

== Lineage ==
Nearly all dog breeds' genetic closeness to the gray wolf is due to admixture. However, several Arctic dog breeds show a genetic closeness with the now-extinct Taymyr wolf of North Asia due to admixture. These breeds are associated with high latitudes - the Karelo-Finnish Laika, the Siberian Husky and Greenland Dog that are also associated with arctic human populations, and to a lesser extent the Shar Pei. An admixture graph of the Greenland Dog indicates a best-fit of 3.5% shared material, however an ancestry proportion ranging between 1.4% and 27.3% is consistent with the data. This indicates admixture between the Taymyr wolf population and the ancestral dog population of these 4 high-latitude breeds. This introgression could have provided early dogs living in high latitudes with phenotypic variation beneficial for adaption to a new and challenging environment. It also indicates the ancestry of present-day dog breeds descends from more than one region.

== History ==
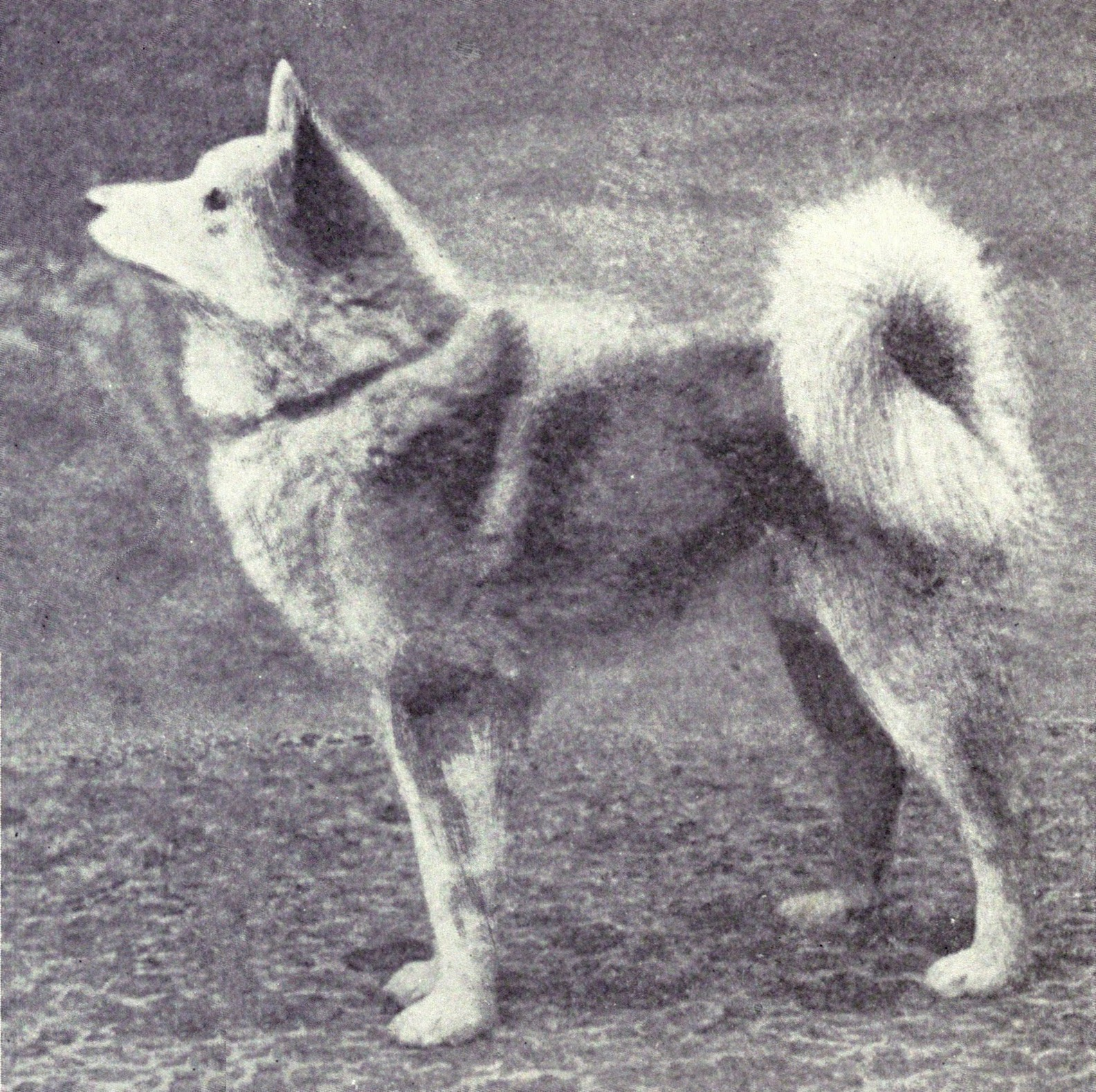
Finnish Spitz from 1915

It is assumed that the Finnish Spitz developed from Spitz-type dogs that came from central Russia with migrants 3,000 years ago. These small clans of woodsmen relied on their dogs to help them obtain food, and the excellent hunting ability of the Finnish Spitz made it a favorite choice.

By 1880, as advanced means of transportation brought diverse peoples and their dogs together, Finnish Spitzes mated with other breeds of dogs, and were becoming extinct as a distinct breed. At about that time, a Finnish sportsman from Helsinki named Hugo Roos observed the pure native Finnish Spitz while hunting in the northern forests. He realized the many virtues of the pure Finnish Spitz breed and decided to select dogs that were untainted examples of the genuine Finnish Spitz in order to try to revive the breed. Thirty years of careful breeding resulted in the modern Finnish Spitz; the dogs are descendants of his original foundation stock.

Finnish Kennel Club has revised the breed standard six times, and the latest version was confirmed in 1996. In 1979, when the club celebrated its 90th anniversary, the Finnish Spitz was declared Finland's national dog breed. The club is also working for including the hunting experience with the Finnish Spitz on the UNESCO Intangible Cultural Heritage List.

== Appearance ==
The proper conformation is a square build, meaning that the length of the body is the same or slightly shorter than the height of the withers to the ground. The length of the body is measured from the point of the shoulder or forechest in front of the withers to the rump. Females are usually a little longer in the back than males. Both sexes should appear slightly longer in the leg than the back.

Dewclaws can appear on front and/or back feet. If back claws appear, they should be removed. The front dewclaws can be removed, if desired.

=== Coat ===
The Finnish Spitz has a typical double coat, which consists of a soft, dense undercoat and long, harsh guard hairs that can measure 2.5 to 5 cm (one to two inches) long. The outer coat should not exceed 2.5 centimetres (0.98 in) at the ruff. The coat should be stiffer, denser, and longer on the neck, back, back of thighs, and plume of the tail, shorter on the head and legs. Male dogs should sport a slightly longer and coarser coat than female ones, who have a slightly more refined coat.

The pluma of the tail is important to the overall look of the dog but should not be too long. Feathered long tail hairs without sustenance can give the dog an unkempt look. Additionally, the tailset is important and the Finnish Spitz should be able to move its tail from one side to the other. Most Finnish Spitz have a preferred side and this is not incorrect.

Proper care of the coat is most important. The Finnish Spitz blows coat or loses its undercoat twice a year. It is imperative that owners brush out the old undercoat so the new coat can grow properly. Although a dog may look fluffy and full, excessive undercoat may cause serious skin problems.

In the show ring, the coat should be shown as completely natural; a brush through the coat is acceptable, but no trimming is allowed, not even of whiskers. However, any excessive undercoat should be removed. Some exhibitors choose to show dogs with excessive undercoat to make the dog's coat appear more lush. Failing to shed undercoat is considered neglect by some judges who prefer a clean and combed coat. Another exception is the hair under the bottom of the feet. The hair under the feet as well as the toe nails should be nicely trimmed for show.

=== Color ===
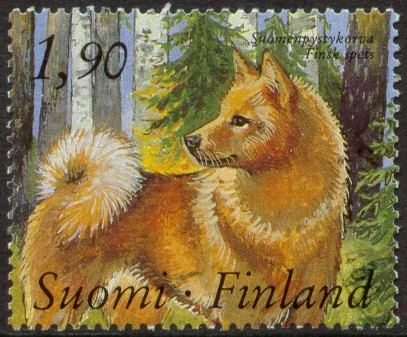
1989 postage stamp depicting the Finnish Spitz

Puppies are often described as looking similar to a red fox cub. They are born dark grey, black, brown, or fawn with a vast amount of black. A fawn-colored puppy or one with a large amount of white of the chest is not preferable for show purposes. The color of the adult dog can be assessed by an experienced breeder at birth, but even then, the color may change slightly as the puppy grows.

The adult color is typically a golden-red with variations from pale honey to dark chestnut. There is no preference for a particular shade as long as the color is bright and clear with no hints of dullness. The coat should never be a solid color. It should be shaded and without any defined color changes. The coat is usually at its darkest shade on the back of the dog, gradually getting lighter around the chest and belly. The undercoat must always be lighter in color than the topcoat, but is never allowed to be white. A small patch of white, no more than 1.5 cm (0.59 in) wide, is allowable on the chest, and white tips on the feet are acceptable, but not desired.

The nose, lips, and rims of eyes should always be black.

=== Height and weight ===
Height at withers (American Kennel Club breed standard):

- Males: 44.5 to 50.8 cm (17.5 to 20.0 in)
- Females: 39.4 to 45.7 cm (15.5 to 18.0 in)

Weight:

- Males: 12–14 kg (26–31 lb)
- Females: 7.3–10 kg (16–22 lb)

== Temperament ==
This breed is active, alert and lively. They need one or two long walks each day and will be fairly inactive indoors. This breed will not adapt well to a strictly kenneled living situation; they need a balance of outdoor exercise and indoor play time with the family.

Finnish Spitzes are considered to interact well with people and they are especially good with children. They are always ready to play with children but if ignored, they will usually walk away. As with all dogs, young children and dogs should always be supervised when together. It is an independent breed and will be attached to its family while remaining aloof with strangers. The Finnish Spitz tends to be protective; males have more domineering traits than females.

Most Finnish Spitzes get along well with other dogs in the house. They are bred as a hunting dog and thus are unreliable around small animals and pet birds, but on an individual basis may live well with cats, especially if they are raised with them.

=== Barking ===
The breed barks at anything perceived to be out of the ordinary. Barking is a major part of their hunting activities. In Finland, these dogs are prized for their barking abilities, which can range from short, sharp barks to many barks per minute that sound like a yodel. The Finnish Spitz can bark as many as 160 times per minute. In Scandinavia, a competition is held to find the "King of the Barkers." In Finland, their barking ability in the field must be proven before a conformation championship can be earned.

When used as a hunting companion, the barking is a way to signal the hunter that the dog has located prey in the forest. They can be trained to reduce the amount of barking, although the barking does make them superb watchdogs.

=== Training ===
Finnish Spitzes are independent, strong-willed, intelligent dogs. They are best trained with a soft voice and touch. This breed will not respond well to harsh training methods. They should be trained with a light touch and positive reinforcement methods. With patience and calm yet firm handling, the Finnish Spitz can be a wonderful companion.

== Health ==
The Finnish Spitz is typically a very healthy breed, with few general health concerns. However, breeders should be consulted to understand the prevalence of a specific disorder in this breed. Below is a short list of what is known to occur:

- Elbow dysplasia
- Epilepsy

Factors associated with idiopathic epilepsy in Finnish Spitz dogs are age (<4 years old), number of feeding times per day, exposure to extreme stressful situations (hunting), and sex. Epilepsy was more prevalent in male dogs than females. Dogs that had idiopathic epilepsy were found to have depressed, nervous, and desensitized character.

- Hip dysplasia
- Patellar luxation

Median lifespan is about 11.2 years.

== See also ==
- List of dog breeds
