= Icelandic Sheepdog =

Icelandic breed of dog

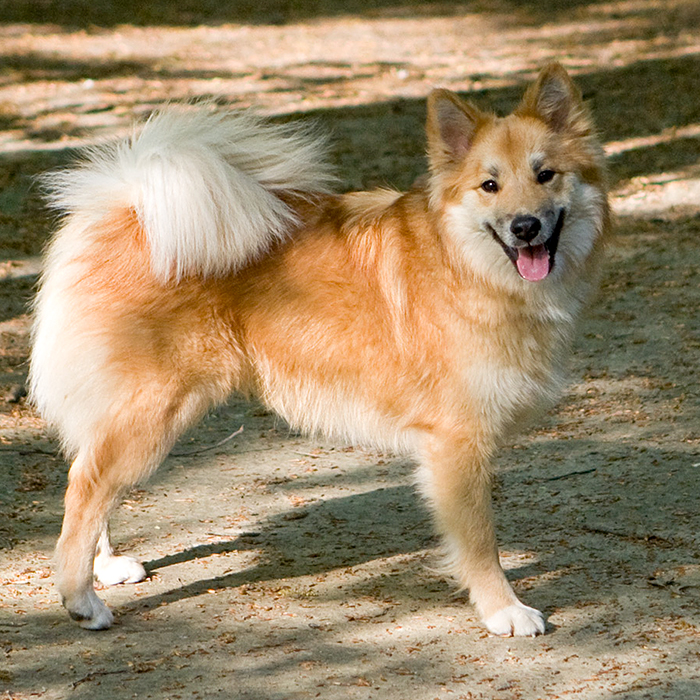
- Other names: Icelandic Spitz; Iceland Dog; Íslenskur Fjárhundur; Friaar Dog; Canis islandicus
- Origin: Iceland
Traits
Height	Males	46 centimetres (18 in)
	Females	42 centimetres (17 in)
- Weight: 9–14 kg (20–30 lb)
- Coat: thick, double
- Colour: tan, black, chocolate-brown or grey, all with white markings
Kennel club standards
- Fédération Cynologique Internationale: standard

The Icelandic Sheepdog (Icelandic: Íslenskur fjárhundur, pronounced [ˈistlɛnskʏr ˈfjaurˌhʏntʏr̥]), is an Icelandic breed of dog of Nordic Spitz type. It derives from dogs brought to Iceland by Viking settlers in the ninth century; it is both similar and closely related to the Buhund of Norway and the Vallhund and Norrbottenpets of Sweden, which derive from the same ancestral stock.

It is the only dog breed indigenous to Iceland. Its traditional uses include herding of both sheep and horses.

== History ==
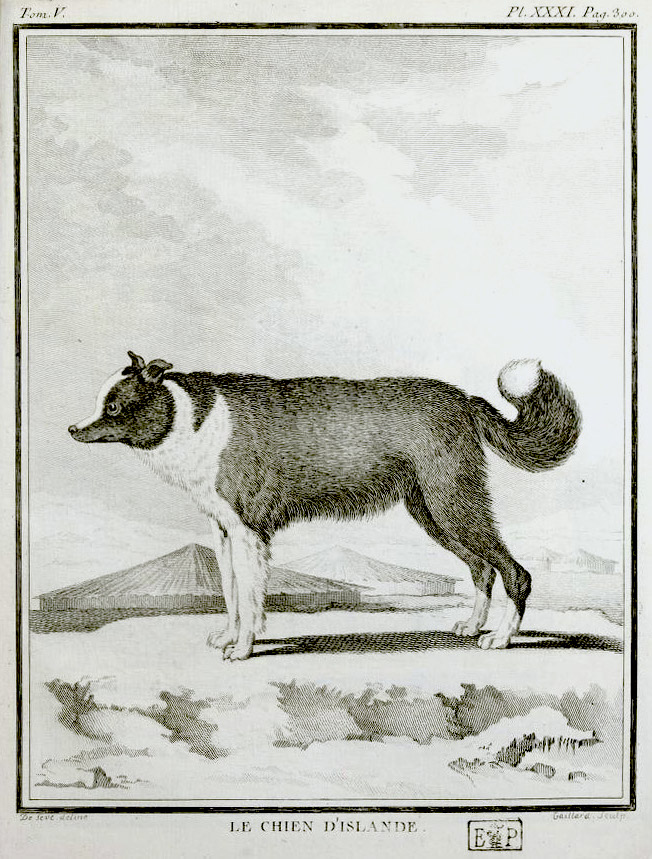
Engraving of the Chien d'Islande from the Histoire Naturelle of Georges-Louis Leclerc, Comte de Buffon, Tome V; (1755); engraved by Gaillard after Jacques de Sève

The Icelandic Sheepdog is one of very few breeds of dog for which claims of ancient origin are demonstrably supported by both archaeological and written evidence. It derives from dogs brought to Iceland by Viking colonists from 874 onward; these are thought to have been from the same ancestral stock which gave rise to the modern Buhund of Norway and Vallhund of Sweden.

As a result of commerce with Iceland in the Middle Ages, the dog became fairly well known in other European countries including England and France; an early description dates to 1492. It is mentioned by John Caius in his writings on dogs in 1570, and by William Shakespeare in Henry V, thought to date from about 1599. In his Account of Island, alias Ice-land; in the Year 1662, published posthumously, Sir Thomas Browne wrote: "... they bring another sort over, Headed like a Fox, which they say are bred betwixt Dogs and Foxes; these are desired by the Shepherds of this Country".

The Chien d'Islande or Iceland Dog was both discussed and illustrated in the fifth volume of the Histoire Naturelle of Georges-Louis Leclerc, Comte de Buffon, published in 1755. In 1788 it was classified by Johann Friedrich Gmelin as a species, Canis islandicus.

Plague and canine distemper destroyed over 75% of the breed in the late nineteenth century, leading to a ban on the importation of dogs to Iceland. The purebred Icelandic Sheepdog was again bordering extinction in the late twentieth century.

A national kennel club, the Hundarræktarfélag Íslands or Icelandic Kennel Club, was formed in 1969; at its first dog show, at Hveragerði in 1973, twenty-three of the sixty dogs shown were of this breed. In 1979 a breed society was established, the Deild Íslenska Fjárhundsins or Icelandic Sheepdog Breed Club. In 1994 the Alþingi (national parliament) determined that the Icelandic Sheepdog was part of the cultural heritage of the country, and should be protected as a national breed. In 1996 an international breed association, the Icelandic Sheepdog International Cooperation, was formed; it has ten European member kennel clubs (including that of Iceland), plus the American Kennel Club.

The breed was definitively accepted by the Fédération Cynologique Internationale in 1972, and was recognised by the American Kennel Club in 2010.

In 2015, registrations in the Nordic countries were: 137 in Iceland; 100 in Denmark; 44 in Finland; 35 in Norway; and 76 in Sweden. In 2022 the total number registered world-wide was approximately 5000.

== Characteristics ==
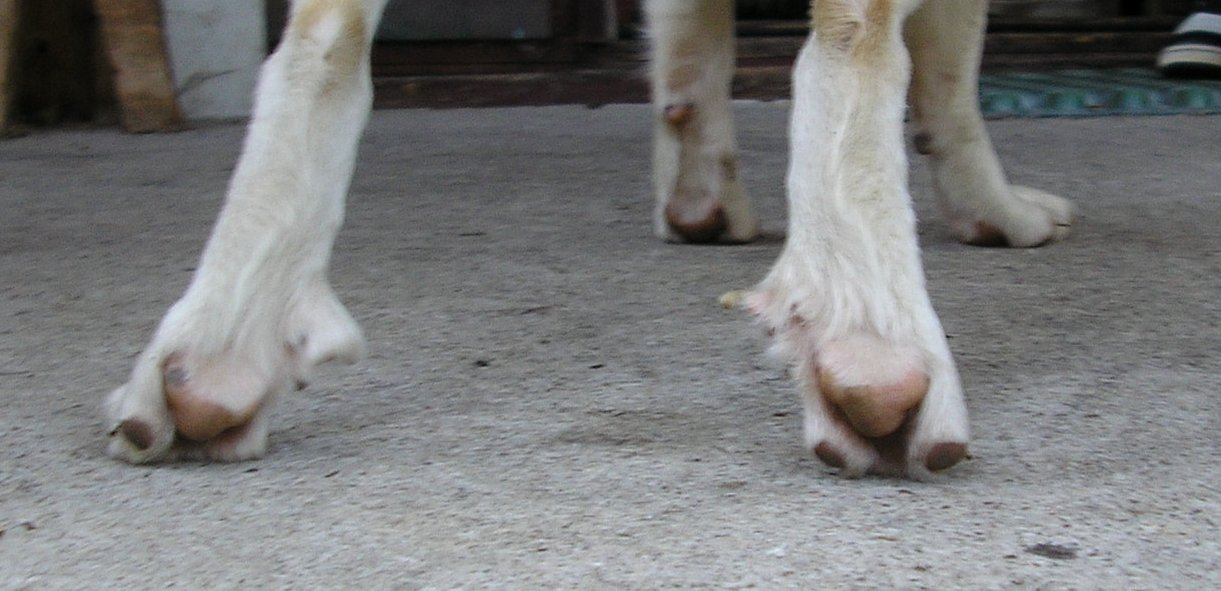
Double dewclaws on the hind legs

It is a muscular and hardy dog, and moves with ease over the rough terrain of rural Iceland. Weights are commonly in the range 9–14 kg, with heights at the withers of about 45 cm for males and a few centimetres less for females. The coat is thick and provides good protection from the weather; there are two distinct types: short-haired and long-haired. It may be light, tan or fawn, ranging from milky-white, cream-colour to a reddish brown; or black, chocolate-brown or grey. White and light markings, often extensive, occur with all colours; light, tan and grey animals may have a black mask. Dogs may be expected to live for some twelve to fifteen years.
