= Hip replacement (animal) =

Veterinary surgical procedure

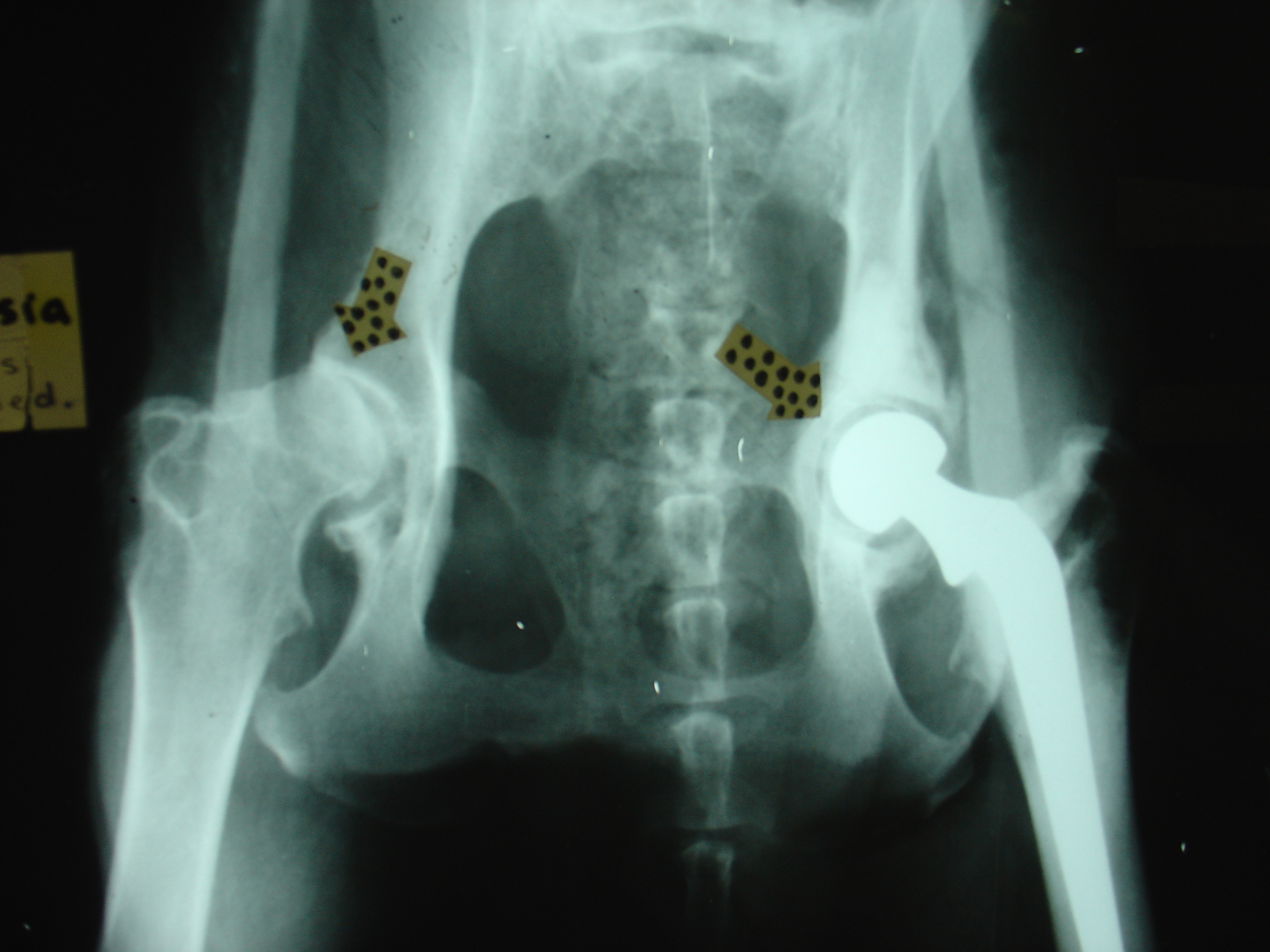
Hip replacement in a dog

Hip replacement is a surgical procedure performed in dogs and cats as a salvage procedure, to alleviate severe pain in the hip due to, for example, hip dysplasia or irreparable bone fracture. The procedure replaces the head of the femur and the acetabulum with prosthetic implants. Because animals under about 40 pounds (18 kg) carry their own weight with little strain on each leg, hip modification surgeries are often sufficient to restore hip function in many cases. As a result, while hip replacement on animals can be seen in any animal of any size, from cats upwards, it is most often performed in the medium-large breeds of dogs.

An animal suffering from hip dysplasia may have been in some degree of chronic pain all its life from a very young age but may show no overt sign of pain. Rather, they have adapted to the pain over an extended period, and learned to live with it. As a result, in many animals, successful hip replacement gives animals a level of playfulness and happiness not previously seen.

As with all surgeries, results vary, and there is both risk and uncertainty involved.

== Implant material ==
Animal hip replacements are usually made from the same material as human replacements were, historically, made—a metal (cobalt chrome or titanium) femoral component, and an ultra high molecular weight polyethylene acetabular component.

Since animals have a shorter life than humans, their hip replacements can safely be assumed to be lifelong and will not wear out or need replacing. By contrast, human hip replacements are sometimes deferred until older, to avoid the possible need for replacement later on in life.

== Considerations and aftercare ==
Other treatments may give a good quality of life with fewer attendant risks. Surgery for dogs, as with humans, is a final alternative when non-invasive methods are unable to treat a condition, since they are irreversible and carry risk. Conditions such as hip dysplasia and arthritis can often be treated with appropriate medications that help the body handle pain, inflammation, or joint wear and tear.

Animals which are prospective candidates for hip replacement should have no other spinal, neural, or rear leg abnormalities, in order to be significantly helped by a hip joint procedure.

Since the reduced joint mobility seen in conditions such as dysplasia may result in loss of muscle mass and quality as a dog ages, there is often an advantage in having hip replacement whilst the dog is at an early age, while muscle is more likely to re-develop, rather than in old age when convalescence is longer and more difficult. However, this is a major surgery taking several months to fully recuperate, involving the large muscle groups of the hips, and is irreversible. Whilst it has a high success rate (circa 95%) in the hands of a good surgical team, even in older dogs, it is therefore often recommended to avoid it until quality of life is seriously affected beyond the capability of medication to control.

Thus the benefits of hip replacement at a younger age must be set against the risks and the existing quality of life attainable with medication, lifestyle change, or non-surgical handling. Usually a course of medications is tried in any event, to assess how the animal responds to them.

An animal will usually need a minimum of 2 months convalescence to recover from hip replacement surgery. This allows the new artificial acetabular cup (the caput, or hip socket) to bond properly to the pelvis (hip bone). During this period, the animal must be restricted to carefully limited mobility and exercise, as the joint is still bonding and new bone is being laid down. So animals must be prevented from over exercise, or from climbing, jumping or putting any strain whatsoever beyond gentle use, on the joint. The animal must also be kept away from slippery or smooth flooring such as tiles, marble or polished wood since these put considerable lateral (sideways) strain on the hips. This can be a difficult process for a dog as many usual behaviors must be strictly prevented for this period. A pet crate may be a sensible precaution, if in doubt.

Usually, in the case of a double replacement (both hips), whenever possible one hip is operated on at a time and allowed to heal before the other is replaced. This ensures that there is always the maximum natural support during the healing process, although bilateral (double) hip replacements are possible and can be performed if appropriate.

== Variations in vets' views ==
Some vets will recommend hip replacement at any age over puberty, if suitable conditions are met. Others view it as a surgery to be avoided at all costs unless there is no alternative. The issue here appears to be threefold: consideration of cost, avoidance of surgery where possible, and historical reasons that this has usually in the past been a treatment afforded older dogs and not usually considered for young and middle aged animals or less advanced conditions.

Aftercare recommendations vary also. Some vets recommend as little as 1–2 days in hospital after replacement, others as much as 4–7 days. All vets agree that movement must be restricted for a significant time after surgery. Some suggest that normal activity can be resumed after 5 weeks, others state it is unsafe until after 8 weeks. In both cases, a cautious approach will probably do no harm, if there is doubt.

== History ==
The first feline hip replacement in the New York area was performed in March 2007.

== See also ==
- Veterinary surgery
