= Cystocentesis =

Veterinary procedure

Cystocentesis is a veterinary procedure, mainly performed in dogs and cats, in which a needle is inserted into the urinary bladder through the abdominal wall, and a urine sample is obtained. The clinical procedure can be done either by external palpation and stabilization of the urinary bladder which is called blind cystocentesis or the urinary bladder may be visualized using sonography, while guiding the needle into it, in real time, referred to as ultrasound-guided cystocentesis Cystocentesis has its advantages, although rarely a benign episode of fainting may be triggered by it.

== Indications ==
Diagnostic cystocentesis is the most common reason to perform the procedure. Commonly practiced in small animal medicine, it provides an uncontaminated urine sample for urinalysis, biochemical assessment, or urine culture for bacterial speciation and antibiotic sensitivity. Diagnostic cystocentesis is used to reduce the risks of bacterial, cellular and debris contamination that other methods (like free catch or catheterization) have. This aids the veterinarian to tailor the treatment plan based on the changes observed in the urine's characteristics and to target antimicrobial treatment to help avoid development of antibiotic resistance by matching the antibiotic to the bacterial sensitivity.

Therapeutic cystocentesis may be employed to relieve pressure buildup due to urethral obstruction i.e. decompressive cystocentesis. Therapeutic cystocentesis is typically a last resort for relief, as a greatly distended bladder is at risk of rupture when punctured. When possible, a safer method of emptying the urinary bladder in this condition is by urethral catheterization.

Research utilizing cystocentesis is mostly focused on the pharmacokinetics of medications, and in studies utilizing biomarkers.
