= Karelo-Finnish Laika =

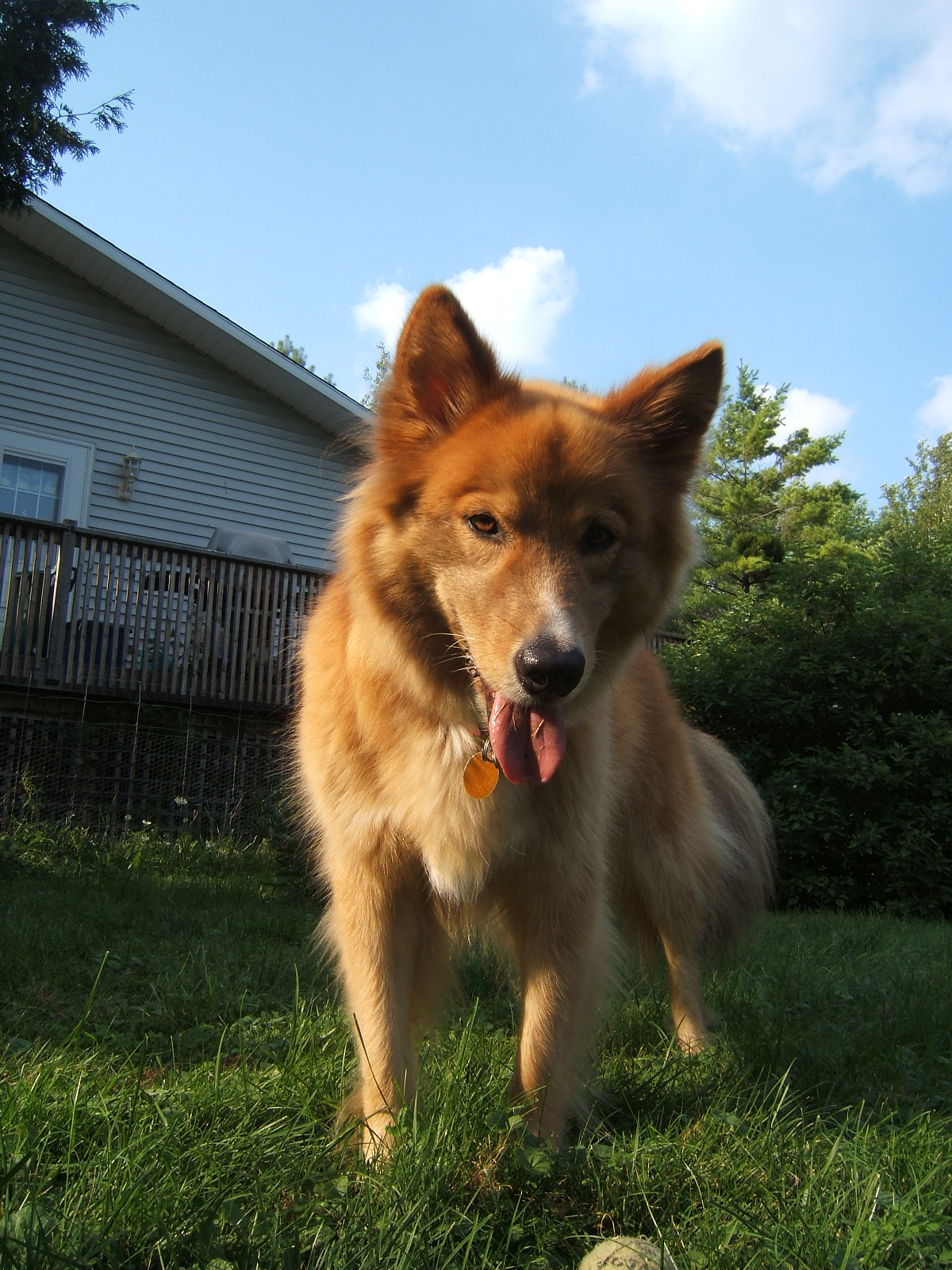
- Origin: Karelia region of Finland & Russia
- Foundation stock: Finnish Spitz
- Breed status: Not recognised as a breed by any major kennel club.
Traits
- Height: 38–50 cm (15–20 in)
- Weight: 14–16 kg (31–35 lb)
- Coat: Solid red, occasionally fawn or black with some white markings
- Colour: Thick double coat

The Karelo-Finnish Laika is a breed of spitz-type dog from Karelia.

== History ==
Prior to the early 20th century, the Finnish Spitz and the Karelo-Finnish Laika were considered one breed and were common across the Karelia region of eastern Finland and north-western Russia. The events of the Russian Revolution, the Russian Civil War and the Winter War saw large parts of Karelia occupied by Soviet Russia and much bitterness on both sides of the border, Russian advocates of the breed slightly altered the breed by way of selective breeding and renamed the dogs on their side of the border the Karelo-Finnish Laika. In the 1950s, Russian breeders imported 2 male and 1 female Finnish Spitz dogs and crossed them with the red-coated spitzes found in southern Karelia - the Olonets Laika and the Karelian Laika. These dogs had a conformation very similar to the Finnish Spitz and proved good at hunting. Later, other Russian breeders would import Finnish Spitzes for further crossings. The offspring fell into two classes - hunters would be rebred for hunting, and the non-hunters would be kept for show dogs. Whilst a popular breed of hunting dog in its home region, it is virtually unknown to the outside world and is not recognised as an independent breed by any kennel club.

== Description ==
Since the renaming of the Karelo-Finnish Laika there has been a very slight divergence from the Finnish Spitz, whilst the Finnish Spitz is only solid red in colour, the Karelo-Finnish Laika can also be fawn or black and can have white markings on the head, chest, legs and tail. The breed has a very fox-like head, a heavy protective coat and a distinctive spitz curled tail, it is described as cheerful, energetic and always eager to please its human handlers.

The breed is used by local hunters to hunt a variety of game including grouse, pheasant, duck, squirrel, hare, fox, marten and bear; it is said to be an extremely enthusiastic hunter capable of working in deep snow.

== See also ==
- List of dog breeds
