= Norwegian Buhund =

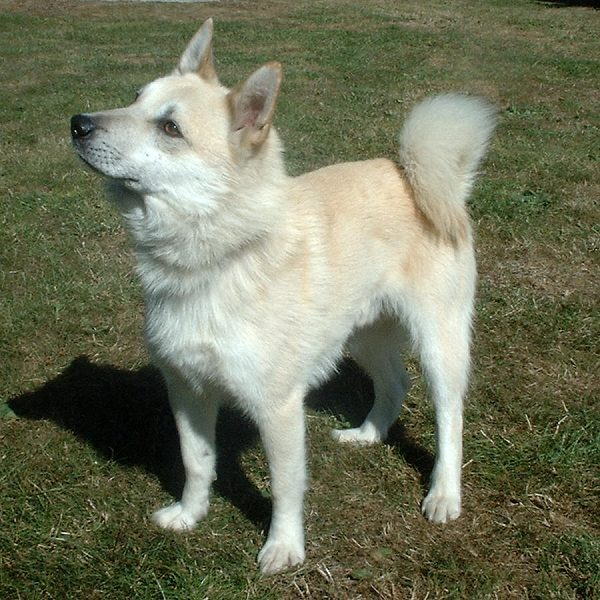
- A wheaten Norwegian Buhund.
- Other names: Norsk Buhund; Norwegian Sheepdog
- Origin: Norway
Kennel club standards
- Fédération Cynologique Internationale: standard

The Norwegian Buhund (Norwegian: Norsk buhund) is a breed of dog of the spitz type. It is closely related to the Icelandic Sheepdog and the Jämthund. The Buhund is used as a watch dog and an all purpose farm and herding dog.

== Description ==
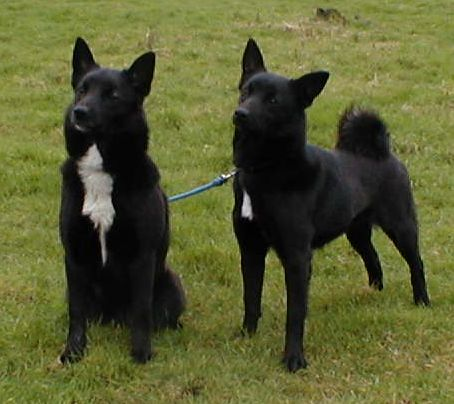
Two black Buhund.

=== General appearance ===
The Norwegian Buhund has a square profile, is a little under medium-sized and sports a high set, tightly curled tail carried over the center of the back. The head is wedge shaped with pricked ears and a black nose. Their back is level with a deep chest.

=== Measurements ===
The Buhund ranges in size from about 43 to 45 centimeter (17 to 18 inches) with the males being 43–46 cm (17-18 1/2 in) and females to 44 cm(17 1/2 in) high. The weight range is 14–18 kg (31–40 pounds) for males and 12–16 kg (26–35 pounds) for females.

=== Coat ===
Wheaten – Any shade from pale cream to bright orange, with or without dark tipped hairs; as little white as possible; black mask acceptable. Black – Preferably without too much bronzing; with as little white as possible. Areas where white is permissible: a narrow white ring around the neck, a narrow blaze on the face, a small patch of white hairs on the chest, white feet and tip of the tail. Gray dogs with coats similar to the Norwegian Elkhound are sometimes found. In the UK Wolf Sable is also listed in the Kennel Club Breed Standard.

=== Temperament ===
The Norwegian Buhund is a highly cheerful and active breed. They do not tire easily and require extensive exercise on a daily basis. The Norwegian Buhund needs to expel its energy and becomes destructive and ill-mannered if ignored or made to stay still frequently. In conjunction with their high level of activity and energy, they are also extremely lovable and are known for their love of children. However, due to their high level of energy and need for intensive training, Norwegian Buhunds should always be supervised, especially around children and the elderly. This breed loves to cuddle and give kisses to their masters and families. They form strong bonds with their owners and therefore are natural watch dogs. This can result in aloof behavior and wariness or anxiety around strangers. New owners may find this problematic, since the Norwegian Buhund may bark at each new alarming noise or movement. They are communicative and brave, but rarely will snap or bite without provocation.

The Norwegian Buhund is highly intelligent. They are extremely headstrong and demonstrate an intense desire to be taught and to learn new things. If appropriate stimulus is not made available, the breed may resort to destructive or inappropriate behavior. The Buhund breed does become bored easily and is known to become restless. Daily exercise is required. This breed is ideal for owners who can dedicate time to exercise and training. With this desire for activity and learning combined with a high level of energy, the Norwegian Buhund makes an excellent agility dog. People who live active lifestyles, or are seeking a dog with which they can become involved in dog sports, will appreciate the personality of the Norwegian Buhund. It is also an ideal dog for people who are athletic and desire a dog to go running, hiking or biking with. This breed makes an excellent companion for a sports enthusiast.

=== Health ===
The Norwegian Buhund is prone to inherited eye issues and hip dysplasia.

=== Grooming ===
The Norwegian Buhund breed has a short to medium length coat that does not tangle or mat when shedding. Brushing weekly will be fine, but extra brushing is required when the dog is blowing coat twice a year.

== History ==
The Norwegian Buhund belongs to a large class of dogs called the Spitz type. There are many variations in size, coat and color among the Spitz breeds. These dogs protected farms and herded cattle and sheep.

=== Name origin ===
The name Buhund is derived from the Norwegian word bu 'homestead; simple building or mountain hut' (where the shepherd lived while looking after his herd in the summer) but can also mean 'stock', as in livestock, and hund 'dog'. The modern buhund was bred on the rainy western coastlands of Norway.

== See also ==
- List of dog breeds
