= Canine hip dysplasia =

Joint abnormality in dogs

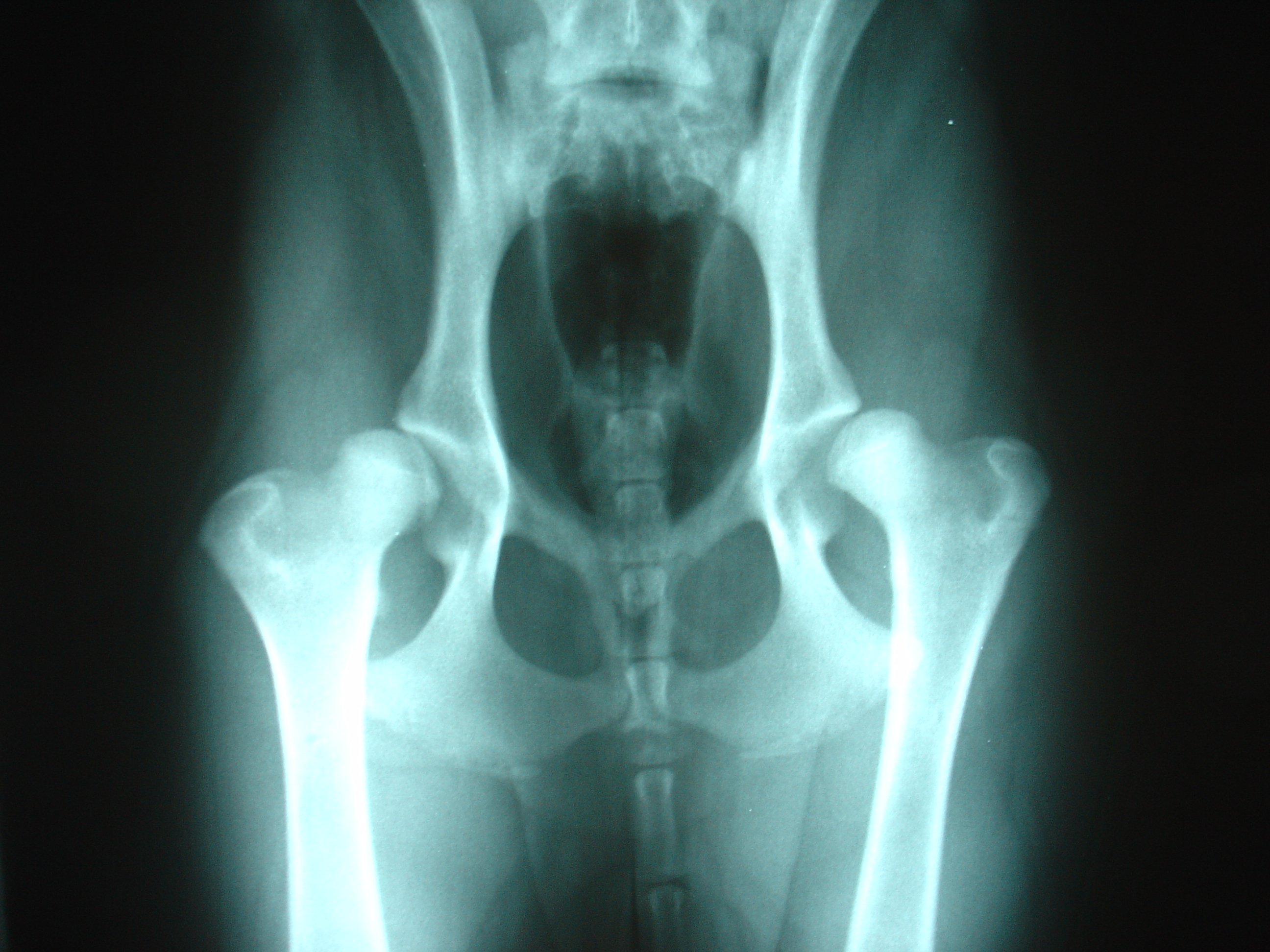
Hip dysplasia in a Labrador Retriever

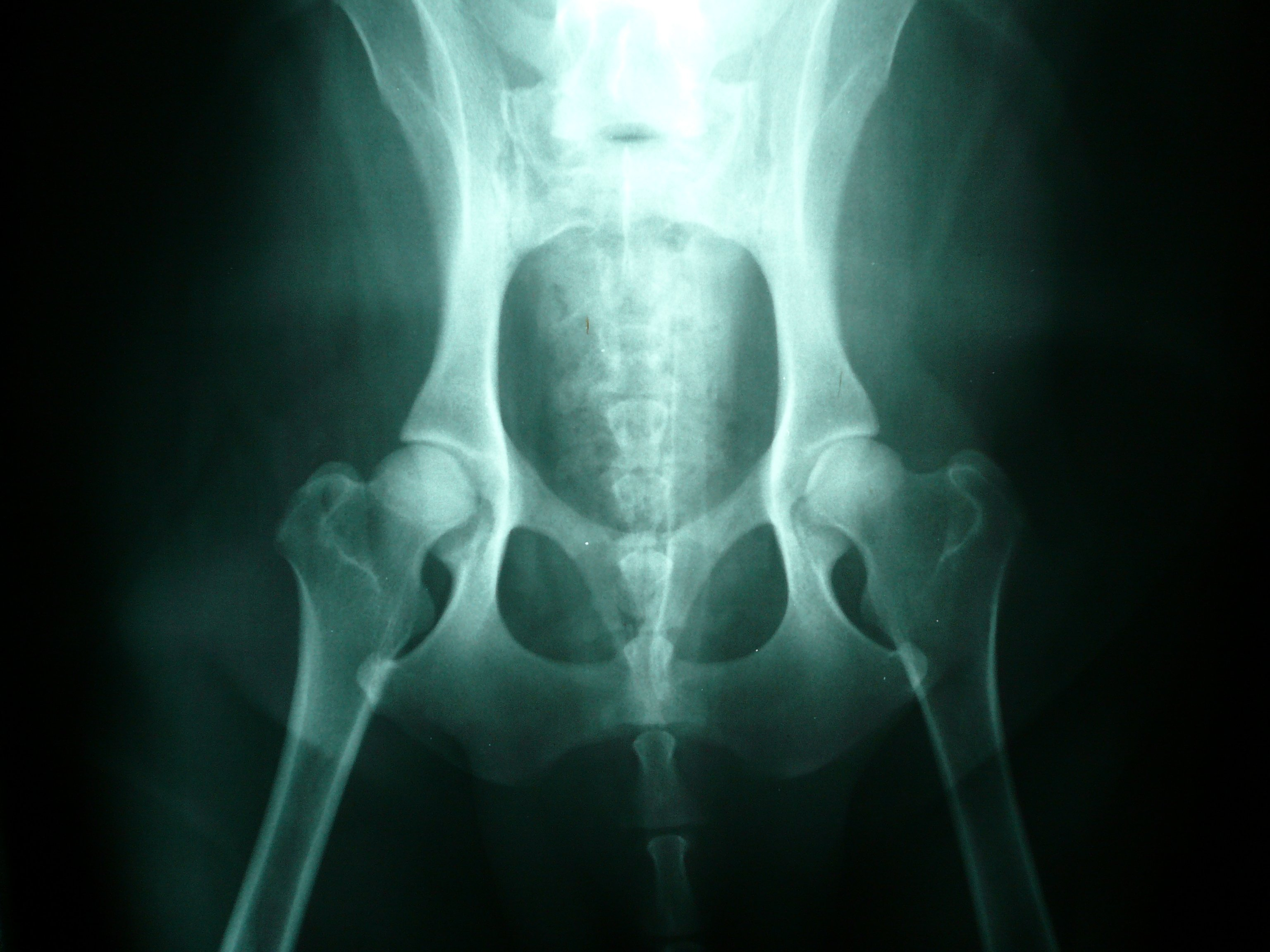
Normal hips, for comparison

In dogs, hip dysplasia is an abnormal formation of the hip socket that, in its more severe form, can eventually cause lameness and arthritis of the joints. It is a genetic (polygenic) trait that is affected by environmental factors. It is common in many dog breeds, particularly the larger breeds, and is the most common single cause of arthritis of the hips.

== Overview ==
=== Normal hip anatomy ===
In the normal anatomy of the hip joint, the almost spherical end of the femur head (the caput, or caput ossis femoris) fits into the acetabulum (a concave socket located in the pelvis). The bony surfaces of the femur head and of the acetabulum are covered by cartilage. While bones provide the strength necessary to support body weight, cartilage ensures a smooth fit and a wide range of motion. Normal hip function can be affected by congenital conditions such as dysplasia, trauma, and by acquired diseases such as osteoarthritis and rheumatoid arthritis.

=== Dysplastic hip anatomy ===
The hip could have major contractions from dysplasias. The caput is not deeply and tightly held by the acetabulum. Instead of being a snug fit, it is a loose fit, or a partial fit. Secondly, the caput or acetabulum are not smooth and round, but are misshapen, causing abnormal wear and tear or friction within the joint as it moves. The body reacts to this in several ways. First, the joint is continually repairing itself and laying down new cartilage. However, cartilage repair is a relatively slow process, the tissue being avascular, so the joint may suffer degradation due to the abnormal wear and tear, or may not support the body weight as intended. The joint becomes inflamed and a cycle of cartilage damage, inflammation and pain commences. This is a self-fueling process, in that the more the joint becomes damaged, the more damage it will cause to the surrounding tissues and bones. The inflammation also causes further damage. The bones of the joint may also develop osteoarthritis, visible on a radiograph as small outcrops of bone, which further degrade the joint. Osteoarthritis is a degenerative disease marked by the breakdown of cartilage between joints resulting in painful bone-to-bone contact.

The underlying deformity of the joint may get worse over time, or may remain static. A dog may have good radiographs and yet be in pain, or may have very poor radiographs and have no apparent pain issues. The hip condition is only one factor to determine the extent to which dysplasia is causing pain or affecting the quality of life. In mild to moderate dysplasia it is often the secondary effects of abnormal wear and tear or arthritis, rather than dysplasia itself, which is the direct causes of visible problems.

=== Causes and effects ===
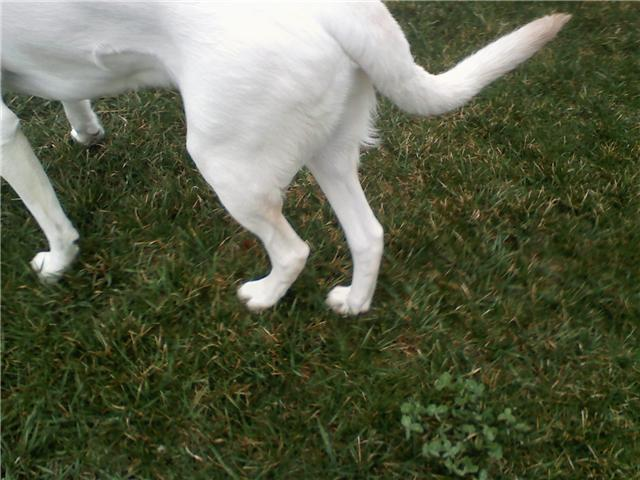
A Labrador Retriever standing with hind legs close together to compensate for hip dysplasia

Hip dysplasia may be caused by a femur that does not fit correctly into the pelvic socket, or poorly developed muscles in the pelvic area. Large and giant breeds are most susceptible to hip dysplasia (possibly due to the body mass index (BMI) of the individual animal), though many other breeds can suffer from it. The Orthopedic Foundation for Animals maintains a list of top 100 breeds affected.

To reduce pain, the animal will typically reduce its movement of that hip. This may be visible as "bunny hopping", where both legs move together, or less dynamic movement (running, jumping), or stiffness. Since the hip cannot move fully, the body compensates by adapting its use of the spine, often causing spinal, stifle (a dog's knee joint), or soft tissue problems to arise.

The causes of hip dysplasia are considered heritable, but new research conclusively suggests that environment also plays a role. To what degree the causality is genetic and what portion environmental is a topic of current debate. Neutering a dog, especially before the dog has reached an age of full developmental maturity, has been shown to almost double the chance he or she will develop hip dysplasia versus intact dogs or dogs that were neutered after reaching adulthood. Other environmental influences include overweight condition, injury at a young age, overexertion on the hip joint at a young age, ligament tear at a young age, or repetitive motion on forming joint (e.g. jogging with puppy under the age of 1 year). As current studies progress, greater information may help provide procedures to effectively reduce the occurrence of this condition.

It is most common in medium-large pure bred dogs, such as Newfoundlands, German Shepherds, retrievers (such as Labradors, Tollers, or Goldens), Rottweilers and Mastiffs, but also occurs in some smaller breeds such as spaniels and pugs.

== Clinical detection and testing ==
=== Symptoms ===
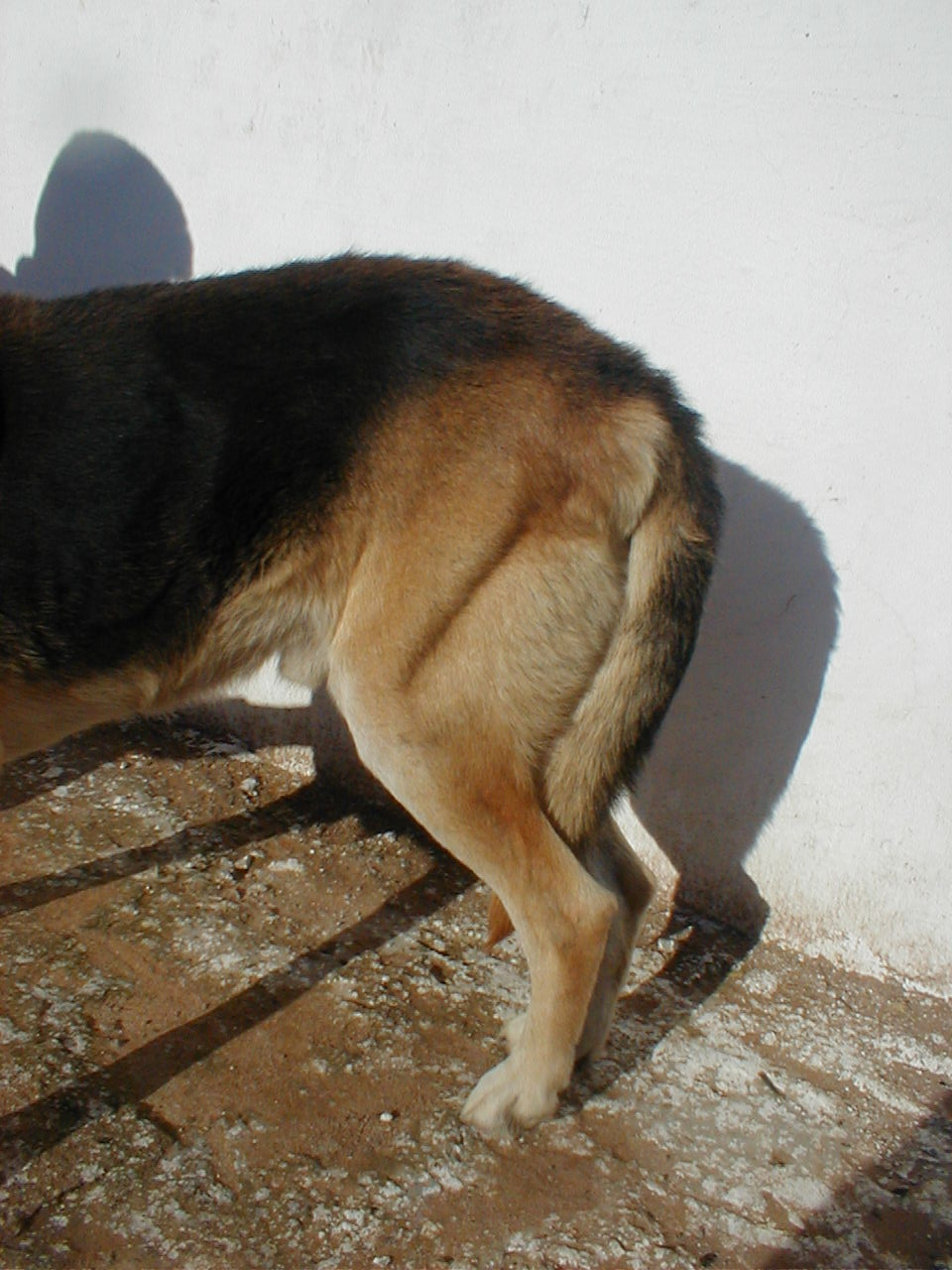
Atrophy of thigh muscle after a two-year evolution of hip dysplasia

Dogs with hip dysplasia may exhibit the following signs and symptoms:

- Decreased activity
- Decreased range of motion
- Difficulty or reluctance rising, jumping, running, or climbing stairs
- Lameness in the hind end
- Looseness in the joint
- Narrow stance
- Swaying, "bunny hopping" gait
- Grating in the joint during movement
- Loss of thigh muscle mass
- Noticeable enlargement of the shoulder muscles as they compensate for the hind end
- Pain
- Stiffness or soreness after rising from rest
- Subluxation or dislocation of the hip joint
- Caudolateral curvilinear osteophyte, sometimes called Morgan's line, a thickened osteophyte on the caudal aspect of the femoral neck

Affected dogs can show clinical signs as early as seven months of age, but most do not until one to two years of age. In part this is because the underlying hip problem may be mild or severe, worsening or stable, and the body may be more or less able to keep the joint in repair well enough to cope.

=== Diagnosis ===
Hip dysplasia is diagnosed with radiographs of the pelvis. It is also common to X-ray the spine and legs, as well as the hips, since soft tissues can be affected by the extra strain of a dysplastic hip, or there may be other undetected factors such as neurological issues (e.g. nerve damage) involved. Radiographs are usually taken with the dog sedated or anesthetized, and can be graded by the Orthopedic Foundation for Animals. Because joint laxity may not show on a standard hip-extended view, stress radiography such as the PennHIP method can be used to measure laxity and estimate the risk of later dysplasia and osteoarthritis. Clinical signs do not always match the radiographic findings.

=== Other conditions with similar symptoms ===
The following conditions can give symptoms very similar to hip dysplasia, and should be ruled out during diagnosis:

- Cauda equina syndrome (i.e. lower back problems)
- Cranial (anterior) Cruciate ligament tears
- Other rear limb arthritic conditions
- Osteochondritis dissecans and elbow dysplasia in the forelimbs are difficult to diagnose as the animal may only exhibit an unusual gait, and may be masked by, or misdiagnosed as, hip dysplasia.

A dog may misuse its rear legs, or adapt its gait, to compensate for pain in the forelimbs, notably osteoarthritis, osteochondritis (OCD) or shoulder or elbow dysplasia, as well as pain in the hocks and stifles or spinal issues. It is important to rule out other joint and bodily issues before concluding that only hip dysplasia is present. Even if some hip dysplasia is present, it is possible for other conditions to co-exist or be masked by it.

== Treatment ==
There is no complete cure, although there are many options to alleviate the clinical signs. The aim of treatment is to enhance quality of life.

Most dogs with hip dysplasia do not need surgery as they do very well with a home physical therapy program, keeping trim and strong, and using pain medication as needed.

If the problem cannot be controlled with medications, then often surgery is considered. There are traditionally two types of surgery - those which reshape the joint to reduce pain or help movement, and hip replacement which completely replaces the damaged hip with an artificial joint, similar to human hip replacements.

=== Non-surgical interventions ===
Non surgical intervention is dependent on many factors including age, weight, degree of hip laxity, lifestyle of the owner and their tolerance for the cost incurred for medication and physical therapy.

==== Maintenance of minimal body weight ====
Weight control is often "the single most important thing that we can do to help a dog with arthritis," and "reducing the dog's weight is enough to control all of the symptoms of arthritis in many dogs." With weight control, the goal is to prevent the dog from becoming overweight to reduce mechanical stresses applied to the hip joints. In general terms, the ribs should be easily palpated and there should be an indentation in front of the hip bones.

==== Exercise routine ====
Reasonable exercise stimulates cartilage growth and reduces degeneration, and also regular walks taken in the early stages of dysplasia can help prevent loss of muscle mass to the hips. Exercise should fit an individual dog's maximum intensity level with the goal to maintain muscle tone and cardiovascular function without causing pain, stiffness, and inflammation to the joint. Exercise also improves joint range of motion which in turn keeps the dog more comfortable. Swimming, because it is a non-weight bearing exercise, can be a very useful means of maintaining muscle tone and range of motion without placing concussive forces on the joint, though swimming is primarily a front-legged exercise.

==== Medication ====
Medication can reduce pain and discomfort, and also reduce damaging inflammation. Most often, medication consists of a non-steroidal anti-inflammatory drug (NSAID), which doubles as an anti-inflammatory and painkiller. Typical NSAIDs used for hip dysplasia include carprofen and meloxicam (often sold as Rimadyl and Metacam respectively). Both are used to treat arthritis resulting from dysplasia, although other NSAIDs such as tepoxalin (Zubrin) and prednoleucotropin ("PLT", a combination of cinchophen and prednisolone) are sometimes prescribed.

==== Diet supplementation ====
Incorporating omega-3 fatty acids such as docosahexaenoic acid (DHA) and eicosapentaenoic acid (EPA) into the diet can result in improved symptoms of the disease. Omega-3 fatty acids can help decrease inflammation that occurs from osteoarthritis, as well as improve the locomotion of dogs who have the disease. EPA and DHA can be supplemented into the diet through fish oils.

Glucosamine and chondroitin sulfate are nutraceuticals that can also be added into the diet to help treat osteoarthritis caused by hip dysplasia. Both nutraceuticals help with improvement of cartilage, joint health and repairing of tissues. A glucosamine-based nutritional supplement may give the body additional raw materials used in joint repair. Glucosamine can take 3–4 weeks to start showing its effects, so the trial period for medication is usually at least 3–5 weeks. In vitro, glucosamine has been shown to have negative effects on cartilage cells.

Another nutrient that can help improve the structural support of the body is vitamin C. Vitamin C contributes to the building blocks of collagen that can help to strengthen the joints.

=== Surgical interventions ===
Surgical procedures attempt to modify, repair, or replace the hip joint in order to allow pain-free usage.

- Femoral head ostectomy (FHO) is when the head of the femur is removed but not replaced. Instead, the resulting scar tissue from the operation takes the place of the hip joint. This false joint is less stable with a reduced range of motion than a normal joint, causing an abnormal gait. Nevertheless, pain relief with adequate function can be achieved. The procedure can be performed in all dogs of all sizes, but there are usually better long-term success rates in smaller dogs less than 20 kg (44 lbs). This procedure is used when there is significant osteoarthritis and a total hip replacement is cost-prohibitive.
- Triple pelvic osteotomy (TPO) involves bone cuts in the pelvis so that the socket portion of the joint can be rotated over the ball; the bones are then stabilized with a bone plate. This procedure is indicated for dogs under 10 months of age. A TPO can be performed to reestablish joint stability and encourage normal joint development. This procedure is not indicated if osteoarthritis is already present. Recovery time is about six weeks.
- Hip replacement has the highest rate of success, especially in severe cases, since it completely replaces the faulty joint. It usually restores complete mobility if no other joint is affected, and also completely prevents recurrence. It is ideal for dogs over 10 months old that already have established osteoarthritis and can no longer be medically managed. Hip replacement is also the preferred clinical option for serious dysplasia in animals that weigh 40–60 lb (18–27 kg).
- Juvenile pubic symphysiodesis (JPS) is a procedure for very young dogs that manipulates the way the pelvis grows to create a tighter hip. It involves cauterizing the growth plates of the pelvis to halt vertical growth. To compensate, the rest of the pelvis grows outward, in a manner which enhances the "socket" of the hip and provides better support than the dog would have had naturally. Since it relies on growth in puppyhood, it has a very tight window for surgery – between 4 and 5 months old. This is compatible with hip scoring of puppies at 4 months.
- Capsular neurectomy is a procedure in which the hip joint capsule is de-nerved to reduce pain in the hip. This allows the dog to exercise moderately with less pain, thus preventing the leg muscles from weakening from disuse and providing less support to the bad joint. Both hips can be done in one surgery. This surgery should not prevent a future hip replacement if a more complete fix is desired.

== See also ==
- Dislocation of hip in animals
