= Indian pariah dog =

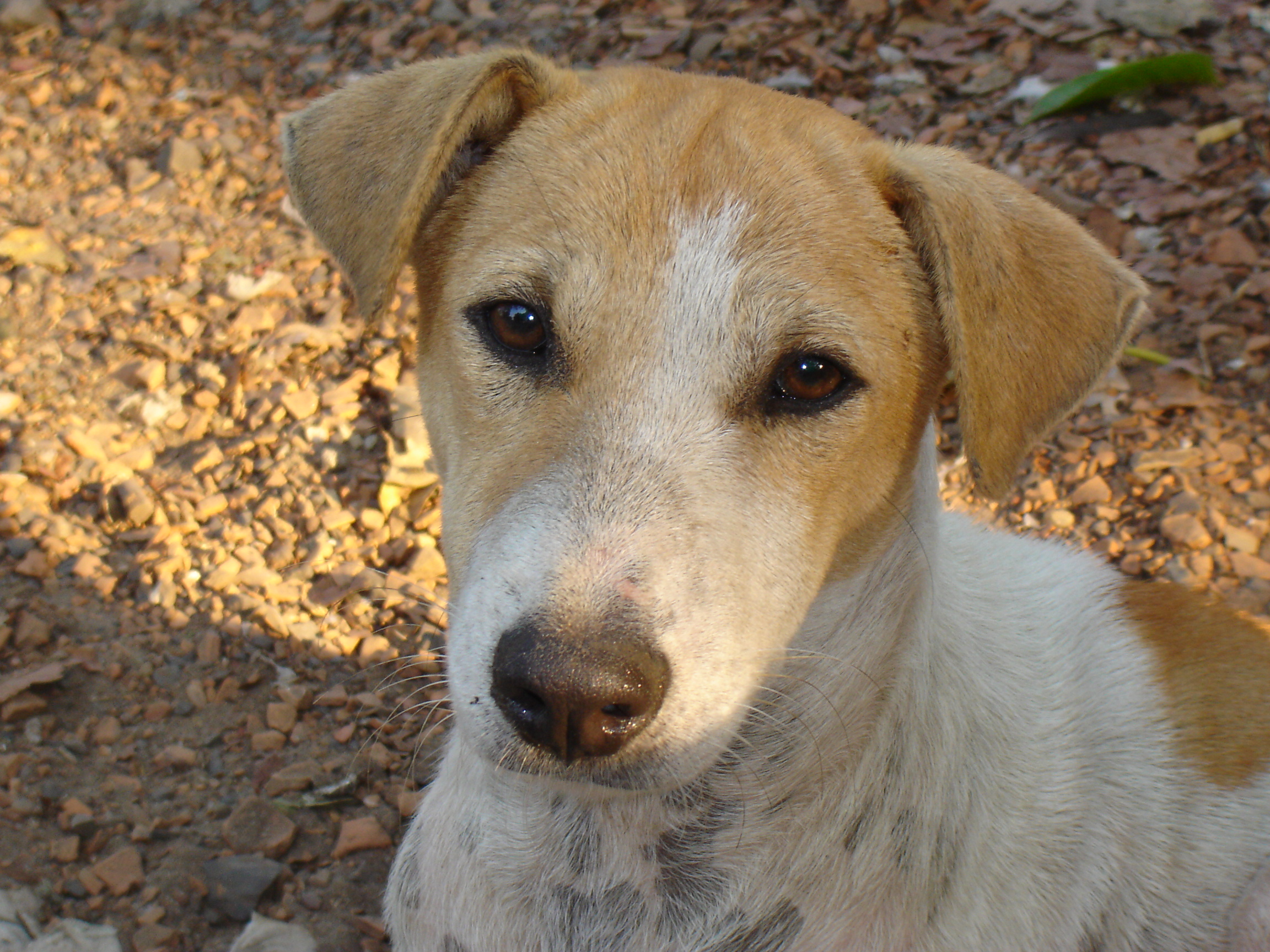
- South Asian pariah dog photographed in Howrah, India (2004)
- Common nicknames: South Asian pariah dog Pye-dog; INDog; Desi dog Neri Kutta
- Origin: Indian subcontinent
Traits
| Height | Males | 20–25 in (51–64 cm) |
| | Females | 18–23 in (46–58 cm) |
| Weight | Males | 20–30 kg (44–66 lb) |
| | Females | 15–25 kg (33–55 lb) |
- Coat: Short
- Colour: solid fawn, pied (fawn/black & white), black (rare)
Kennel club standards
- Kennel Club of India: standard

The Indian pariah dog, South Asian pariah dog, or Desi Kutta, is a landrace of dog native to the Indian subcontinent. (Note: For other names of the South Asian pariah dog, see the section of this article titled Names.) They have erect ears, a wedge-shaped head, and a curved tail. It is easily trainable and often used as a guard dog and police dog. This dog is an example of an ancient group of dog known as pye-dogs. There is archaeological evidence that the dog was present in ancient Indian villages as early as 4,500 years ago.

Though most street dogs in the Indian subcontinent are in fact Indian pye-dogs, the names for this breed are often erroneously used to refer to all urban South Asian stray dogs despite the fact that some free-ranging dogs in the Indian subcontinent do not match the "pariah type" and may not be pure indigenous dogs but mixed breeds, especially around locations where European colonists historically settled in India, due to admixtures with European dog breeds.

== Appearance ==
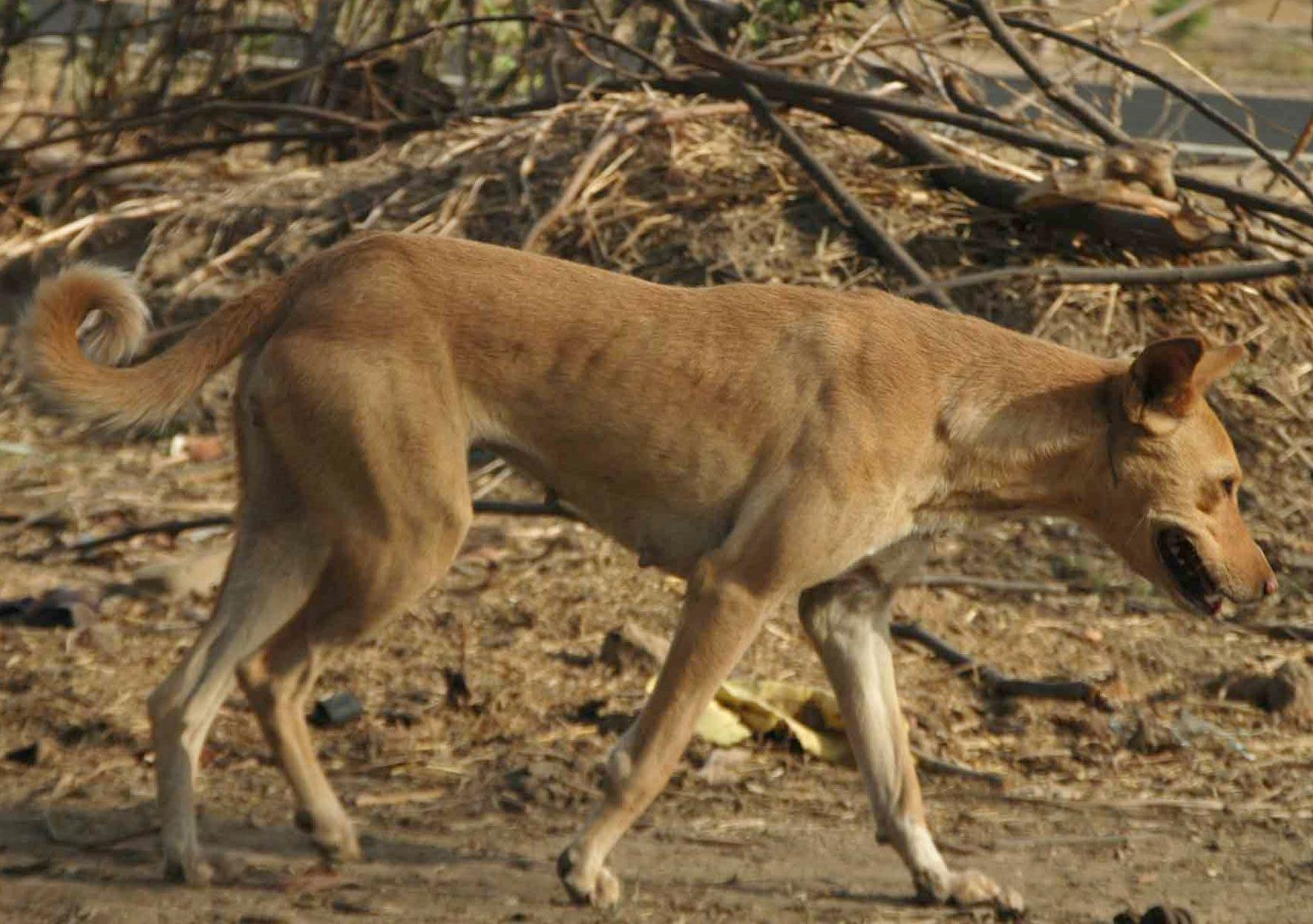
A typical Indian pariah dog

The Indian pariah dog is a medium-sized dog of square to slightly rectangular build and short coat. The dog has a double coat, a coarse upper coat, and a soft undercoat. The most commonly observed colours are browns, ranging from dark to reddish-brown, with or without white markings. Solid blacks are rare, but some dogs are pied. Shaded coats, brindles, solid white and dalmatian-type spotting are never seen in pure populations. These may be a sign of mixing with modern breeds, as they are only seen in dogs in cities and other sites where non-native dogs have been introduced.

The head is medium-sized and wedge-shaped. The muzzle is pointed and is of equal or slightly greater length than the head. The neck is noble and the forequarters are erect. Hindquarters are minimally angled. The trot is short. The eyes are almond-shaped and dark brown in colour. The ears are held erect and are pointed at the tips, with a broad base, set low on the head, and the tail is curled and held high when excited.

== Names ==
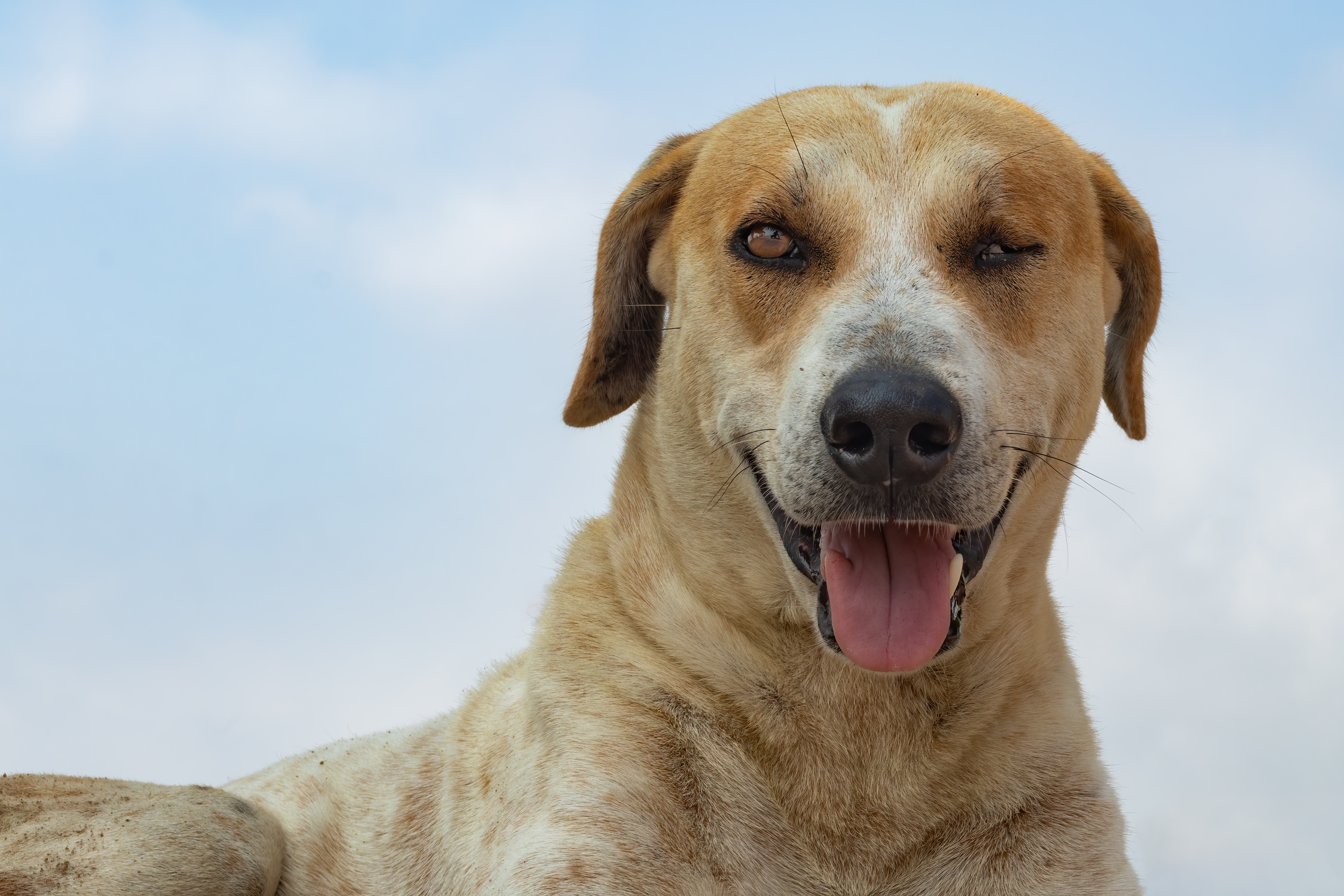
An Indian Pariah Dog who is a mix of brown and white colouring

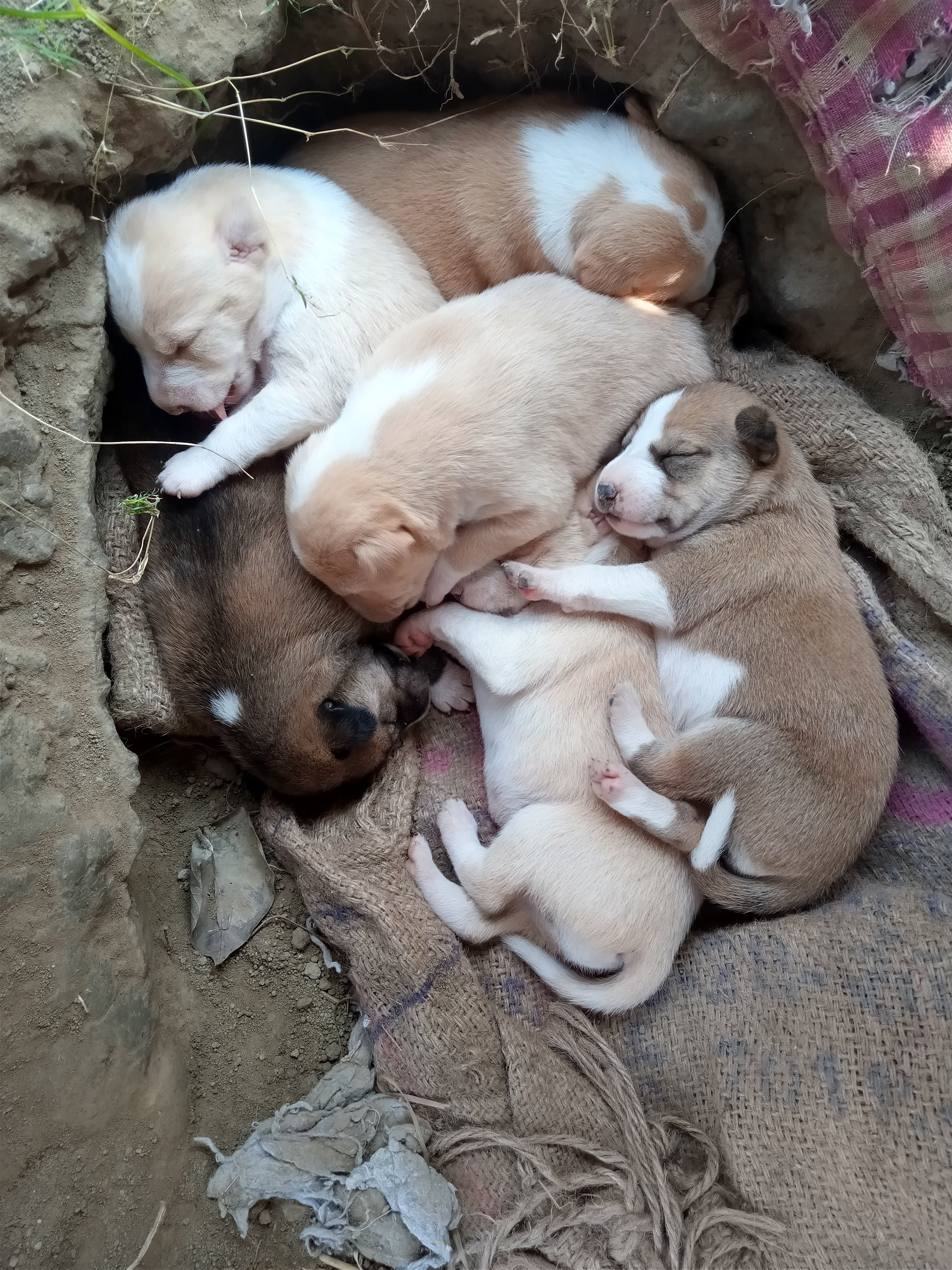
Newborn puppies, just a few hours old, from a single litter

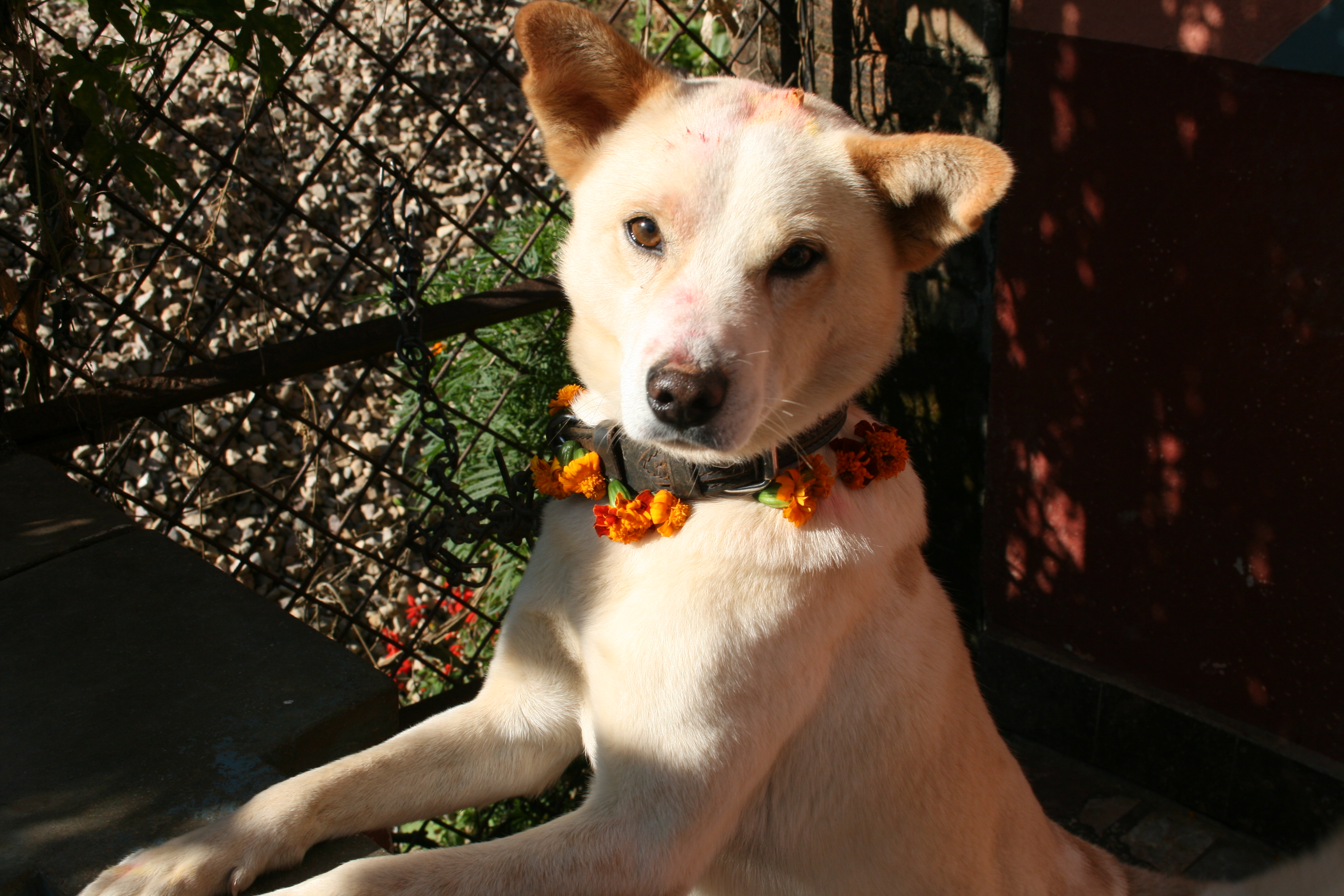
Kukur Tihar is an annual Hindu festival where people pay homage to stray dogs and feed them

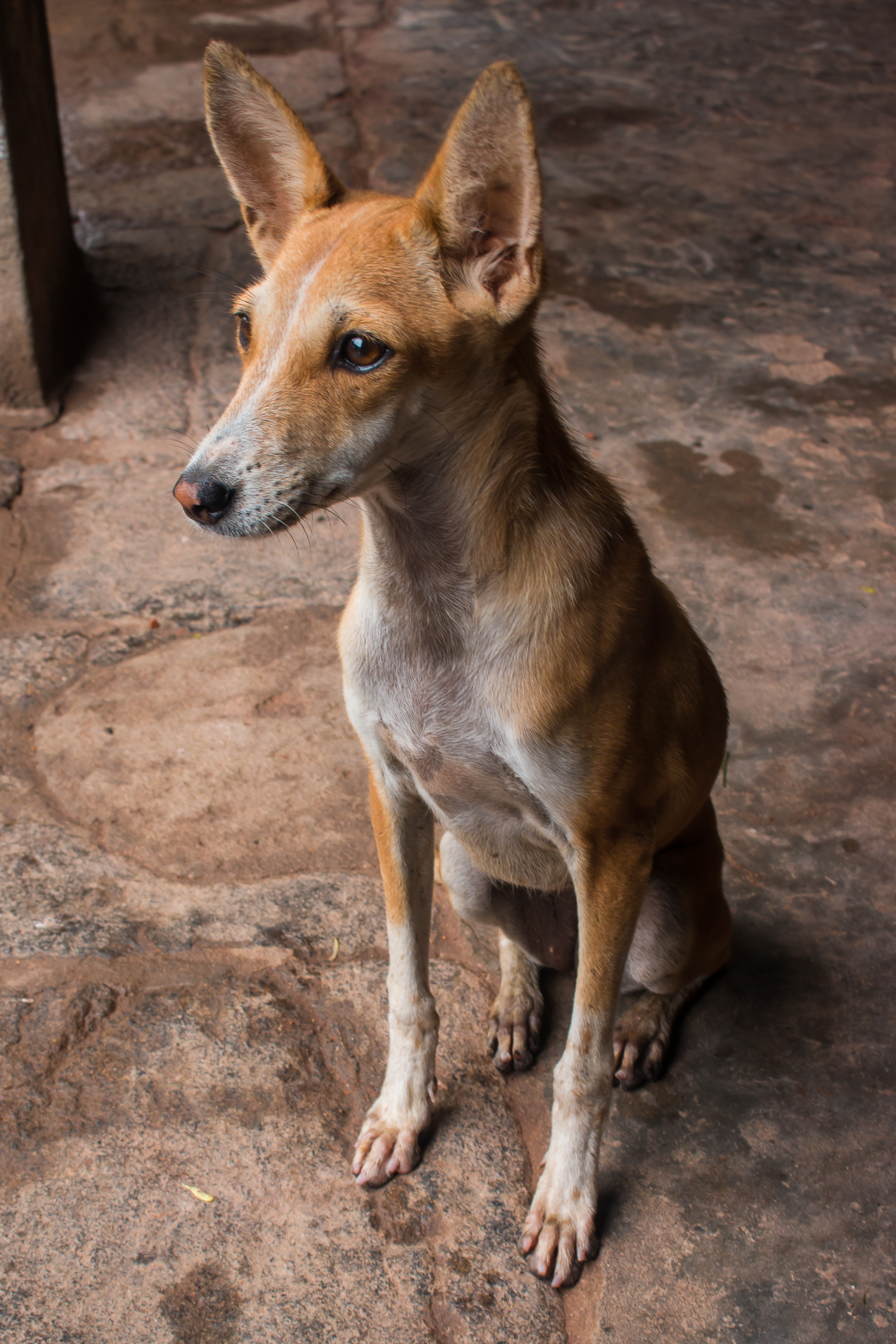
Indian pye-dogs have been used as guard dogs for centuries

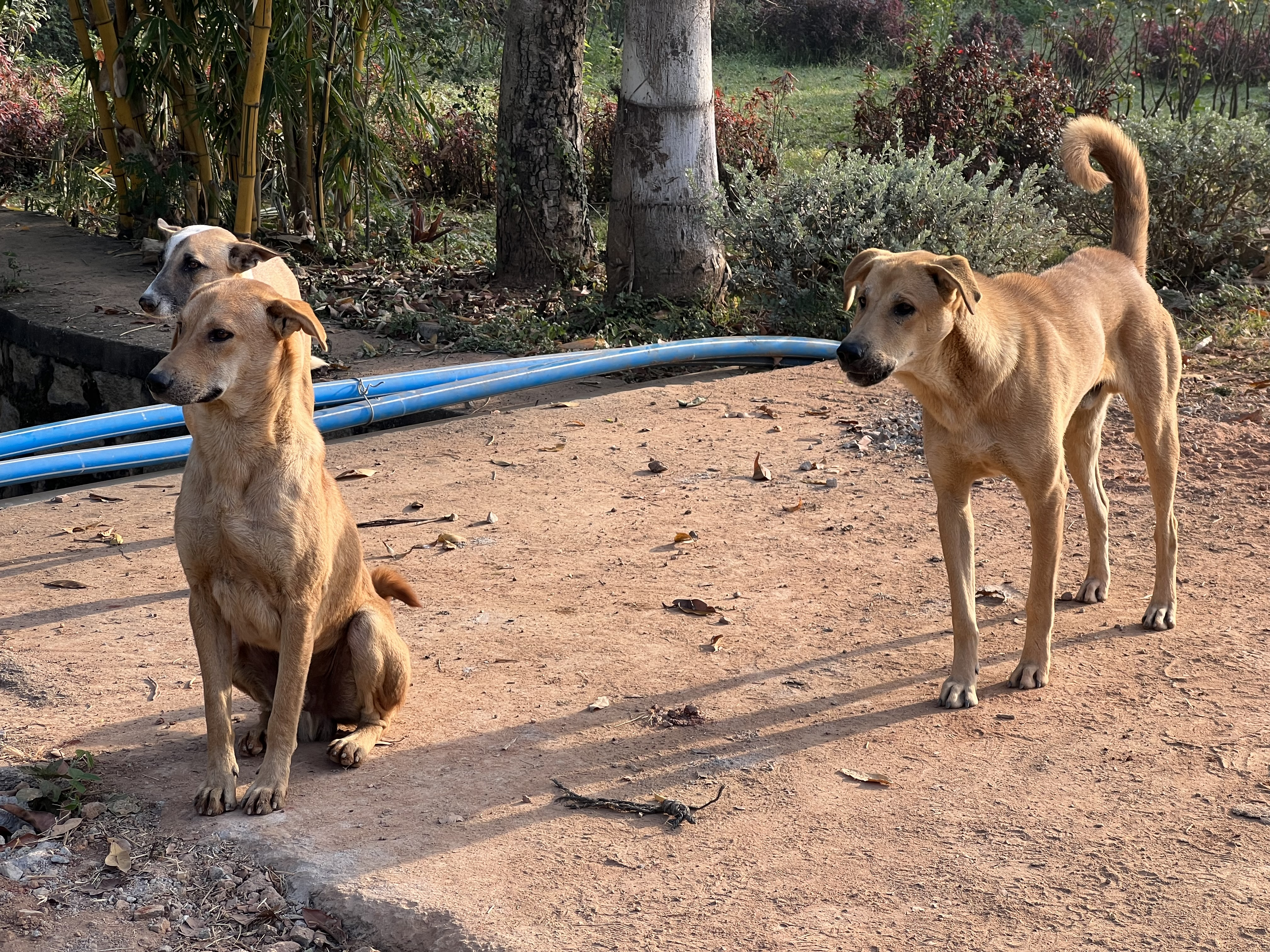
Pariah dogs in a city park in Yelahanka, Bengaluru, India. They are alert to the presence of an unfamiliar pariah dog from outside the park.

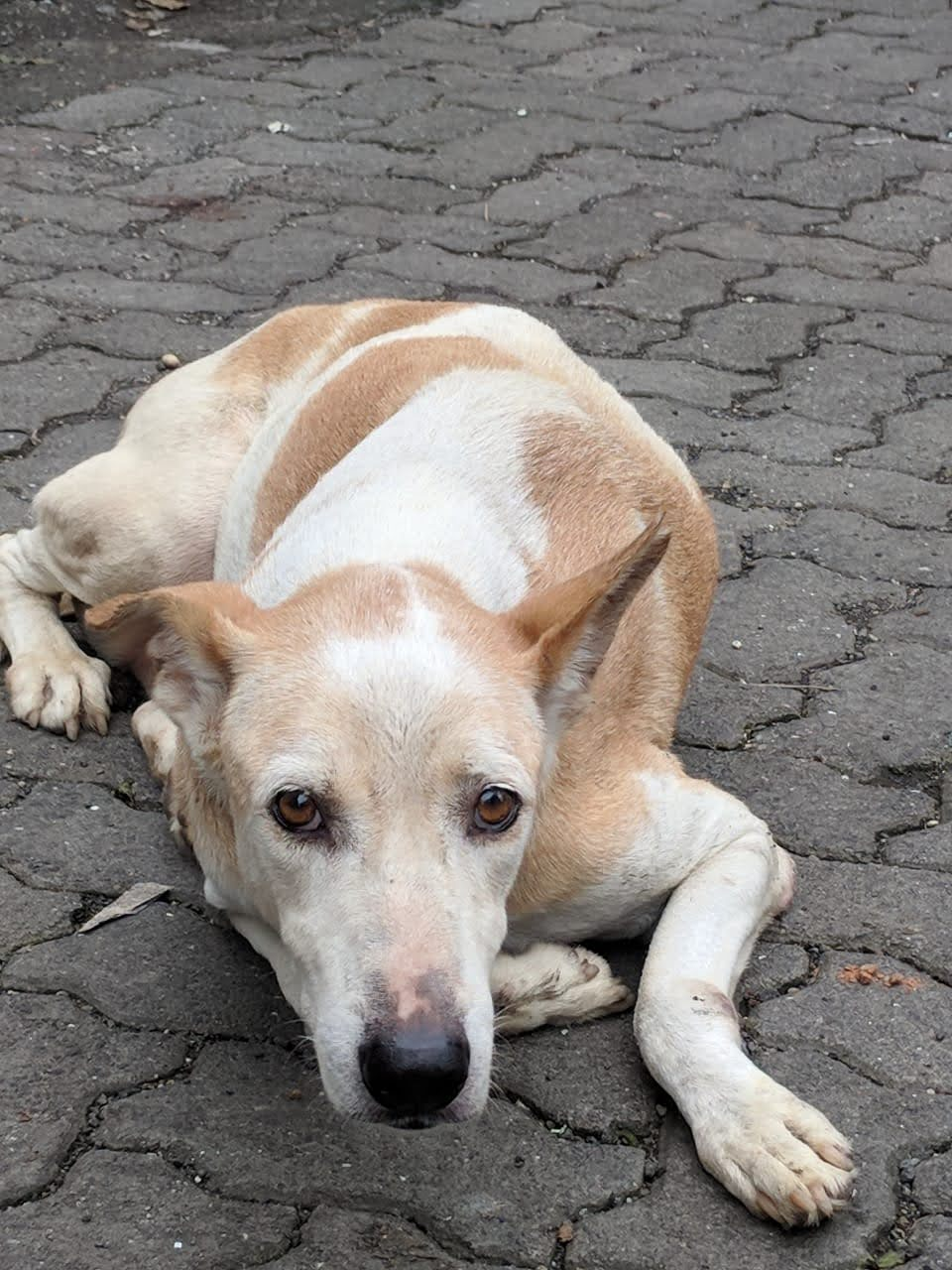
Indian Pariah Dog on the streets of Mumbai, India

The namesake of this breed was given during the British Raj in India after the Pariah tribe of the Madras Presidency. From the Anglo-Indian word pye or paë and Hindi pāhī meaning 'outsider', the Indian pariah dog is sometimes referred to as the pye-dog (also spelt pie or pi) and the Indian native dog. It is popularly known as Desi Kutta or Desi Dog (which derives from the Hindi-Urdu words desi, meaning native, and kutta, meaning dog), as well as the Indi-dog or In-dog (in various spellings). It was referred to in the works of Rudyard Kipling as the "yellow pariah dog".

In India and Pakistan, pariah dogs are known in Hindi-Urdu as desi kutta, and in various parts of the Indian subcontinent, regional names include nadan patti, nedi kukur, deshi kukur, deshiya naayi, deshi kutra, theruvu naai, theru naai, deshi kukura, veedhi kukka, beedi naayi and deshi kutro. They are also referred to as INDogs or Indie dogs. Many kennel clubs use the term primitive dog to describe dogs of the South Asian pariah type, reflecting their close resemblance to early domesticated dogs. The Primitive and Aboriginal Dogs Society (PADS) reclassifies pariah dogs as INDogs and categorizes them as a subgroup of primitive and aboriginal dogs.

== History ==
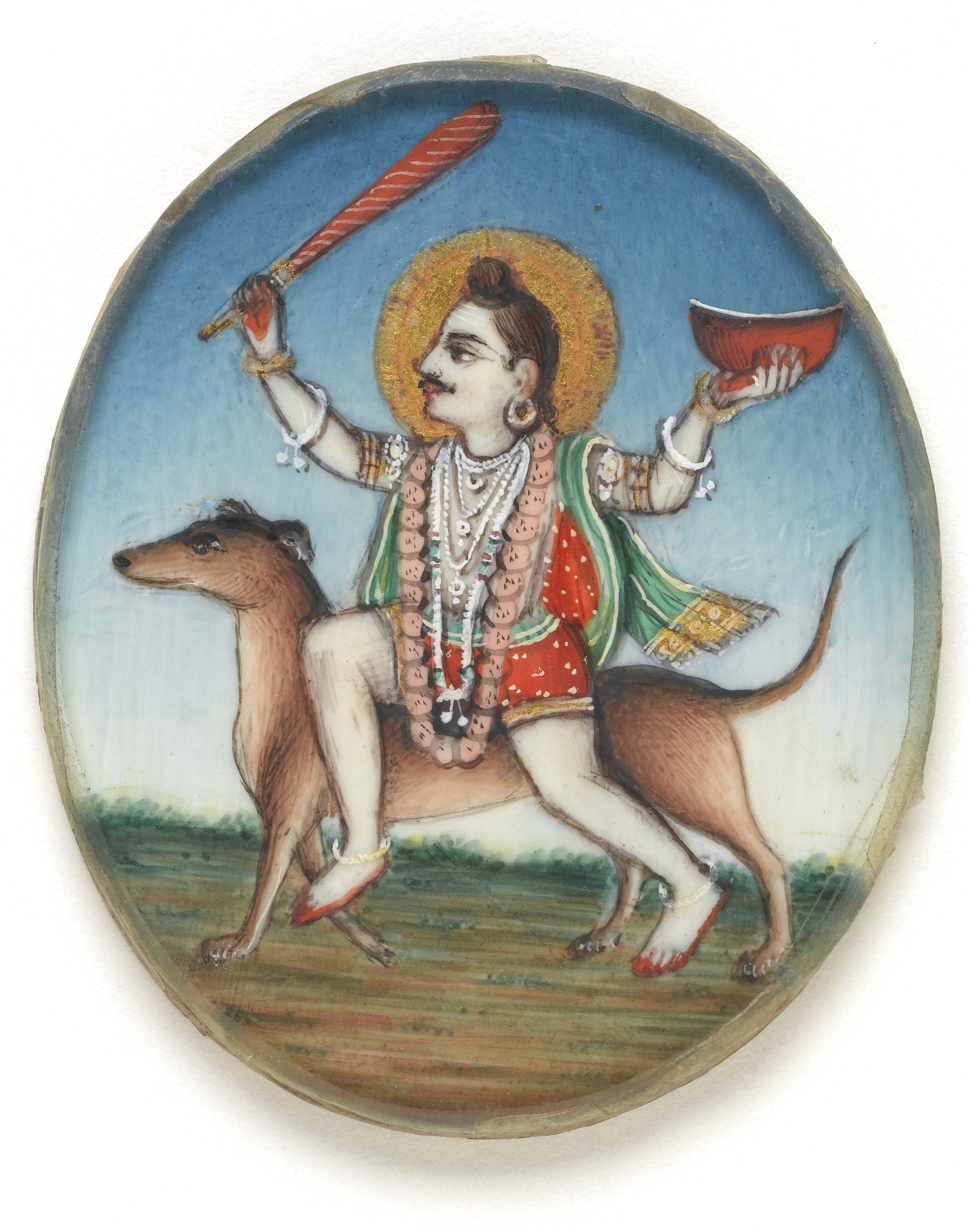
Early modern North Indian depiction of Bhairava riding on his vahana, the dog, whose appearance is based on the Indian pye-dog

The pariah dog of India is an ancient autochthonous landrace that is found all over India, Pakistan, Bangladesh, Afghanistan, Nepal, Sri Lanka and even beyond South Asia. A pariah-like dog skull was discovered in the Harappan site of Mohenjo-daro, and prehistoric rock art depicting a dog of similar type has been found in the Bhimbetka rock shelters. It was featured on National Geographic Channel's film, Search for the First Dog along with the other ancient types, such as the Canaan Dog of The Levant and the Australian dingo.

The Indian pye-dog was introduced to the Andaman Islands with the establishment of a penal colony there, dogs having been previously unknown to the native Andamanese.

Despite the Indian pariah dog being highly intelligent and easily trainable, the breed was intentionally downplayed during the British Raj by merchants who wished to sell their foreign breeds within the country. Their popularity in the West in recent years, however, has resulted in hundreds of dogs being exported out of the Indian subcontinent.

In 2015, a breed standard was published in the Indian Kennel Gazette, the publication of Kennel Club of India, and the dog has been recognized by the Primitive and Aboriginal Dog Society (PADS), a worldwide grouping of enthusiasts based in the US.

Some in the society view these dogs as a risk citing their increasing population in India in recent years. They consider these dogs as menace and nuisance owing to constant barking and biting people. The numbers of dog bites and deaths due to dog attacks are increasing every year. Since these dogs are largely not vaccinated, they frequently carry rabies. Only a few island territories of India, e.g. Andaman and Nicobar Islands are rabies free despite having pariah dog populations. Indian pariah dogs are one of the oldest dog breeds in existence today.

== Temperament ==
Indian pariah dogs are very alert and social. They are used as guard dogs and police dogs, being very territorial and defensive. They need good socializing as pups and do well with families and children if provided with such socialization. They are highly intelligent and easily trainable; to this end, veterinarian Premlata Choudhary stated that "desi dogs are much more intelligent and hardy than most pedigreed dogs that people spend so much money on."

== Health ==
Being a naturally evolved breed, they have very few health concerns and thrive with minimal maintenance in suitable climates. The skin needs very little grooming and the dogs themselves are relatively clean. They have little body odour. Genetic health ailments like hip dysplasia are extremely rare, since there is no inbreeding and the dominant genes that aid their survival are naturally selected over time. Most of their deaths occur due to accidents on the roads and railway tracks, starvation, drinking polluted water, tumors in the body, snakebites, or harm from humans.

== Gallery ==
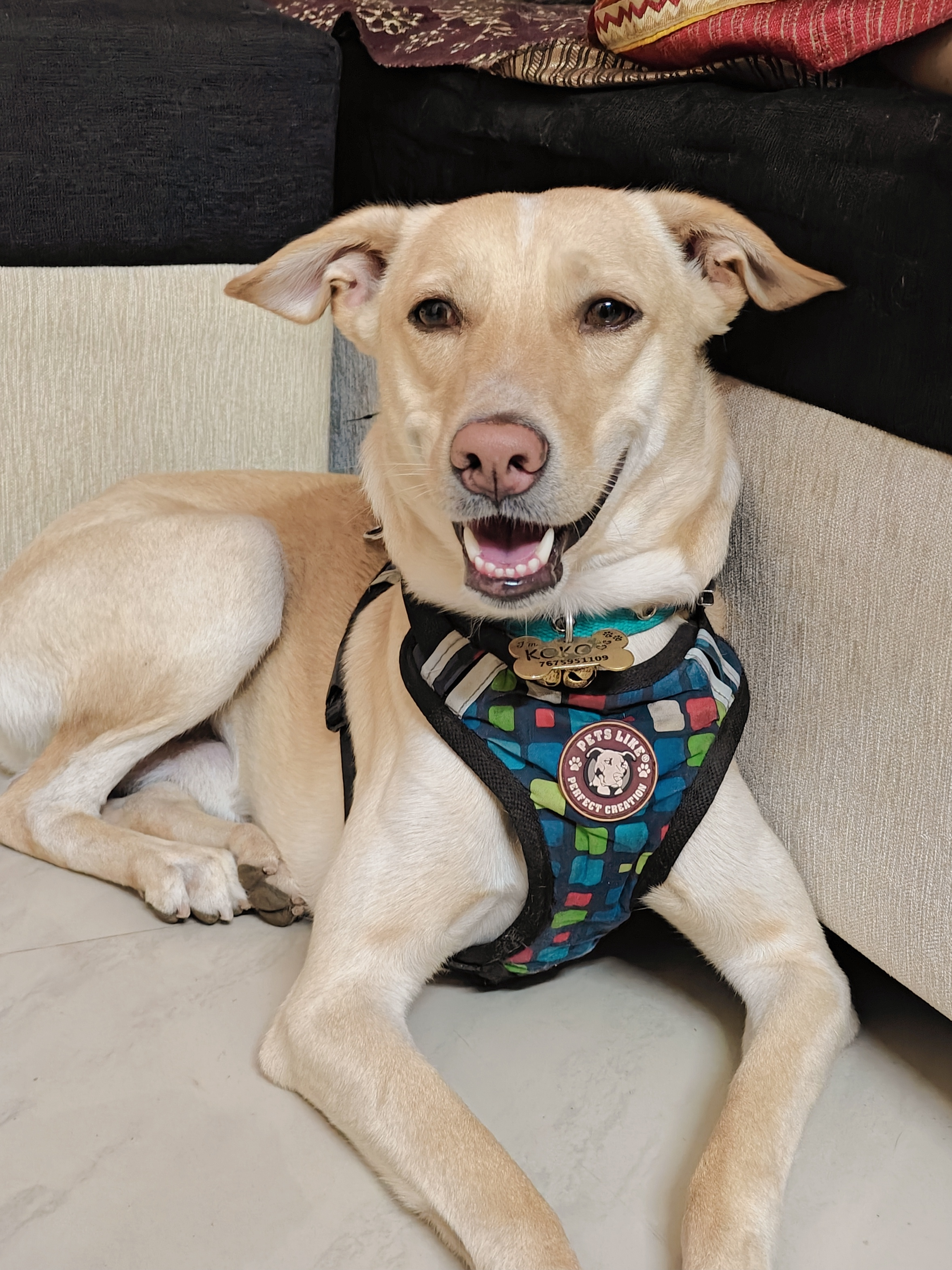
Domesticated Indie dog

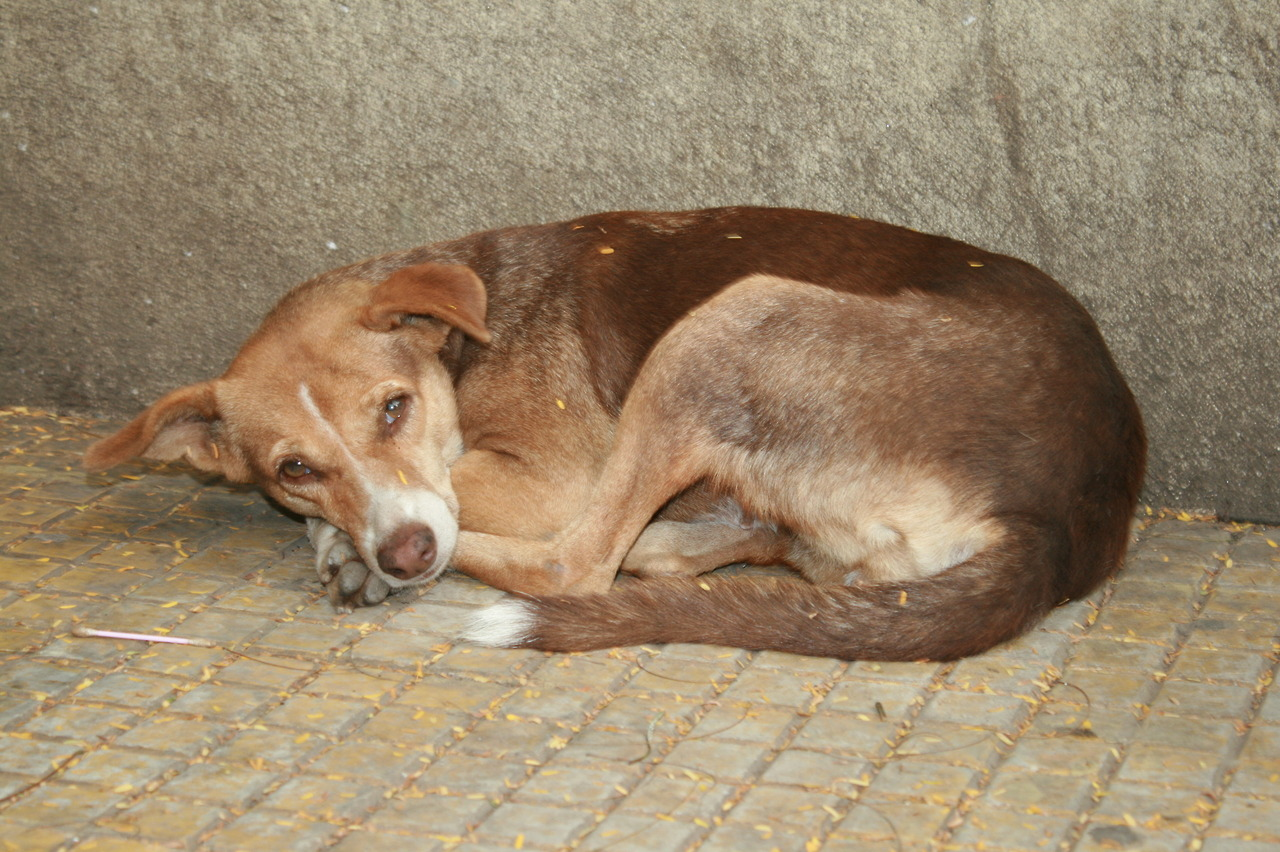
Stray pariah dog in India

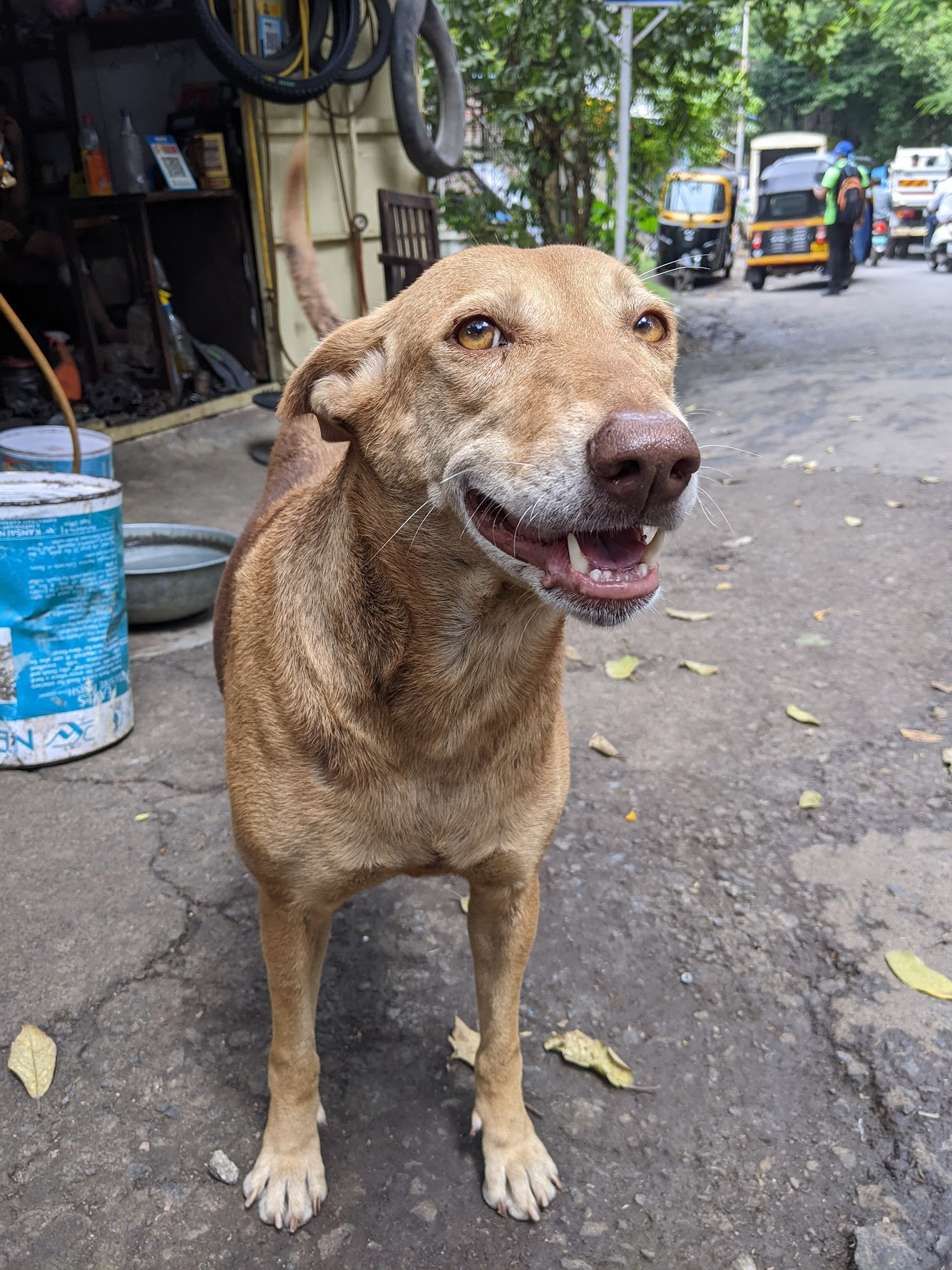
Pariah dog

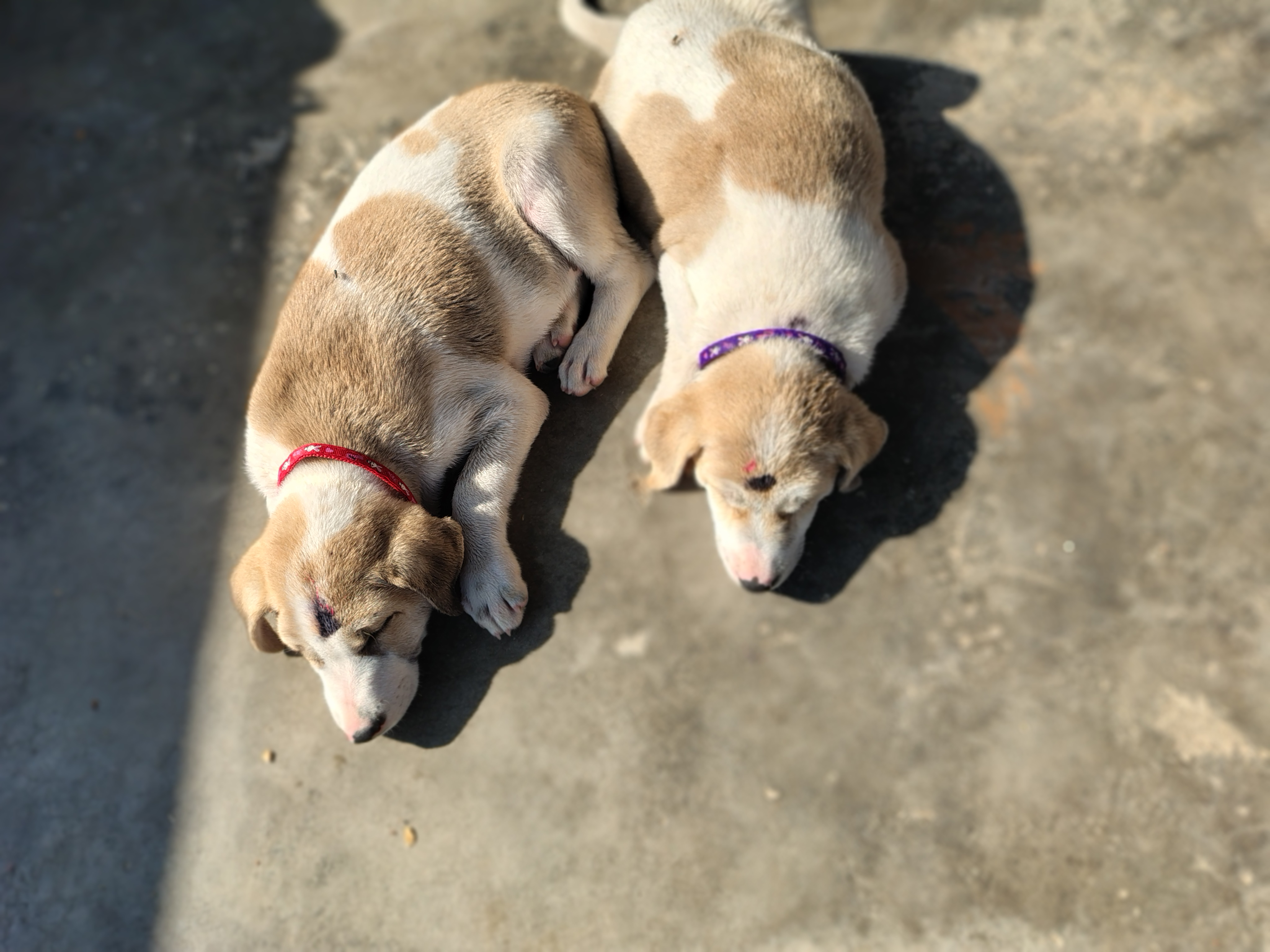
Puppies

== See also ==
- List of dog breeds
- List of dog breeds from India
- Telomian
- Sinhala Hound
- Aloka (dog)
- Stray cow
- Bombay Dog Riots
