= Paul de Vos (immunologist) =

Dutch scientist in immunology

Prof. Dr. Paul de Vos
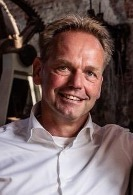
- Prof. Dr. Paul de Vos 2023
- Born: 10 August 1969; Rotterdam, Netherlands
- Education: University of Groningen
- Scientific career
- Fields: Immunology
- Workplaces: University of Groningen

Paul de Vos (born 10 August 1969) is a Dutch scientist in immunology. He is a full professor at Maastricht University's Faculty of Science and Engineering and chair of the Sustainable Foods and Health group at Campus Venlo. He previously served as a professor at the University of Groningen.

== Career ==
De Vos's research is strongly focused on biomedical application of carbohydrates and their effects on immunity and metabolism. His research findings are applied to improve biomaterials for application in bioartificial organs and to influence immunity in consumers of carbohydrates. Since 1996 he has been active in several lines of research related to diabetes. De Vos is the recipient of several scientific awards such as the Gerritzen award, the Novo Nordisk Award and the Procter & Gamble Poncelet Award. Since 2015 his research has also focused on how specific dietary molecules such as carbohydrate structures can improve health. These molecules can contribute to health by stimulating gut microbiota but also by directly interacting with immune receptors in the gut. De Vos is the principal discoverer of this last mechanism which is now the basis of many functional foods. He has published more than 300 peer-reviewed scientific papers.

De Vos is the principal investigator and project leader in the Carbohydrate Competence Center (CCC), Fascinating and the juvenile diabetes research foundation (JDRF) funded "encapsulation consortium".

In addition to being a scientist, de Vos is a well-known kynologist, dog-handler and trainer and writer of three Dutch books about welfare and training of gundogs. The books are titled: Wat een jachthond moet weten, Apporteren, and Emoties bij honden. In addition, he has been a publicist on gundog training and welfare for several Dutch journals.
