= Rudolphina Menzel =

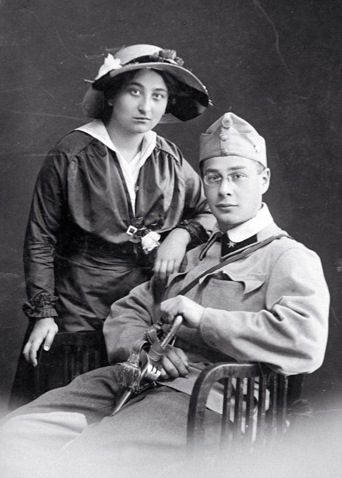
Rudolph and Rudolphina Menzel, 1914

Rudolphina Menzel (1 March 1891 – 7 May 1973) was a cynologist, best known for her work in the field of animal behavior, from Vienna, Austria. She was responsible for gaining recognition for the Canaan Dog; and she wrote the breed standard, which was accepted by the FCI in 1966.

== Early life ==
Rudolphina Menzel was born in Vienna as Rudolphina Waltusch to an upper middle class assimilated Jewish family. In 1914, she earned a doctorate in chemistry from the University of Vienna. Following World War I, she and her husband Rudoph Menzel settled in Linz and began a career in cynology.

== Career ==
Menzel undertook a 16-year study in which the behavior of hundreds of Boxers was observed, with observations made on which behavioral traits were genetic as opposed to environmentally influenced. In a landmark 1930 paper, she found that with proper training dogs could discern the scents of individual humans. She trained dogs in this method for use as police dogs. She became a consultant for the Austrian and German police and militaries in dog training. In 1934, following Hitler's rise to power, she stopped working for them but her training methods continued to be used by them. In 1938, following the German annexation of Austria, the authorities ordered the immediate closure of her kennel. In August 1938, she and her husband fled to Mandatory Palestine.

In Palestine, Menzel established the Palestine Research Institute for Canine Psychology and Training. She urged the Yishuv to adopt dogs as potential guards of Jewish lives and property. She found that the standard breeds used for guarding, tracking and other tasks were unable to cope with the harsh climate and terrain, so she sought an alternative, turning to the local pariah dog, which she bred into the Canaan Dog.

During World War II, Menzel became a significant supplier of mine-detecting dogs for British forces. Due to a shortage of trained dogs, the British authorities turned to Menzel, who agreed to help on condition that the dogs never be used against the Yishuv, and from 1942 her institute began selling trained mine-sniffing dogs for use in the North African campaign. Over 400 mine-sniffing dogs trained by Menzel's methods were ultimately deployed by British forces in the war, and British soldiers of all ranks found their performance to be excellent.

In November 1947, the Haganah began to lay the groundwork for a dog unit that would be the forerunner of the Oketz Unit of the Israel Defense Forces. In February 1948, she was informed that a Central Military Dog Training Camp would be established but was asked to be a professional supervisor rather than lead it. One of her students, Abraham Zirlin, was assigned to be the commander of the canine unit instead. She was able to occasionally work with military dogs and was appointed to be a government advisor for dog breeding and training. Following the formation of the Israel Defense Forces, her military career came to an end. The IDF's canine unit would be active until 1954, when it was shut down for twenty years before being reestablished as the Oketz Unit in 1974.

In the 1950s, Menzel began training guide dogs. She founded the Israel Institute for Orientation and Mobility of the Blind, which was the first guide dog institute in the Middle East. In 1962, she was appointed an associate professor of animal psychology at Tel Aviv University, where she continued to conduct research almost until her death.

In 1965, she exported four Canaan Dogs to the United States, and later sent specimens of the breed to Germany.

Menzel sent a male Canaan Dog to Mrs. Connie Higgins in the United Kingdom. In 1964, Mrs. Higgins had already acquired a female puppy from a wild litter in Damascus, and on 28 December 1969, she bred the first known litter of Canaan Dogs born in the United Kingdom.

In 1970, Shaar Hagai Kennels, located near Jerusalem, worked closely with Dr. Menzel in the development and breeding of the breed, and continued her work after her death in 1973.
