= Telomian =

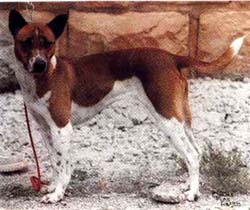
- Origin: Malaysia
- Breed status: Not recognized as a breed by any major kennel club.
Traits
- Height: 15–19 in (38–48 cm)
- Weight: 18–28 lb (8.2–12.7 kg)

The Telomian is a type of dog found in isolated villages near the Telom River in the rainforests of the Malay Peninsula. It has been introduced into the United States. Some US-based breeders were selling these dogs as pure breds, which was dismissed with the Malaysian Kennel Association in a statement that these are pariah dogs and not a breed.

== Description ==
These are an active dog that is affectionate towards people, and possess a terrier-like temperament. They feature erect ears, curly tails, with short fur on the coat that is either red or yellow. There may be some variation in coat colour. Some are piebald in colour, and occasionally some have a black mask.

They are noted for their climbing ability because their owners live in huts raised from the forest floor with access by primitive ladders. They kill rats and snakes, for which they are rewarded with food. They are also able to catch their own prey. They have a unique call and the females only have one heat per year instead of two like other dogs.

== History ==
The anthropologist Dr. Orville Elliot sent a pair to the US in 1963 to be studied by the canine expert J. P. Scott. Elliot received a second pair in 1973 and all Telomians in the US are descended from these 4 dogs.

Telomians are also kept by the Orang Asli not only as pets, but for hunting as well.
