= Sinhala Hound =

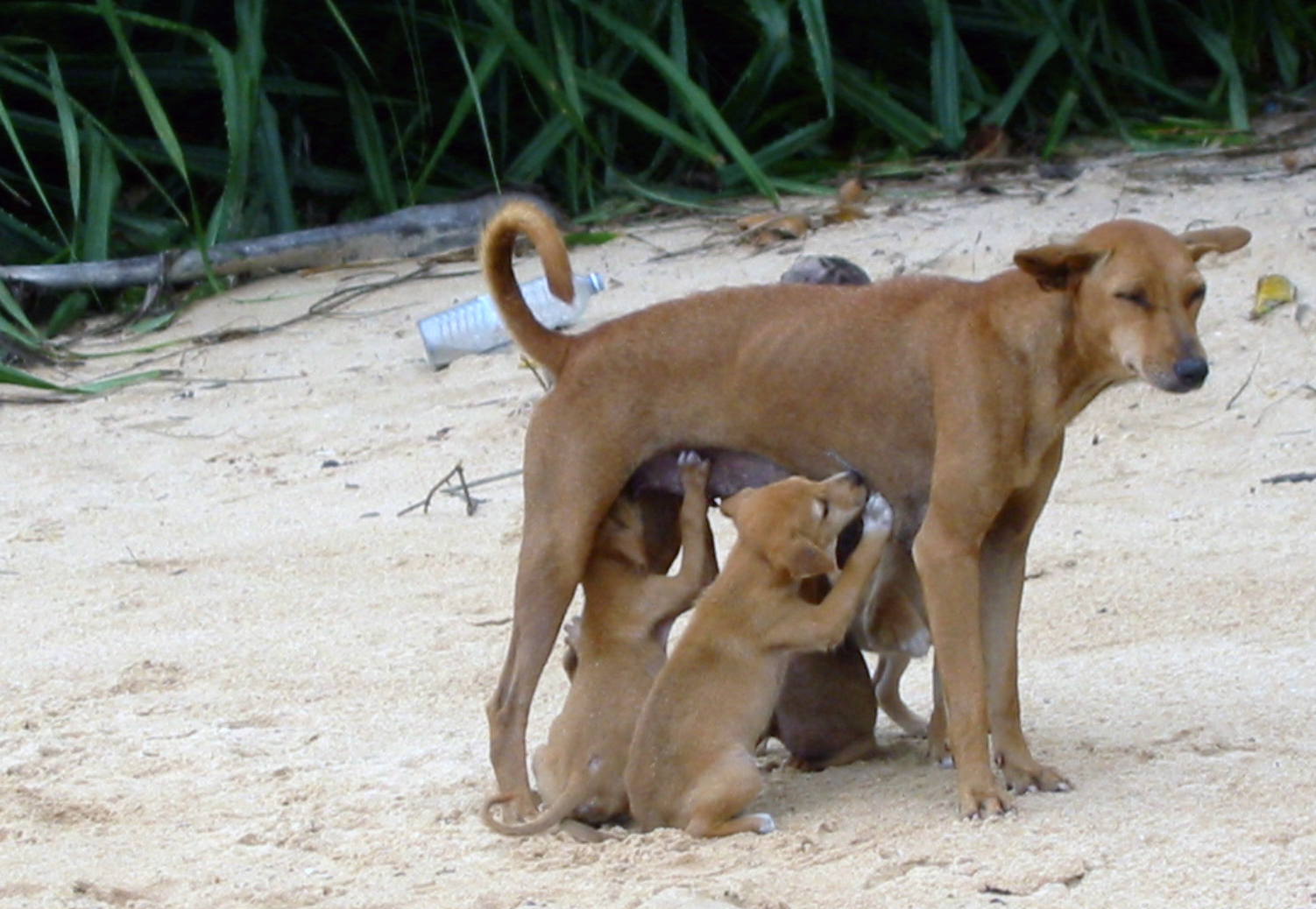
- A Sinhala Hound nursing her pups
- Origin: Sri Lanka
- Breed status: Not recognised as a breed by any major kennel club.

The Sinhala Hound is a landrace of dog from Sri Lanka.

The Sinhala Hound is a native dog found throughout Sri Lanka, often living in a semi-wild state scavenging for food. According to a native legend, when Prince Vijaya first set foot on Sri Lanka in the 6th century BC, he was greeted by the barking of dogs; the Mahāvaṃsa mentions domestic dogs belonging to the island's Stone Age inhabitants, the Yaksha. (Note: Fossil evidence indicates domestic dogs have been found on Sri Lanka for over 11,000 years.) The average lifetime of Sinhala Hounds is 10-13 years.

Long overlooked by authorities in favour of imported dog breeds, only recently has the Sri Lankan Kennel Club been encouraged to recognize the landrace as a breed.

== Physical characteristics ==
The Sinhala Hound can be found in a variety of colors, but brown or dark brown brindle are most common. They are very similar in form to the African Basenji, the New Guinea singing dog, the Carolina Dog and the Australian Dingo.

== See also ==
- List of dog breeds
- List of dog breeds from India
- Pye dog
- Indian pariah dog
