= Cynology =

Study of canines or domestic dogs

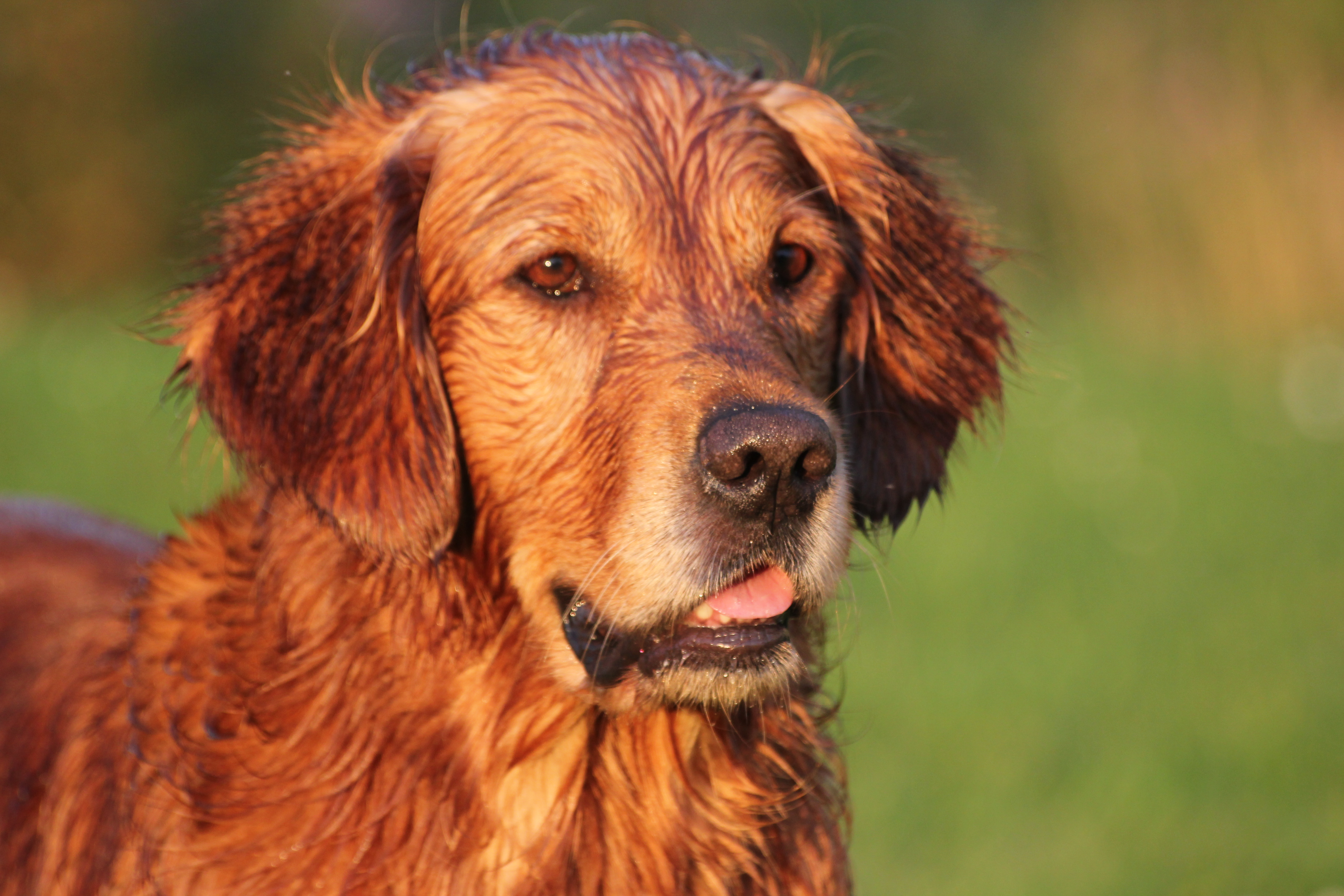
A Golden Retriever

Cynology /sɪˈnɒlədʒi/ (rarely kynology /kɪˈnɒlədʒi/) is the study of matters related to canines or domestic dogs. In English, it is a term sometimes used to denote a serious zoological approach to the study of dogs as well as by writers on canine subjects, dog breeders, trainers and enthusiasts who study the dog informally.

== Etymology ==
Cynology is a classical compound word (from Greek κύων, kyōn, κυνός, kynos, 'dog'; and -λογία, -logia) referring to the study of dogs. The word is not found in major English dictionaries and it is not a recognized study in English-speaking countries. Similar words are in other languages, such German and Dutch Kynologie. κυν is also the source of the English word cynic, and is directly related to canine and hound.

== Usage in English ==
The suffix '-logy' in English words refers to a study, or an academic discipline, or field of scientific study. English classical compound words of this type may confer an impression of scientific rigor on a non-scientific occupation or profession.

Usage in English of the word cynology is rare, and occasionally found in the names of dog training academies, with cynologist sometimes being used as a title by some dog trainers or handlers. People who informally study the dog may refer to themselves as 'cynologists' to imply serious study or scientific work.

The very rare term cynologist in English is generally found to refer to "canine specialists" such as; certified care professionals, certified show judges, breeders, breed enthusiasts, certified dog-trainers and professional dog-handlers.

== Famous cynologists ==
- Nils Erik Hjalmar Åhmansson (born 23 May 1941), Åhmansson was National Police Commissioner from 1 January 1988 to 20 October 1988. He was chairman of the Swedish Kennel Club from 1993 to 2015.
- Phyllis Gardner (6 October 1890 – 16 February 1939), was a writer, artist, and noted breeder of Irish Wolfhounds
- Rudolphina Menzel (1891–1973) was a cynologist, best known for her work in the field of animal behavior, from Vienna, Austria. She was responsible for gaining recognition for the Canaan Dog; and she wrote the breed standard, which was accepted by the FCI in 1966.
- Chris Zink, is the director of the Department of Molecular and Comparative Pathobiology at the Johns Hopkins School of Medicine. She researches the immune system's response to retroviruses like HIV and explores potential therapies. As a veterinarian, she is an expert in canine athletics and stem cell therapies for dogs, and she has authored several books on these topics. Zink was named Outstanding Woman Veterinarian of the Year in 2009 and has also received awards for her photography. Born in Toronto, Canada, she currently holds multiple professorships at Johns Hopkins.
