= Ashkelon National Park =

Nature reserve in Israel

- גן לאומי אשקלון
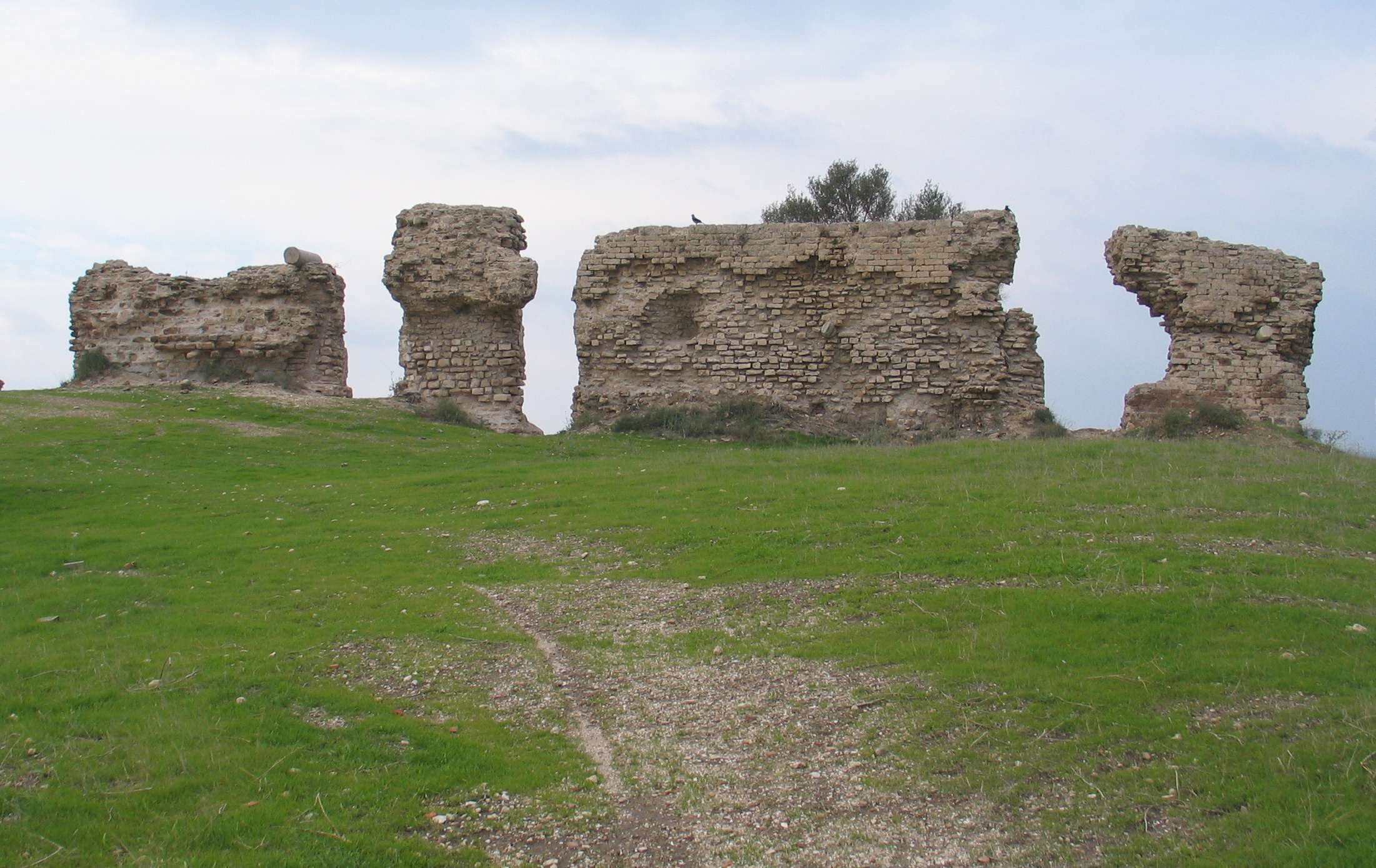

- Location within Israel
- Nearest city: Ashkelon
- Coordinates: 31°39′50″N 34°32′45″E

Ashkelon National Park (Hebrew: גן לאומי אשקלון, Arabic: متنزه قومي عسقلان) is an Israeli national park consisting of the ruins of ancient Ascalon and Palestinian village Al-Jura, situated along the shore of the Mediterranean Sea southwest of the city of Ashkelon.

The national park encompasses the heart of ancient Ascalon. It is surrounded by a wall built in the mid-12th century by the Fatimid Caliphate. The wall was originally 2,200 meters in length, 50 meters in width and 15 meters in height. The remains of the wall are located in the eastern and southern parts of the national park.

The site contains archeological remains of the different civilizations that lived in the area, including Canaanites, Philistines, Persians, Phoenicians, Greeks, Romans, Byzantines, Muslims and Crusaders. Roman remains include marble and granite columns and capitals, a Roman basilica and Roman statues. The site also features a Middle Bronze Age gate with the world's earliest arch, dating back to approximately 1850 BCE.

== Archaeology ==
Archaeology
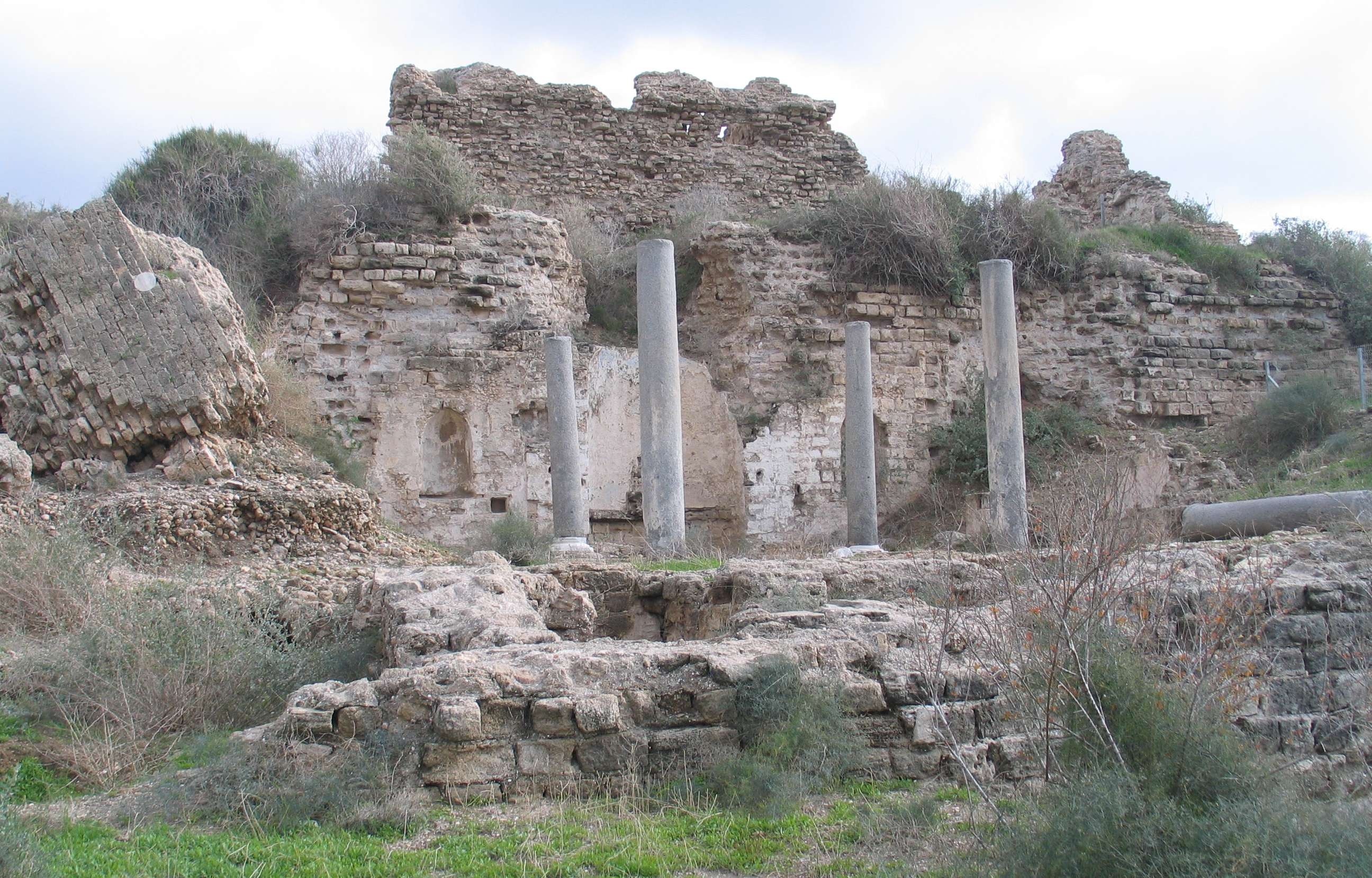
- Interactive map of Archaeology
- Periods: Canaanite, Philistine, Persian, Phoenician, Greek, Roman, Byzantine, Muslim, Crusader

History
- Built: Mid-12th century (current walls)
- Built by: Fatimid Caliphate, various ancient civilizations

Site notes
- Excavation dates: 1815, 1921, 1985-present
- Archaeologists: Lady Hester Stanhope, British School of Archaeology in Jerusalem, Harvard University, Israel Antiquities Authority
- Public access: Yes

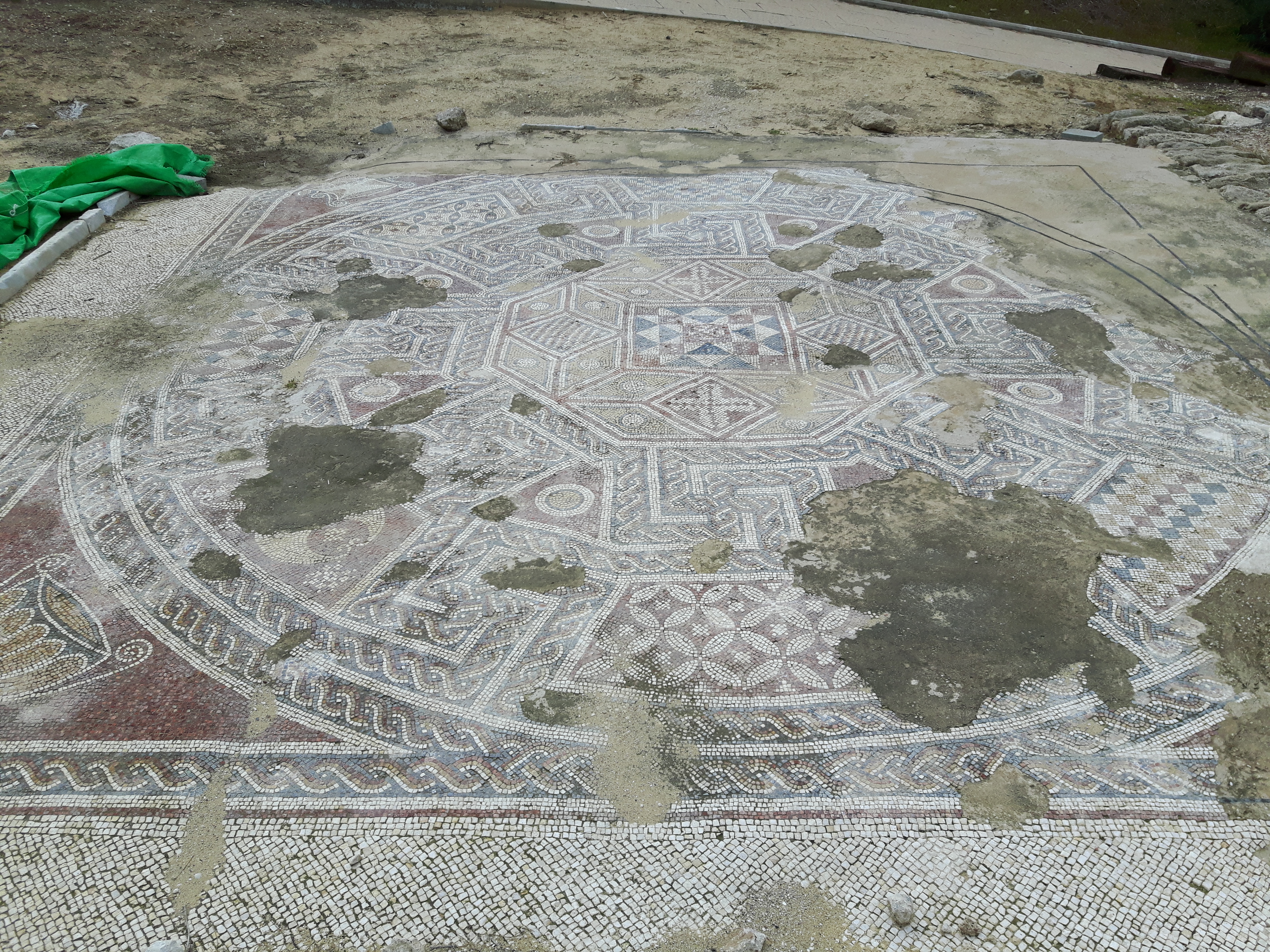
Elaborated mosaic floor at Ashkelon

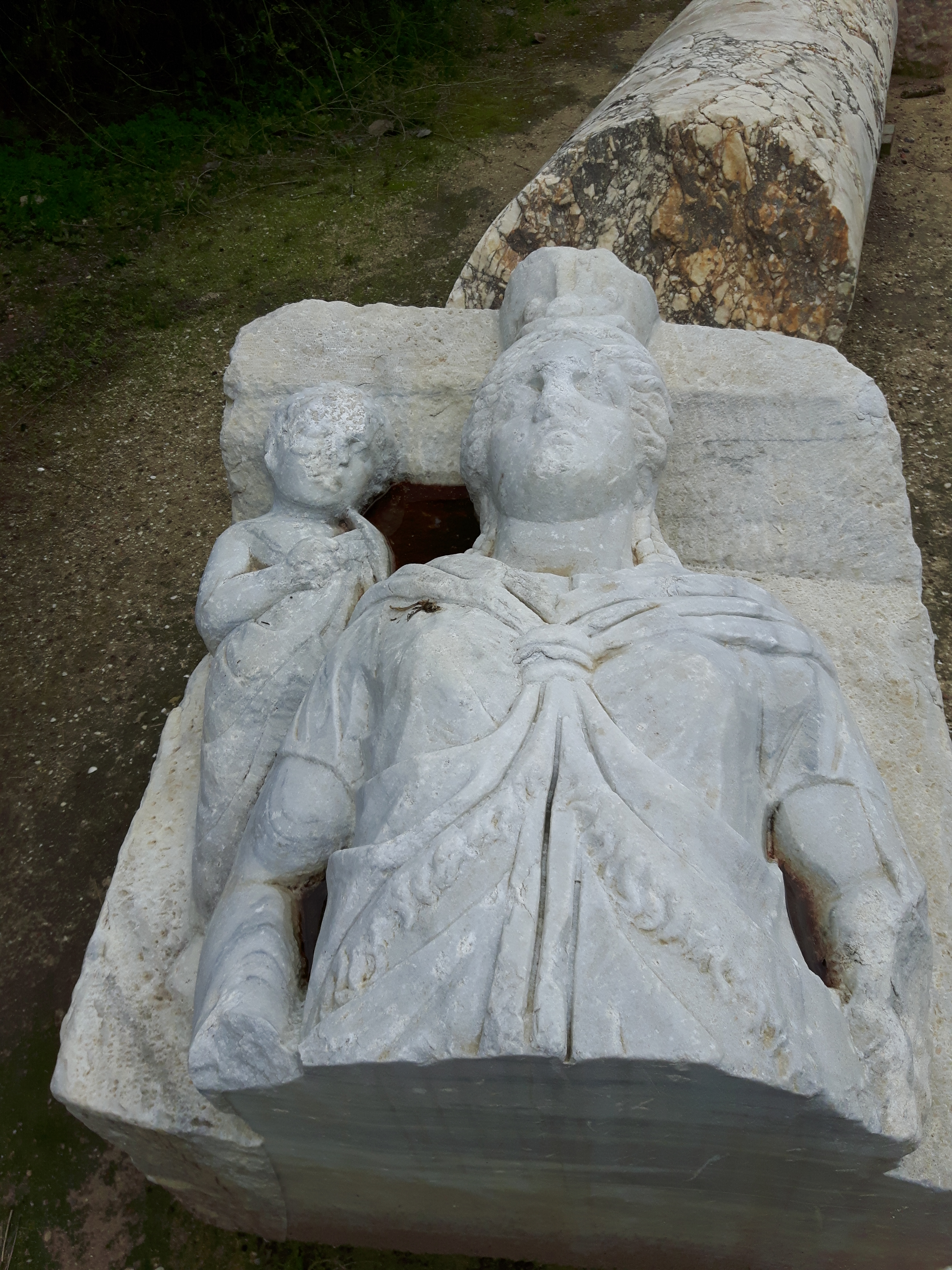
Roman statue

In 1815, Lady Hester Stanhope's expedition to Ascalon constituted the first modern archaeological excavation in Palestine. Using a medieval Italian manuscript as her guide, she persuaded the Ottoman authorities to allow her to excavate the site in search of a large hoard of gold coins allegedly buried under the ruins of the Ascalon mosque. The governor of Jaffa, Abu Nabbut (Father of the Cudgel) was ordered to accompany her. On the second day of digging, the lower foundation walls of the mosque were discovered at a depth of three or four feet, along with fragments of marble pillars, a Corinthian capital, a faience vessel, and two small pottery phials. Further exploration revealed several distinct phases in the history of the structure, leading to the conclusion that the site had originally been a pagan temple converted into a church and then a mosque. Stanhope's main find was a seven-foot headless marble statue, which was smashed and thrown into the sea.

In 1921, the British School of Archaeology in Jerusalem began excavations at Ascalon, focusing on the same columns and semi-circular wall explored by Lady Hester. They dated the earliest structure, featuring Corinthian columns and a row of pedestals, to Herod. The foot and arm of a colossal marble statue were found at this level. The British excavators identified the structure as a municipal council hall.

In 1948, the Palestinian village of Al-Jura (population 2,420) was ethnically cleansed in Operation Yoav and the land later incorporated into the park.

In 1985, Harvard University archaeologist Lawrence Stager led an excavation of the seaport. Beginning in 2007, excavation projects have focused on the Early Iron and Late Bronze Age phases in Grid 38, the only area with a sequence that traces all periods, from Early Bronze through the Islamic and Crusader eras. This area also provides a complete record of Philistine occupation, from their arrival in the early 12th century BC to the destruction of Ascalon by Nebuchadnezzar in 604 BC.

In 2007, ground penetrating radar (GPR) was used to find remains of the Islamic ramparts and a major basilica in the Roman Forum. In 2009, GPR and probes were used in combination to study the city's medieval fortifications.

Excavations have revealed the largest known dog cemetery in the ancient world.

In May 2021, archaeologists from the Israel Antiquities Authority led by Dr. Rachel Bar Nathan have announced the discovery of remains of a 2,000-year-old Roman basilica complex- dates to the reign of Herod the Great. The building was contained 3 sections -a central hall and two side parts. According to the excavators, big marble columns and capitals surrounded the main hall imported from Asia Minor in merchant ship. Remains of column capitals with plant motifs, some bearing an eagle were the symbol of the Roman Empire.

== See also ==
- Archeology of Israel
- Syro-Palestinian archaeology
