= Ashkelon dog cemetery =

Archaeological site in Ashkelon, Israel

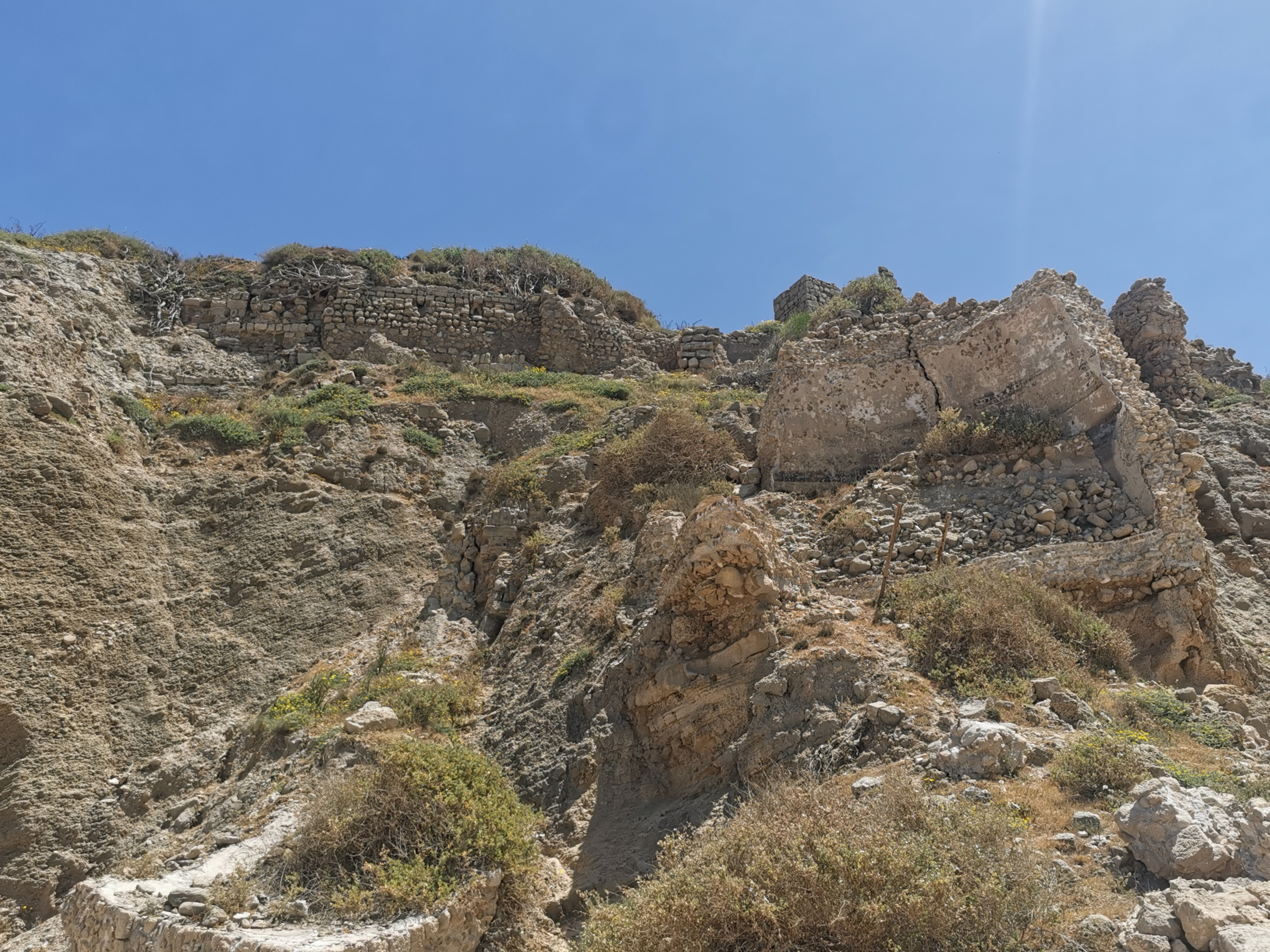
View of the Ashkelon dog cemetery, 2021

The Ashkelon dog cemetery is an ancient burial site in today's Ashkelon National Park, Israel, where possibly thousands of dogs were interred between the 5th century BC and the 3rd century BC. The majority of these dogs were puppies; all had similarities to the modern Canaan dog, perhaps representing the ancestral population from which the modern breed is descended. It is the largest known animal cemetery of this kind in the ancient world.

Dogs are thought to be connected to the worship of the goddess Astarte in the Canaanite religion. The Estonian scholar M. Heltzer notes evidence from Sicily, Italy, of a possible cultic link between dogs and Astarte, and the Greek historian Herodotus mentions that the oldest temple in Ashkelon was dedicated to the goddess Aphrodite, who was associated with Astarte in the Greek religion.

== Description ==
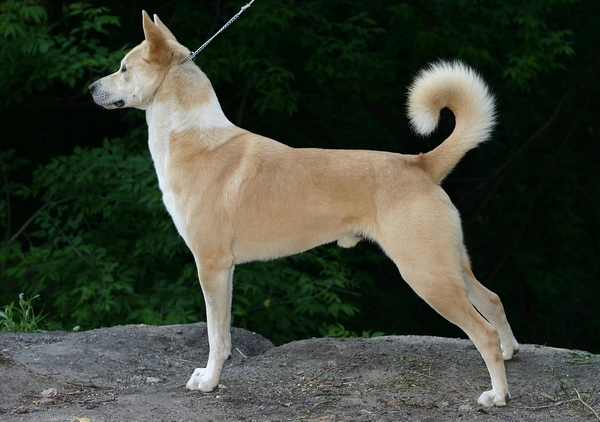
A Canaan dog, of similar breed to the dogs buried at the Ashkelon dog cemetery thousands of years ago, 2011

The cemetery was discovered in the Ashkelon National Park by Lawrence Stager during excavations undertaken between 1986 and 1994 for the Leon Levy Expedition to Ashkelon. His team uncovered the skeletons of more than 1,300 dogs. They had been buried at a time when the Phoenician-populated city was ruled by Achaemenid Persia as a client state.

Most of the dogs were found buried in a series of terraces which had previously been occupied by a large warehouse overlooking the sea. The burial ground extended south into an area that appears to have only been briefly been used as a dog cemetery before being built upon, and probably extended west into an area that has been lost to coastal erosion. The burials have been dated to between the fifth and the first part of the fourth century BC. The burial ground may have been in use for about fifty years. Stager notes that as "only the eastern limits of the cemetery have been established, we can speculate that it was originally much larger, with dog burials probably numbering in the thousands." He describes it as "by far the largest dog cemetery known in the ancient world." Another series of burials was found to the north-east, where dogs had been buried in streets or in thoroughfares between large buildings. These were of later dates, from the late Persian period to the early Hellenistic period.

Each animal occupied an individual shallow pit and was laid on its side with its tail tucked between its hind legs. The burials were not marked, there were no offerings in the pits and the dogs were not oriented in any consistent direction. The corpses were carefully interred, in some cases perhaps having their limbs bound at the ankles before burial. In contrast, the burial pits were dug somewhat haphazardly, overlapping and occasionally intruding on each other. At least sixty percent of the dogs were puppies; some were probably fetuses. The burials appear to have taken place individually over time, rather than en masse.

The cause of death does not appear to have been sacrificial. None of the skeletons show evidence of fatal injuries, and they do not show any signs of having been cut up or skinned before burial. It is possible that they could have been poisoned, which would have left no traces on the skeletons. However, it seems more likely that the deaths were due to natural causes, as the death rates for urban dogs in a pre-veterinary environment were very high; perhaps as many as fifty percent are likely to have died in their first year.

An alternative hypothesis has been put forward suggesting that the dogs died in an epidemic. However, this is inconsistent with the demographics of the buried dogs, as an outbreak would be expected to affect all members of the affected population, whereas the Ashkelon population is heavily skewed towards puppies.

The dogs were physically similar, with close anatomical similarities to the present-day Canaan dog. Rather than being a single breed, they appear to represent examples of a naturally occurring canid population adapted to the hot and semi-arid conditions of the region. Dogs of this type gave rise to the Canaan Dog through selective breeding in modern times.

== Interpretation ==
=== Ancient Semitic religion and Zoroastrianism ===
Numerous dog burials with religious contexts have been found in the southern Levant, dating back as far as 3500 BC. The phenomenon of dog burials in the region appears to have reached a peak under the Persian rule (586–332 BC) and continued into the Hellenistic period, though the reasons for the growth and decline of the practice are unclear. Individual or small numbers of dog burials have been found throughout the region, though the Ashkelon cemetery is in a class of its own for its sheer size.

Stager hypothesizes that "the best explanation seems to be that the Ashkelon dogs were revered as sacred animals. As such, they were probably associated with a particular deity and with that god's sacred precinct, about which the dogs were free to roam." The care taken with the individual interments indicates "an intense relationship between dogs and humans." Dogs were revered in Persian Zoroastrian tradition, but were also associated with healing gods in Canaanite, Phoenician, Babylonian and Assyrian tradition. For instance, the Babylonian goddess of health, Nintinugga or Gula, had the dog as her symbol and was described as "she who by the touch of her pure hand revives the dead." M. Heltzer notes evidence from Sicily of a possible cultic link between dogs and the Middle Eastern goddess Astarte, and Herodotus mentions that the oldest temple in Ashkelon was dedicated to Aphrodite, who the Greeks associated with Astarte.

The dogs may have been part of a healing cult in which they were trained to lick the wounds or sores of humans, in exchange for a fee. Stager speculates that future archaeologists may discover a temple dedicated to the cult somewhere in the ruins of ancient Ashkelon. The identity of the deity concerned is unknown, but he suggests that it may have been Resheph, the Phoenician god of healing and plague.

The Book of Deuteronomy may refer to this obliquely in a verse (23:18) which reads: "You shall not bring the hire of a prostitute or the wages of a dog into the house of the Lord your God in payment for any vow." Biblical scholars have interpreted "the wages of a dog" (Hebrew: מְחִ֣יר כֶּ֗לֶב məḥîr keleḇ) as a reference to male prostitution. However, it is possible that the phrase refers instead to healing dogs. Stager speculates that a similar cult may have operated in the vicinity of the Temple in Jerusalem, whose attendants may have received fees for their services. This could have prompted the Deuteronomist to prohibit using such fees as payments for vows in the Temple. The dogs would have been seen as doubly impure for being associated with a foreign religion and consuming the filth emanating from sores and wounds.

=== Sacredness ===
The main area where dogs were buried has often been termed a cemetery, implying a sacred area set aside for burials, but Paula Wapnish and Brian Hesse note that "dogs were buried where there was space, rather than a space being prepared to receive dogs." If the dogs were buried in conjunction with religious activities, the combination of careful burial with a lack of markers or grave goods and the disturbance of previous burials may indicate that the dogs were revered up to the point of burial, then granted no significance thereafter. Alternatively, Wapnish and Hesse suggest that the dogs were simply semi-feral urban dogs whose burial in one principal site was simply the result of local custom rather than any religious motivation. Another explanation has been put forward by Anne Marie Smith, who argues that the dogs could have been bred for trade to supply dog-venerating cults in the eastern Mediterranean and Middle East, and were buried on the same site where they lived.
