= Canaan Dog =

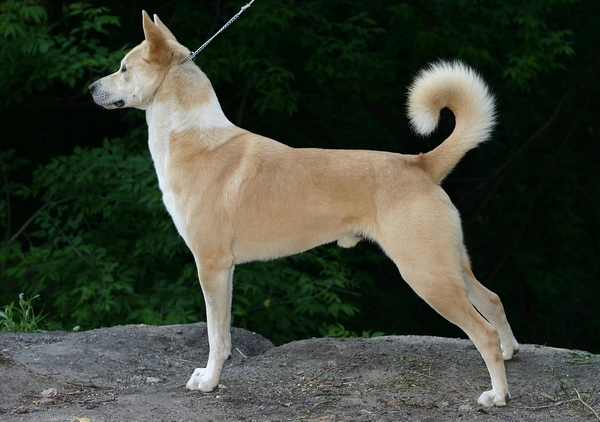
- Origin: Israel
Traits
| Height | Males | 50–60 cm (20–24 in) |
| | Females | 45–50 cm (18–20 in) |
| Weight | Males | 18–25 kg (40–55 lb) |
- Coat: Outer coat of short to medium length. Dense, harsh, and straight.
- Colour: Desert colours of sand, gold, red, or cream are most typical. Red-brown, white, black, or spotted are common as well.
Kennel club standards
- Fédération Cynologique Internationale: standard

The Canaan Dog (Hebrew: כֶּלֶב כְּנַעֲנִי, romanized: Kelev kna'ani, lit. 'Canaanite dog', Arabic: كلب كنعاني, romanized: kalb kanʿāni) is a dog breed developed in the early 20th century from semiwild pariah dogs that were the descendants of animals present in the region since biblical times. It is the national dog of Israel and can be found in Israel, Jordan, Lebanon, Palestine, and the Sinai Peninsula. As of 2012, there were 2,000 to 3,000 Canaan Dogs across the world.

== Naming ==
The Canaan dog is also known as the Kelev K'naani, Israel Canaan Dog, Bedouin Sheep dog and Palestinian Pariah Dog. The breed standard was created by Israeli Professor Rudolphina Menzel in 1966.

== History ==
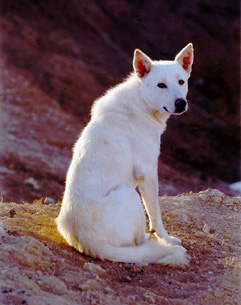
Canaan dog

Canaan dogs, or dogs nearly identical, were also found in Syria over 9,000 years ago. At the time of the diaspora, the Israelites were forcefully removed from their land and, according to oral tradition, had to leave behind their dogs which reverted to the wild. Excavations in Israel unearthed the Ashkelon dog cemetery, the largest known animal cemetery in the ancient world, containing 700 dog skeletons, all of which were anatomically similar to the Canaan dog of modern times. The cemetery dates back to the time of occupation by the Persian Empire and archaeologists hypothesize that the dogs were revered as sacred animals. Populations of free-ranging dogs continued to be found in the Negev for many years, with Bedouins using them to herd their livestock and guard their camps.

Animal behaviorist Rudolphina Menzel discovered these dogs in the 1930s. She captured a select group of semi-wild dogs, tamed, trained, and began breeding them. Menzel found these dogs to be highly adaptable and simple to domesticate. She launched a breeding program, providing working dogs for the military, named the dogs of this program "Canaan dogs."

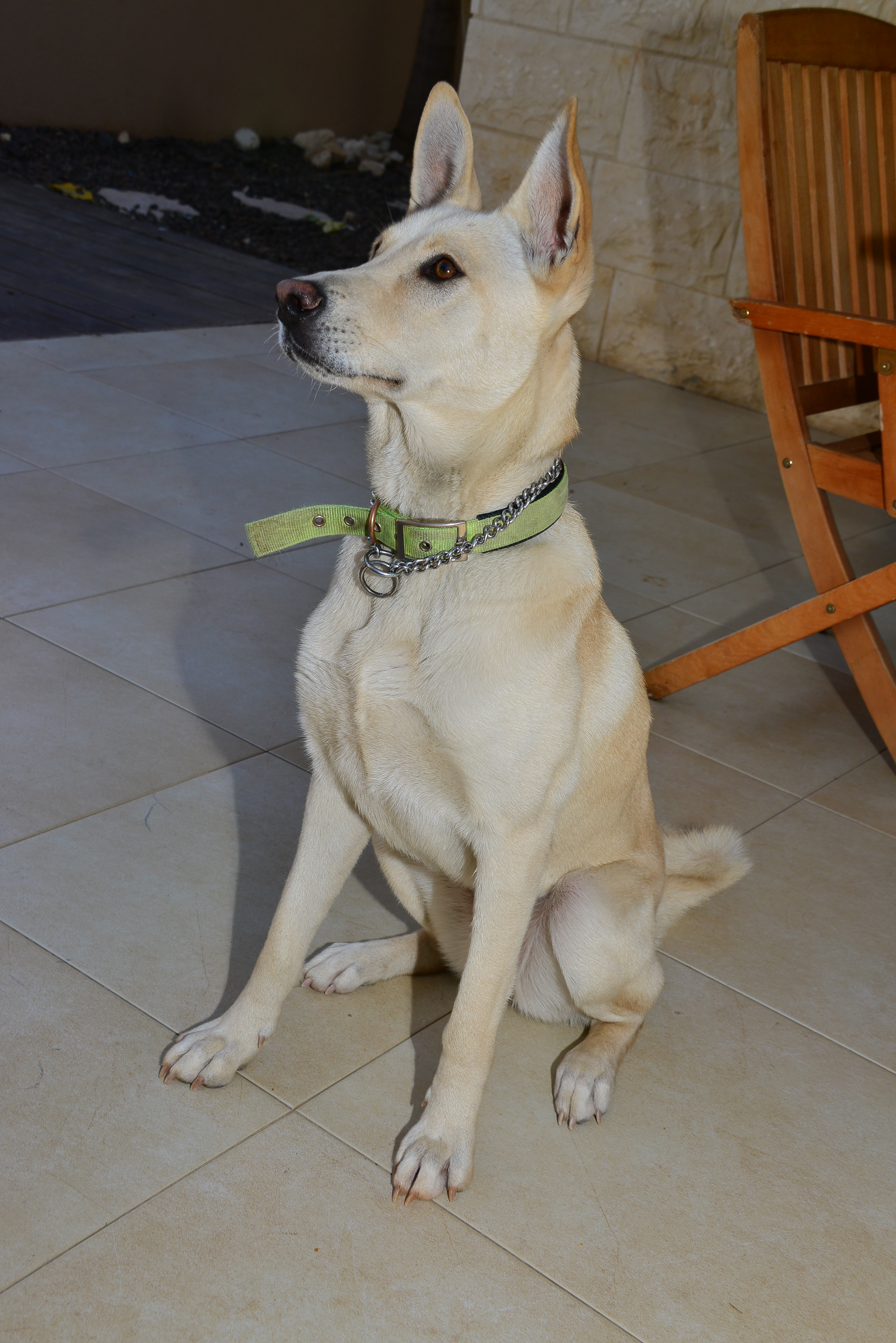
Canaan dog sitting

Menzel began training Canaan dogs as guide dogs for the blind, establishing the Institute for Orientation and Mobility of the Blind in 1949. The Red Cross also started employing her dogs as search and rescue dogs. In 1953, the breed gained recognition by the Israel Kennel Club using Menzel's standard.

After her death in 1973, Shaar Hagai Kennels, managed by Dvora Ben Shaul and Myrna Shiboleth, continued the breeding program according to her instructions.

Collection of wild Canaan dogs in Israel has become very difficult, because many of the Canaan dogs living in the open there were destroyed by the Israeli government in the fight against rabies. The spread of the human population into areas that were formerly isolated, along with their pet dogs, has resulted in the loss of the natural habitat of the Canaan. Even the majority of Bedouin dogs today, other than those of tribes still living a traditional and isolated life style, are mixed with other breeds. It is possible that there are still original Canaans among Bedouin tribes that still live the traditional nomadic life elsewhere, and perhaps in Egypt. Myrna Shiboleth visits the Negev regularly, looking for good specimens living by the Bedouin camps, that she can breed with her dogs and use to strengthen the gene pool.

== Appearance ==
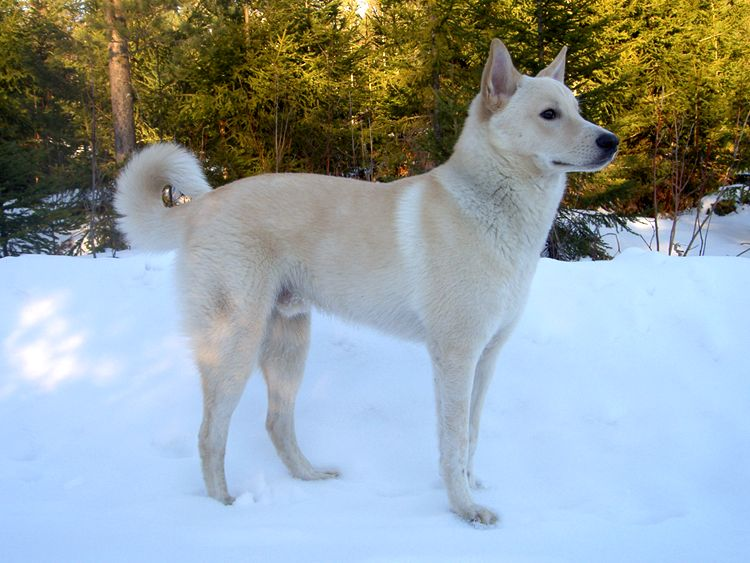
Canaan Dog

The Canaan Dog is a "wild type" dog in appearance. It is a medium-sized square built dog, with a wedge-shaped head, erect and low set ears with a broad base and rounded tips. Its outer coat is dense, harsh and straight of short to medium-length. The undercoat should be close and profuse according to season. Color ranges from black to cream and all shades of brown and red between, usually with small white markings, or all white with colour patches. Spotting of all kinds is permitted, as well as white or black masks.

In writing the first official standard for the Canaan Dog, Menzel wrote: "Special importance must be placed on the points that differentiate the Canaan Dog from the German Shepherd Dog, whose highly bred form he sometimes resembles: the Canaan-dog is square, the loin region short, the forequarters highly erect, the hindquarters less angular, the neck as noble as possible, the tail curled over the back when excited, the trot is short (see also differences in head and color)".

== Temperament ==
Canaan dogs are alert, react quickly and distrust strangers. They are strongly defensive but not aggressive.

== Skills ==
Canaan dogs can compete in dog agility trials, obedience, showmanship, flyball, tracking, and herding events. Herding instincts and trainability can be measured at noncompetitive herding tests. Canaans exhibiting basic herding instincts can be trained to compete in herding trials.

== Breed recognition ==
The Canaan dog was first recognized by the Israel Kennel Club in 1953 and by the FCI (Federation Cynologique Internationale) in 1966. The first accepted standard was written by Dr. Menzel. In 1986, the first Canaan dogs were brought to Finland from Sha'ar Hagai Kennel, in Israel. The Canaan Dog is today recognized by all the world's kennel clubs and is being bred in many countries. There are breed clubs in the U.S., Canada, the U.K., Finland, Germany, Israel and France.

=== Canada ===
The first Canaan dogs came to Canada on May 16, 1970. The dogs came from a kennel in Delaware. The Canadian Canaan Club was formed in 1972, and the first executive of the Club was elected on March 15, 1973. The club has since been dissolved. The Canaan dog obtained entry into the Miscellaneous Class of the Canadian Kennel Club on December 1, 1975. In January 1993, the breed was accepted in the Working Group, as the Canadian Kennel Club did not have a Herding group at that time.

=== United Kingdom ===
The first Canaan Dog was brought to the UK from Lebanon in 1965, before they were a recognized breed. In December 1970, they were recognized by the Kennel Club, and the breed was placed in the Utility Group. In May 1992 the inaugural meeting of the Canaan Dog Club of the United Kingdom took place. Since 1996 the breed has begun to grow in numbers in the UK, though it is still quite numerically small.

=== United States ===
On September 7, 1965, Menzel sent four dogs to Ursula Berkowitz of Oxnard, California, the first Canaan dogs in the United States. The Canaan Dog Club of America was formed the same year, and stud book records were kept from these first reports. In June 1989, the Canaan dog entered the American Kennel Club (AKC) Miscellaneous Class, and then joined the Herding Group in 1997. Its profile was raised when John F. Kennedy Jr. purchased a Canaan dog, Friday, in 1995. Canaan dogs were registered in the AKC Stud Book as of June 1, 1997. The dogs began competing in conformation on August 12, 1997. The United Kennel Club recognized the Canaan Dog in 1992 as part of the Sighthound & Pariah Dog Group and has the Israel Canaan Dog Club of America as the parent club. About 50 puppies are born each year.

== See also ==
- List of dog breeds
