= Pye-dog =

Dog type

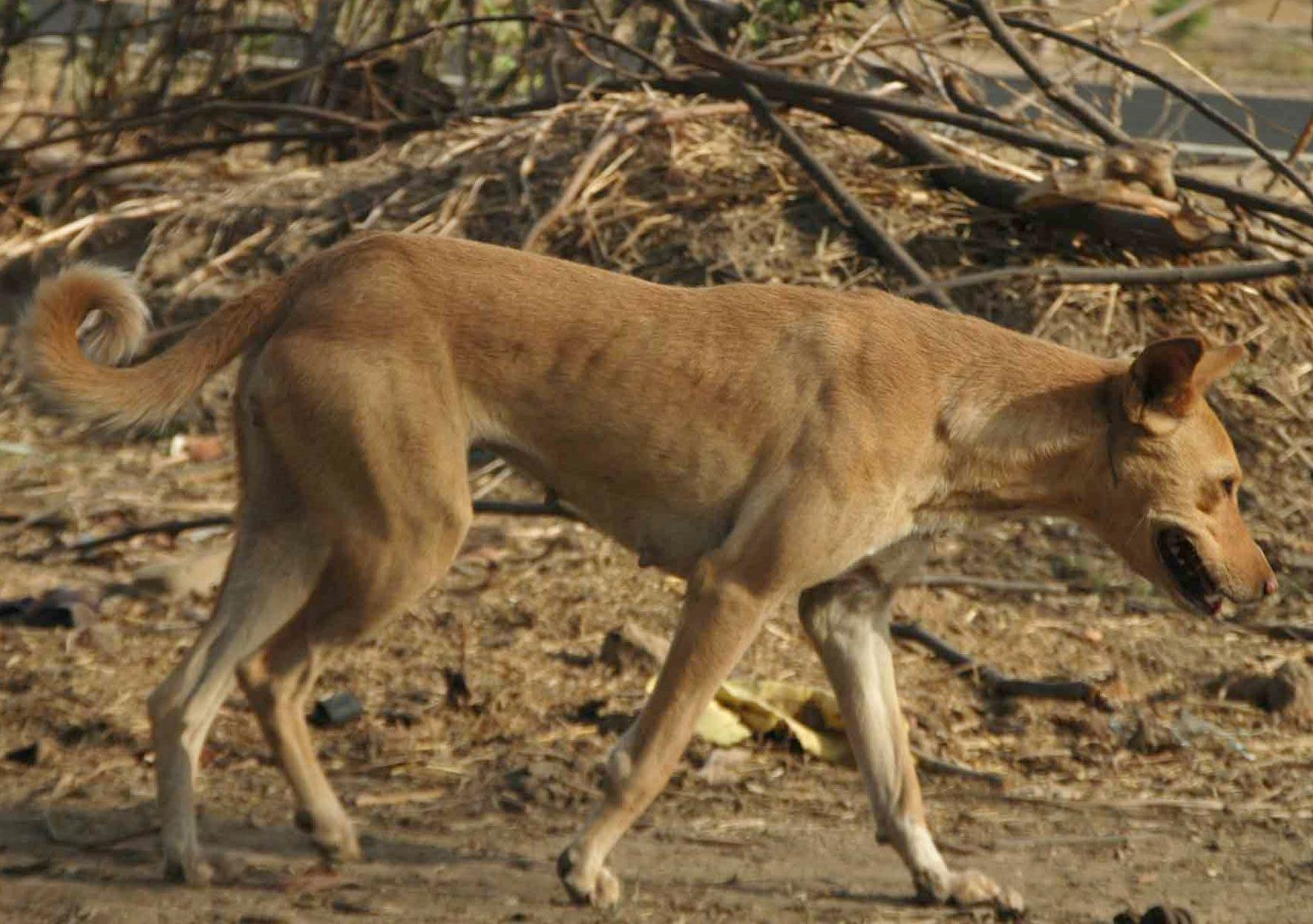
An Indian pariah dog

Pye-dog, also known as the pariah dog, is a term used to describe an ownerless, half-wild, free-ranging dog that lives in or close to human settlements throughout South Asia, South China, the Middle East and North Africa. The term is derived from the Hindi pāhī, which translates to "outsider".

The appearance of pye-dogs varies considerably across the extent of its range. In some areas they can resemble herding dogs and in other areas they are more similar to sighthounds. They can be solid-coloured and sometimes striped, although their heads tend to be similar to spitz-type dogs. Depictions of the Egyptian god Anubis are often based on pye-dogs, although more frequently they are based on jackals.

The United Kennel Club uses the term pariah dog to classify various breeds in a sighthound and pariah group.

== Gallery ==
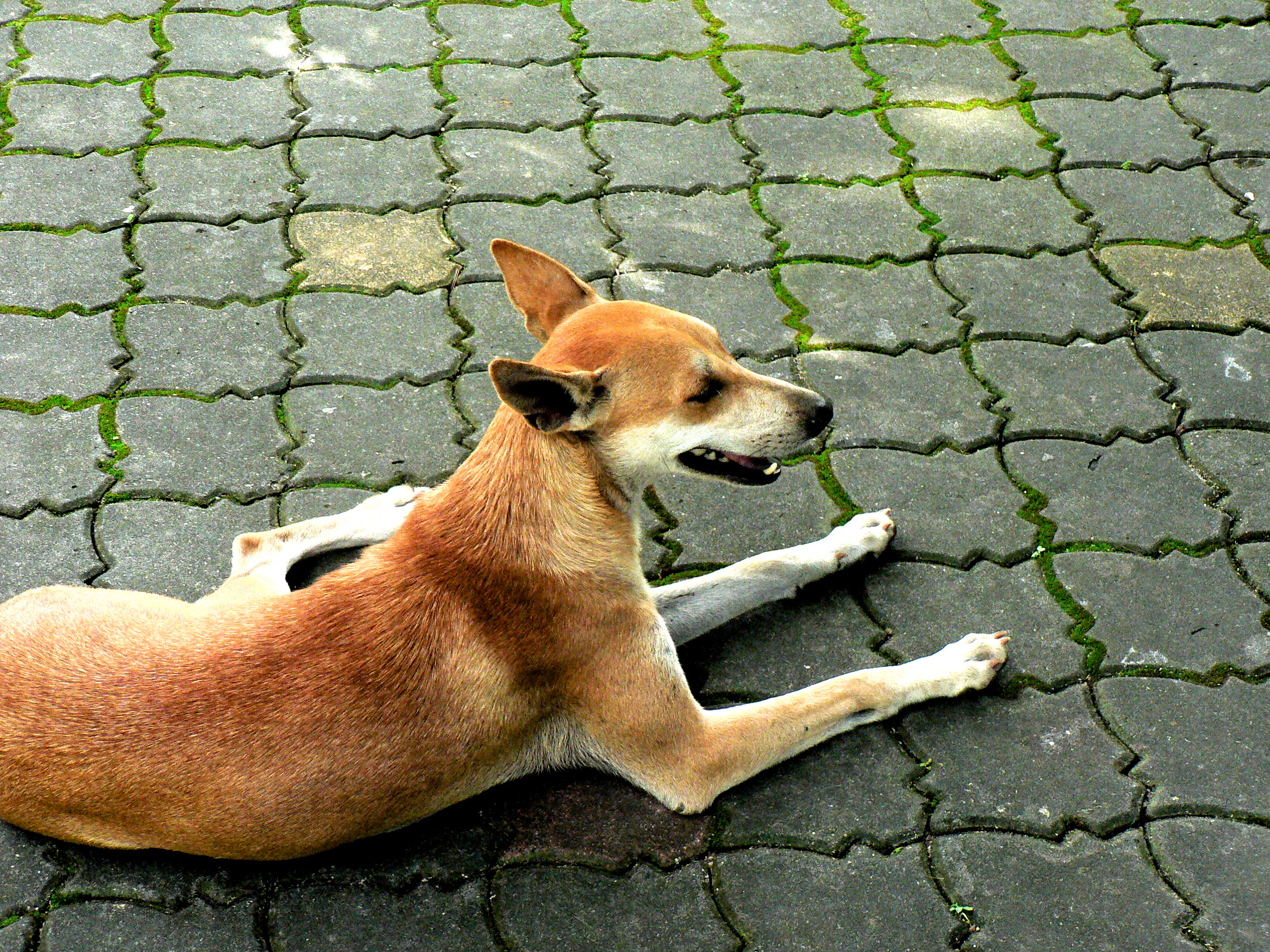
In Malaysia

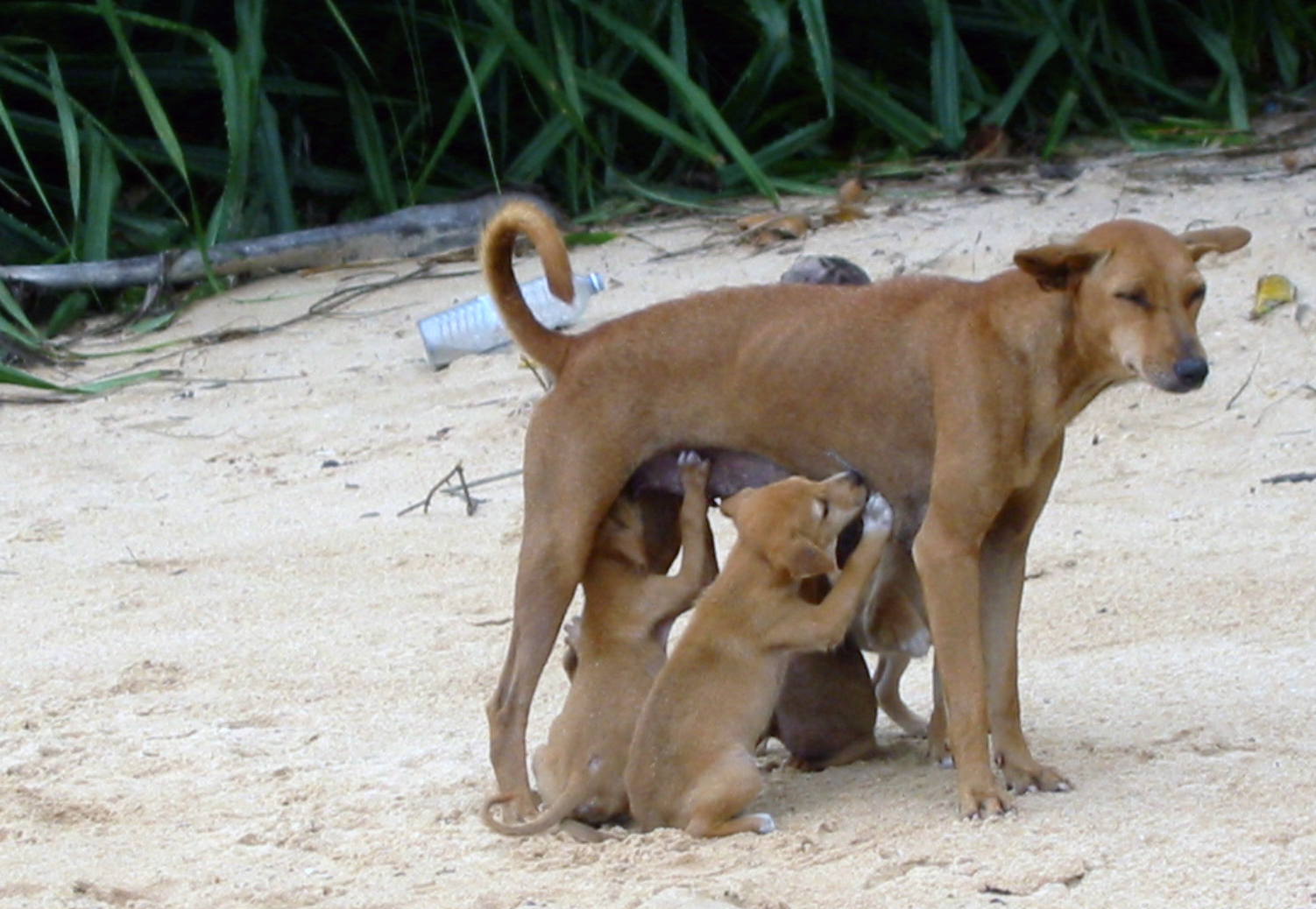
In Sri Lanka

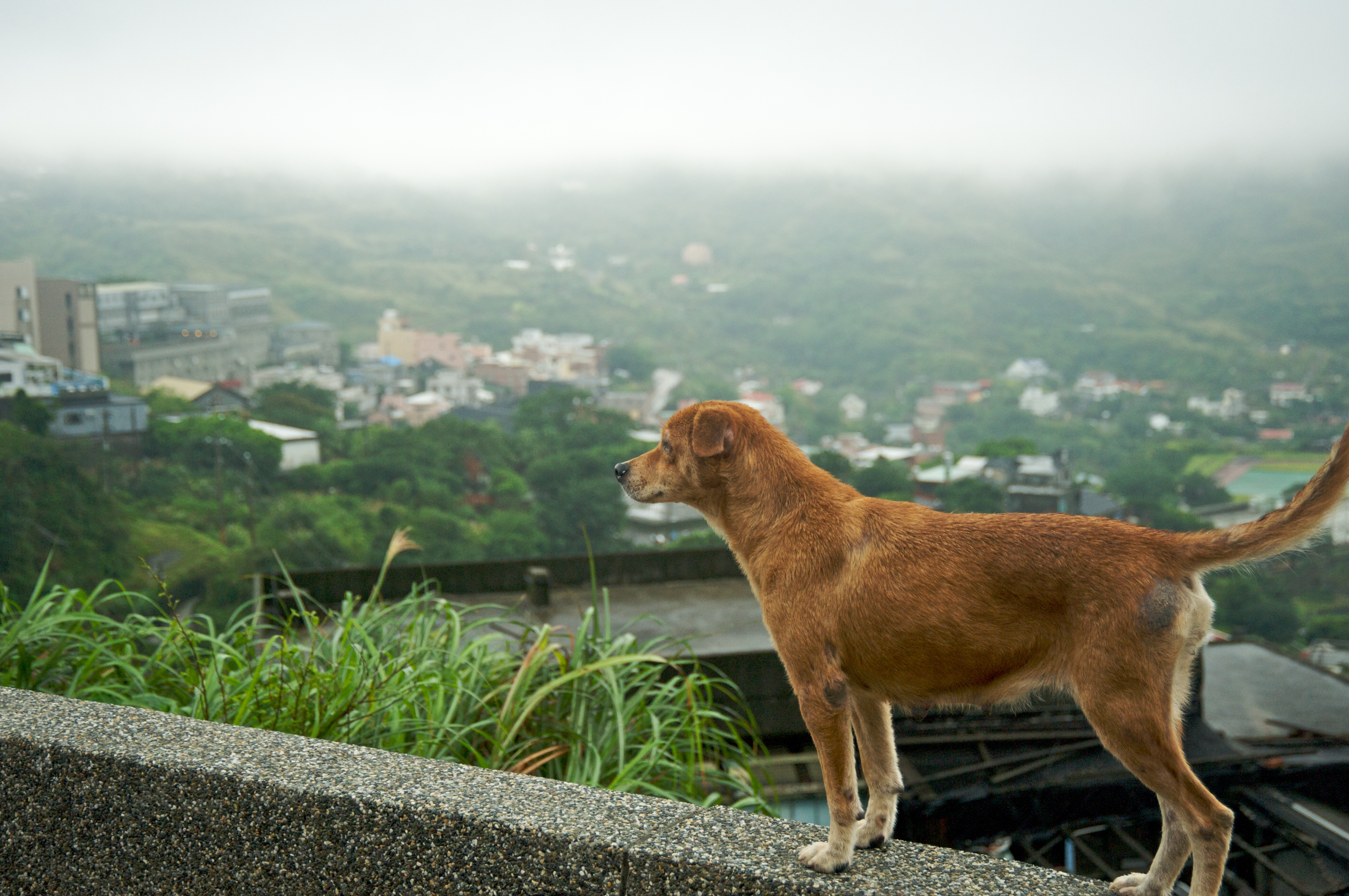
In Taiwan

== See also ==
- Indian pariah dog
- Sinhala Hound
