= Old German herding dogs =

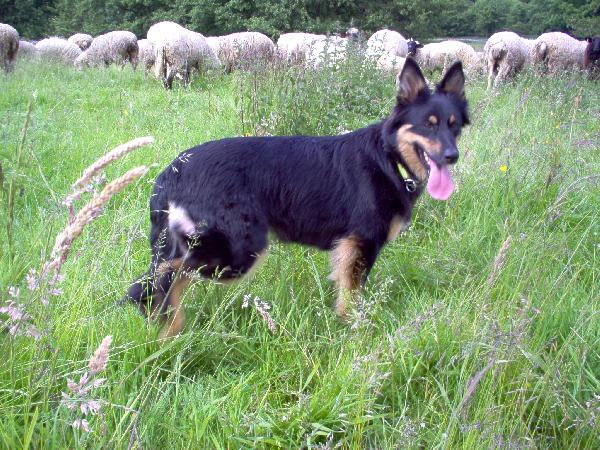
- Old German herding dog, landrace: Ost- bzw. mitteldeutsche Gelbbacke ('east- or central-German yellow-cheek')
- Other names: Altdeutsche Hütehunde, altdeutsche Schäferhunde
- Origin: Germany

Old German herding dogs (German: altdeutsche Hütehunde), including old German sheep dogs or old German shepherd dogs (altdeutsche Schäferhunde) are a group of traditional types of working, herding dogs from Germany. They are landraces consisting of working strains of dog, and some of them are the types from which the modern German Shepherd was developed as a standardised breed. The landraces are not recognised by the Fédération Cynologique Internationale, but some have their own standards which are for working ability, not appearance traits.

== History ==
The origins of the old German herding dogs likely trace back to the early Middle Ages. As shepherding and herding practices evolved, so did need for dogs capable of herding sheep, pigs, and cattle, as well as for guarding and protecting the herds. Dogs were being bred to preserve traits that assisted in their job of herding sheep and protecting their flocks from predators. In Germany this was practised within local communities, where shepherds selected and bred dogs. It was recognised that the breed had the necessary skills for herding sheep, such as intelligence, speed, strength and keen sense of smell. The results were dogs that were able to do such things, but that differed significantly, both in appearance and ability, from one locality to another.

Before the 1890s, any dog used for herding and protecting sheep in Germany was referred to as a "German shepherd dog". The dogs were bred solely for their working ability, with little effort to standardise a particular appearance or create a defined breed of dog. In 1899, ex-cavalry captain Max von Stephanitz was attending a dog show when he was shown a dog that fulfilled what von Stephanitz believed a working dog should be. He purchased him immediately. After purchasing the dog he changed the dog's name to Horand von Grafrath and von Stephanitz founded the Verein für Deutsche Schäferhunde (Society for German Shepherd Dogs). Horand was declared to be the first German Shepherd Dog. However, many German herdsmen continued to breed their dogs for working ability rather than to the new breed standard, and their remaining non-standardised working dogs were called Altdeutscher Schäferhund (plural with -hunde), literally 'old-German shepherd-dog'.

Under the Verein für Deutsche Schäferhunde (Society for the German Shepherd Dog), the long-haired variant of the German Shepherd was not accepted until 2009. Since 2010, the long-haired type has been accepted. Meanwhile, shepherds, farmers, and other owners of the threatened landraces who were attempting to standardise their varieties renamed the altdeutschen Schäferhunde ('old German shepherd dogs') umbrella term to altdeutsche Hütehunde ('old German herding dogs', literally 'old-German herd-dogs'). Other old landraces herding dogs, used for cattle rather than sheep, and which are not ancestors of the modern German Shepherd (including "zott"-coated dogs,, cow-dogs), were also encompassed within the generic category altdeutsche Hütehunde.

== Appearance ==
Another east- or central-German yellow-cheek, in 1920

Today's old German herding dogs differ scarcely from the landraces of the 19th and the early 20th century. Their breed standards (when they exist) require that the animal has to be capable of herding sheep and cattle but seldom prescribe physical appearance, though it is forbidden by these registries to cross-breed them with dogs of other breeds. It is unclear to what extent these standardisation efforts are having an effect. In 2008, the German Society for the Conservation of Old and Endangered Livestock Breeds (GEH) listed these varieties as "extremely vulnerable" to extinction.

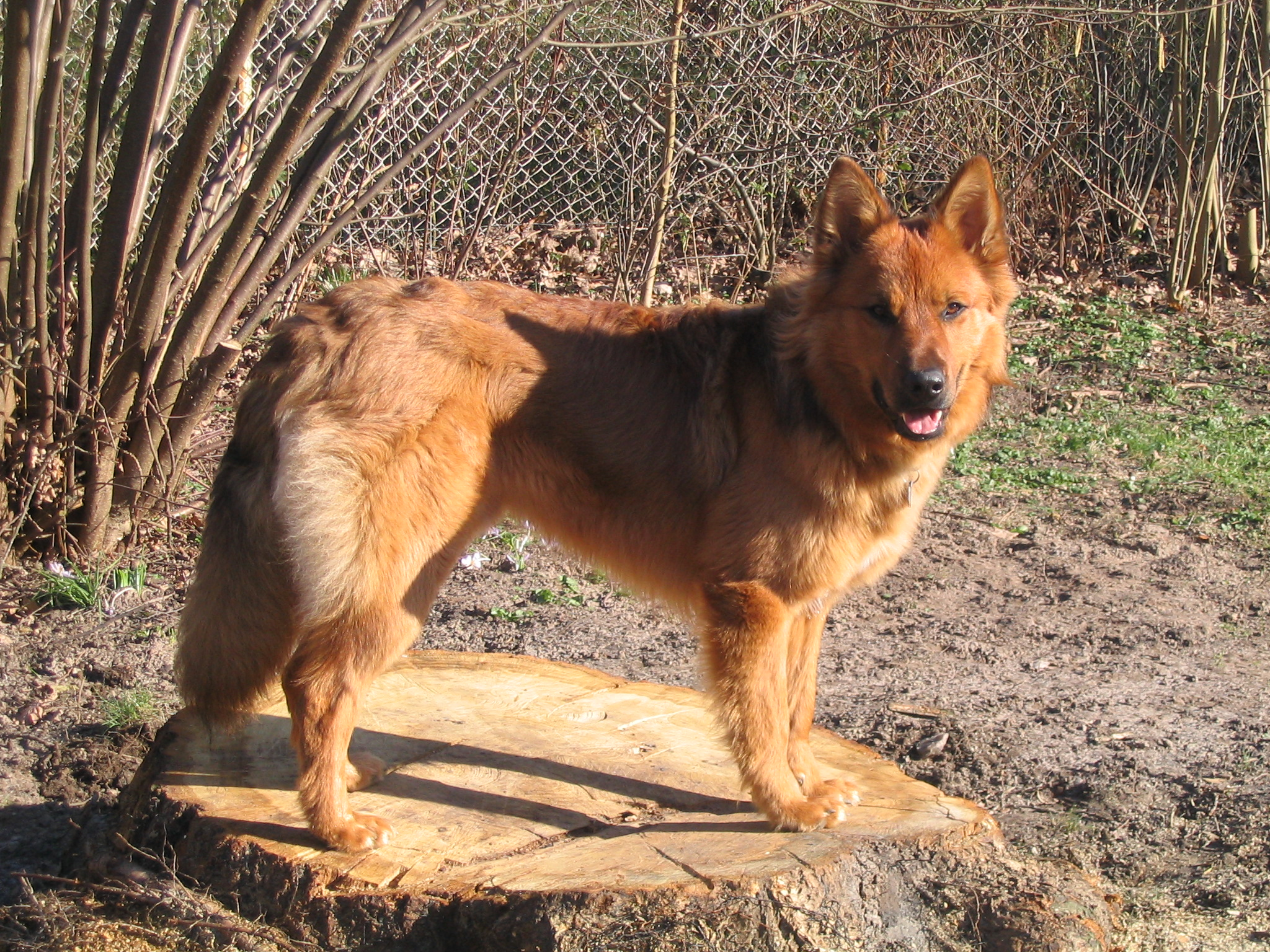
German: Harzer Fuchs ('Harz fox')

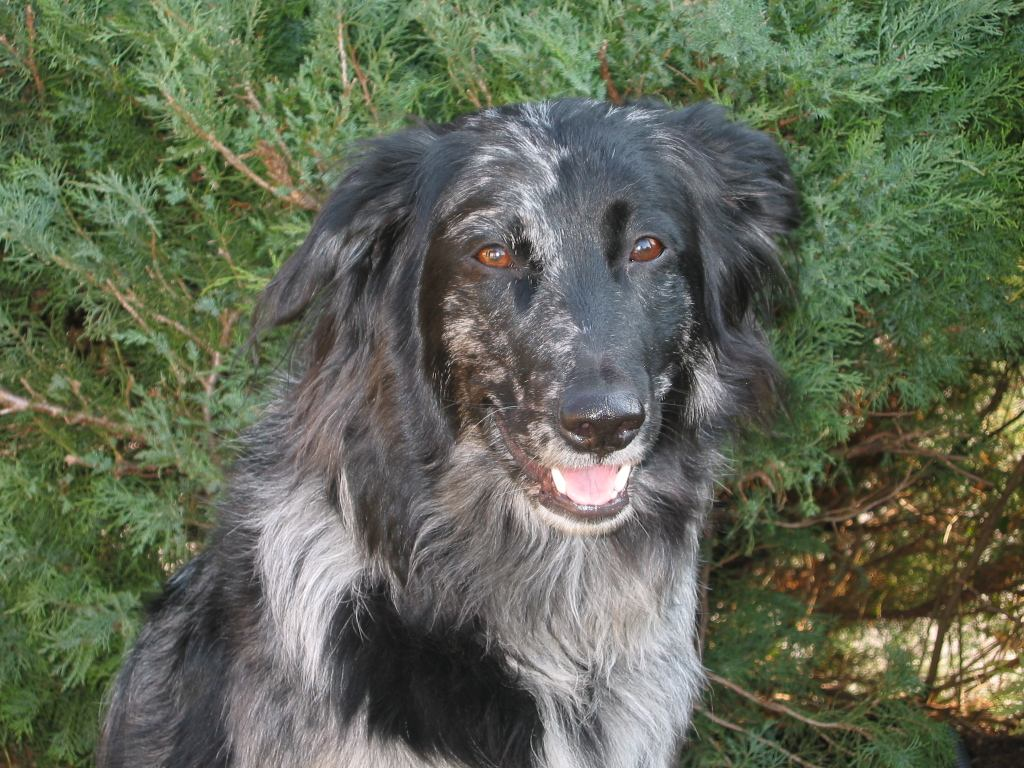
German: Tiger

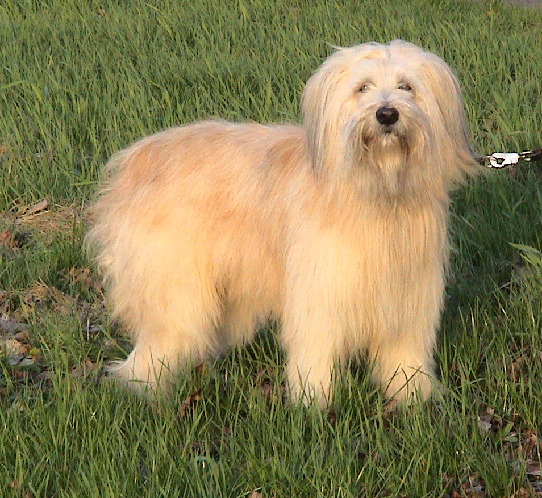
German: Schafpudel ('sheep-poodle')

The named landraces for which breed standards have been created are divided into sub-groups, first after the livestock they herd, in cow dogs and sheep dogs; second by region (into south-German, or east- and central-German), and more finely by coat type and other features. Most of these have no name in English; approximate translations are shown (note that German capitalises all nouns, but no adjectives, even when derived from proper nouns):

- Kuhhunde, 'cow-dogs'
  - Westerwälder (referring to the Westerwald mountains)
  - Siegerländer (referring to the Siegerland region)
- Schafhunde, 'sheep-dogs'
  - süddeutscher Typ, 'south-German type'
    - süddeutsche Gelbbacke, 'south-German yellow-cheek' – black and tan
    - süddeutscher Schwarzer, 'south-German black'
    - Tiger, 'tiger[-patterned]' – merle-colored coat; common in south Germany, rarer elsewhere
  - ost- bzw. mitteldeutscher Typ, 'east- or central-German type'
    - ost- bzw. mitteldeutsche Gelbbacke, 'east- or central-German yellow-cheek'
    - ost- bzw. mitteldeutscher Schwarzer, 'east- or central-German black'
    - ost- bzw. mitteldeutscher Fuchs, 'east- or central-German fox[-coloured]' – reddish)
      - harzer Fuchs, 'Harz fox' – reddish sheep-dogs from the Harz)
  - zotthaariger Typ [scraggy type] – long and raw-coated dogs similar to the Old English Sheepdog or Briard breeds
    - Strobel [lit. 'scrubby'] – a south-German type
    - Schafpudel, 'sheep-poodle' – a north- and central-German type

In the 19th century, there existed more of these landraces. Some of them became part of the modern German Shepherd Dog breed, while others became extinct in the course of time. The German: pommerscher Hütehund ('Pomeranian sheep-dog') and the German: Hütespitz ('herding spitz') were also counted among Old German herding dogs. They became extinct in the second half of the 20th century. The Pomeranian landrace was used to strengthen the Great Pyrenees, the Polish Tatra Sheepdog, the Kuvasz and similar now-standardised breeds. It is assumed that the last of the herding spitz landrace, which were mostly white and medium-sized, became part of the foundation stock of the White Shepherd breed. There may be other surviving landraces, not subject to any attempts to establish breed standards.

== See also ==
- List of dog breeds
- Bohemian Shepherd dog
- Garafian Shepherd dog
- Galician Shepherd Dog
