= The German Shepherd Dog in Word and Picture =

1923 book

- Author: Max von Stephanitz
- Language: English
- Publication date: 1923
- Pages: 712

The German Shepherd Dog in Word and Picture is a book first published in 1923. The book is a revised translation from German into English of Der deutsche Schäferhund in Wort und Bild which was written by Max von Stephanitz (the founder of the German Shepherd Dog breed) and first published in 1901 as a 72-page booklet (plus 24 pages of advertising). Der deutsche Schäferhund in Wort und Bild was subsequently expanded with later editions, and a complete makeover was published in 1921 with the sixth edition. A seventh edition of the German book was published in the same year as the first editions in English, 1923.

The German Shepherd Dog in Word and Picture was originally translated into English by Rev. C. Charke and revised by J. Schwabacher. There was an American Edition whose copyright-holder was John Gans, Esq, and an English Edition whose copyright-holder was Major C. E. W. Beddoes. Second revised editions in English were published in 1925. The books were printed in Germany by Anton Kämpfe, Jena.

The release of the first English-language editions was heralded thus:

The Schafer-hund, or Alsatian wolf-dog, to give him his English name, has become such a favorite In Great Britain that he has ceased to be looked upon as an enemy alien. A book which should tell us all about him was, therefore, bound to come, and here it is. Major Beddoes, a British officer who has served three years in Germany since the Armistice and has devoted much attention to the breeding and training of these dogs, has translated and edited the classical work on the subject written by Captain Stephanitz in "The German Shepherd Dog." The Germans had learnt long before the war the value of the Schafer-hund for police purposes, but it was during the war that he came Into his own. They mobilised everything, from copper candlesticks to draught oxen, and the Schafer-hund was "called up" for service on the front. He was detailed to search for wounded, to carry messages, to transport small-arm ammunition, to act as a ration party to outlying posts cut off by barrage or machine-gun fire, to do sentry duty, and to run out field telephone cable. In peace time he is equally useful. It Is quite common on small, lonely farms In Southern Germany to find the peasant and his wife far away at work in the fields while the dog is left at home to "mind the baby." And admirably does he do it. Major Beddoes tells us that he never locked his rooms in his hotel, but, if a friend happened to call, the master would return to find the friend standing in the hall unable either to advance or retreat, with the dog lying quietly in front of him, ears cocked and eyes alert. Everything was quite all right so long as the visitor did not move, but if he did, a premonitory growl advised him that it was better to remain where he was. The dog conveyed a plain intimation that the hall was the place for visitors to wait. A remarkable characteristic of these dogs is the way they learn for themselves. A gentlemen, who had had such a dog but a few days, one evening began to unlace his boots when the dog suddenly trotted off to the sleeping room and came back with his slippers. Beddoes declares that he has never seen a case of harsh treatment at the numerous training schools he has attended in Germany. Shyness or cringing in the show ring is alone sufficient to disqualify a dog in that country. The author of this book, Captain Stephanitz, who is the premier Judge at German shows, states that when he had, at a championship show, to judge three dogs of equal merit he caused a revolver to be fired close behind them. He disqualified two for being shy. The third dog looked sharply to see where the report came from and prepared to attack the firer. He won the prize.

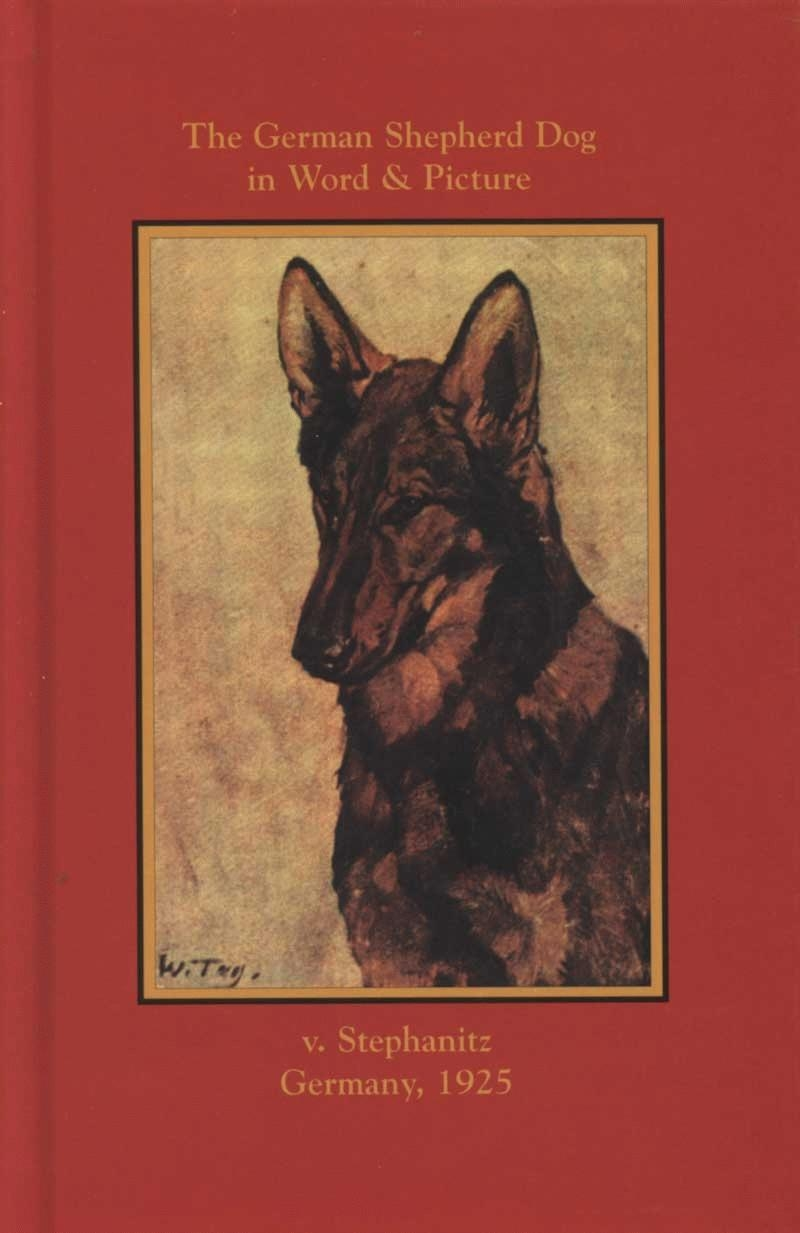
Cover of The German Shepherd Dog in Word and Picture, Reprint by Hoflin Publishing Ltd, c. 1994

An eighth edition of Der deutsche Schäferhund in Wort und Bild in German was published by the Verein für deutsche Schäferhunde (Society for German Shepherd Dogs) in 1932. This was followed in 1950 by a book with the abbreviated title in English, The German Shepherd Dog by Capt. von Stephanitz and also published by the Verein für deutsche Schäferhunde as the "8th Revised and Enlarged Edition".

The first English Edition of The German Shepherd Dog in Word and Picture (1923) has been reprinted by Home Farm Books (2009) in hardcover (ISBN 144465554X) and paperback (ISBN 1444654985). The second American Edition (1925) has been reprinted by Hoflin Publishing Ltd (1994) in hardcover (ISBN 9993280054). Hoflin Publishing Ltd also reprinted the book as a "Deluxe Limited Edition" in 1982.
