= Fred Lanting =

Canine judge (born 1936)

- Born: December 22, 1936 (age 89)
- Occupation: Canine judge
- Known for: Author: The Total German Shepherd Dog and Canine Hip Dysplasia and Other Orthopedics Disorders
- Website: fredlanting.org

Fred Lanting is a multi-breed American Kennel Club (AKC) judge, United Kennel Club (UKC) all breed judge and handler as well as other show organizations in the U.S. and abroad. He is best known for being the author of "The Total German Shepherd Dog" and "Canine Hip Dysplasia and Other Orthopedics Disorders". He also tours the world conducting lectures and seminars on canine health as well as judging UKC, Sieger, and other registry shows.

== Early German Shepherd career ==
Lanting owned his first German Shepherd Dog in 1947, but did not begin breeding them until 1966, when he moved to Toledo, Ohio. He also began showing his dogs in obedience and breed conformation trials. He started to get the attention of other owners and he was often hired to handle their dogs in both rings. He spent most weekends during the 1960s and 1970s showing dogs in the Great Lakes region of the US and Canada.

== AKC judge ==
In 1979, Lanting began judging AKC shows. He was AKC-licensed to judge German Shepherds, Rottweilers, Boxers, greyhounds, and whippets and later got international judging licenses from national kennel clubs overseas. He has judged and lectured in more than 30 countries.

A letter to AKC dated May 6, 2000, from Darrell Hayes asked for an explanation of Lanting's alleged advertising in the February 2000 Plumb Creek show in Colorado. Lanting had placed information about a colleague in Pakistan who was looking to import a working Rottweiler and a Labrador Retriever to improve the gene pools in that country. AKC claimed that Lanting was using his judging privileges to his advantage and was in violation of AKC's "no trafficking" rule ("buy, sell, and in any way trade in or traffic in dogs as a means of livelihood in whole or in part” (Chapter 7, Section 1, Rules, March 2001)). Lanting denies these allegations, stating his sole motive was to altruistically help serious breeders in that country to improve their dogs.

On May 15, 2000, the AKC temporarily suspended Lanting's judging privileges and in November 2000 he was suspended indefinitely. At the February 10, 2006, board of directors meeting, the board received a request from Lanting for reinstatement. The board voted to reinstate his AKC judging privileges effective May 15, 2015.

== Non AKC Judging ==
Fred still judges SV / Sieger style shows (German shepherds). He is also approved to judge for the KC (UK) German shepherds, Rottweilers, Boxers, Whippets, Greyhounds, and Shibas as well as a UKC all-breed judge. Fred is currently an internationally licensed judge with the Dog Club of China and an internationally licensed all breed conformation judge for several other registries.

== Seminars ==
Fred currently conducts seminars on canine hip dysplasia (and other orthopedic issues) including genetic prevention, nutrition, diagnosis and treatment, and more. He also presents seminars on an analytical approach to evaluating dogs (from picking puppies to conformation judging), Schutzhund training and problem solving, anatomy, and the evolution of the American German Shepherd Dog.

== Published works ==
- The Total German Shepherd Dog
- Canine Hip Dysplasia and Other Orthopedic Problems
