= Horand von Grafrath =

First German Shepherd dog (1895–c.1900)

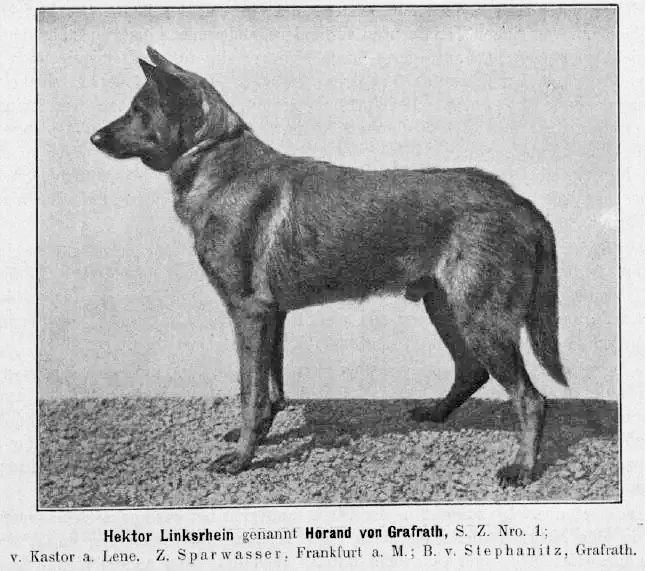
- Horand von Grafrath circa 1899
- Breed: German Shepherd Dog
- Sex: Male
- Born: Hektor Linksrhein; January 1, 1895; Frankfurt, Germany
- Owner: Max von Stephanitz

Horand von Grafrath (1 January 1895 – date of death unknown) (formerly Hektor Linksrhein) was the first German Shepherd dog and the genetic basis for modern German Shepherds.

== Early life ==
Horand was born on 1 January 1895, in Frankfurt, Germany. Bred by Friedrich Sparwasser of Sparwasser Kennels, he was born from the same litter as Sparwasser's famous dog, Luchs. Then named Hektor, Horand was a Thuringian shepherd dog, from Thuringia, a state in Germany known for dogs bred for a greyish, wolf-like appearance and tall, erect ears. Horand von Grafrath was sired (fathered) by Kastor (1), the son of the championship dog Pollux (1), and whelped (mothered) by Lene (Sparwasser). Horand had a grey-yellow sable coat.

Sold by Sparwasser to an unnamed third party, Horand was purchased by Anton Eiselen of Eiselen Kennels. Eiselen brought Horand to a dog show also attended by Max von Stephanitz, who purchased the dog for his breeding program, which sought to combine the best characteristics of the Thuringian shepherds from the North with the Württemberg shepherds of the South. Horand was the first dog to be officially registered as a new breed called the German Shepherd Dog (registration number SZ1). Horand was not the only dog to sire pups that were to become the breed known as German Shepherds, because many dogs were registered at that time, including his brother Luchs (SZ155), his parents (SZ153 and SZ156), and paternal grandparents (SZ151 and SZ154). However, Horand's heirs went on to dominate in dog shows and championships, and nearly all modern German Shepherds can either directly or indirectly trace their lineage back to him.

== History ==
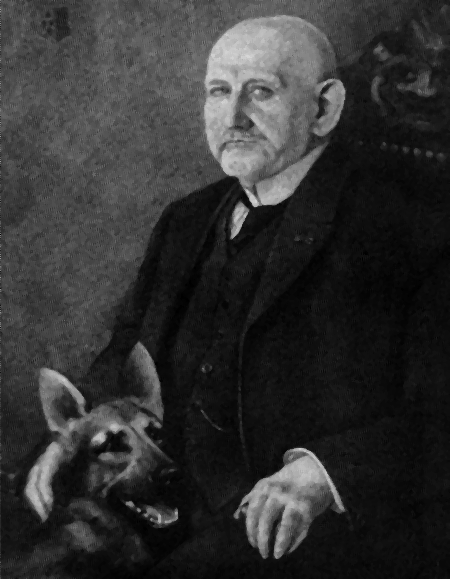
Max von Stephanitz and Horand von Grafrath, c. 1900

Throughout history, dogs have been kept for the purpose of working on a specific task, and one of the most common tasks was herding sheep. Through selective breeding, dogs were bred to increase the traits that were beneficial for performing their specific task, which led to the species becoming one of the most diverse to ever exist. European breeders paid little attention to the dog's appearance until the late 16th century, when people in aristocracy began keeping them as pets. By the Victorian age of the 19th century, pet dogs had become commonplace in addition to working dogs, and dog shows and competitions had become popular events.

The sheep dogs in Germany were just as diverse; from lanky, curly-haired dogs to burly, floppy-eared dogs. The shepherds of Thuringia preferred to breed their dogs for a wolf-like appearance, with grey coloring, a slender snout, and erect ears. During the late 19th century, people began to create standardized breeds for their countries, and Germany was quick to follow.

A society named the Phylax Society was formed in Germany in 1891, with the intention of standardising dog breeds. The society disbanded in 1894, but many of the members continued to exhibit the ideologies promoted by the society. One of these members was Captain Max von Stephanitz, the man now credited with being the father of the German Shepherd Dog. In 1899, while attending a show, von Stephanitz was shown a dog named Hektor Linksrhein. Von Stephanitz was so impressed by Hektor's intelligence, strength and obedience that he purchased the dog for 200 German gold marks. Von Stephanitz disagreed with the Phylax Society's desire to breed dogs for their physical appearance and commercial value, stating that commercial breeders tended to breed "the fancy dog" for monetary gain while neglecting the health and betterment of the breed, and preferred amateur breeders who bred for intelligence and working value. Upon purchasing the dog, he immediately formed the Verein für Deutsche Schäferhunde (Society for German Shepherd Dogs). Von Stephanitz admired the dog for its "obedient fidelity to [its] master." Von Stephanitz changed Hektor's name to Horand von Grafrath and included him as the center-point of the society's breeding programs. The dog was then registered under a new breed registry, thus making Horand von Grafrath the first German Shepherd Dog.

Many breeders of the time idolized Horand as the goal of what a well-rounded working dog should be.

There have been statements that some of the early pre-German Shepherds were part wolf, although these have been rejected by von Stephanitz, who found such claims unlikely due to the dogs' build, friendly nature, love of children, and obedient characteristics.

== Temperament ==
Horand's temperament reflects the characteristics for which the breed is known. A sensitive dog with an inquisitive and playful nature, and a highly intelligent dog, they can be prone to mischief when bored, but are motivated and energetic with good threat-assessment skills and family bonds. Von Stephanitz described him as:

...a gentleman with a boundless zest for living. Although untrained in his puppyhood, nevertheless obedient to the slightest nod when at his master's side; but when left to himself, the maddest rascal, the wildest ruffian and an incorrigible provoker of strife. Never idle, always on the go, well-disposed to harmless people, but no cringer, mad on children and always in love. What could not have become of such a dog, if we only had at that time military or police service training? His faults were the failings of his upbringing, and never of his stock. He suffered from a suppressed, or better, a superfluity of unemployed energy, for he was in heaven when someone was occupied with him, and then he was the most tractable of dogs.

== Breeding ==
Horand sired many pups. His most celebrated offspring was Hektor von Schwaben, who later produced Heinz von Starkenburg, Beowolf, and Pilot. These three studs were used in later breeding programs; their progeny are thus the ancestors of all modern German Shepherd Dogs.

== See also ==
- List of individual dogs
