= Panda German Shepherds =

Rare mutation in a dog breed

Panda German Shepherds are German Shepherd dogs that exhibit a rare genetic mutation that causes white spotting in the traditionally non-white marked breed.

== Genetics ==
The first ever recorded Panda mutation occurred spontaneously in a female dog, Lewcinka's Franka von Phenom, in 2000.

A study published by UCDavis in 2016 found that the Panda marking is the result of dominant mutation of the KIT gene, or the CD117 gene. DNA tested conducted by the American Kennel Club proved her lineage to be, for a fact, a pure German Shepherd Dog.

Panda is a dominant gene. In its homozygous state, the mutation is considered embryonic lethal as no live dog has been observed with it.

== Controversy ==
Due to fact that any white markings is considered a fault for showing, many German Shepherd fanciers assume that this color as a result of crossbreeding to Collies or similar breeds. Many traditional breeders also believe that this color is from inferior stock, and that many breeders of this coloration are going against the GSDCA Code of Ethics.
