= Zuyaqui =

Mexican drug-hunting dog

Zuyaqui (died 2000s) was a dog who, according to SEDENA, was the dog who found the most drugs in Mexican military and police history.

Zuyaqui was a German Shepherd dog. He gained fame as his exploits became known on international media.

After Zuyaqui's death, his body was dissected and is preserved at the Museo del Enervante, where it is positioned as if he was watching drug dealers' confiscated belongings.

Between 2000 and 2010, Mexican police trained 1,800 dogs to perform jobs similar to Zuyaqui's.

== See also ==
- Mick the Miller - Irish-British race dog who is displayed at museum
- Frida - Mexican human rescuing dog
- List of individual dogs
