= Frida (dog) =

Mexican rescue dog (2009–2022)

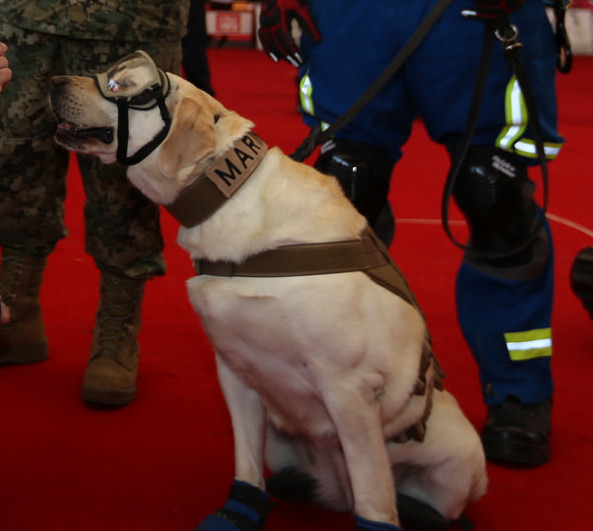
- Frida in 2017
- Species: Canis familiaris
- Breed: Labrador Retriever
- Sex: Female
- Born: 12 April 2009
- Died: 15 November 2022 (aged 13)
- Occupation: Search and rescue dog
- Employer: Mexican Navy

Frida (12 April 2009 – 15 November 2022) was a yellow Labrador Retriever who worked as a search and rescue dog for the Mexican Navy (SEMAR). She was deployed to help the rescue efforts in the aftermath of natural disasters. Equipped with protective goggles, harness and boots, she was trained to bark if she detected someone in need of help.

During her service with the Mexican Navy, she took part in 55 rescue operations. She was deployed to Haiti following the 2010 earthquake, where she is credited with locating 12 survivors. She gained international recognition following the 2017 Puebla earthquake in Mexico.

== Career ==
Frida's first deployment was in response to the catastrophic magnitude 7.0 M_{w} earthquake that struck Haiti on 12 January 2010. On that occasion, she detected 12 survivors and a further 12 deceased persons.

Following a gas-leak explosion at the Pemex Executive Tower (Pemex Tower) in Mexico City on 31 January 2013, which killed at least 37 people, Frida located eight bodies. In April 2017, Frida was deployed to Guaranda, Ecuador, to assist in rescue work following a landslide; she located 20 bodies.

In September 2017, two devastating earthquakes struck Mexico: one with a magnitude of 8.2 M_{w} on 7 September, centred off the coast of Chiapas, and the second on 19 September with a magnitude of 7.1 M_{w}, epicentred in the state of Puebla. Deployed in response to both, Frida located three bodies. It was during the response to the second quake, in which Mexico City was particularly badly affected, that Frida came to the attention of the media and the public.

While some reports claim that she was instrumental in saving more than 52 lives, the navy states that during her career she was responsible for saving 12 lives and finding the remains of 43 deceased persons.

Her trainer and handler was Petty Officer 2nd Class Israel Arauz Salinas (as of October 2018).

== Recognition and retirement ==
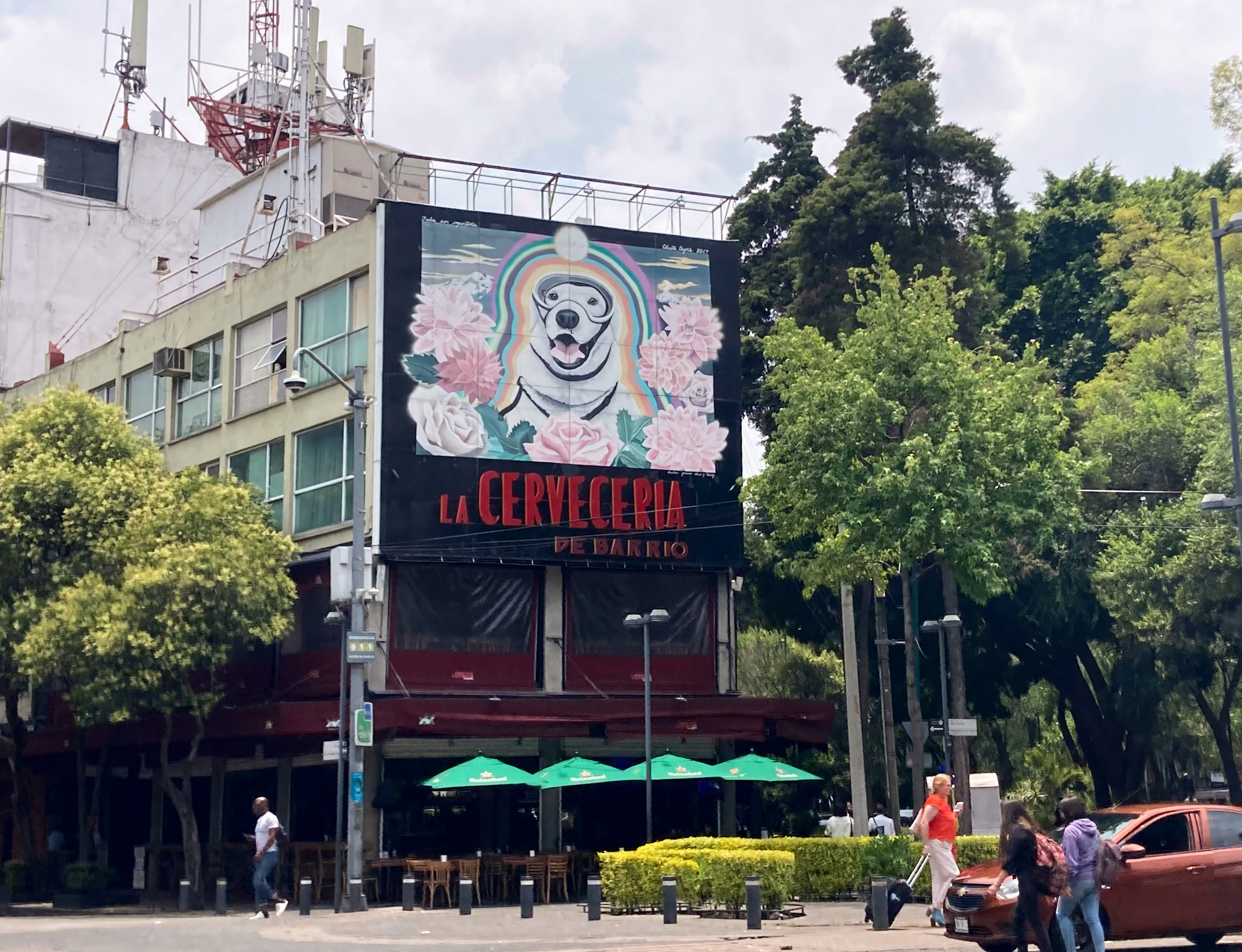
Mural commemorating Frida in Roma Norte, Mexico City

On 19 July 2018, Frida and her handler were honoured with a statue in the city of Puebla, where she attended the unveiling ceremony. A second statue of Frida was unveiled by Secretary of the Navy José Rafael Ojeda Durán at the naval compound in Coyoacán, Mexico City, on 6 October 2022. The statues are not the only artworks that celebrate Frida's heroic actions and achievements: as a social media star and national icon, Frida was featured in fan art, on t-shirts, in comic books, and in a large colourful mural in Mexico City's Roma neighbourhood painted by artist Celeste Byers. In January 2018, her iconic boots (and her handler's) were donated to Mexico City's El Borceguí Footwear Museum.

Frida retired from rescue work on 25 June 2019 but remained in service helping to train other dogs until she died on 15 November 2022, at age 13. Following a ceremony in homage to her, Frida's ashes were interred at the base of her statue in Coyoacán.

== See also ==
- Zuyaqui, an accomplished Mexican sniffer dog
- List of individual dogs
