= Phylax Society =

German dog-breeding society, 1891–1895

The Phylax Society was a prototypical dog club pre-dating the German Shepherd dog, formed with the intention of creating a standardized German dog breed.

== Establishment ==
Throughout the nineteenth century Europe, unofficial groups had been operating to selectively breed dogs with profound qualities. While distinct breeds were being established, they often differed dramatically, both in appearance and utility, across localities. As a result, in 1891 the Phylax Society (Phylax being Greek for "guardsman") was formed with the intention of creating a standardised German dog breed by hand-picking, from sheep dogs belonging to local German shepherds, those that displayed superior qualities than those of other dogs.

== Disestablishment ==
The official existence of the Phylax Society was short lived. Early in the group's history, there was constant bickering regarding the desired traits of what would become the German Shepherd Dog. Some of the members felt aesthetics were not important in a dog breed, instead desiring that the dog be useful as a working breed, rather than having a pleasing look. Other members preferred that the dog be bred more for beauty with less of a focus on having a working breed. This argument was never settled and after numerous attempts to breed the German Shepherd dog failed by producing dogs with little to no utility, many of the members left; resulting in the Phylax Society disbanding in 1894, only four years after its establishment.

== Post–Phylax Society ==
Although the Phylax Society had disbanded, many former members continued in attempts to breed a dog with superior qualities. It was due to the original formation of the Phylax Society that Max von Stephanitz was inspired to form the Verein für Deutsche Schäferhunde (Society for the German Shepherd Dog) in 1899, which ultimately led to the creation of the modern German Shepherd Dog breed.
