= Museo del Enervante =

Mexican museum

The Museo del Enervante is a Mexican museum. It is also known popularly as the Narco Museo, Museo del Narco and other nicknames. It is also known, officially, as Museo del Enervantes de la Secretaria de la Defensa Nacional (Sedena).

== History ==
The museum was established in 1985.

== Displays ==
The museum offers different displays of artifacts that belonged to notorious Mexican drug traffickers, and to Jesus Malverde, the so-called "saint of Mexican drug dealers".

There is a dissected body of a dog named "Zuyaqui", who in life was the dog that detected the most drugs in Mexican Military history; and items belonging to Daniel Perez Rojas, Benjamin Arellano Felix and Javier Torres Felix, among others.

== Other information ==
The museum is located at Colonia Lomas de Sotelo, Miguel Hidalgo, Mexico City, but it is not open to the public. Only military personnel, journalists, and certain students are allowed to visit.
