= Secretariat of National Defense =

National Defense of Mexico

- Secretaría de la Defensa Nacional
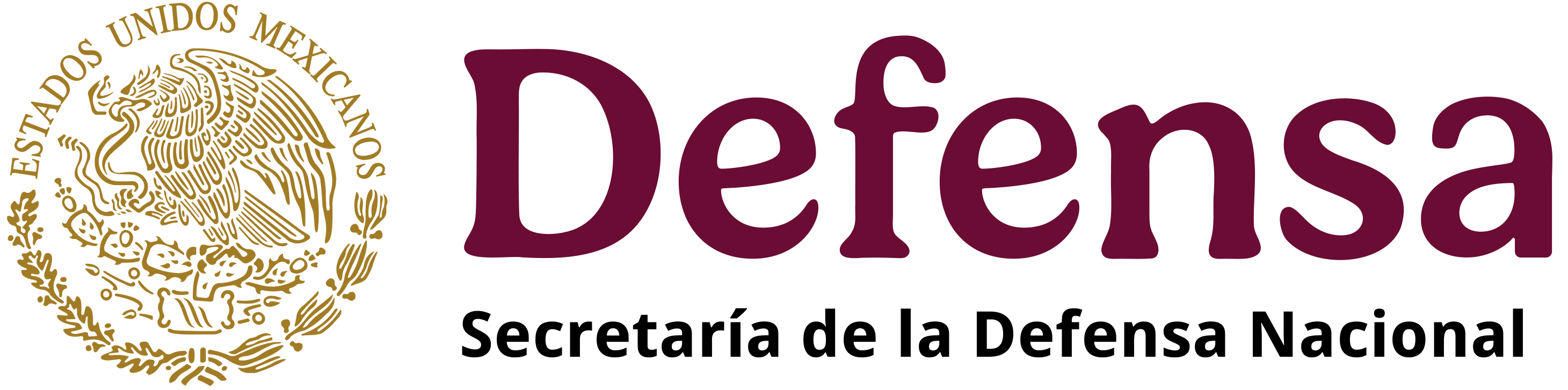
- Logo during the 2024-2030 administration

Secretariat overview
- Formed: 1821; 205 years ago
- Preceding Secretariat: Secretariat of War and Navy
- Jurisdiction: Government of Mexico
- Headquarters: Boulevard Manuel Ávila Camacho S/N. Esq. Av. Ind. Mil. Col. Lomas de Sotelo; Alcaldía Miguel Hidalgo Mexico City, 11200; 19°26′25″N 99°12′57″W
- Motto: Honor y Lealtad
- Employees: 440,164
- Annual budget: $199 b MXN (2022)
- Minister responsible: Ricardo Trevilla Trejo, Secretary of National Defense
- Child Secretariat: National Guard
- Website: www.gob.mx/sedena

The Secretariat of National Defense (Spanish: Secretaría de la Defensa Nacional, SEDENA) is the Mexican government department responsible for managing Mexico's Army and Air Forces. Its head is the Secretary of National Defense who, like the co-equal Secretary of the Navy, is directly answerable to the president. Before 1937, the position was called the Secretary of War and Navy (Secretaría de Guerra y Marina). The agency has its headquarters in Lomas de Sotelo, Miguel Hidalgo, Mexico City. Some key figures who answer directly to the Secretary are the Assistant Secretary, the Chief of Staff of the Armed Forces, and all military tribunals.

Alongside his role as a cabinet member the Secretary shares, since 2020, the official ex officio title of "Commanding General of the Mexican Army, Air Force, and National Guard" (Alto Mando del Ejercito, Fuerza Aerea, y Guardia Nacional).

== Role ==
Under the Federal Public Administration Act (Ley Orgánica de la Administración Pública Federal), the Secretary has the following duties, among others provided by the Constitution and relevant laws of Congress:

- Organize and administer affairs of the Army, Air Force and the National Guard and assist in their functions.
- Organize and assist in development and enforcement of National Military Service for the Army and Air Force.
- Management of the Army, Air Force, National Guard and armed contingents which do not belong to the state level national guard or law enforcement agencies.
- Plan, direct and handle mobilization of the country in the event of war; formulating and executing plans and orders necessary for national defense purposes, as well as directing and advising civil defense in both peacetime and wartime scenarios in coordination with the Army, Air Force and National Guard.
- Construct and prepare every kind of military buildings for Army and Air Force use, including forts and barracks, as well as administration of barracks, hospitals and other military buildings, as well as provide construction for buildings and bases of the National Guard and their administration and upkeep.
- Administer military justice, education and medical services as well as handle necessary benefits for personnel of the Army, Air Force and National Guard.
- Acquire and build armaments, ammunition, and all kinds of materials and elements for the use of Army and Air Force, as well as for the National Guard.
- Grant permission for an expedition force to enter another country or to allow another country to send their forces to Mexico, as well as for scientific activities conducted in Mexican territory by other nations or international organizations.
- Manage the issuing of licenses to bear firearms with the aim of preventing the use of arms expressly banned in law and also those types of arms restricted by the state for the exclusive use of the Army, Air Force, Navy and National Guard, with the exception of what is established by the 13th section of Article 30 of the Constitution, as well as the supervision and issuing of permits for the sale, transport and storage of firearms, chemical weapons, explosives and strategic weapons, as well as in the importation and exportation of the same.
- Contribute in construction of land and air-based communications lines together with other agencies of the Federal Government.
- Organize air-based SAR operations in times of emergency. (Article 80, Civil Aviation Law)

== List of secretaries ==
No.	Portrait	Name	Took office	Left office	Time in office	President
1	Pablo Quiroga Escamilla [es]	General de brigada Pablo Quiroga Escamilla (1875–1948)	1934	15 June 1935	0–1 years	Lázaro Cárdenas del Río
2	Andrés Figueroa Figueroa [es]	Andrés Figueroa Figueroa (1884–1936)	16 June 1935	17 October 1936 †	1 year, 123 days	Lázaro Cárdenas del Río
3	Manuel Ávila Camacho	Brigadier General; Manuel Ávila Camacho (1897–1955)	18 October 1936	31 January 1939	2 years, 105 days	Lázaro Cárdenas del Río
4	Jesús Agustín Castro [es]	General de División; Jesús Agustín Castro (1887–1953)	1 February 1939	30 November 1940	1 year, 303 days	Lázaro Cárdenas del Río
5	Jesús Agustín Castro [es]	Jesús Agustín Castro (1891–1975)	1 December 1940	31 August 1942	1 year, 273 days	Manuel Ávila Camacho
6	Lázaro Cárdenas	General de División; Lázaro Cárdenas (1895–1970)	1 September 1942	31 August 1945	2 years, 364 days	Manuel Ávila Camacho
7	Francisco L. Urquizo	General de División; Francisco L. Urquizo (1891–1969)	1 September 1945	30 November 1946	1 year, 90 days	Manuel Ávila Camacho
8	Gilberto R. Limón [es]	Gilberto R. Limón (1891–1988)	1 December 1946	30 November 1952	5 years, 365 days	Miguel Alemán
9	Matías Ramos [es]	General de División; Matías Ramos (1891–1962)	1 December 1952	30 November 1958	5 years, 365 days	Adolfo Ruiz Cortines
10	Agustín Olachea	General de División; Agustín Olachea (1890–1974)	1 December 1958	30 November 1964	5 years, 365 days	Adolfo López Mateos
11	Marcelino García Barragan [es]	General de División; Marcelino García Barragan (1895–1979)	1 December 1964	30 November 1970	5 years, 364 days	Gustavo Díaz Ordaz
12	Hermenegildo Cuenca Díaz [es]	Hermenegildo Cuenca Díaz (1902–1977)	1 December 1970	30 November 1976	5 years, 365 days	Luis Echeverría Álvarez
13	Félix Galván López [es]	General de División; Félix Galván López (1913–1988)	1 December 1976	30 November 1982	5 years, 364 days	José López Portillo
14	Juan Arévalo Gardoqui	General de División; Juan Arévalo Gardoqui (1921–2000)	1 December 1982	30 November 1988	5 years, 365 days	Miguel de la Madrid Hurtado
15	Antonio Riviello Bazán [es]	General de División; Antonio Riviello Bazán (1926–2017)	1 December 1988	30 November 1994	6 years, 0 days	Carlos Salinas de Gortari
16	Enrique Cervantes Aguirre [es]	General de División; Enrique Cervantes Aguirre (born 1935)	1 December 1994	30 November 2000	6 years, 0 days	Ernesto Zedillo
17	Gerardo Clemente Vega	General de División; Gerardo Clemente Vega (1940–2022)	1 December 2000	30 November 2006	6 years, 0 days	Vicente Fox
18	Guillermo Galván Galván	General de División; Guillermo Galván Galván (born 1943)	1 December 2006	30 November 2012	6 years, 0 days	Felipe Calderón
19	Salvador Cienfuegos	General de División; Salvador Cienfuegos (born 1948)	1 December 2012	30 November 2018	6 years, 0 days	Enrique Peña Nieto
20	Luis Cresencio Sandoval	General de División; Luis Cresencio Sandoval (born 1960)	1 December 2018	30 September 2024	5 years, 305 days	Andrés Manuel López Obrador
21	Ricardo Trevilla Trejo	General de División; Ricardo Trevilla Trejo (born 1961)	1 October 2024	Incumbent	2 years, 29 days	Claudia Sheinbaum

== See also ==
- Museo del Enervante – a Sedena museum dedicated to those who have fought drug trafficking in Mexico.
- Zuyaqui – a famous dog who worked for the agency.
