= German Shepherd =

German breed of dog

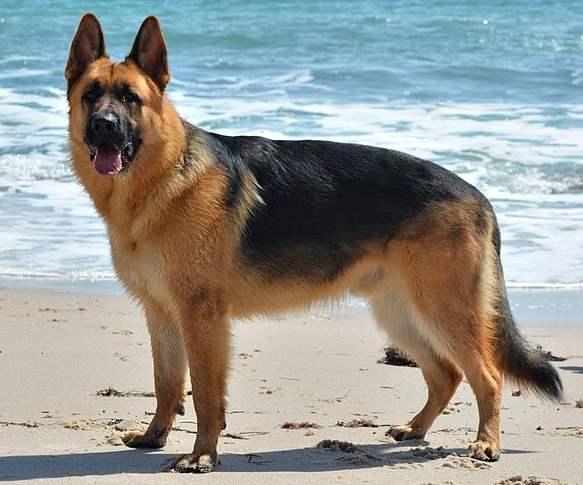
- Adult male
- Other names: German Shepherd Dog; Alsatian; Alsatian Wolf Dog; Deutscher Schäferhund; Altdeutsche Schäferhunde
- Origin: Germany
Traits
Height	Males	60–65 cm (24–26 in)
	Females	55–60 cm (22–24 in)
Weight	Males	30–40 kg (66–88 lb)
	Females	22–32 kg (49–71 lb)
- Coat: Double coat
- Colour: Tan with black saddle, sable, solid black or bi-colour
- Litter size: 6 to 8
Kennel club standards
- VDH: standard
- The Royal Kennel Club: standard
- Fédération Cynologique Internationale: standard

The German Shepherd, (Note: German: Deutscher Schäferhund, German pronunciation: [ˈdɔʏtʃɐ ˈʃɛːfɐˌhʊnt] ("German Shepherd Dog")) also known in Britain as an Alsatian, is a German breed of working dog of medium to large size. It is characterized by its intelligent and obedient nature.

It was developed in Germany from 1899 by Max von Stephanitz, using various traditional German herding dogs, and gained international recognition after the end of the First World War. It was bred as a herding dog, for herding sheep, but has since been used in many other types of work, including disability assistance, search-and-rescue, police work, and warfare. It is commonly kept as a companion dog, and is among the most frequently registered breeds world-wide.

== History ==
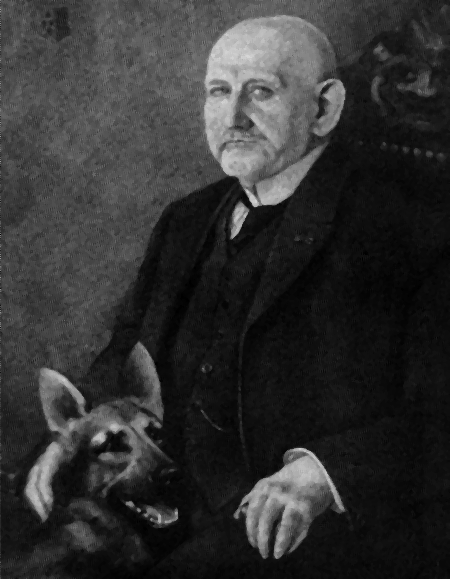
Max von Stephanitz, the founder of the breed (with Horand von Grafrath), circa 1900

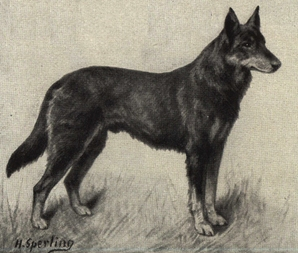
Illustration from 1909

=== 1890s ===
During the 1890s, attempts were being made to standardise dog breeds. Dogs were being bred to preserve traits that assisted in their job of herding sheep and protecting their flocks from predators. In Germany this was practised within local communities, where shepherds selected and bred dogs. It was recognised that the breed had the necessary skills for herding sheep, such as intelligence, speed, strength and keen sense of smell. The results were dogs that were able to do such things, but that differed significantly, both in appearance and ability, from one locality to another.

To combat these differences, the Phylax Society was formed in 1891 with the intention of creating standardised development plans for native dog breeds in Germany. The society disbanded after only three years due to ongoing internal conflicts regarding the traits in dogs that the society should promote; some members believed dogs should be bred solely for working purposes, while others believed dogs should be bred also for appearance. While unsuccessful in their goal, the Phylax Society had inspired people to pursue standardising dog breeds independently.

With the rise of large, industrialised cities in Germany, the predator population began to decline, rendering sheepdogs unnecessary. At the same time, the awareness of sheepdogs as a versatile, intelligent class of canine began to rise. Max von Stephanitz, an ex-cavalry captain and former student of the Berlin Veterinary College, was an ex-member of the Phylax Society who firmly believed dogs should be bred for working. He admired the intelligence, strength and ability of Germany's native sheepdogs, but could not find any one single breed that satisfied him as the perfect working dog.

=== 1900s ===
In 1899, von Stephanitz was attending a dog show when he was shown a dog named Hektor Linksrhein. Hektor was the product of a few generations of selective breeding and completely fulfilled what von Stephanitz believed a working dog should be. He was pleased with the strength of the dog and was so taken by the animal's intelligence, loyalty, and beauty, that he purchased him immediately. After purchasing the dog he changed his name to Horand von Grafrath and von Stephanitz founded the Verein für Deutsche Schäferhunde (Society for German Shepherd Dogs). Horand was declared to be the first German Shepherd Dog, and was the first dog added to the society's breed register. In just a few decades of the Verein für Deutsche Schäferhunde's establishment, the breed became one of the world's most popular and numerous, a position it has maintained to this day. By 1923, the Verein für Deutsche Schäferhunde claimed 50,000 dues-paying members in more than 500 branches in Germany alone.

Horand became the center-point of the breeding programs and was bred with dogs belonging to other society members that displayed desirable traits and with dogs from Thuringia, Franconia, and Württemberg. Fathering many pups, Horand's most prolific was Hektor von Schwaben. Hektor was inbred with another of Horand's offspring and produced Heinz von Starkenburg, Beowulf, and Pilot, who later sired a total of 84 pups, mostly through being inbred with Hektor's other offspring. This inbreeding was deemed necessary in order to fix the traits being sought in the breed. Beowulf's progeny also were inbred and it is from these pups that all German Shepherds draw a genetic link. The society is thought to have achieved its goal since von Stephanitz’s leadership is commonly credited as the creator of the German Shepherd Dog.

=== Twentieth century ===
During the first half of the twentieth century, the breed came to be strongly identified with Imperial and Nazi Germany, because of its association with purity and militarism. German Shepherds were coveted as "germanische Urhunde," being close to the wolf, and became very fashionable during the Nazi era. Adolf Hitler acquired a German Shepherd named "Prinz" in 1921, during his years of poverty, but he had been forced to lodge the dog elsewhere. However, she managed to escape and return to him. Hitler, who adored the loyalty and obedience of the dog, thereafter developed a great liking for the breed. Hitler kept several more of the breed, including Blondi, who was among several dogs in the 'Führerbunker' during the Battle of Berlin at the end of the Second World War. Dogs played a role in Nazi propaganda by portraying Hitler as an animal lover. Preparing for his suicide, Hitler ordered Dr. Werner Haase to test a cyanide capsule on Blondi, and the dog died as a result. Erna Flegel, a nurse who worked at the emergency casualty station in the Reich Chancellery stated in 2005 that Blondi's death had affected the people in the bunker more than Eva Braun's suicide. German Shepherds were also used widely as guard dogs at Nazi concentration camps during the Holocaust.

When the German Shepherd was introduced to the United States it was initially a popular dog, but as the dogs' popularity grew, it became associated as a dangerous breed owned by gangsters and bootleggers. The reputation of the German Shepherds as a dangerous breed had grown to such an extent that importing them was briefly banned in Australia in 1929. Potential legislation was even considered to require that all German shepherds in South Australia be sterilised.

=== Naming ===
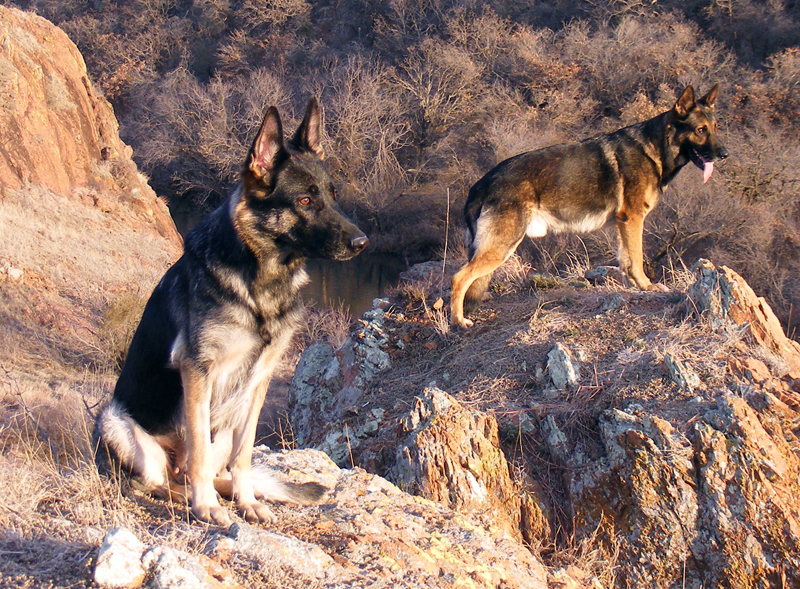
Sable bitch (left) and dog (right)

The breed was named Deutscher Schäferhund, by von Stephanitz, translating to "German Shepherd Dog." At the time, all other herding dogs in Germany were referred to by this name; they thus became known as Altdeutsche Schäferhunde, or old German herding dogs.

The direct translation of the name was adopted for use in the stud-book; however, at the end of the First World War, it was thought that use of the word "German" would harm the breed's popularity in countries that had fought Germany. The breed was officially renamed by the UK Kennel Club to "Alsatian Wolf Dog," after the French region of Alsace bordering Germany.

Eventually, the appendage "wolf dog" was dropped, after numerous campaigns by breeders who were worried that becoming known as a wolf-dog hybrid would affect the breed's popularity and legality. The name Alsatian remained for five decades, until 1977, when successful campaigns by dog enthusiasts pressured the British kennel clubs to allow the breed to be registered again as German Shepherds. The word "Alsatian" continued to appear in parentheses as part of the formal breed name of the British Kennel Club, until removed in 2010.

=== Kennel club classification ===
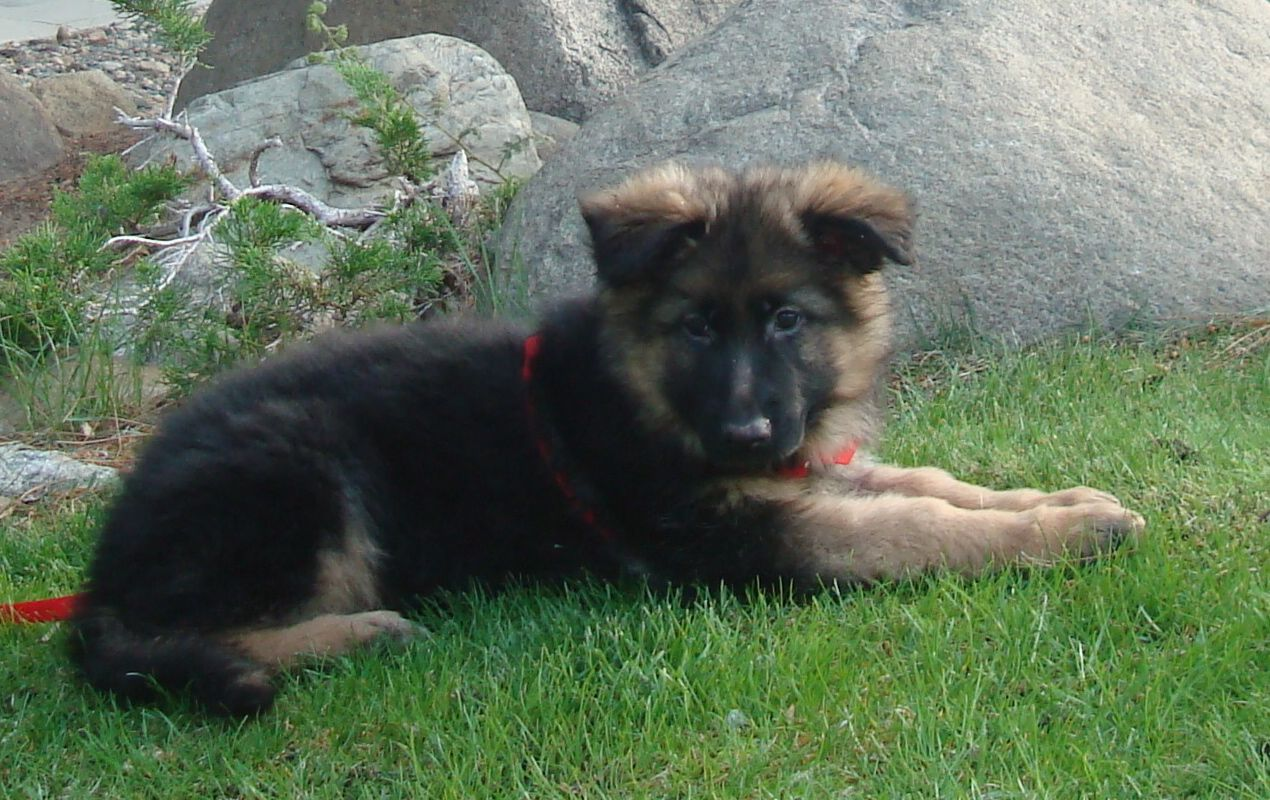
A nine-week-old puppy

When the UK Kennel accepted registrations in 1919, 54 German Shepherds were registered. By 1926 this number had grown to over 8000. The breed gained international recognition after the end of World War I. Returning soldiers spoke highly of the breed and animal actors Rin Tin Tin and Strongheart popularised the breed further. The first German Shepherd Dog registered in the United States was Queen of Switzerland. Her offspring had defects as the result of poor breeding, which caused the breed to decline in popularity during the late 1920s.

Popularity increased again after Sieger Pfeffer von Bern became the 1937 and 1938 Grand Victor in American Kennel Club dog shows, only to have another decline at the conclusion of World War II, due to anti-German sentiment. Popularity increased gradually until 1993, when they became the third most popular breed in the United States. As of 2016, the German Shepherd is the second most popular breed in the US. It is typically among the most frequently registered breeds in other countries. It was the third-most registered breed by the American Kennel Club in 2020, and seventh-most registered breed by The Kennel Club in the United Kingdom in 2016.

== Description ==
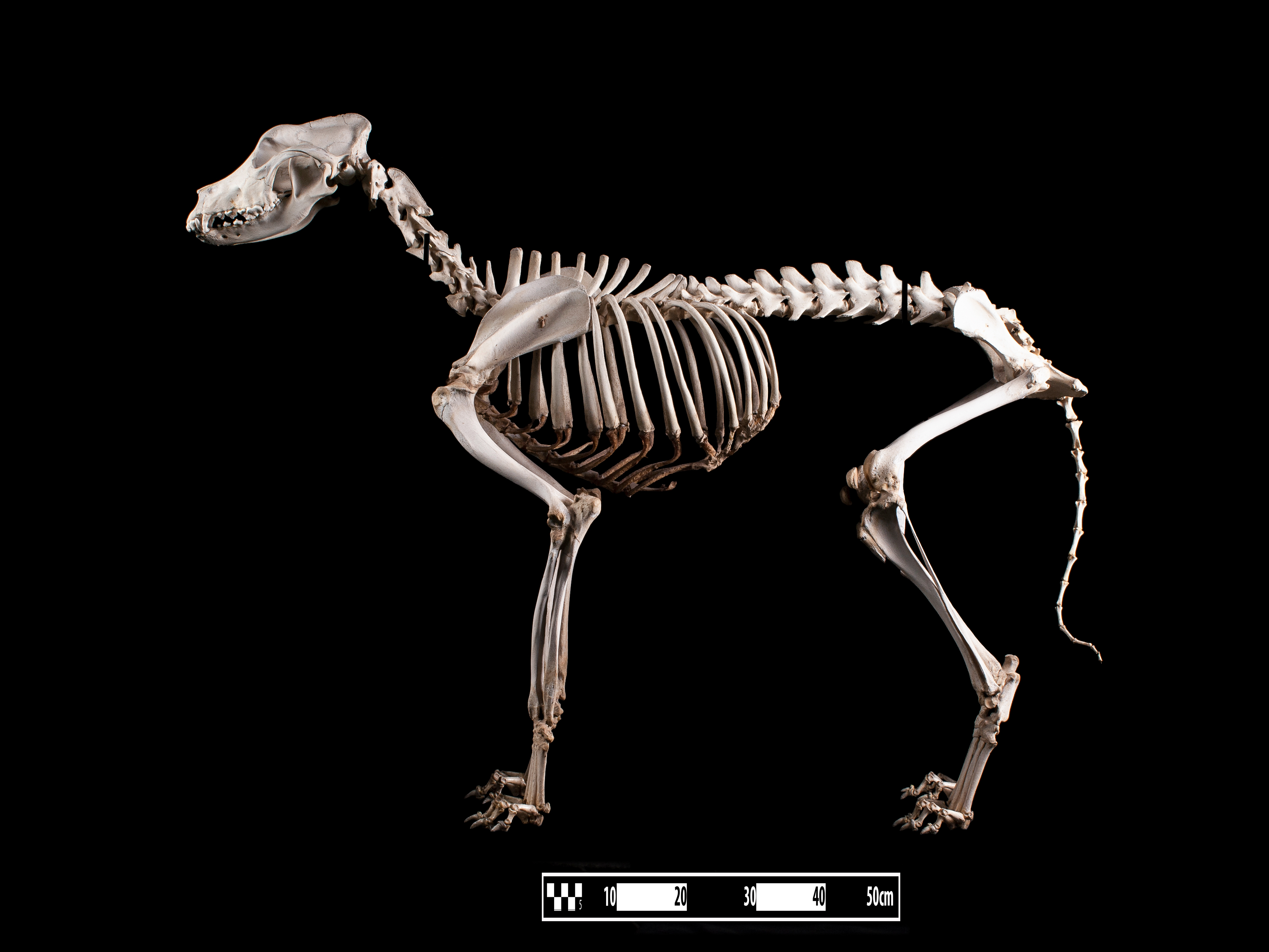
Skeleton in the Museum of Veterinary Anatomy of São Paulo, Brazil

German Shepherds are medium to large-sized dogs. The breed standard height at the withers is 60–65 cm (24–26 in) for males, and 55–60 cm (22–24 in) for females. German Shepherds can sprint at speeds of up to 30 miles per hour (48 km/h). German Shepherds are longer than they are tall, with an ideal proportion of 10 to 8 1/2. The AKC official breed standard does not set a standard weight range. They have a domed forehead, a long square-cut muzzle with strong jaws and a black nose. The eyes are medium-sized and brown. The ears are large and stand erect, open at the front and parallel, but they often are pulled back during movement. A German Shepherd has a long neck, which is raised when excited and lowered when moving at a fast pace as well as stalking. The tail is bushy and reaches to the hock.

German Shepherds have a double coat which is close and dense with a thick undercoat. The coat is accepted in two variants: medium and long. The gene for long hair is recessive, and therefore the long-haired variety is rarer. Treatment of the long-haired variation differs across standards; it is accepted but does not compete against standard-coated dogs under the German and UK Kennel Clubs while it can compete with standard-coated dogs, but is considered a fault in the American Kennel Club. The FCI accepted the long-haired type in 2010, listing it as the variety b, while the short-haired type is listed as the variety a.

Most commonly, German Shepherds are either black and tan or black and red. Most colour varieties have black masks and black body markings which can range from a classic "saddle" to an overall "blanket." Rarer colour variations include sable, solid black, white, liver, silver, blue, and panda varieties. The all-black and sable varieties are acceptable according to most standards; however, the blue and liver are considered to be serious faults and the all-white is grounds for instant disqualification from showing in conformation at All Breed and Specialty Shows.

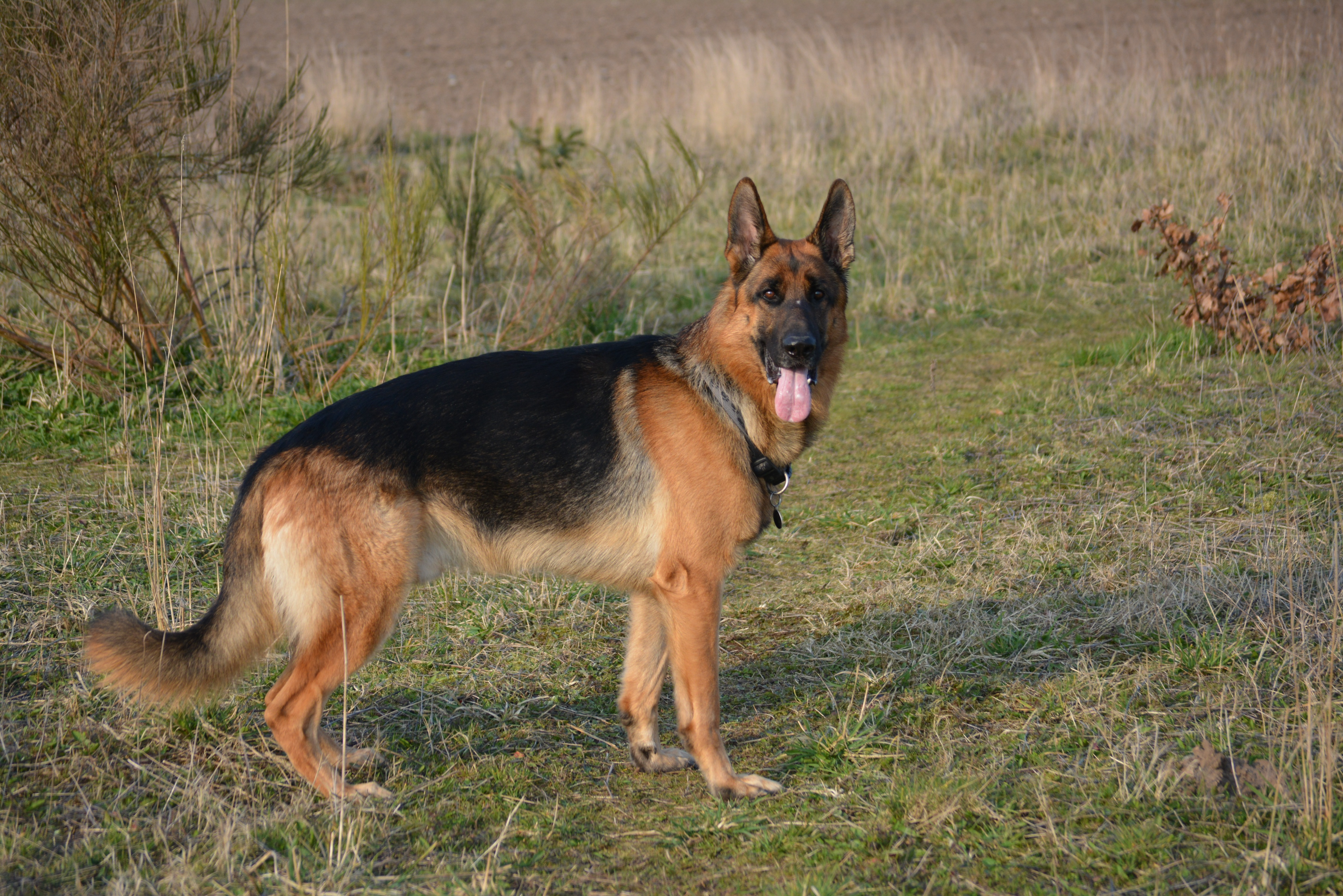
Saddle black-and-tan coat

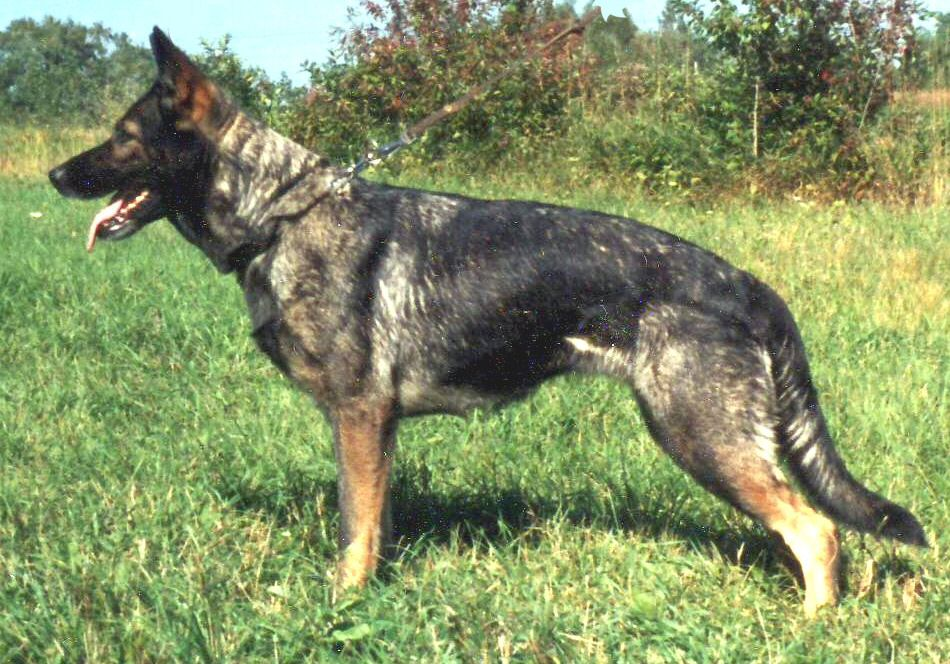
Black mask and sable

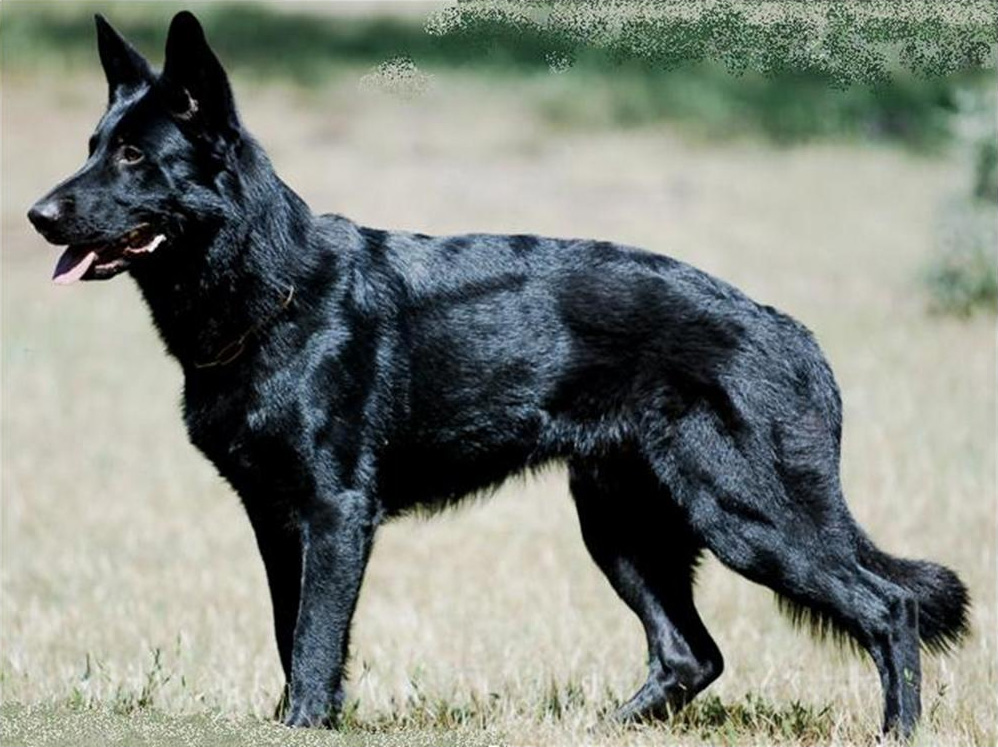
Solid black

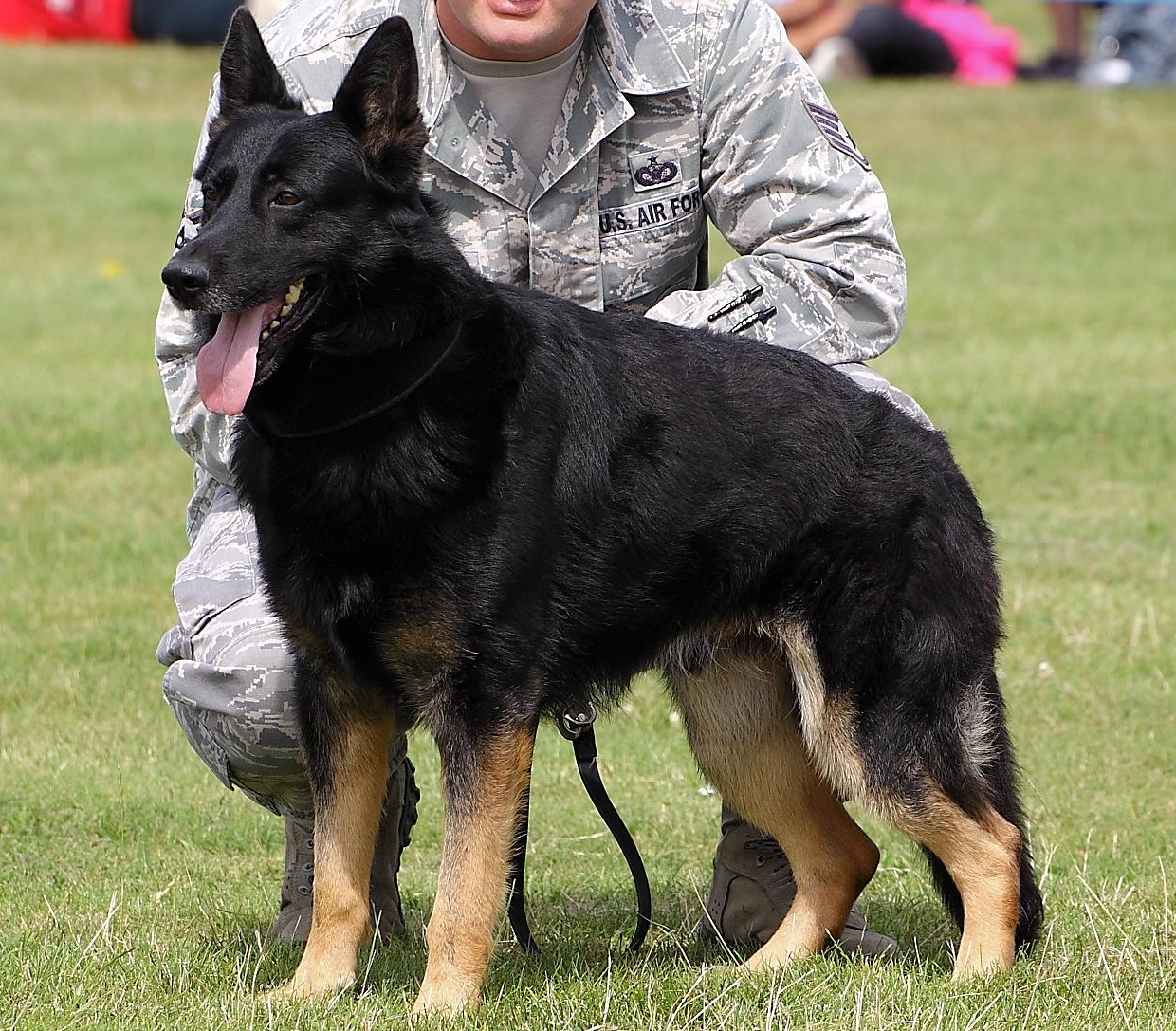
Bi-colour

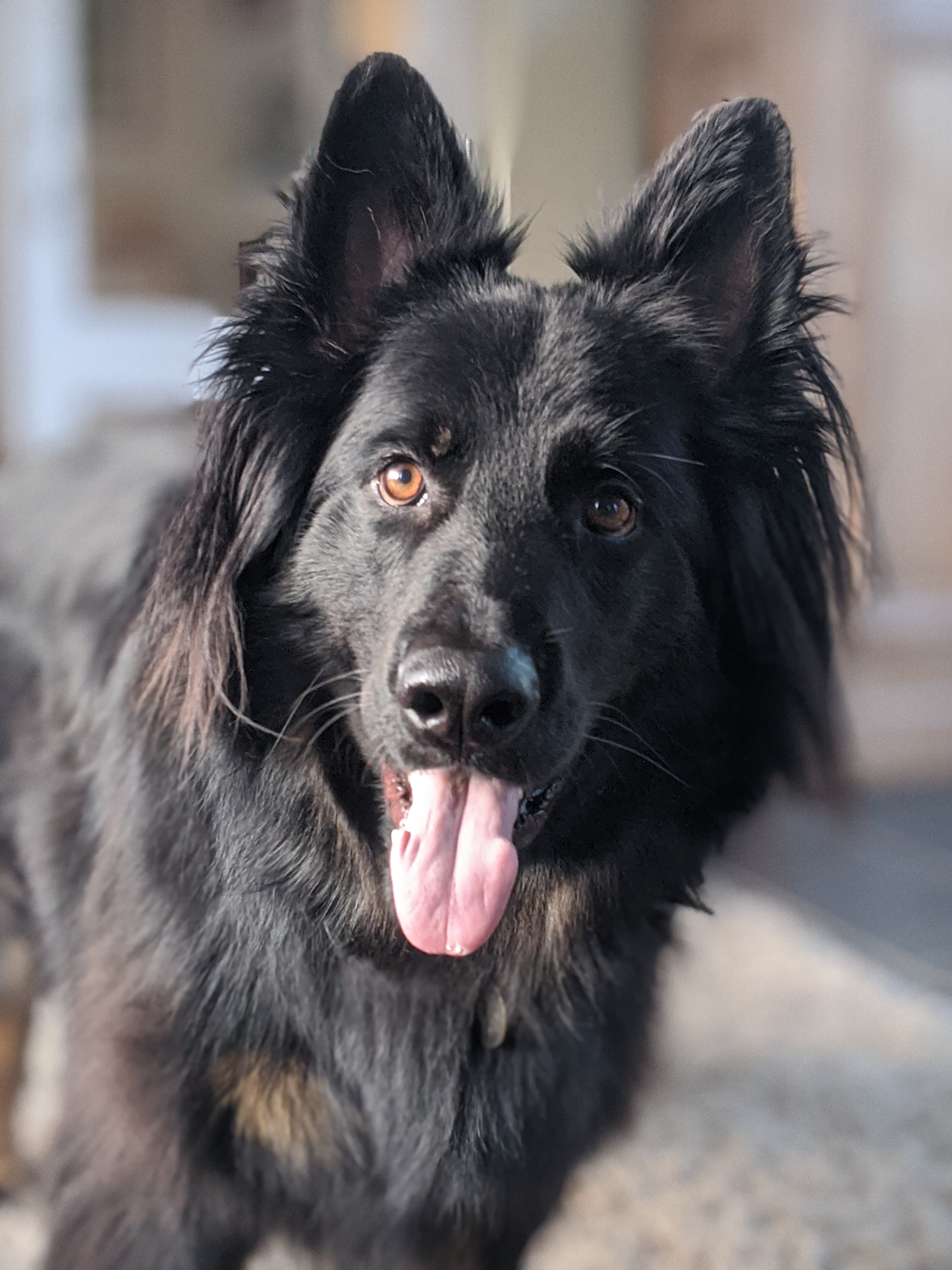
Long-haired black-and-tan

=== Variants ===
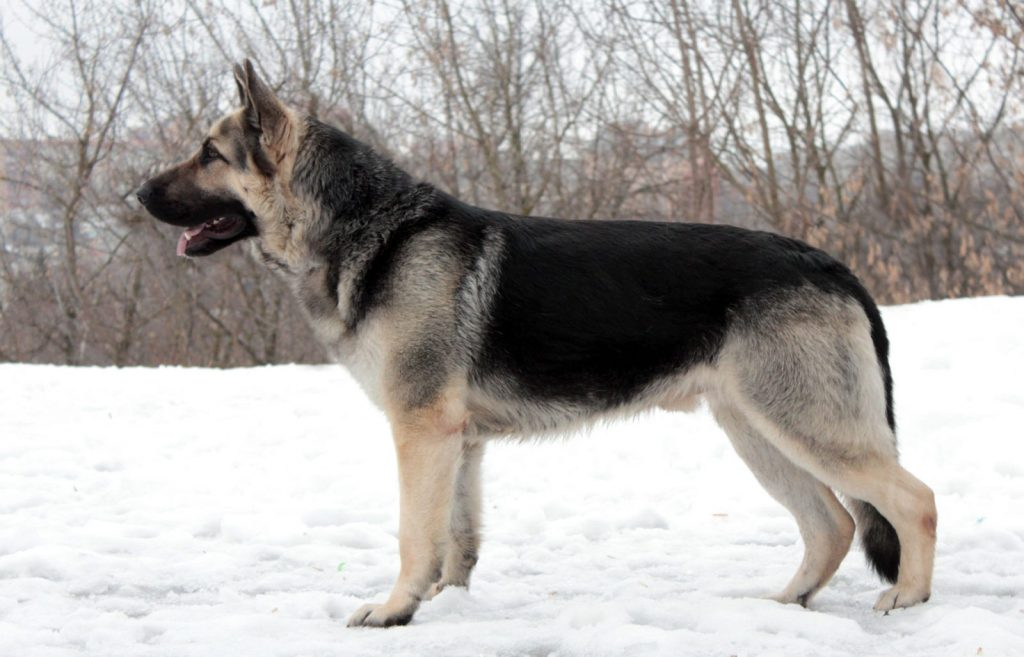
East-European Shepherd

- The East European Shepherd is a variety of the German Shepherd bred in the former Soviet Union. It was developed to create a larger, more cold-resistant breed. It is more moderate in structure, and has become one of Russia's most popular dog types.
- The King Shepherd is a variety of the German Shepherd bred in the United States. It was developed in hopes to rectify the physical deformities that have been bred into the original breed.

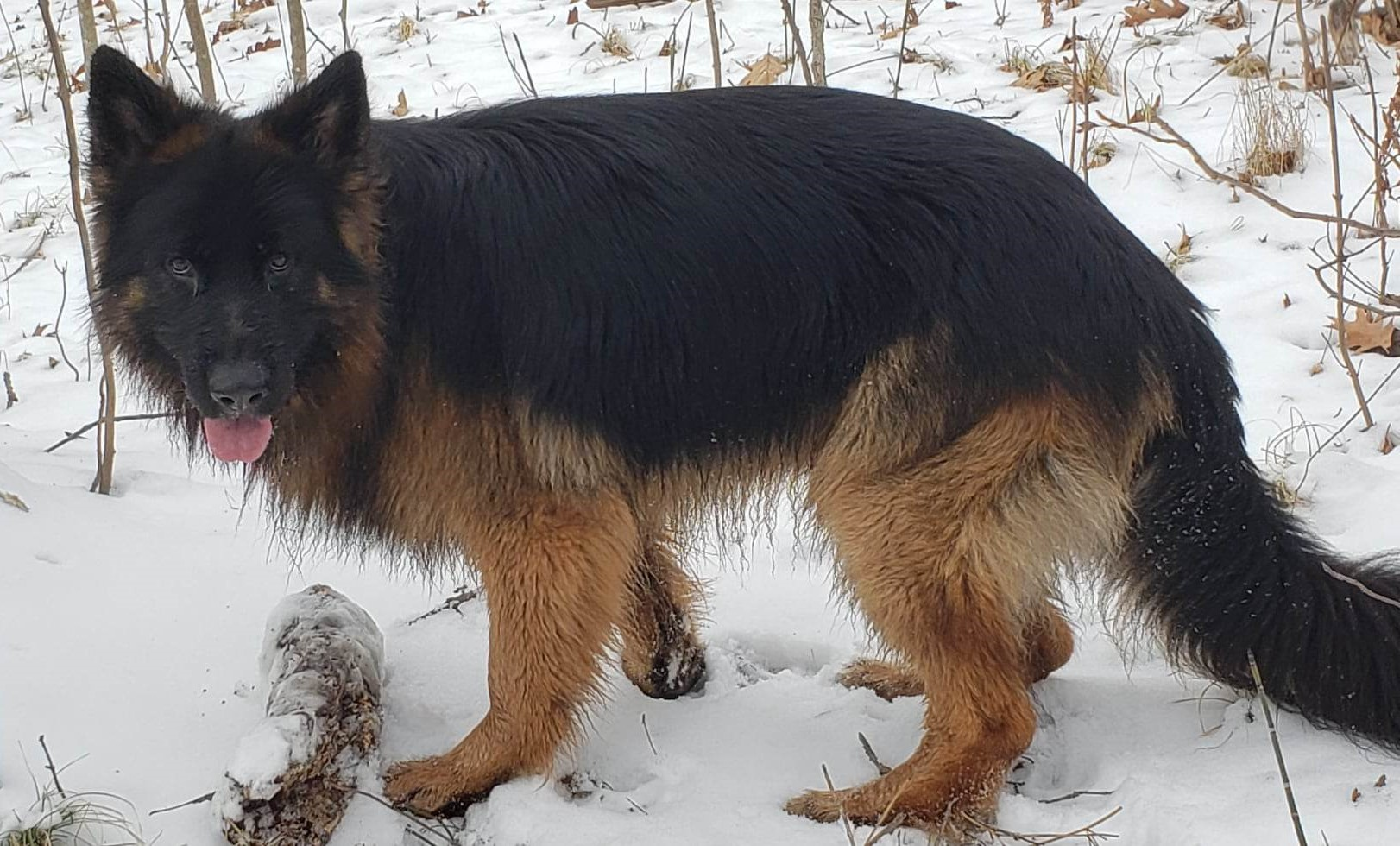
Shiloh Shepherd

- The Shiloh Shepherd is a variety of the German Shepherd bred in the United States. It was developed in the 1970s and 1980s in response to concerns about behavioral and conformational traits observed in modern German Shepherds, and was bred for its large size, length of back, temperament, and hip structure. It has been recognised since 1990 by the American Rare Breed Association.

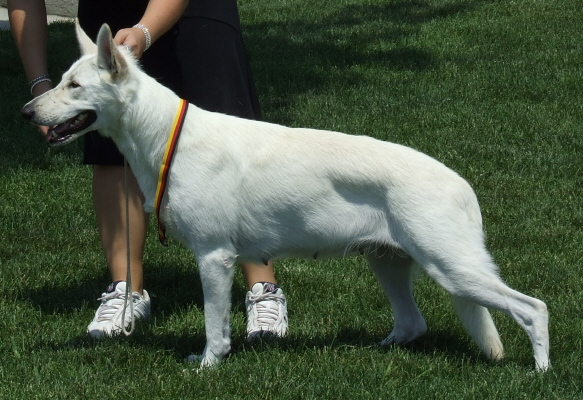
White Shepherd

- The White Shepherd is a variety of the German Shepherd bred in the United States. White-coated German Shepherds were once banned from registration in their native Germany, but in the United States and Canada the coloration gained a following and a breed club was formed specifically for white German Shepherds, calling their variety the White Shepherd. The variety is recognised as a separate breed by the United Kennel Club.

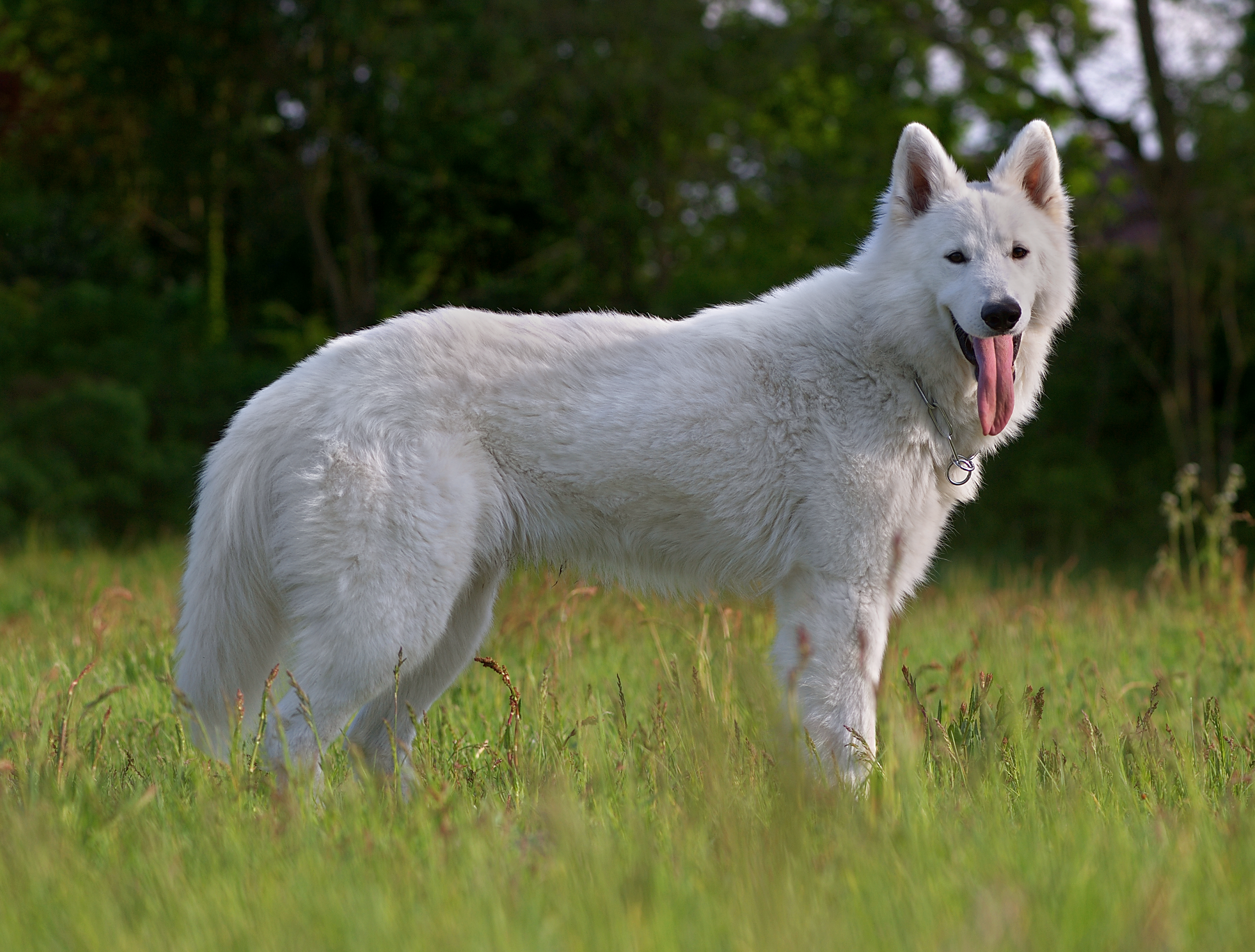
White Swiss Shepherd Dog

- The White Swiss Shepherd Dog (French: Berger Blanc Suisse, German: Weisser Schweizer Schäferhund, Italian: Pastore Svizzero Bianco) is a variety of the German Shepherd bred in Switzerland. It descends from the American White Shepherds; the first stud dog of what was to become the breed was an American dog born in 1966 and imported to Switzerland. The variety was recognised by the Fédération Cynologique Internationale as a separate breed in 2003, and it is now recognised by a number of national kennel clubs.

=== Behavior ===
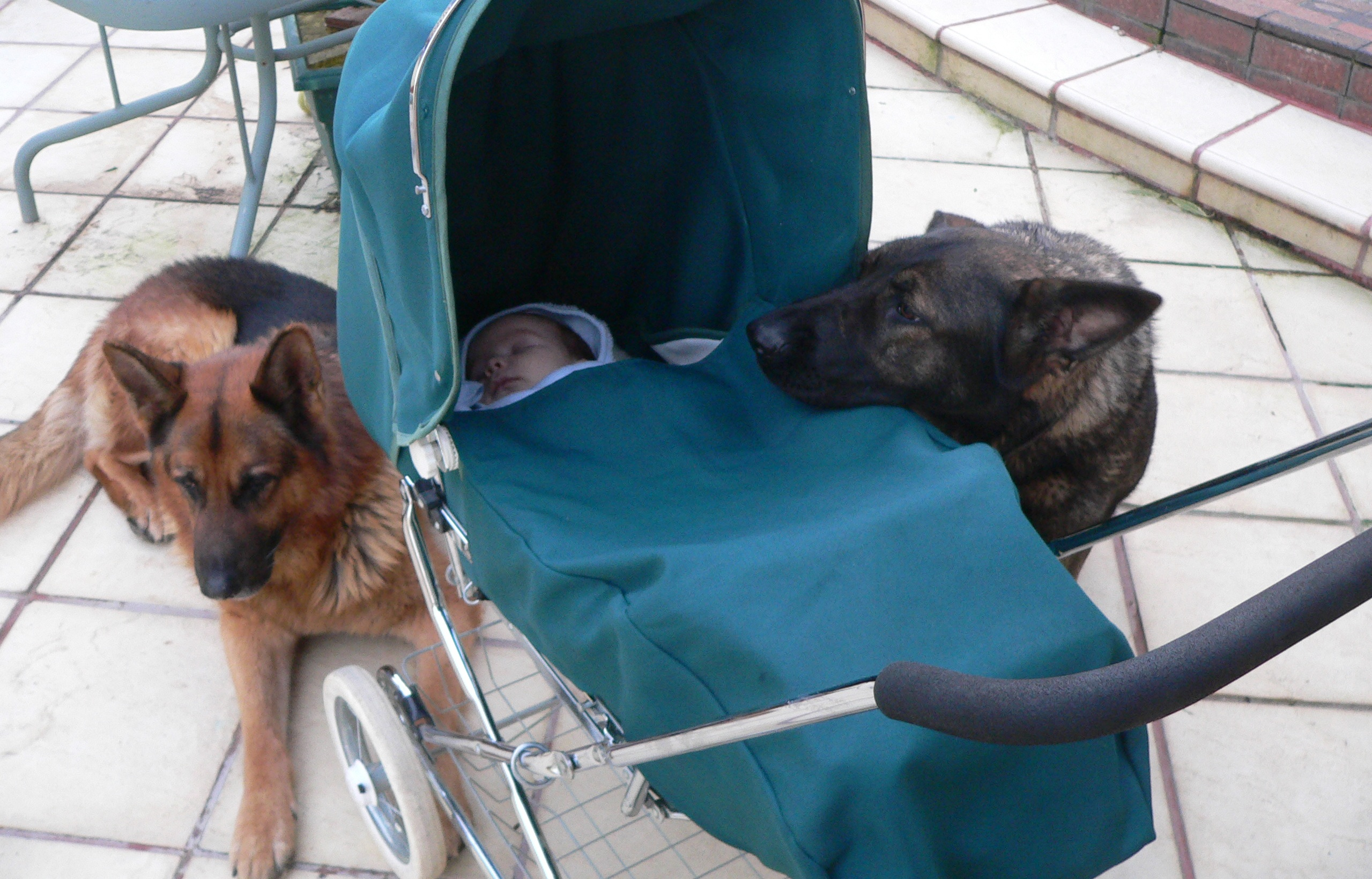
A human infant with two dogs

German Shepherds are moderately active dogs and are described in breed standards as self assured. The breed is marked by a willingness to learn and an eagerness to have a purpose. The breed standard describes them as curious, a trait desirable in roles like guard dogs and search missions. They can become overprotective of their family and territory, especially if not socialised correctly. They are not inclined to become immediate friends with strangers. German Shepherds are highly intelligent and obedient, as well as protective of their owners.

==== Intelligence ====
German Shepherds were bred specifically for their intelligence. In a list of breeds most likely to bark as watchdogs, Stanley Coren ranked the breed in second place. Coupled with their strength, this trait makes the breed desirable as police, guard and search and rescue dogs, as they are able to quickly learn various tasks and interpret instructions better than other breeds.

==== Bite and jaw force ====
A 2020 literature review in Plastic and Reconstructive Surgery found that from 1971 to 2018, of all pure breed dogs in the United States, the German Shepherd was responsible for the most bites severe enough to require hospital treatment.

An Australian report from 1999 provides statistics showing that German Shepherds are the breed third most likely to attack a person in some Australian locales. After the reporters evaluated the breed’s popularity, they reduced the percentage of attacks by German Shepherds to 38th place.

According to the National Geographic Channel television show Dangerous Encounters, the bite of a German Shepherd has a force of over 1,060 newtons (238 lbf) (compared with that of a Rottweiler, over 1,180–1,460 newtons (265–328 lbf), a Pit bull, 1,050 newtons (235 lbf), a Labrador Retriever, of approximately 1,000 newtons (230 lbf), or a human, of approximately 380 newtons (86 lbf)).

== Health ==
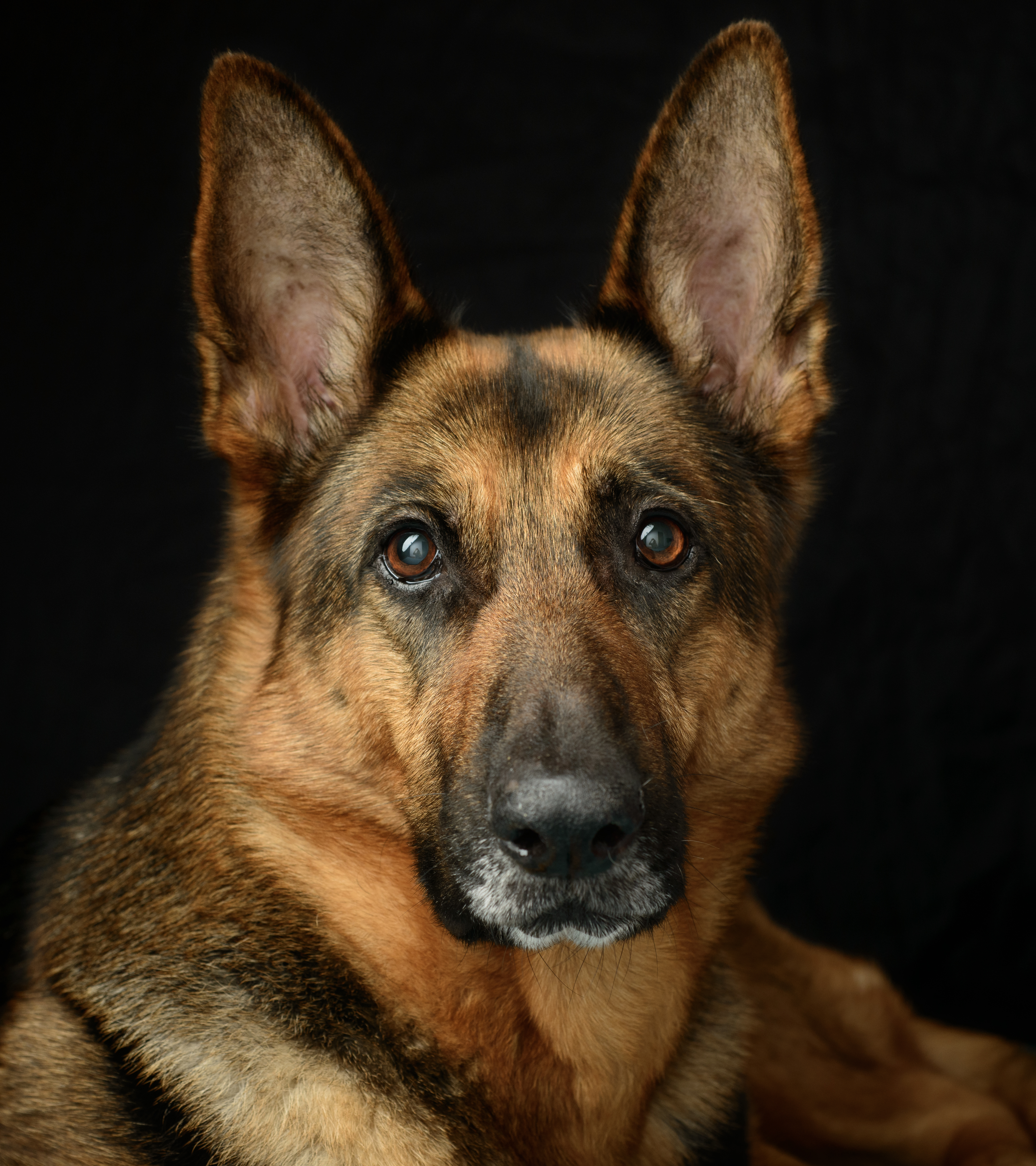
Portrait of a ten year old German Shepherd

Many common ailments of the German Shepherd are a result of the inbreeding practised early in the breed's life. One such common ailment is hip and elbow dysplasia which may cause the dog to experience pain later on in life and may cause arthritis. A study conducted by the University of Zurich found that 45% of the police working dogs were affected by degenerative spinal stenosis, although a small sample size was used. The Orthopedic Foundation for Animals found that 19.1% of German Shepherds are affected by hip dysplasia.

The German Shepherd Dog is one of the breeds more commonly affected by degenerative myelopathy, which is caused by a mutation in the SOD1 gene. A small study in the UK showed 16% of young asymptomatic German Shepherds to be homozygous for the mutation, with a further 38% being carriers.

German Shepherds are among the breeds regularly tested for Von Willebrand disease, an inherited bleeding disorder, and are at risk of exocrine pancreatic insufficiency (EPI), a degenerative disease of the pancreas. It is estimated that 1% of the UK population of German Shepherds has this disease.

German Shepherds are among the breeds with the highest risk of hemangiosarcoma, an aggressive cancer of the lining of blood vessels: a 2025 VetCompass study found the breed had 6.35 times the odds of diagnosis compared with crossbreeds (95% CI 4.86-8.29).

=== Lifespan ===
Overall lifespan is approximately 10 years. Several studies have found the average lifespan to be lower than the average for all dogs: a 2024 UK study found a mean lifespan of 11.3 years, compared to 12 years for crossbreeds and 12.7 years for purebreds; a 2022 UK study using veterinary records found a value of 10.16 years compared to 11.23 overall and 11.82 for crossbreeds; in Italy a 2024 study found an average of 10 years, the same as the overall average; a 2005 study in Sweden based on insurance data found 51% of German Shepherd dogs died by the age of 10, higher than the overall rate of 35%. A 2015 French study found a mean lifespan of 10.08 years.

=== Musculoskeletal ===
Musculoskeletal disorders are debilitating conditions that are often associated with genetic makeup, malnutrition, and stress-related events. Some breeds like the German Shepherd, are predisposed to a variety of different skeletal disorders, including but not limited to: canine hip dysplasia, Cauda equina syndrome, and osteoarthritis.

Canine hip dysplasia (CHD) is the abnormal formation of the hip joint and surrounding tissue causing instability and partial dislocation of the hip joint, resulting in pain, inflammation, lameness, and potentially osteoarthritis of the joint. A North American study analysing more than 1,000,000 hip and 250,000 elbow scans in dogs over the age of two found the German Shepherd Dog to have a rate of hip and elbow dysplasia to be 18.9% and 17.8% respectively. The German Shepherd had the 8th highest rate of hip dysplasia and 6th highest rate of elbow dysplasia. Another North American study found 10.26% of German Shepherd Dogs surveyed at teaching hospitals to have hip dysplasia, compared to 3.52% overall.

=== Pituitary dwarfism ===
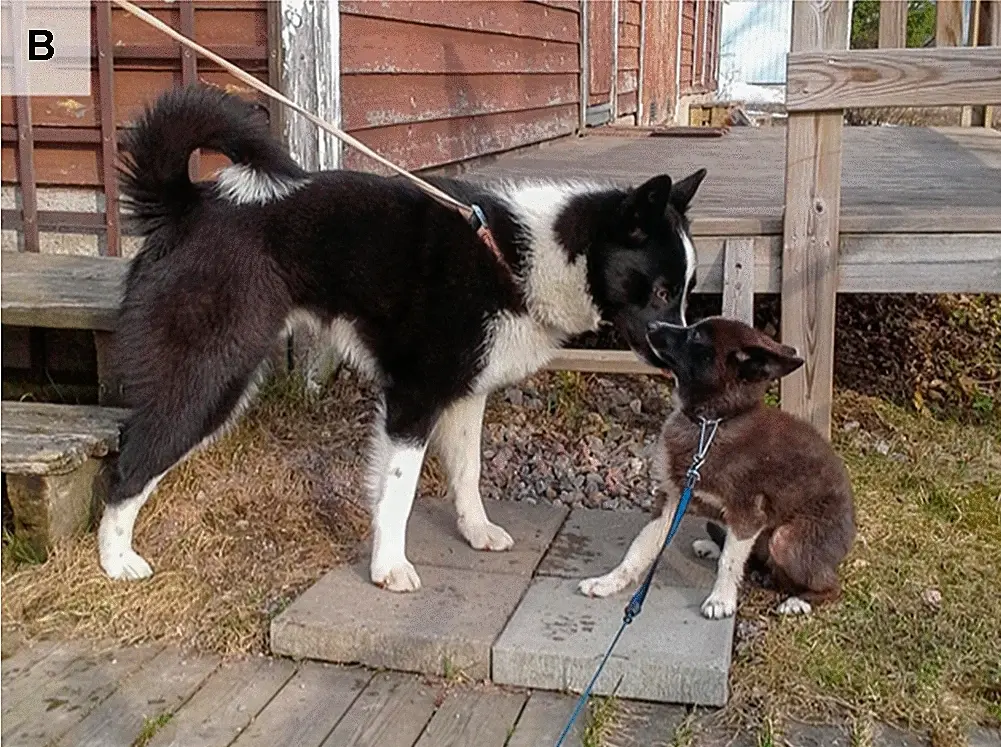
Two Karelian Bear Dogs at 10 months of age, left is an unaffected littermate and on the right is a bitch affected by pituitary dwarfism

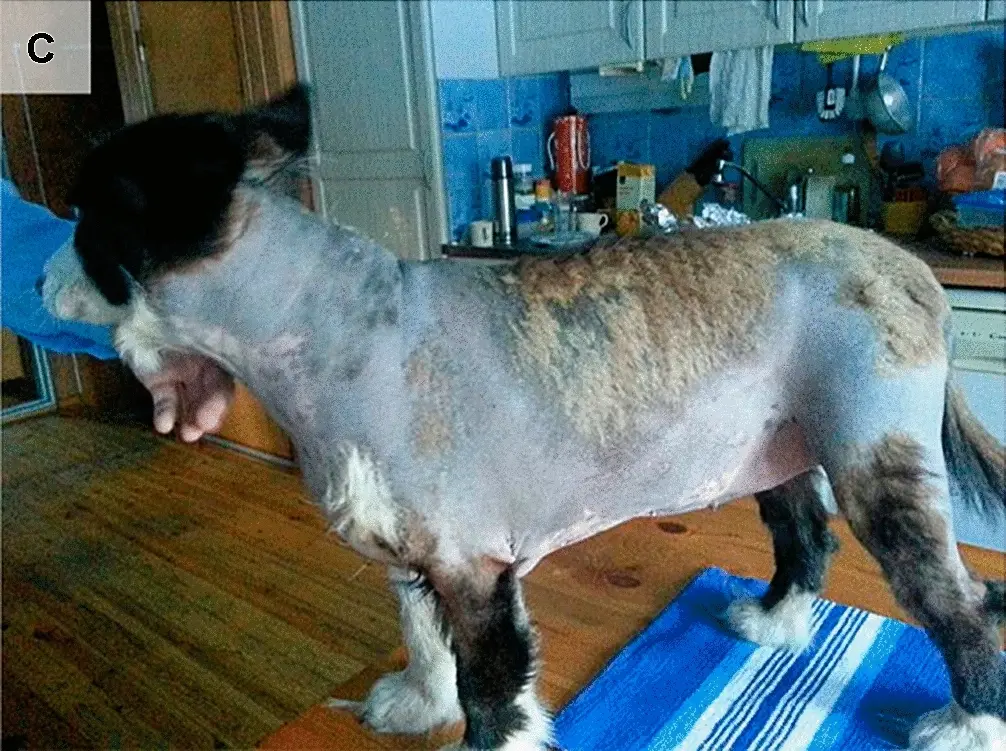
An adult Karelian Bear Dog bitch with pituitary dwarfism displaying severe alopecia

Congenital hyposomatotropism, also known as pituitary dwarfism has been known to be an autosomal recessive disorder in the German Shepherd dog for a long time. The condition causes growth retardation. The puppy coat is retained into adulthood and guard hairs fail to fully develop outside of the distal extremities. Eventually, full alopecia occurs. The degree of growth retardation and other clinical symptoms varies between affected dogs.

Investigations into the genealogy in 1978 found the mutation evolved in 1940 or earlier. Multiple champions have been shown to be carriers of the mutation, explaining the spread and prevalence of the disorder. This condition has been observed in breeds that were crossed with German Shepherd dogs such as the Karelian Bear dog, Saarloos Wolfhound, and the Czechoslovakian Wolfdog. Pituitary dwarfism in other dog breeds (excluding those with German Shepherd ancestry) is extremely rare.

Unlike humans where the POU1F1 and PROP1 genes are responsible for the defect a mutation in the LHX3 gene is responsible for the condition. The University of Utrecht offers a genetic test for this defect.

Untreated dogs usually live between 3-5 years. Dogs that undergo treatment can live healthily for several years but are still unlikely to have a normal life expectancy.

== Use ==
The German Shepherd is commonly kept as a companion dog, and according to the Fédération Cynologique Internationale is among the most frequently registered breeds world-wide.

It is much used as a working dog. They are known for being easy to train and good for performing tasks and following instructions. They are especially well known for their police work, being used for tracking criminals, patrolling troubled areas and detecting and holding suspects. Additionally, thousands of German Shepherds have been used by the military. These military working dogs (MWD) are usually trained for scout duty, and they are used to warn soldiers of the presence of enemies or of booby traps or other hazards. German Shepherds have also been trained by military groups to parachute from aircraft or as anti-tank weapons. They were used in World War II as messenger dogs, rescue dogs and personal guard dogs.

It is used in a wide variety of scent-work roles. These include search and rescue, cadaver searching, narcotics detection, explosives detection, accelerant detection and mine detection, among others. They are suited for these lines of work because of their keen sense of smell and their ability to work regardless of distractions. At one time the German Shepherd was the breed chosen almost exclusively to be used as a guide dog for the visually impaired. When formal guide dog training began in Switzerland in the 1920s under the leadership of Dorothy Eustis, all of the dogs trained were German Shepherd females. An experiment in temperament testing of a group of Labrador Retrievers and German Shepherds showed that the Retrievers scored higher on average in emotional stability, ability to recover promptly from frightening situations, cooperative behaviour and friendliness; while the German Shepherds were superior in aggression and defensive behaviour. These results suggested that Labrador Retrievers were more suited to guide dog work while German Shepherds were more suited to police work.

Currently, Labradors and Golden Retrievers are more widely used for this work, although there are still German Shepherds being trained. In 2013, about 15% of the dogs trained by Guide Dogs of America were German Shepherds, while the remainder were Labrador Retrievers and Golden Retrievers. The Guide Dogs for the Blind Association in the United Kingdom trains some German Shepherds, while the comparable organisation in the US only trains Labrador Retrievers, Golden Retrievers and crosses between these breeds.

German Shepherds are still used for herding and tending sheep grazing in meadows next to gardens and crop fields. They are expected to patrol the boundaries to keep sheep from trespassing and damaging the crops. In Germany and other places, these skills are tested in utility dog trials also known as Herdengebrauchshund (HGH) herding utility dog trials.

One Mexican German Shepherd, Zuyaqui, was dissected and his body put on display at the Sedena's "Narco Museum" in Mexico. He is regarded to be the dog who has captured the most drugs in Mexican police and military history.

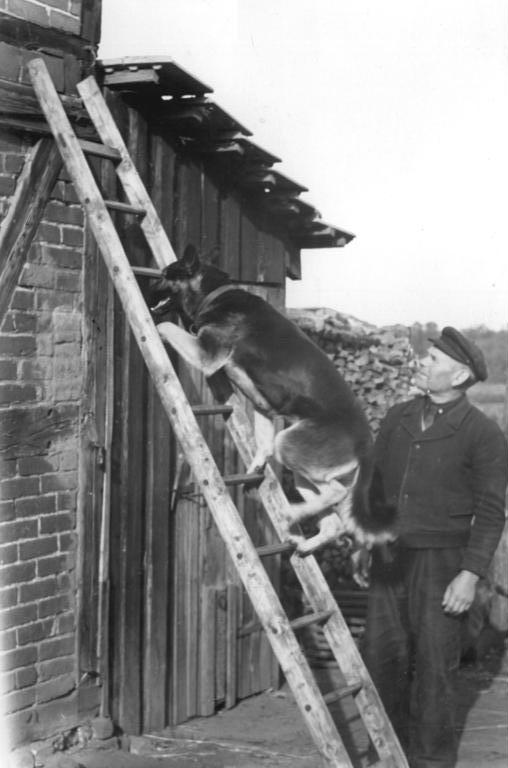
German night-watchman with dog, 1950

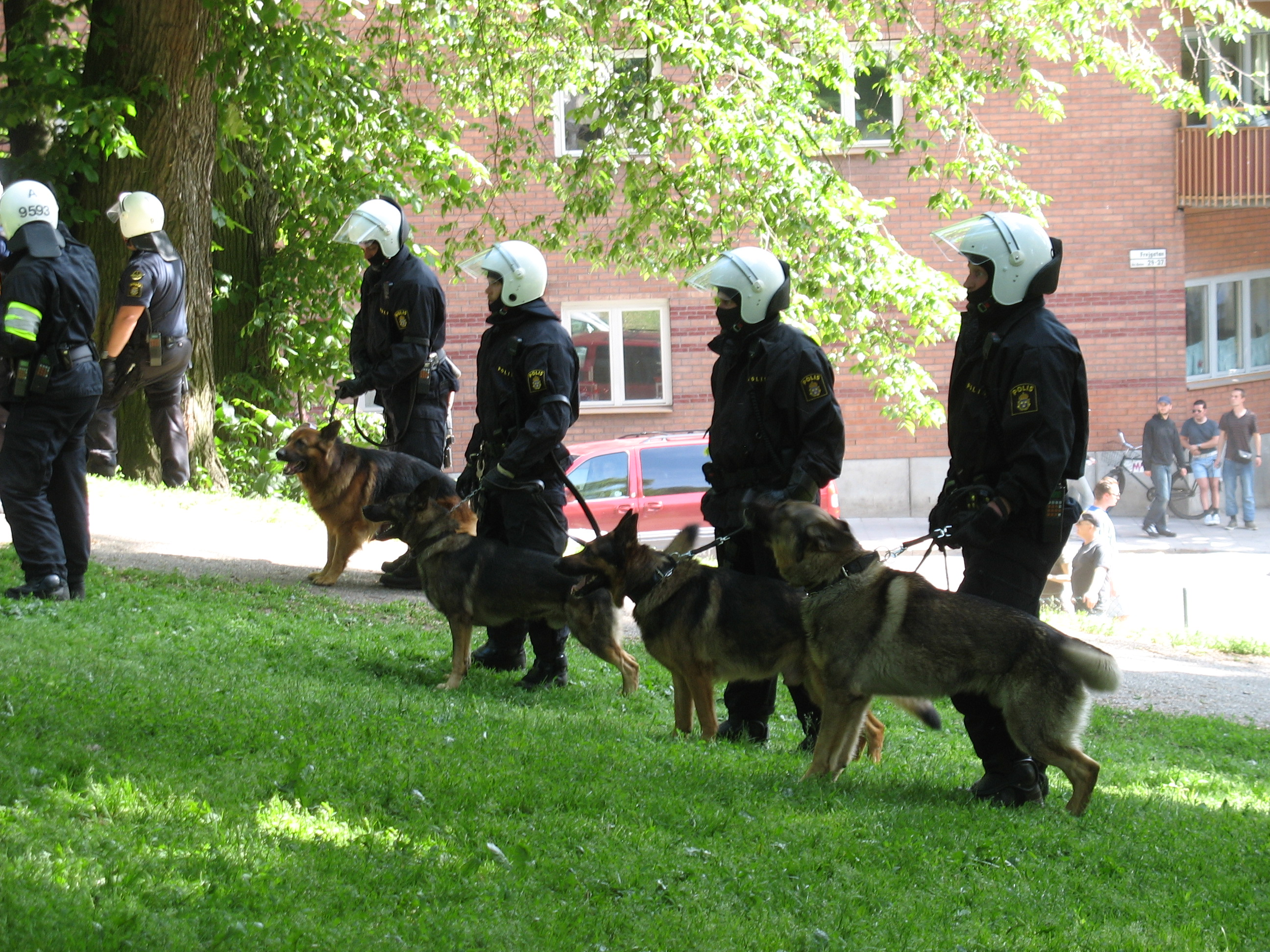
Swedish police dogs, 2007

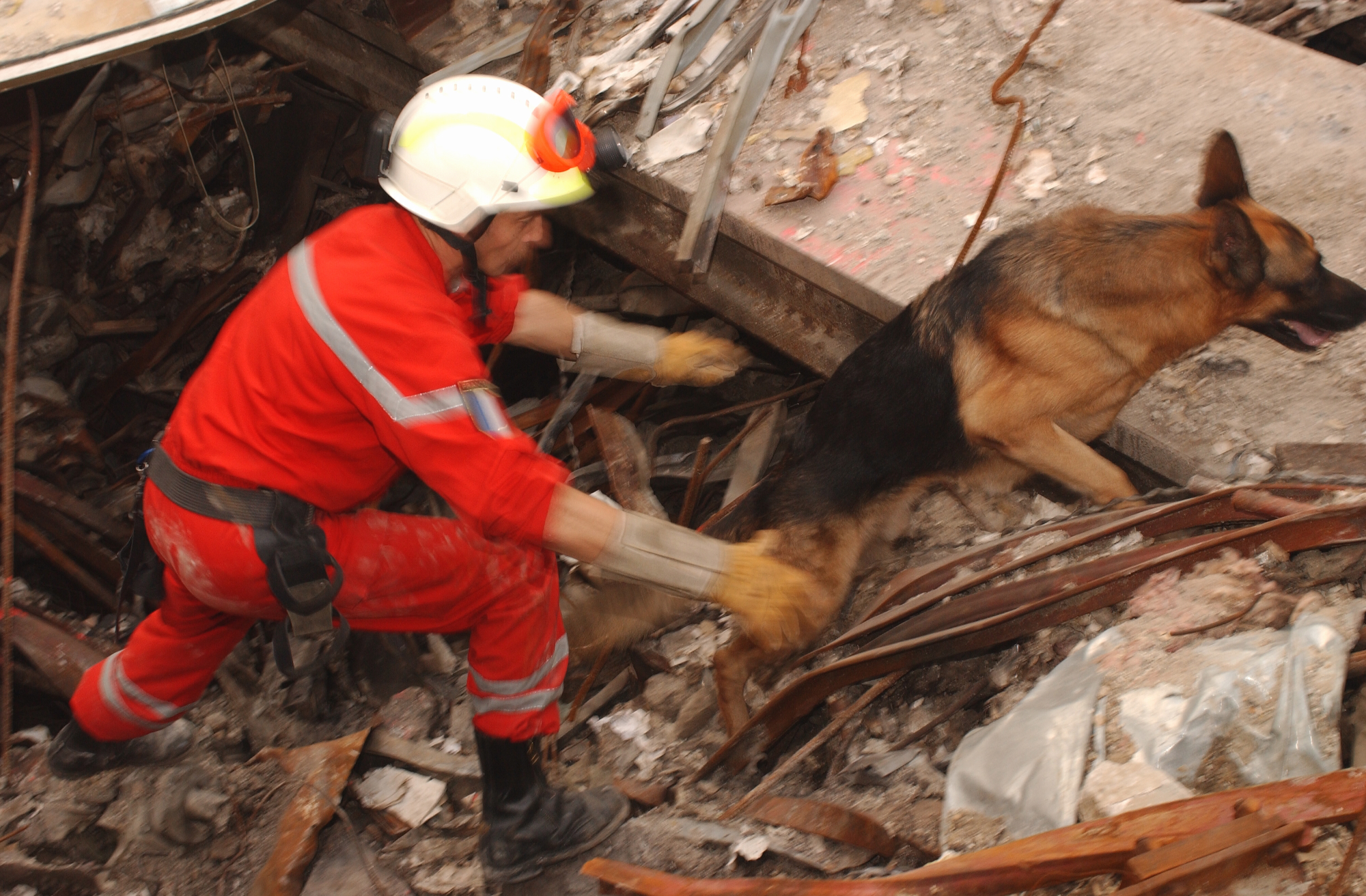
Rescue dog at the site of the collapsed World Trade Center, 2001

Military dog during training

== Controversies ==
A common breed club's goal for German Shepherd body conformity, criticised by the UK Kennel Club

The modern German Shepherd breed is criticised by experts for straying away from Max von Stephanitz's original ideology that German Shepherds should be bred primarily as working dogs and that breeding should be strictly controlled to eliminate defects quickly. He believed that, above all else, German Shepherds should be bred for intelligence and working ability.

The Kennel Club, in the United Kingdom, is involved in a dispute with German Shepherd breed clubs about the issue of soundness in the show strain of the breed. Some show strains have been bred with an extremely roached topline (when the topline is higher than withers) that causes poor gait in the hind legs.

The issue was raised in the BBC documentary, Pedigree Dogs Exposed, which said that critics of the breed describe it as "half dog, half frog." An orthopaedic vet remarked on footage of dogs in a show ring that they were "not normal."

The Kennel Club's position is that "this issue of soundness is not a simple difference of opinion, it is the fundamental issue of the breed's essential conformation and movement." The Kennel Club has decided to retrain judges to penalise dogs with these conditions.

The Kennel Club also recommends testing for haemophilia and hip dysplasia, other common problems with the breed.

== In popular culture ==
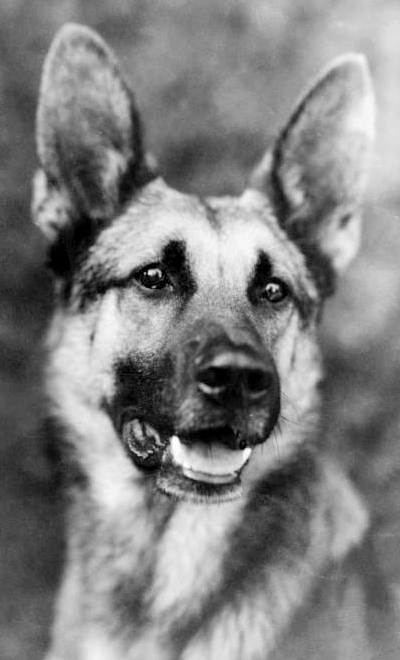
Strongheart, one of the earliest canine stars (1921)

German Shepherds have been featured in a wide range of media. In 1921 Strongheart became one of the earliest canine film stars, and was followed in 1922 by Rin Tin Tin. Both have stars on the Hollywood Walk of Fame.

Batman's dog Ace the Bat-Hound appeared in the Batman comic books, initially in 1955, through 1964. From 1964 onwards, his appearances have been sporadic.

A German Shepherd named Inspector Rex is the star of an Austrian police procedural drama program of the same name, which won many awards, where German Shepherd Rex assists the Vienna Kriminalpolizei homicide unit.

Kántor was a famous and very successful police dog in Hungary in the 1950s and early 1960s. After his death his story was fictionalised by two crime novels by Rudolf Szamos, titled Kántor Investigates and Kántor in the Big City. A five-part thriller series for television titled Kántor was produced in 1975, which was loosely based on the actual dog's story, setting the events more than a decade after the real Kántor died. It became one of the staple productions of Hungarian television history, making German Shepherds the most popular dog breed in the country ever since. The taxidermy mount of Kántor's body is on display at the Police Museum in Budapest.
