= Max von Stephanitz =

German soldier and dog breeder (1864–1936)

Captain Max von Stephanitz
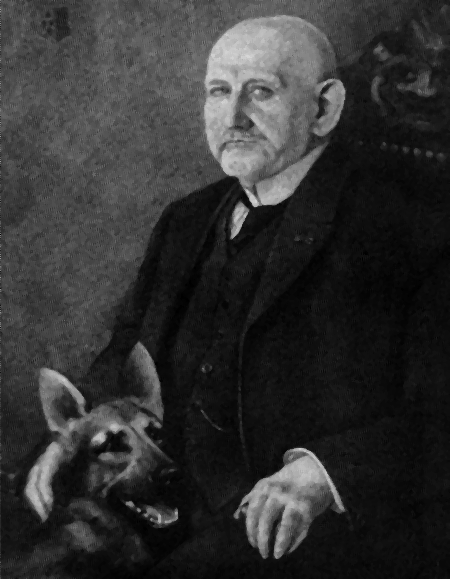
- Max von Stephanitz and Horand von Grafrath, c. 1900
- Born: Max Emil Friedrich von Stephanitz; December 30, 1864; Dresden, Kingdom of Saxony
- Died: April 22, 1936 (aged 71) Dresden, Gau Saxony, Nazi Germany
- Allegiance: German Empire
- Branch: Cavalry
- Rank: Captain
- Other work: Developed German Shepherd dog breed

Max Emil Friedrich von Stephanitz (30 December 1864 – 22 April 1936) was a German cavalry officer and dog breeder. He is credited with having developed the German Shepherd dog breed as it is currently known, set guidelines for the breed standard, and was the first president of the Verein für Deutsche Schäferhunde (S.V.).

== Early years ==
Max Emil Friedrich von Stephanitz was born on 30 December 1864 as the son of Friedrich Wilhelm von Stephanitz and Maria Münch in Dresden, Kingdom of Saxony, into German nobility. His father died when he was just a child. Stephanitz attended Vitzthum-Gymnasium where he learned to speak French. Having an interest in agriculture he wanted to become a farmer, but it was his mothers wish that he become an officer in the military.

Stephanitz was a career cavalry officer and spent some time serving at the Veterinary College in Berlin. Here he gained valuable knowledge about biology, anatomy, and the science of movement all of which he later applied to the breeding of dogs. He was promoted to Captain in 1898 and shortly after took his release.

Around the same time he married his first wife with whom he had two children. Stephanitz also purchased an estate; Jahrholzwieshof in Grafrath.

== The beginnings of standardisation ==
Stephanitz purchased property near Grafrath in the 1890s where he began experimenting with dog breeding. He used many of the techniques utilised by English dog breeders of the period. He was primarily interested in improving the German shepherding dogs because they were local and were the working dogs of his time. Stephanitz enjoyed attending dog shows and observed that there were many different types of shepherding dogs in use in Germany but there was no breed standardisation. He greatly admired those dogs with a wolf-like appearance and prick ears who also were intelligent, had sharp senses and willingness to work and believed that he could create a better working dog that could then be used throughout Germany.

He purchased his first dog Hektor Linksrhein in 1899 and changed his name to Horand von Grafrath. Horand was used as the primary breeding stud by Stephanitz and other breeders and is the foundation of the German Shepherd breed. Stephanitz used the knowledge he had acquired during his years at the Veterinary College and "...established a ‘grand design’ he wanted breeders to aim for with judging based on angle of bones, proportions and overall measurements." Horand's son Hektor v. Schwaben and his grandsons Heinz v. Starkenburg, Beowolf and Pilot were also instrumental in standardizing the breed. Dogs from other areas of Germany such as Franconia, Württemberg and Thuringia were also used as breeders.

On 22 April 1899, Stephanitz founded the Verein für Deutsche Schäferhunde (S.V.) with his friend Artur Meyer. Three sheep masters, two factory owners, one architect, one mayor, one innkeeper, and one magistrate joined them as co-founders. Along with establishing a breed standard, the S.V. also developed a Zuchtbuch (Breed Register). Twenty years later they published the Körbuch (Breed Survey Book), which determines a dog's suitability for breeding based on its physical and mental characteristics, and not based solely on show wins. Under Stephanitz's guidance, the S.V. became the single largest breed club in the world, and it was his idea to introduce the breed to other types of work such as delivering messages, rescue work, sentry duties, and as personal guard dogs. The German Shepherd made its world debut in these roles during the First World War.

The first Schutzhund trial was held in Germany in 1901 and tested the dogs' abilities in tracking, obedience, and protection. The English Kennel Club honoured the breed with its own register in 1919.

Stephanitz died in Dresden on the 37th anniversary of the club he and Artur Meyer founded together. The S.V. is still in existence and is headquartered in Augsburg, Germany.
