= Verein für Deutsche Schäferhunde =

Breed club for German Shepherd dogs

German Shepherd Association
- Verein für Deutsche Schäferhunde
- Abbreviation: SV
- Formation: April 22, 1899; 127 years ago
- Founders: Max von Stephanitz, Arthur Meyer
- Headquarters: Augsburg
- Region served: Germany
- Official language: German
- Vorsitzender (President): Mr Wolfgang Henke
- Affiliations: FCI, VDH, WUSV
- Website: The Association for the German Shepherd Dog breed

The Verein für deutsche Schäferhunde (SV), in English, German Shepherd Association, is a breed club founded in Germany in 1899 by Max von Stephanitz and his colleague, Arthur Meyer, which set forward the standards of the German Shepherd dog breed.

== History ==
On the sidelines of a dog show in Karlsruhe in April 1899, Max von Stephanitz, Arthur Meyer, and a number of others decided to form a club for the German Shepherd Dog. On 22 April 1899, the Verein für deutsche Schäferhunde was formally established with its first headquarters in Stuttgart. Von Stephanitz was the Society's first President, and his dog, Hektor Linksrhein (known as Horand von Grafrath) was the first dog entered in the organization's breed registry, the Zuchtbuch für deutsche Schäferhunde (SZ).

Von Stephanitz strongly believed that the German Shepherd Dogs' working ability was of the utmost importance and that aesthetics were less important. Thus, in order to avoid the arguments that led to the disestablishment of an earlier club, the Phylax Society, the SV's first breed standard stipulated, "A pleasing appearance is desirable, but it cannot put the dog's working ability into question."

== Presidents of the SV ==
The current and former presidents of the SV are:

- 1899-1935: Captain Max von Stephanitz
- 1935-1945: Dr Kurt Roesebeck
- 1945-1956: Mr Caspar Katzmair
- 1956-1971: Dr Werner Funk
- 1971-1982: Dr Christoph Rummel
- 1982-1994: Mr Hermann Martin
- 1994–2002: Mr Peter Meßler
- 2002–2015: Wolfgang Henke
- 2015- : Heinrich Meßler
