= Coywolf =

Hybrid mammal

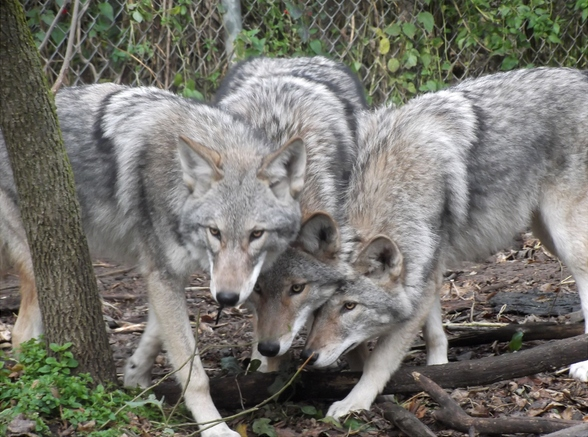
Captive-bred F_{1} grey wolf × coyote hybrids, Wildlife Science Center in Forest Lake, Minnesota

A coywolf is a canid hybrid descended from coyotes (Canis latrans), eastern wolves (Canis lycaon), grey wolves (Canis lupus), and dogs (Canis lupus familiaris). All of these species are members of the genus Canis with 78 chromosomes; therefore, the species can interbreed. One genetic study indicates that these species genetically diverged relatively recently (around 55,000–117,000 years ago). Genomic studies indicate that nearly all North American grey wolf populations possess some degree of admixture with coyotes following a geographic cline, with the lowest levels occurring in Alaska, and the highest in Ontario and Quebec, as well as Atlantic Canada. Another term for these hybrids is sometimes wolfote.

== Description ==
Hybrids of any combination tend to be larger than coyotes but smaller than wolves; they show behaviours intermediate between coyotes and the other parent's species. In one captive hybrid experiment, six F_{1} hybrid pups from a male northwestern grey wolf and a female coyote were measured shortly after birth with an average on their weights, total lengths, head lengths, body lengths, hind foot lengths, shoulder circumferences, and head circumferences compared with those on pure coyote pups at birth. Despite being delivered by a female coyote, the hybrid pups at birth were much larger and heavier than regular coyote pups born and measured around the same time. At six months of age, these hybrids were closely monitored at the Wildlife Science Center. Executive Director Peggy Callahan at the facility states that the howls of these hybrids are said to start off much like regular grey wolves with a deep strong vocalization, but changes partway into a coyote-like high pitched yipping.

Compared with pure coyotes, eastern wolf × coyote hybrids form more cooperative social groups and are generally less aggressive with each other while playing. Hybrids also reach sexual maturity when they are two years old, which is much later than occurs in pure coyotes.

== Varieties ==
=== Eastern coyotes ===
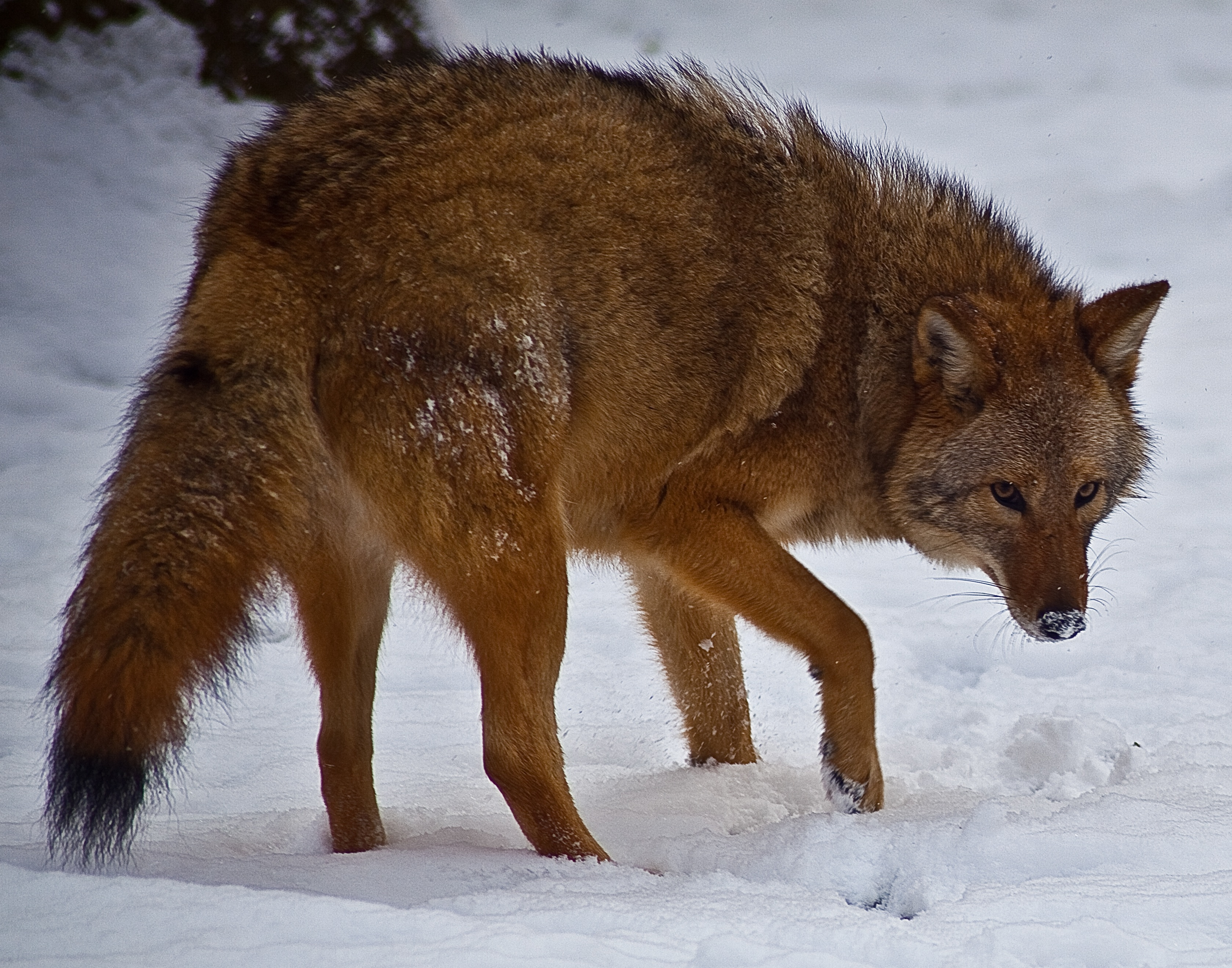
An Eastern coyote, a coyote-wolf hybrid in West Virginia near the Virginia state line.

Eastern coyotes range from New England, New York, New Jersey, Pennsylvania, Ohio, West Virginia, Maryland, Delaware, and Virginia. Their range also extends into the Canadian provinces of Ontario, Quebec, New Brunswick, Nova Scotia, Prince Edward Island and Newfoundland and Labrador. Coyotes and wolves hybridized in the Great Lakes region, followed by an eastern coyote expansion, creating the largest mammalian hybrid zone known. Extensive hunting of grey wolves over a period of 400 years caused a population decline that reduced the number of suitable mates, thus facilitating coyote genes swamping into the eastern wolf population. This has caused concern over the purity of remaining wolves in the area, and the resulting eastern coyotes are too small to substitute for pure wolves as apex predators of moose and deer.

The main nucleus of pure eastern wolves is currently concentrated within Algonquin Provincial Park. This susceptibility to hybridization led to the eastern wolf being listed as Special Concern under the Canadian Committee on the Status of Endangered Wildlife and with the Committee on the Status of Species at Risk in Ontario. By 2001, protection was extended to eastern wolves occurring on the outskirts of the park, thus no longer depriving Park eastern wolves of future pure-blooded mates. By 2012, the genetic composition of the park's eastern wolves was roughly restored to what it was in the mid-1960s, rather than in the 1980s–1990s, when the majority of wolves had large amounts of coyote DNA.

Aside from the combinations of coyotes and eastern wolves making up most of the modern day eastern coyote's gene pools, some of the coyotes in the northeastern United States have mild domestic dog (C. lupus familiaris) and western Great Plains grey wolf (C. l. nubilus) influences in their gene pool. This suggests that the eastern coyote is actually a four-in-one hybrid of coyotes, eastern wolves, western grey wolves, and dogs. The hybrids living in areas with higher white-tailed deer density often have higher degrees of wolf genes than those living in urban environments. The addition of domestic dog genes may have played a minor role in facilitating the eastern hybrids' adaptability to survive in human-developed areas.

The four-in-one hybrid theory was further explored in 2014, when Monzón and his team reanalyzed the tissue and SNP samples taken from 425 eastern coyotes to determine the degree of wolf and dog introgressions involved in each geographic range. The domestic dog allele averages 10% of the eastern coyote's genepool, while 26% is contributed by a cluster of both eastern wolves and western grey wolves. The remaining 64% matched mostly with coyotes. This analysis suggested that prior to the uniformity of its modern-day genetic makeup, multiple swarms of genetic exchanges between the coyotes, feral dogs, and the two distinct wolf populations present in the Great Lakes region may have occurred. Urban environments often favor coyote genes, while the ones in the rural and deep forest areas maintain higher levels of wolf content. A 2016 meta-analysis of 25 genetics studies from 1995 to 2013 found that the northeastern coywolf is 60% western coyote, 30% eastern wolf, and 10% domestic dog. Nevertheless, this hybrid canid is only now coming into contact with the southern wave of coyote migration into the southern United States.

=== Red wolves and eastern wolves ===
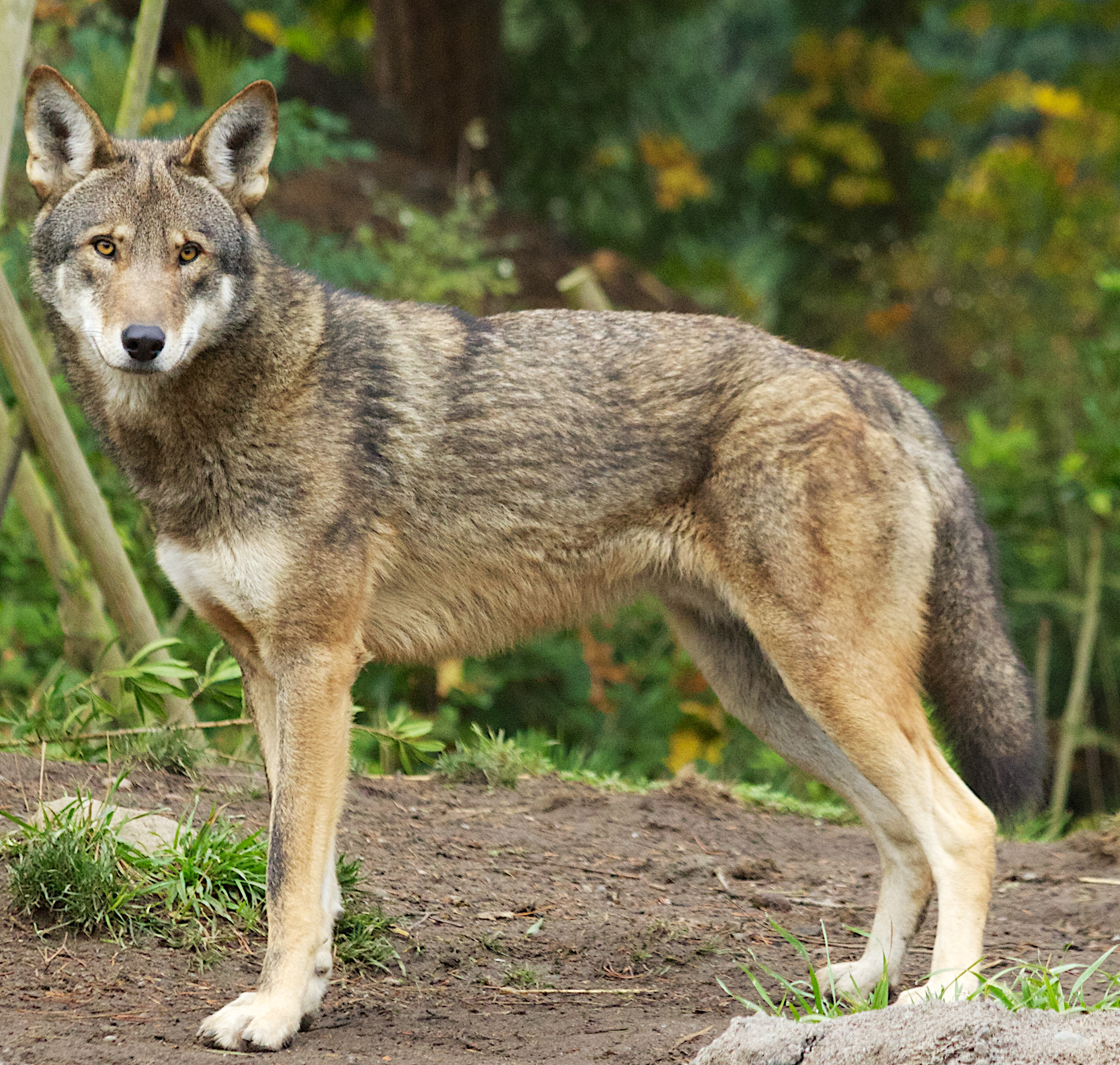
A Red wolf

The taxonomy of the red and eastern wolf of the Southeastern United States and the Great Lakes regions, respectively, has been long debated, with various schools of thought advocating that they represent either unique species or results of varying degrees of grey wolf × coyote admixture.

In May 2011, an examination of 48,000 single nucleotide polymorphisms in red wolves, eastern wolves, grey wolves, and dogs indicated that the red and eastern wolves were hybrid species, with the red wolf being 76% coyote and 20% grey wolf, and the eastern wolf being 58% grey wolf and 42% coyote, finding no evidence of being distinct species in either. The study was criticized for having used red wolves with recent coyote ancestry, and a reanalysis in 2012 indicated that it suffered from insufficient sampling.

A comprehensive review in 2012 further argued that the study's dog samples were unrepresentative of the species' global diversity, having been limited to boxers and poodles, and that the red wolf samples came from modern rather than historical specimens. The review was itself criticized by a panel of scientists selected for an independent peer review of its findings by the USFWS, which noted that the study's conclusion that the eastern wolf was a full species was based on insufficient evidence — just two unique nonrecombining markers.

In 2016, a whole-genome DNA study suggested that all of the North American canids, both wolves and coyotes, diverged from a common ancestor 6,000–117,000 years ago. The whole-genome sequence analysis shows that two endemic species of North American wolf, the red wolf and eastern wolf, are admixtures of the coyote and grey wolf.

In 2017 a group of canid researchers challenged the 2016 whole-genome DNA study's finding that the red wolf and the eastern wolf were the result of recent coyote–grey wolf hybridization. The group asserts the three-year generation time used to calculate the divergence periods between different species was lower than empirical estimates of 4.7 years. The group also found deficiencies in the previous study's selection of specimens (two representative coyotes were from areas where recent coyote and grey wolf mixing with eastern wolves is known to have occurred), the lack of certainty in the ancestry of the selected Algonquin wolves, and the grouping of Great Lakes and Algonquin wolves together as eastern wolves, despite opposing genetic evidence. As well, they asserted the 2016 study ignored the fact that there is no evidence of hybridization between coyotes and grey wolves.

The group also questioned the conclusions of genetic differentiation analysis in the study stating that results showing Great Lakes, Algonquin and red wolves, plus eastern coyotes differentiated from grey and Eurasian wolves were actually more consistent with an ancient hybridization or a distinct cladogenic origin for the red and Algonquin wolves than of a recent hybrid origin. The group further asserted that the levels of unique alleles for red and Algonquin wolves found the 2017 study were high enough to reveal a high degree of evolutionary distinctness. Therefore, the group argues that both the red wolf and the eastern wolf remain genetically distinct North American taxa. This was rebutted by the authors of the earlier study.

In 2021, an mDNA analysis of modern and extinct North American wolf-like canines indicates that the extinct Late Pleistocene Beringian wolf was the ancestor of the southern wolf clade, which includes the Mexican wolf and the Great Plains wolf. The Mexican wolf is the most ancestral of the grey wolves that live in North America today. The modern coyote appeared around 10,000 years ago. The most genetically basal coyote mDNA clade pre-dates the Last Glacial Maximum and is a haplotype that can only be found in the Eastern wolf. This implies that the large, wolf-like Pleistocene coyote was the ancestor of the Eastern wolf. Further, another ancient haplotype detected in the Eastern wolf can be found only in the Mexican wolf. The authors propose that Pleistocene coyote and Beringian wolf admixture led to the Eastern wolf long before the arrival of the modern coyote and the modern wolf.

A genomic study from 2023 supports that Eastern wolves evolved separately from Grey wolves for the last 67,000 years and experienced admixture with Coyotes 37,000 years ago. The Great Lakes wolves were the result of admixture between eastern wolves and grey wolves 8,000 years ago. Eastern coyotes were the result of admixture between eastern wolves and "western" coyotes during the last century.

==== Mexican wolf × coyote hybrids ====
In a study that analyzed the molecular genetics of coyotes, as well as samples of historical red wolves and Mexican wolves from Texas, a few coyote genetic markers have been found in the historical samples of some isolated Mexican wolf individuals. Similarly, grey wolf Y chromosomes have also been found in a few individual male Texan coyotes. This study suggested that although the Mexican wolf is generally less prone to hybridizations with coyotes, exceptional genetic exchanges with the Texan coyotes may have occurred among individual grey wolves from historical remnants before the population was completely extirpated in Texas. The resulting hybrids would later on melt back into the coyote populations as the wolves disappeared.

The same study discussed an alternative possibility that the red wolves, which also once overlapped with both species in central Texas, were involved in circuiting the gene flows between the coyotes and grey wolves, much like how the eastern wolf is suspected to have bridged gene flows between grey wolves and coyotes in the Great Lakes region, since direct hybridizations between coyotes and grey wolves is considered rare.

In tests performed on a stuffed carcass of what was initially labelled a chupacabra, mitochondrial DNA analysis conducted by Texas State University showed that it was a coyote, though subsequent tests revealed that it was a coyote × grey wolf hybrid sired by a male Mexican wolf.

=== Northwestern wolf × coyote hybrid experiment ===
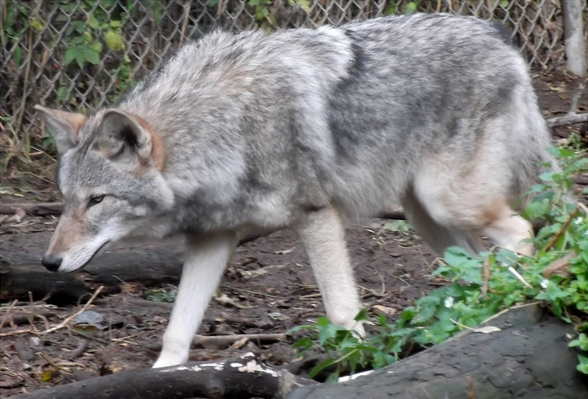
A F_{1} hybrid coyote-grey wolf hybrid, conceived in captivity

In 2013, the U.S. Department of Agriculture Wildlife Services conducted a captive-breeding experiment at their National Wildlife Research Center Predator Research Facility in Logan, Utah. Using grey wolves from British Columbia and western coyotes, they produced six hybrids, making this the first hybridization case between pure coyotes and northwestern wolves. The experiment, which used artificial insemination, was intended to determine whether or not the sperm of the larger grey wolves in the west was capable of fertilizing the egg cells of western coyotes. Aside from the historical hybridizations between coyotes and the smaller Mexican wolves in the south, as well as with eastern wolves and red wolves, grey wolves from the northwestern US and western provinces of Canada were not known to interbreed with coyotes in the wild, thus prompting the experiment.

The six resulting hybrids included four males and two females. At six months of age, the hybrids were closely monitored and were shown to display both physical and behavioral characteristics from both species, as well as some physical similarities to the eastern wolves, whose status as a distinct wolf species or as a genetically distinct subspecies of the grey wolf is controversial. Regardless, the result of this experiment concluded that northwestern wolves, much like many other canids, are capable of hybridizing with coyotes.

In 2015, a research team from the cell and microbiology department of Anoka-Ramsey Community College revealed that an F_{2} litter of two pups had been produced from two of the original hybrids. At the same time, despite the six F_{1}'s successful delivery from the same coyote, they were not all full siblings because multiple sperm from eight different northwestern wolves were used in their production. The successful production of the F_{2} litter, nonetheless, confirmed that hybrids of coyotes and northwestern wolves are just as fertile as hybrids of coyotes to eastern and red wolves. Both the F_{1} and F_{2} hybrids were found to be phenotypically intermediate between the western grey wolves and coyotes. Unlike the F_{1} hybrids, which were produced via artificial insemination, the F_{2} litter was produced from a natural breeding.

The study also discovered through sequencing 16S ribosomal RNA encoding genes that the F_{1} hybrids all have an intestinal microbiome distinct from both parent species, but which was once reported to be present in some grey wolves. Moreover, analysis of their complementary DNA and ribosomal RNA revealed that the hybrids have very differential gene expressions compared to those in grey wolf controls.

==== Coydogs ====
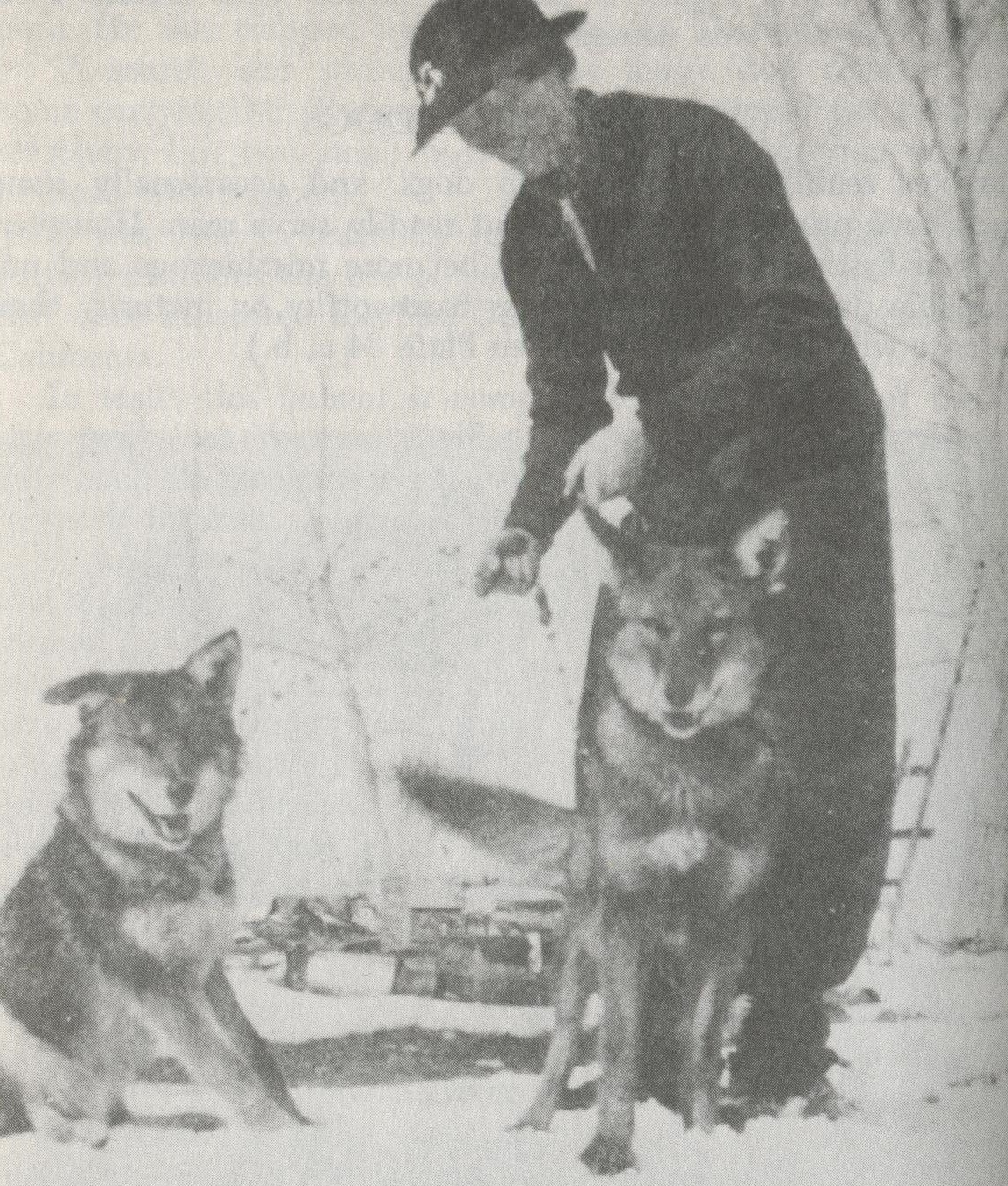
Coydogs in Wyoming, 1951

Hybrids between coyotes and domestic dogs have been bred in captivity, dating to pre-Columbian Mexico. Other specimens were later produced by mammal biologists mostly for research purposes. Domestic dogs are included in the grey wolf species. Hence, coydogs are another biological sub-variation of hybrids between coyotes and grey wolves – the dog being considered a domesticated subspecies of Canis lupus.

=== Galveston Island coyote ===
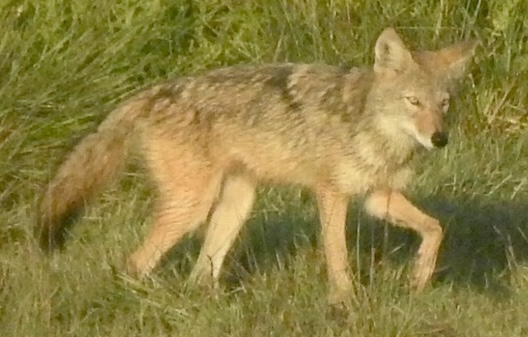
Coyote photographed in Galveston Island in 2022

A hybrid native to Galveston Island, Texas, has been identified as having ancestry from red wolves, southeastern coyotes, Mexican wolves, domestic dogs, and Texas gray wolves.

== See also ==
- Canid hybrid
- Coydog
- Dingo-dog hybrid
- Dogxim
- Jackal-dog hybrid
- Wolfdog
