= Tamaskan Dog =

Tamaskan
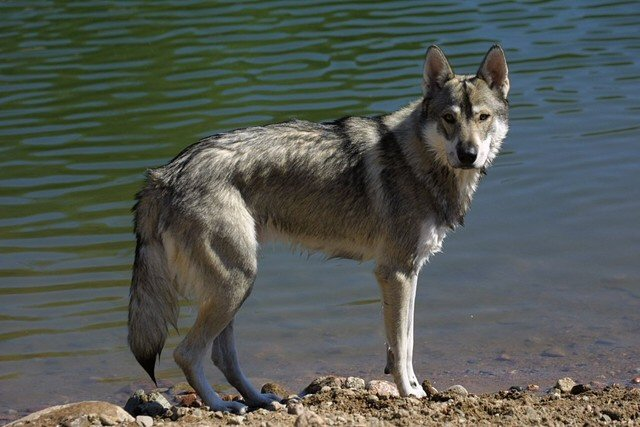
- A tamaskan dog
- Common nicknames: Tam, Tamaskan
- Origin: Finland
Traits
Height	Males	25–33 inches (64–84 cm)
	Females	24–28 inches (61–71 cm)
Weight	Males	65–95 pounds (29–43 kg)
	Females	55–85 pounds (25–39 kg)
- Coat: Thick double coat; dense undercoat and coarse outer coat. Each guard hair is agouti banded.
- Color: Wolf grey, red grey, black grey
- Litter size: 6-10 puppies
- Notes: recognized ARBA Breed details

Tamaskan dogs are a dog breed from Finland that have been selectively bred to resemble a wolf or wolfdog. Although their exact origins are uncertain, these mixed breed dogs were primarily arctic breed crosses of Alaskan husky, Alaskan Malamute, Canadian Eskimo dog, German shepherd, Labrador husky, and Siberian husky. Tamaskans are not recognized as a breed by the Fédération Cynologique Internationale but are recognized as a breed by the American Rare Breed Association.

== Northern Inuit dog ==
Some sources describe a northern Inuit dog, with the tamaskan as an offshoot, along with others such as the British timber dog and the utonagan, developed from a 1980s breeding project in the United Kingdom with the objective of producing a dog breed resembling wolves. Northern Inuit dogs originated from dogs of unknown breed ancestry imported from North America in the 1980s that were crossed with Alaskan Malamutes, German Shepherds, Siberian Huskies and possibly Samoyeds. The aim was to develop a dog resembling a wolf in appearance but suitable for companionship and trainable for various tasks. During its development, the northern Inuit dog breeding initiative diverged into several related breeds, including the tamaskan, the British timber dog, and the utonagan.

== Description ==
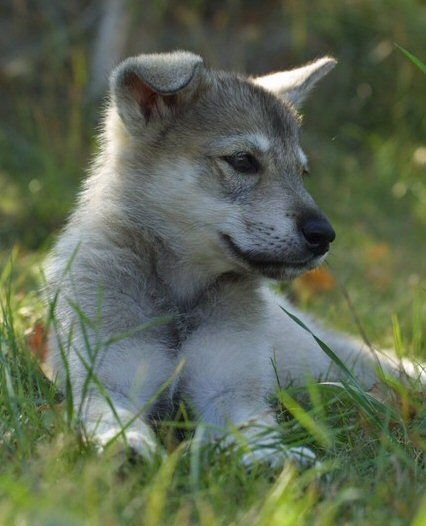
A Tamaskan puppy

Tamaskan are large, athletic dogs, and slightly taller than German Shepherds. With regard to build, they are larger than typical sled dogs but smaller than the Alaskan Malamute.

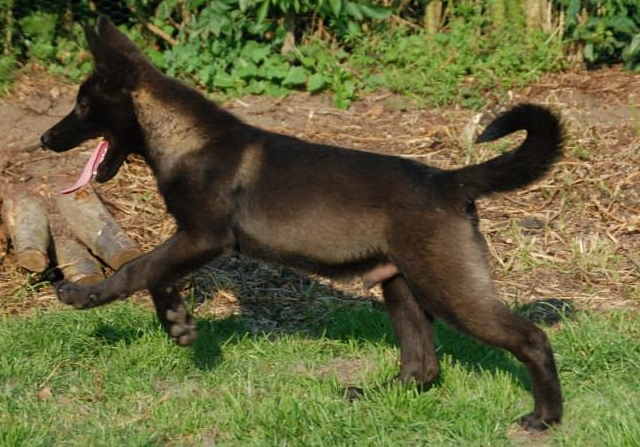
A black Tamaskan puppy

On average, Tamaskan adults measure around 24-28 inches (60–70 cm) tall at the shoulder and typically weigh between 55-88 pounds (25–40 kg)–the heaviest recorded Tamaskan males (to date) weigh just under 50 kg. Females are usually slightly smaller and lighter than males, with a distinct feminine appearance. Males are more heavyset with broader heads and a heavier bone structure. Tamaskan have a lupine appearance with a straight bushy tail and thick double coat that comes in three main colors: wolf gray, red gray, and black gray. Each guard hair is agouti banded along its length. The almond-shaped eyes range from yellow through to amber and brown, with lighter colored eyes being very rare. Blue eyes are not acceptable, nor are mismatched eyes.

Genetic testing has identified a color variant linked to partial recessive red traits that at least 50% of northern Inuit and tamaskan dogs carry. Initially detected in DNA samples from prehistoric dogs dating back 10,000 years, this variant was identified as one of the earliest mutations discovered in domestic canines.

== Health ==
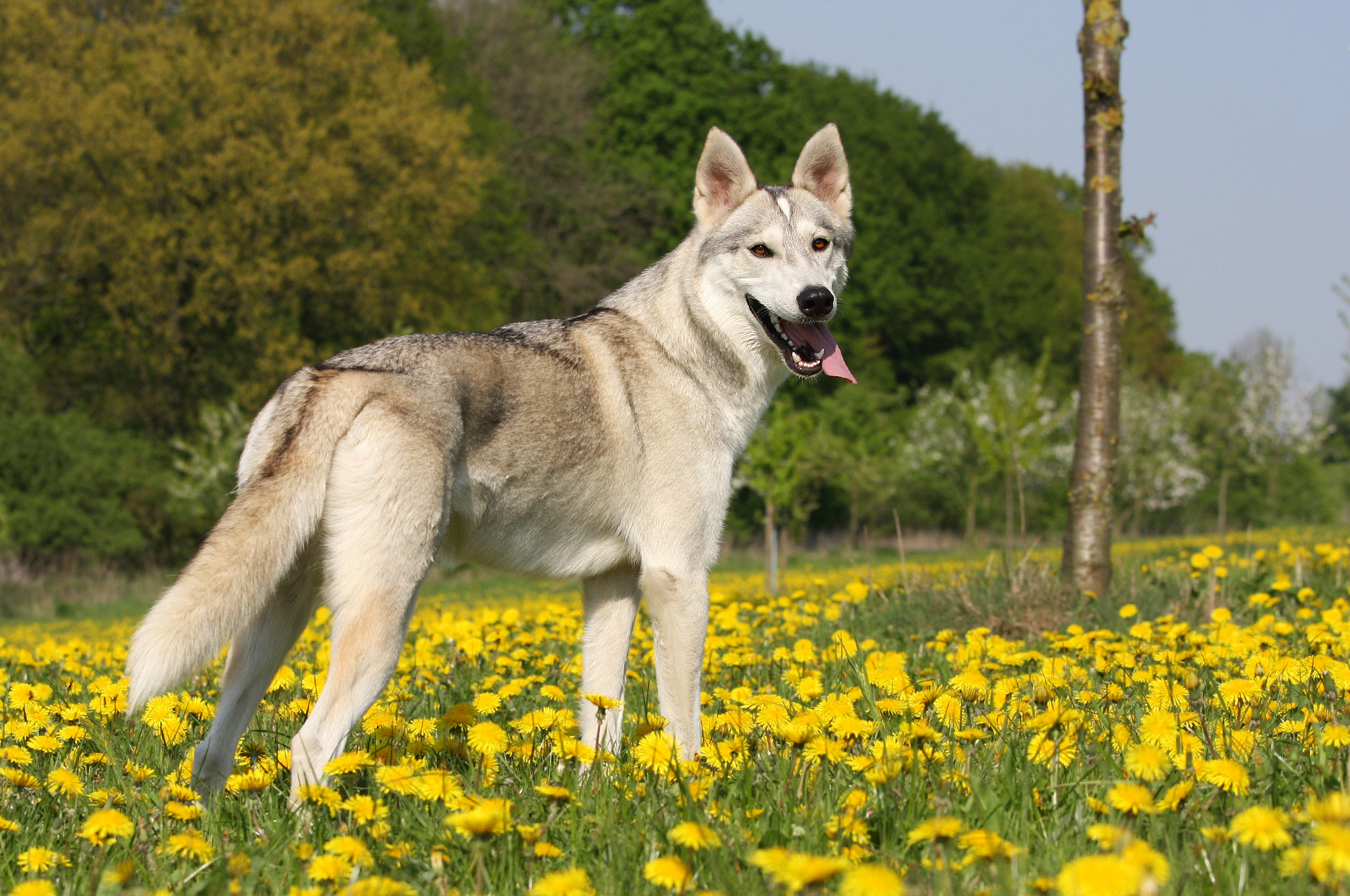
An adult female

Overall, the Tamaskan variety is healthy; only a few notable health issues affect a small percentage of the bloodlines to date. Roughly 10% of males suffer from cryptorchidism: undescended testes. With these cases, usually only one testicle fully descends within the scrotum, while the other testicle remains "hidden" up within the abdominal cavity. Epilepsy has been diagnosed in five dogs, affecting about 1 out of every 100 registered Tamaskan worldwide. Several dogs have been found to be carriers of degenerative myelopathy. As with all large breed dogs, hip dysplasia is a risk.

== History ==
In the 1980s, five dogs of Siberian Husky origin were imported into the United Kingdom from the United States. These dogs were then bred to Alaskan Malamutes, Siberian Huskies and German Shepherds to create a dog with a wolf like phenotype, but with a good temperament. In the ’80s, these dogs were labelled as wolf dogs or simply wolf lookalikes. Poor records were kept during this era and therefore the ancestry of most of these dogs is unknown.

Breed founders Lynn Hardey and Jennie Peacock were committee members of the British and International Utonagan Society, but believed the dogs were becoming too related to each other and decided to look for genetic diversity abroad. In Finland they found working husky crosses and purchased several to add to their lines. However, the majority of Utonagan breeders were not interested in the new additions and so the founders left to start the Tamaskan Dog Register in 2006.

=== Breed clubs ===
There are breed clubs in the United States (Tamaskan Dog Register), Canada (National Tamaskan Club of Canada), France (Club Français du Tamaskan), Germany (Tamaskan Club Germany), the Netherlands (Nederlandse Tamaskan Club), Croatia (Hrvatski Tamaskan Savez), and the United Kingdom (Tamaskan Dog Society of Great Britain).

== Famous Tamaskan dogs ==
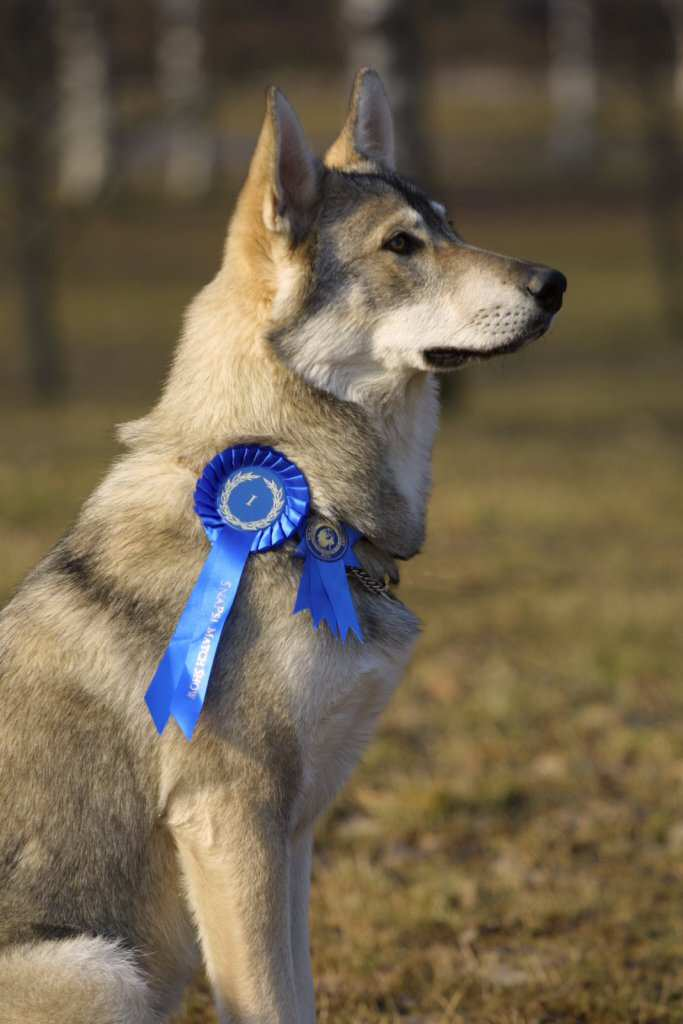
A prizewinning Tamaskan

In October 2007, a Tamaskan named Genghis Khan featured as a wolf in a music video for the band Lucretia Choir.

In September 2010, a TDR registered male Tamaskan named Wave became the official Live Mascot of North Carolina State University's football team: NC State Wolfpack. Wave (a.k.a. "Tuffy") now attends most home games and can be seen on the sidelines.

In September 2012, four Tamaskans were featured on the Croatian HRT 1 television program Kućni ljubimci.

In 2016, a Tamaskan named Luchta (White Elk Luchta) appeared on Broadway. Luchta played the role of "The Wolf" in Arthur Miller's The Crucible produced by Scott Rudin and directed by Ivo van Hove.

On 19 September 2017, Kaoru, a four-year-old therapy dog, was accompanied by her owner, another handler, and 10 other dogs on a hiking trail in Whistler, British Columbia, Canada. Kaoru provided support to many people, including children with autism. On the hike Kaoru was mistaken for a wolf by a hunter, who shot her at close range, killing her.

== In popular culture ==
- Northern Inuit dogs were used in the filming of the television series Game of Thrones to portray dire wolves.
- A Tamaskan dog named Luchta played a wolf in a 2016 Broadway production of The Crucible.
- A Tamaskan dog named Tuffy has been the live mascot for the NC State Wolfpack since 2010, appearing on the sidelines of football games, bowl games, and other football and men's basketball events.
- The Starz series Outlander uses northern Inuit dogs to portray Young Ian's "wolfdog," Rollo. The first, Dui (pronounced "Dewey"), short for Mac Dugh, appeared in seasons 4–6. His replacement, Yogi, assumed the role in season 7.

== See also ==
- Czechoslovakian Wolfdog
- Saarloos wolfdog
- Breeding back
