= Wolves as pets and working animals =

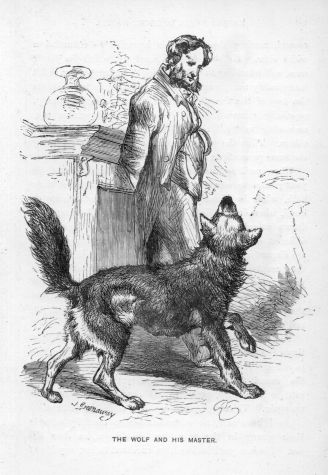
The Wolf and his Master, as illustrated by Harrison Weir in Stories of Animal Sagacity.

Wolves are sometimes kept as exotic pets, and in some rarer occasions, as working animals. Although closely related to domesticated dogs, wolves do not show the same tractability as dogs in living alongside humans, and generally, a greater amount of effort is required in order to obtain the same amount of reliability. Wolves also need much more space than dogs, about 25 to 40 square kilometres (10 to 15 sq mi) so they can exercise.

== Rearing ==
Captive wolf puppies are usually taken from their mother at the age of 14 days, preferably no later than 21 days. Wolf pups require more socialisation than dog pups, and will typically stop responding to socialisation at the age of 19 days, as opposed to dogs which can still be socialised at the age of 16 weeks. For the first four months of their lives, wolf pups need to be kept isolated from adult canines, except for a few brief visits per week, in order for them to properly imprint on humans. Pups will typically develop behavioural abnormalities if raised without another member of their own kind. Because wolf milk contains more arginine than can be found in puppy milk substitutes, an arginine supplement is needed when feeding pups below the weaning age. Failure to do so can result in the pups developing cataracts.

== Temperament ==
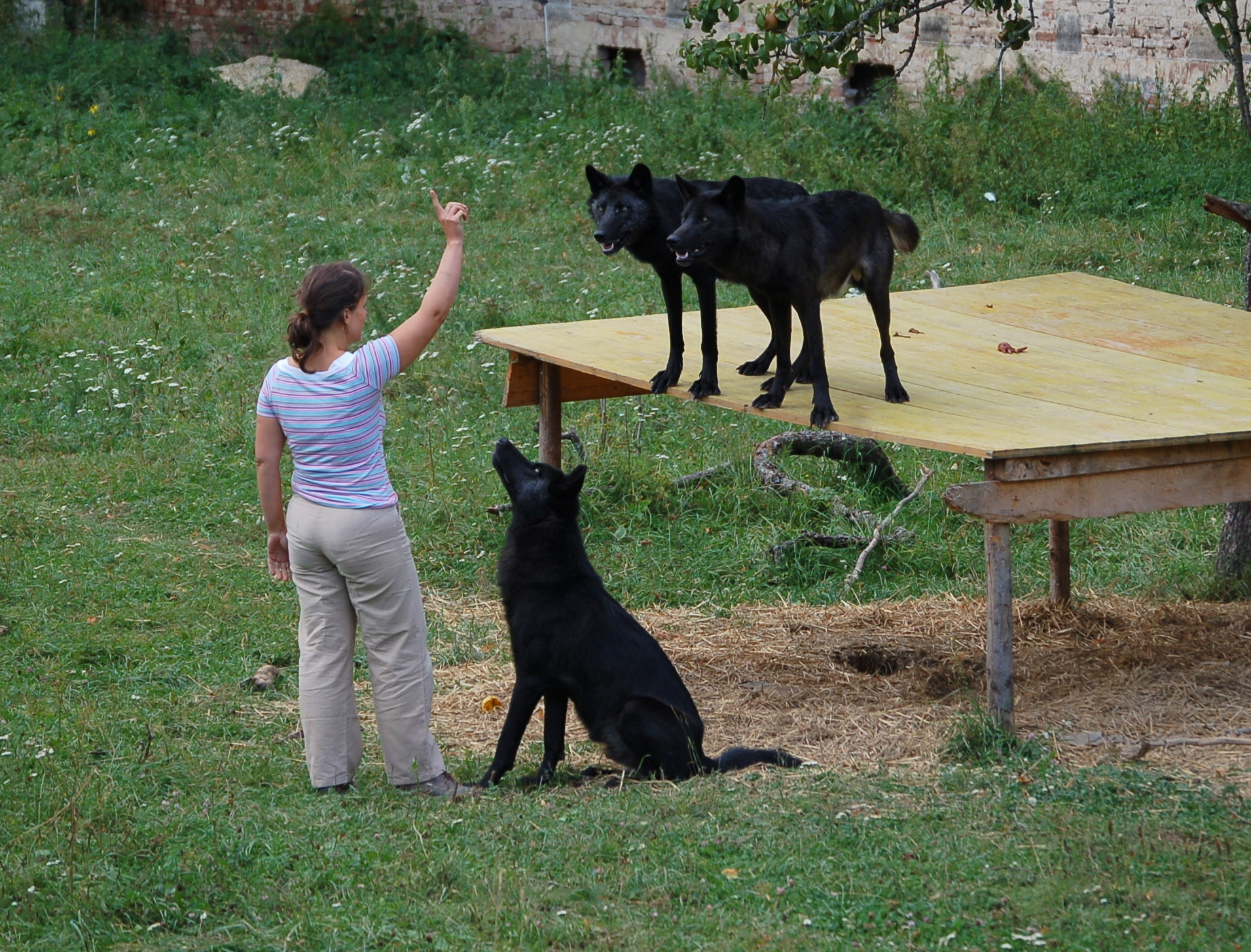
Captive wolves following hand gestures at the Wolf Science Center in Austria.

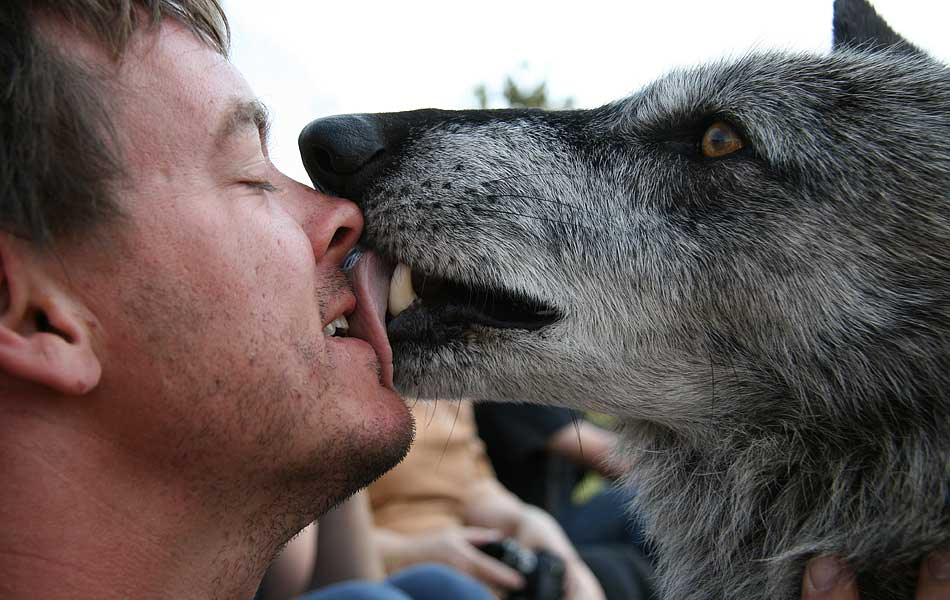
Raven, a former Ambassador wolf, licking a visitor at Mission: Wolf.

Captive wolves are generally shy and avoid eye contact with humans other than their primary human companion, as well as not listening to any commands made by any other humans. They usually vacate rooms or hide when a new person enters the establishment. Even seemingly friendly wolves need to be treated with caution, as captive wolves tend to view and treat people as other wolves, and will thus bite or dominate people in the same situation in which they would other wolves. Ordinary pet food is inadequate, as an adult wolf needs 1–2.5 kg (2–5 lbs) of meat daily along with bones, skin and fur to meet its nutritional requirements. Wolves may defend their food against people, and react violently to people trying to remove it. The exercise needs of a wolf exceed the average dog's demand. Because of this, captive wolves typically do not cope well in urban areas. Due to their talent at observational learning, adult captive wolves can quickly work out how to escape confinement, and require constant reinforcement by caretakers or owners, which makes raising wolves difficult for people who raise their pets in an even, rather than subordinate, environment.

Some pet wolves are euthanised or might be released into the wild where they are likely to starve or be killed by resident wolf packs in regions where they are still present. Abandoned or escaped captive wolves can be more destructive and pose a greater danger to humans and livestock than wild wolves, seeing as their habituation to humans causes them to lose their natural shyness. The Wolf of Gysinge is thought to have been one such animal. Keeping these animals at home can be a bad idea, as they are very destructive.

== Trainability ==
Though wolves are trainable, they lack the same degree of tractability seen in dogs. They are generally not as responsive as dogs to coercive techniques involving fear, aversion to stimuli, and force. Generally, far more work is required to obtain the same degree of reliability seen in most dogs. Even then, once a certain behavior has been repeated several times, wolves may get bored and ignore subsequent commands. Wolves are most responsive toward positive conditioning and rewards, though simple praise is not sufficient as in most dogs. Unlike dogs, wolves tend to respond more to hand signals than voice. Although they are more difficult to control than dogs, they can be easier to teach if the motivation exists.

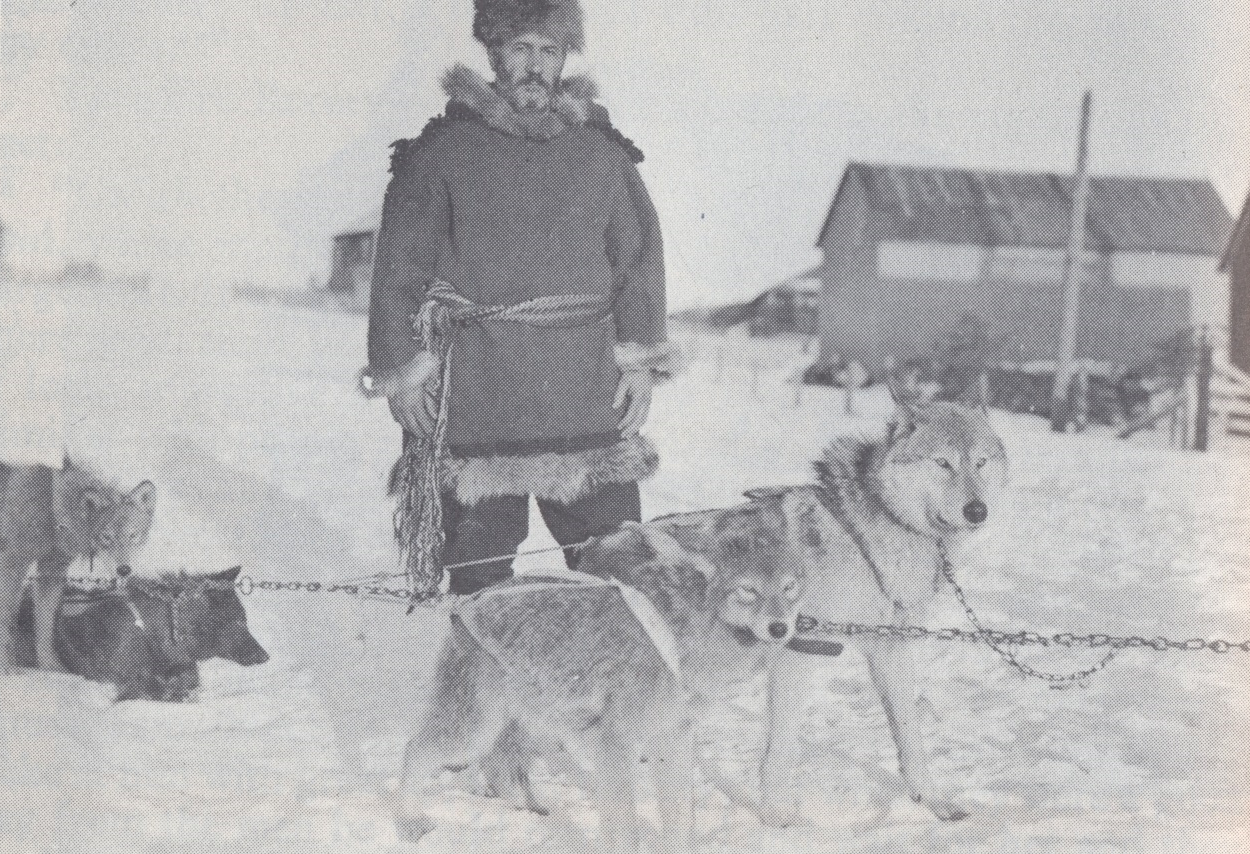
Timber wolves and coyotes used as draught animals in northern Ontario, 1923.

Wolves are less suitable than dogs for working. Swedish wolf biologist Erik Zimen once tried to form a dog sled team composed entirely of wolves. The experiment failed as the wolves ignored most commands and were far more prone to fighting than sled dogs. North American purebred wolves and wolfdogs were used as experimental attack dogs by the South African Defence Force in Apartheid South Africa in an attempt to breed animals capable of tracking guerrillas. Because the wolves would not follow even basic commands, the experiment was abandoned. However, their sense of smell can rival that of established scent hounds. According to reports published in 2006, ongoing research at the Perm Institute of Internal Troops in Russia demonstrated that wolf/dog cross-breeds took 15–20 seconds to track down a target in training sessions, whereas ordinary police dogs took 3–4 minutes. Their success has led to plans to use them as police dogs for the Russian police.

American biologist, Stanley P. Young, described tame wolves as thus:

Generally speaking, on the basis of their experience, tame wolves are strictly "one-man dogs". They may be confiding and playful with the man who raised them, or even with his whole family, if fed and cared for by them, but they are suspicious and timid in the presence of strangers. They invariably retain certain reactions of wolf nature, as for instance, an incorrigible desire to kill chickens or other small livestock whenever opportunity arises.

Several hunters of the USFWS kept wolf pups as pets, with the best results occurring when they were caught just after their eyes began opening. In contrast, pups taken at 3–4 weeks of age proved unmanageable, with only one in 11 of such pups becoming tame, despite one month of eight hours per day of socialization with people. However, John James Audubon recorded an instance of a wolf being trained to hunt deer in Kentucky, and Henry Wharton Shoemaker published a similar account of settlers in western and central Pennsylvania using wolves as hunting dogs. Buffon wrote in his Natural History of tamed wolves in Persia being trained to perform dances and tricks.

== See also ==
- Domestication of the dog
- Coydog
- Wolfdog

== Bibliography ==
- Young, Stanley P.; Goldman, Edward A. (1944). The Wolves of North America, Part I. New York, Dover Publications, Inc.
- Zimen, Erik (1981). The Wolf: His Place in the Natural World. Souvenir Press. ISBN 0-285-62411-3.
