= Wolf coyote =

The term "wolf coyote" may refer to:

- The coywolf, a hybrid between a wolf and a coyote
- Canis edwardii, an extinct species related to the modern coyote and red wolf
