= Inuit (disambiguation) =

The Inuit are a group of Arctic indigenous peoples living in North America.

Inuit may also refer to:

- Inuit languages, a language family spoken in the North American Arctic
- Inuit culture, various groups of indigenous peoples in the North American Arctic
- Northern Inuit Dog, a breed of dog
- Saturn's Inuit group of satellites, satellites of Saturn
