= Child of the Wolves =

1996 novel by Elizabeth Hall

- Author: Elizabeth Hall
- Language: English
- Genre: Children's literature
- Publisher: Yearling Books
- Publication date: 1996
- Publication place: United States

Child of the Wolves is a children's novel, published in 1996, about a Siberian Husky puppy that joins a wolf pack. It was written by Elizabeth Hall, wife of Island of the Blue Dolphins author, Scott O'Dell.

== Plot ==
Granite is born on a snowy April day in Alaska. For the first weeks of his life, he lives in the kennels, playing with his siblings Digger, Cricket, and Nugget. Even though their mother Seppala gets sick, life is good there. His owners, Tim and Kate, take good care of him. Granite differs from the other pups. He is not eager to train to be a sled dog.

One day, when the pups are ten-weeks-old, a man shows up to buy Granite and his sister Cricket. Even though Cricket is bought and does not mind going to a new home, Granite does not want to leave his mother and runs away from where he grew up. He runs away into the Alaskan wilderness. After days wandering alone, hungry and injured, the Siberian husky puppy meets a wolf pack, led by a black wolf named Ebony and his mate, Snowdrift the white wolf, whose pups were kidnapped weeks before. She takes Granite in. Snowdrift raises the dog as a foster son and teaches him to hunt mice. That seems to help her get over some pain in losing her pups. It is mentioned that her pups were stolen by humans who wanted to breed young wolves to huskies, for wolfdogs are worth a lot of money.

Even though he protects Granite, Ebony does not like him, and neither do Strider (Ebony's brother, Granite's chief tormentor), Roamer (Ebony and Snowdrift's two-year-old son), and Breeze (a female wolf who came to them from a pack in the west). The other wolf who likes Granite is Snowdrift's yearling son, Climber. Granite and Climber become fast friends. Granite is less afraid of Climber because the young wolf had a "husky face", and Climber was pleased to have a younger member (so his rank rises) regardless of Granite being a dog. Another reason the pair play together is that Climber is still young, and was a pup not a long time ago. Ebony pretends the dog is not there, and Breeze feeds Granite only to humor Ebony. Roamer and Strider feed him just to show Snowdrift. When she is not there, they take back what they fed Granite. Strider, later on, pretends to give Granite a lesson and lures the young dog into attacking a porcupine. Granite got tricked and a face full of quills.

Granite hopes to please Ebony by trying to catch a fox but nearly loses his life. He nearly runs into a trap, but Breeze stops him just in time. He is, again, scorned by the others for his lousiness. However, later on, Climber is killed during a moose hunt, and Granite must try to earn his place in the pack, while dodging Roamer and Strider and other dangers of the Alaskan wilderness. Granite then runs away, overwhelmed by the torments from Roamer and Strider. Granite proves to be no longer a puppy who cannot fill his own stomach. He does fine save for the dark cloud of loneliness that grows bigger each day. He meets another pack of wolves when he intrudes into their territory. They welcome the dog with slashing teeth. Granite returns to Ebony's country, and the black wolf, though angry, lets him rejoin the pack.

Meanwhile, Snowdrift attempts to search for her lost pups but is shot by hunters. The rest of the pack finds her, though she is blind and wounded. While Snowdrift recovers, Breeze is almost kind to the dog and teaches him how to hunt salmon. In the fall, Granite kills a marmot, but Roamer tries to take it away. Granite fights the young black wolf and wins, and Roamer dares not to challenge him again. In the end, Granite saves Snowdrift's life. Ebony lets the dog hunt alongside him, making Granite's dream come true. Even Strider is friendly and no longer challenges the dog. Granite, now more than two years old, realizes that he is home.

== Characters ==
- Granite: The protagonist. As a puppy, he was bought along with his sister by a strange man, but had escaped and fled into the Alaskan wilderness. He was adopted by a bereaved Snowdrift and welcomed with great reluctance into the pack by the other wolves.
- Digger, Nugget, and Cricket: Granite's younger siblings. Digger is the biggest puppy in the litter, and a close playmate of Granite's. Unlike his mother and siblings, he is black instead of gray. In the fifth chapter, Tim had stated that he was going to be kept while the others were sold. Nugget is the runt of the litter and not one for fighting, choosing instead to play with a water pan instead of with a coil of rope. Cricket is the only female pup in Seppala's litter who was purchased by the stranger in the fifth chapter.
- Seppala: Granite's mother. Early in the book, she became sick, but by the end of the fourth chapter, she has gotten well. She is last seen comforting Granite before he is sold to a strange man.
- Tim and Kate: The couple who owns Seppala and several other huskies. At the start of the fifth chapter, Tim was mistakenly called "Tom."
- Snowdrift: A white wolf; Ebony's mate and the alpha female of the wolf pack Granite joins. She is the mother of Roamer, Climber, and five wolf pups who were kidnapped by two men seeking for wolves to breed with dogs. During a search for her pups when Granite is older, Snowdrift is blinded by a hunter shooting from a plane.
- Ebony: A black wolf; the alpha male of the wolf pack Granite joins.
- Strider: Described as a large gray wolf with a white chest, Strider is Ebony's brother and Granite's chief tormentor. He is also the oldest son.
- Roamer: Ebony and Snowdrift's son. Like Strider, Roamer also tormented Granite, but the dog eventually stood up to him, and he never bothered him again.
- Climber: A yearling wolf and the second son of Snowdrift and Ebony. He was the only other wolf aside from Snowdrift who was kind to Granite. He was killed during a moose hunt.
