= Wolfdog =

Dog-wolf hybrid

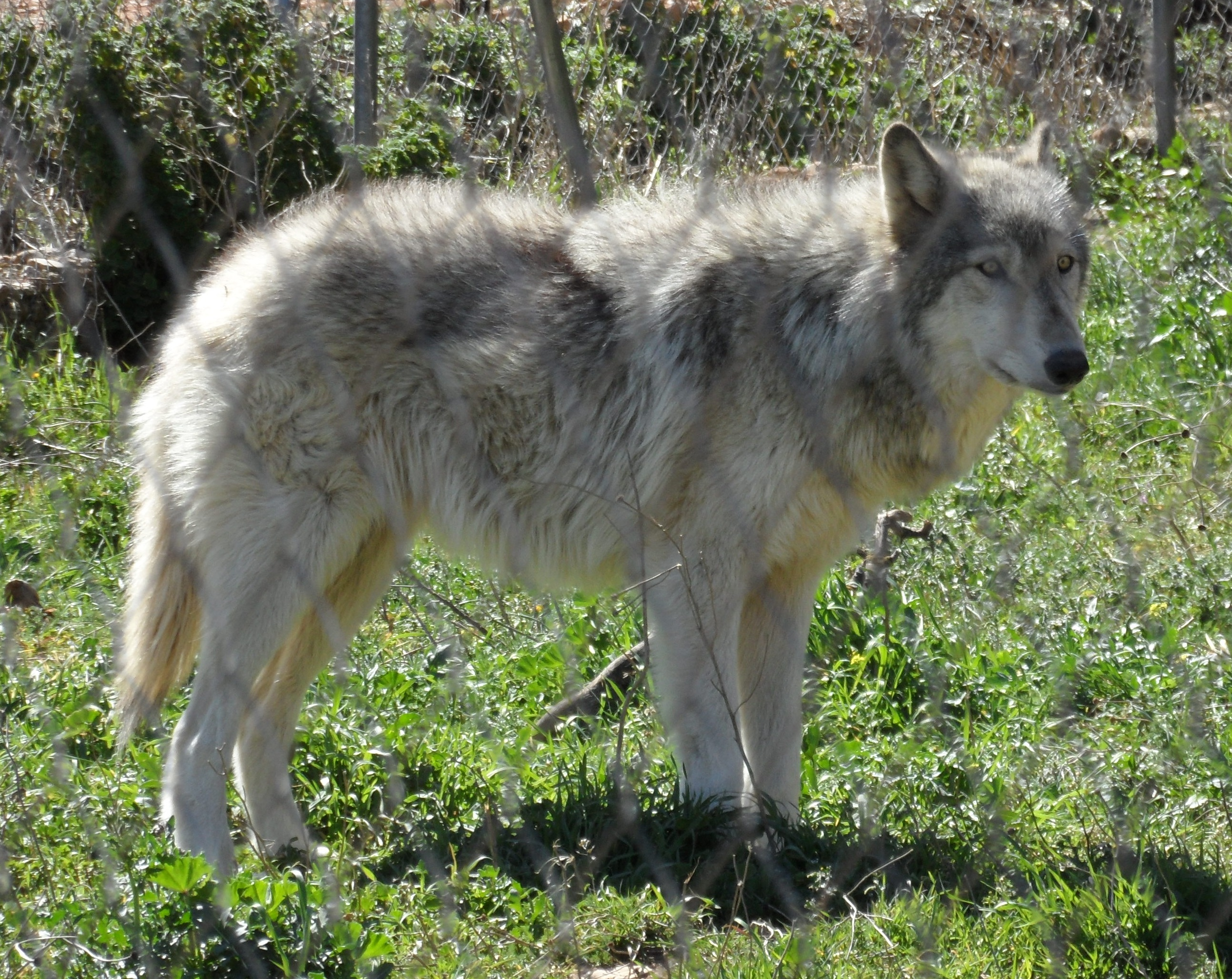
- An Arctic wolf/Alaskan Malamute hybrid from Lobo Park, Antequera

A wolfdog is a canine hybrid produced by the mating of a domestic dog (Canis familiaris) with a wolf; this can be a gray wolf (Canis lupus), an eastern wolf (Canis lycaon), a red wolf (Canis rufus), or an Ethiopian wolf (Canis simensis). They can occur through admixture in the wild or through intentional breeding by humans.

== Admixture ==
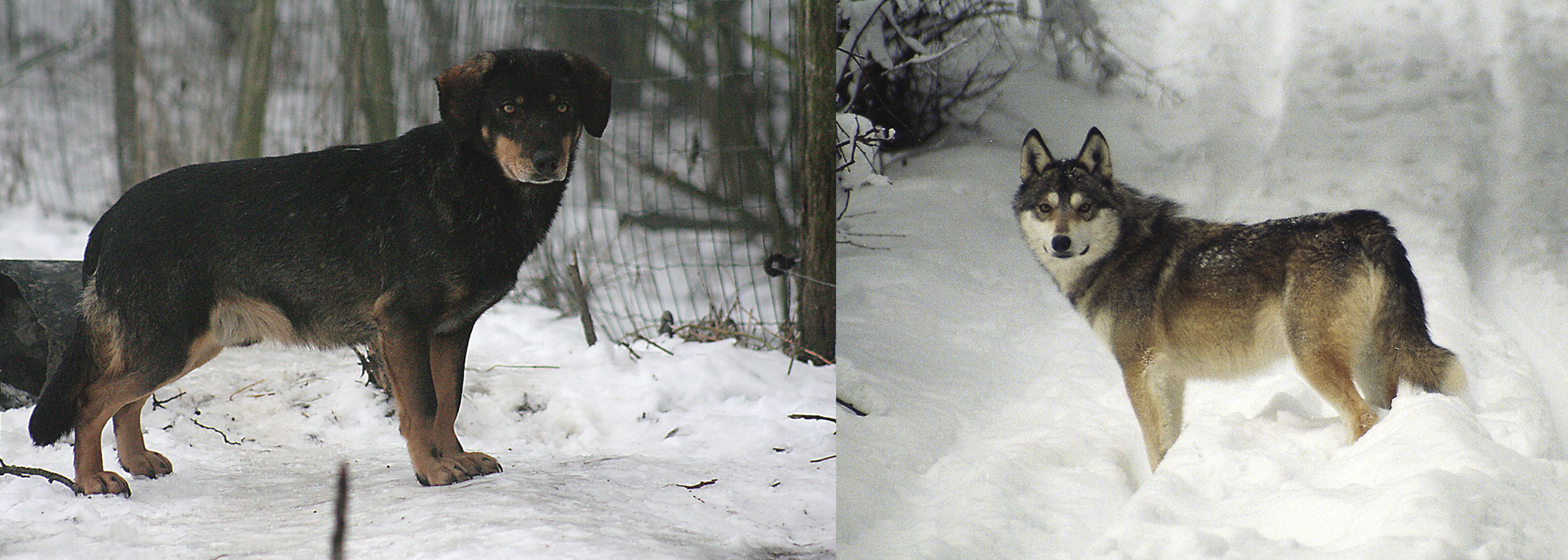
Hybrids in eastern Poland in the Wildlife Park Kadzidłowo. To the left: Parents: female wolf and male Gończy Polski; right: parents: female wolf and male West Siberian Laika.

Admixture between domestic dogs and other subspecies of gray wolves are the most common wolfdogs since dogs and gray wolves are considered the same species, are genetically very close and have shared vast portions of their ranges for millennia. Such admixture in the wild have been detected in many populations scattered throughout Europe and North America, usually occurring in areas where wolf populations have declined from human impacts and persecutions.

At the same time, wolfdogs are also often bred in captivity for various purposes. A mixture of dogs and two other North American wolf species have also occurred historically in the wild, although it is often difficult for biologists to discriminate the dog genes in the eastern timber and red wolves from the gray wolf genes also present in these wolf species due to their historical overlaps with North American gray wolves as well as with coyotes, both of which have introgressed into the eastern timber and red wolf gene pools. At the same time, because many isolated populations of the three wolf species in North America have also mixed with coyotes in the wild, it has been speculated by some biologists that some of the coywolf hybrids in the northeastern third of the continent may also have both coydogs and wolfdogs in their gene pool. Hybrids between dogs and Ethiopian wolves discovered in the Ethiopian Highlands likely originated from past interactions between free-roaming feral dogs and Ethiopian wolves living in isolated areas.

Recognized wolfdog breeds by the FCI are the Czechoslovakian Wolfdog and the Saarloos Wolfdog.

There are a range of experts who believe that they can tell the difference between a wolf, a dog, and a wolfdog, but have been proven incorrect when providing their evidence before courts of law.

== History ==
Whole genome sequencing has been used to study gene flow between wild and domestic species. There is evidence of widespread gene-flow from dogs into wolf populations, and very few deliberate crossings of wolves with dogs, such as the Saarloos Wolfdog. However, the global dog population forms a genetic cluster with little evidence for gene flow from wolves into dogs. Ancient DNA shows that dogs from Europe over 5,000 years ago also show little evidence of interbreeding with wild canids.

=== Prehistoric wolfdogs ===
A 1982 study of canine skulls from Wyoming dating back 10,000 years ago identified some that match the morphology of wolfdogs. This study was rebutted as not providing convincing evidence four years later.

=== Teotihuacan wolfdogs ===
In 2010, archeologists found the remains of wolf-dogs in a warrior's burial in Mexico's central valley that date about two thousand years ago, therefore what was once thought as coyotes depicted in Teotihuacan civilization art are being re-examined.

=== New World black wolves ===
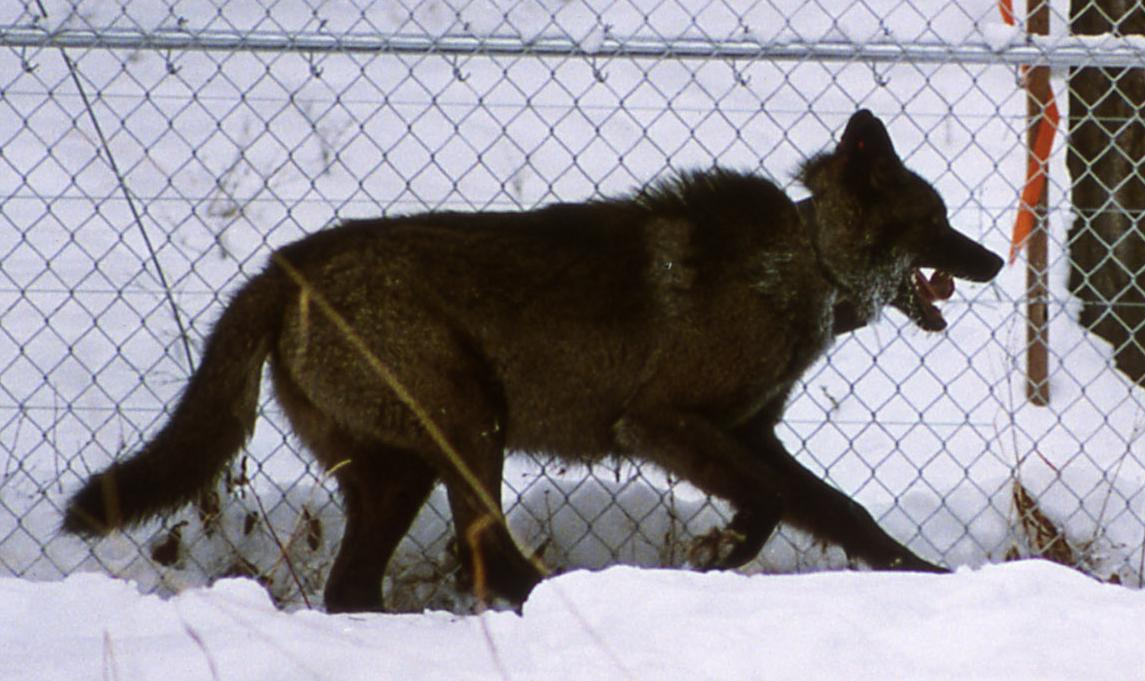
Genetic research has shown that wolves with black pelts owe their coloration to a mutation that first arose in domestic dogs.

Genetic research revealed that wolves with black pelts owe their distinctive coloration to a mutation that entered the wolf population through admixture with the domestic dog. Adolph Murie was among the first wolf biologists to speculate that the wide color variation in wolves was due to interbreeding with dogs;

"I suppose that some of the variability exhibited in these wolves could have resulted from crossings in the wild with dogs. Such crosses in the wild have been reported and the wolf in captivity crosses readily with dogs. Some years ago at Circle, Alaska, a wolf hung around the settlement for some time and some of the dogs were seen with it. The people thought that the wolf was a female attracted to the dogs during the breeding period. However, considerable variability is probably inherent in the species, enough perhaps to account for the variations noted in the park and in skins examined. The amount of crossing with dogs has probably not been sufficient to alter much the genetic composition of the wolf population."

— Murie, Adolph (1944). The Wolves of Mount McKinley. University of Washington Press. ISBN 0-295-96203-8, ISBN 978-0-295-96203-0.

In 2008, it was discovered that a gene mutation responsible for the protein beta-defensin 3 is responsible for the black coat color in dogs. The same mutation was responsible for black wolves in North America and the Italian Apennines, with the mutation having arisen in dogs 13,000 to 120,000 years ago, with a preferred date of 47,000 years ago after comparing large sections of wolf, dog, and coyote genomes. Robert K. Wayne, a canine evolutionary biologist, stated that he believed that dogs were the first to have the mutation. He further stated that even if it originally arose in Eurasian wolves, it was passed on to dogs who, soon after their arrival, brought it to the New World and then passed it to wolves and coyotes. Black wolves with recent dog ancestry tend to retain black pigment longer as they age.

=== North American gray wolf-domestic dog admixture ===
As of 1999 in the United States, over 100,000 wolfdogs existed. In first-generation wolfdogs, gray wolves are most often crossed with wolf-like dogs (such as German Shepherd Dogs, Siberian Huskies, and Alaskan Malamutes) for an appearance most appealing to owners desiring an exotic pet.

== Documented breeding ==
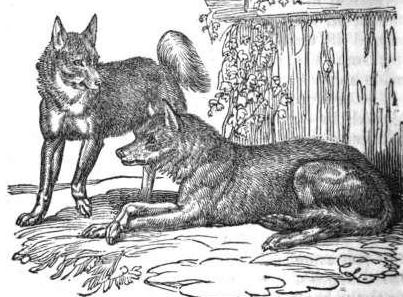
"Mixed breed Dog and Wolf" from The Menageries: Quadrupeds Described and Drawn from Living Subjects by William Ogilby, 1829

The first record of wolfdog breeding in Great Britain comes from the year 1766 when what is thought was a male wolf mated with a dog identified in the language of the day as a "Pomeranian", although it may have differed from the modern Pomeranian breed. The union resulted in a litter of nine pups. Wolfdogs were occasionally purchased by English noblemen, who viewed them as a scientific curiosity. Wolfdogs were popular exhibits in British menageries and zoos.

Six breeds of dog exist that acknowledge a significant amount of recent wolf-dog admixture in their creation. One breed is the "wolamute", a.k.a. "malawolf", a cross between an Alaskan Malamute and a timber wolf. Four breeds were the result of intentional crosses with German Shepherd Dogs and have distinguishing characteristics of appearance that may reflect the varying subspecies of wolf that contributed to their foundation stock. Other, more unusual crosses have occurred; recent experiments in Germany were conducted in the crossing of wolves and Poodles. The intent behind creating the breeds has ranged widely from simply the desire for a recognizable companion high-content wolfdog to professional military working dogs.

=== The Saarloos Wolfdog ===
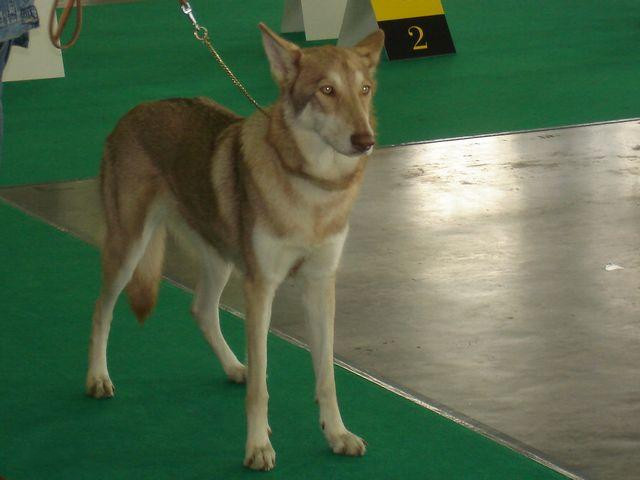
A Saarloos Wolfdog

In 1932, Dutch breeder Leendert Saarloos crossed a male German Shepherd dog with a female European wolf. He then bred the female offspring back with the male German Shepherd, creating the Saarloos wolfdog. The breed was created to be a hardy, self-reliant companion and house dog. The Dutch Kennel Club recognized the breed in 1975. To honor its creator they changed the name to "Saarloos Wolfdog". In 1981, the breed was recognized by the Fédération Cynologique Internationale (FCI).

=== The Czechoslovakian Wolfdog ===
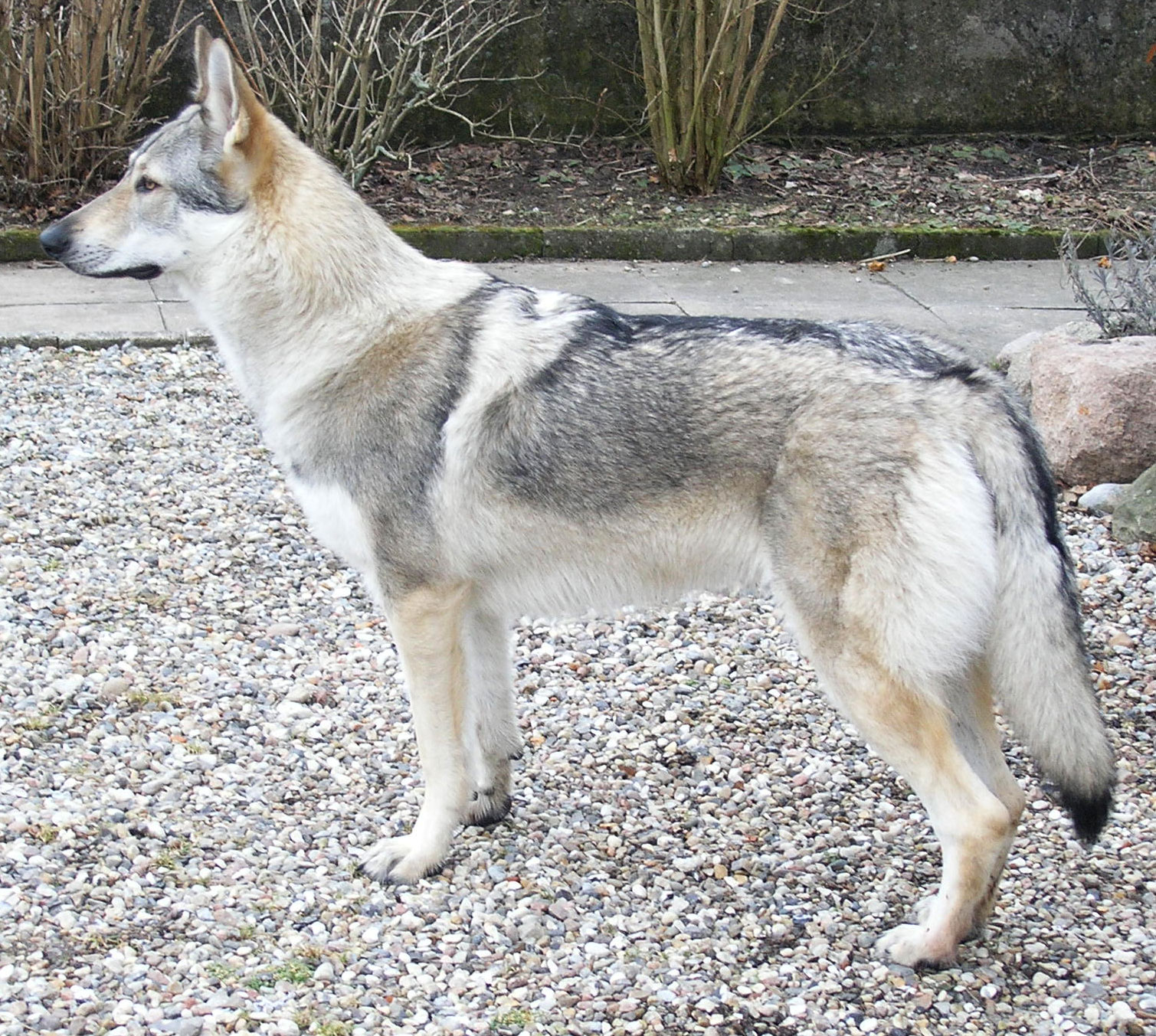
A Czechoslovakian Wolfdog

In the 1950s, the Czechoslovakian Wolfdog was also created to work on border patrol in the countries now known as Slovakia and the Czech Republic. It was originally bred from lines of German Shepherds with Carpathian grey wolves. It was officially recognized as a national breed in Czechoslovakia in 1982, and later was recognized by the Fédération Cynologique Internationale, the American Kennel Club's Foundation Stock Service and the United Kennel Club, and today is used in agility, obedience, search and rescue, police work, therapy work, and herding in Europe and the United States.

=== Volkosob ===
The Volkosob (Russian: Волкособ, plural: Волкособы, Volkosoby) was initially developed in the 1990s after the fall of the Soviet Union. Russian border guards wanted a dog that would possess the trainability and pack mentality of the German Shepherd, combined with the strength, superior senses and cold-resistance of a wild wolf, able to cope in the harsh conditions of the vast Russian borders. In 2000, a Caspian Steppe Wolf, noted for being unusually friendly and cooperative towards humans, was bred with German Shepherds of an East European Shepherd line, until an F3 generation was standardised. Unlike the previous hybrids, the Volkosob was the only breed that was an effective border guardian as they are renowned for not being too shy.

== Livestock guardian dogs ==
A 2014 study found that 20% of wolves and 37% of dogs shared the same mitochondrial haplotypes in Georgia. More than 13% of the studied wolves had detectable dog ancestry and more than 10% of the dogs had detectable wolf ancestry. The results of the study suggest that admixture between wolves and dogs is a common event in the areas where large livestock guardian dogs are held in a traditional way, and that gene flow between dogs and gray wolves was an important force influencing gene pool of dogs for millennia since early domestication events.

== Wolfdogs in the wild ==
Hybridization between wolves and dogs typically occurs when the wolf population is under strong hunting pressure and its structure is disrupted due to a high number of free-ranging dogs. Wolves typically display aggressiveness toward dogs, but a wolf can change its behaviour and become playful or submissive when it becomes socially isolated.

Admixture in the wild usually occurs near human habitations where wolf density is low and dogs are common. However, there were several reported cases of wolfdogs in areas with normal wolf densities in the former Soviet Union. Wild wolfdogs were occasionally hunted by European aristocracy, and were termed lycisca to distinguish them from common wolves. Noted historic cases (such as the Beast of Gévaudan) of large wolves that were abnormally aggressive toward humans, may be attributable to wolf-dog mating. In Europe, unintentional mating of dogs and wild wolves have been confirmed in some populations through genetic testing. As the survival of some Continental European wolf packs is severely threatened, scientists fear that the creation of wolfdog populations in the wild is a threat to the continued existence of European wolf populations. However, extensive admixture between wolf and dog is not supported by morphological evidence, and analyses of mtDNA sequences have revealed that such mating is rare.

In 1997, during the Mexican Wolf Arizona Reintroduction, controversy arose when a captive pack at Carlsbad designated for release was found by Roy McBride, who had captured many wolves for the recovery programme in the 1970s, to be largely composed of wolf-dogs. Though staff initially argued that the animals' odd appearance was due to captivity and diet, it was later decided to euthanise them.

In 2018, a study compared the sequences of 61,000 single-nucleotide polymorphisms (mutations) taken from across the genome of grey wolves. The study indicated that there exists individual wolves of dog-wolf ancestry in most of the wolf populations of Eurasia, but less so in North America. The admixture has been occurring across different time scales and was not a recent event. Low-level admixture did not reduce the wolf distinctiveness.

In September-November 2018, in the Osogovo mountainous region along the border between Bulgaria and North Macedonia a putative grey wolf was recorded by camera to be living with a pack of 10 feral dogs, and by its behaviour and phenotype was assumed to be a wolf-dog hybrid.

== Breed-specific legislation ==
The wolfdog has been the center of controversy for much of its history, and most breed-specific legislation is either the result of the animal's perceived danger or its categorization as protected native wildlife. The Humane Society of the United States, the RSPCA, Ottawa Humane Society, the Dogs Trust, and the Wolf Specialist Group of the IUCN Species Survival Commission consider wolfdogs to be wild animals and therefore unsuitable as pets, and support an international ban on the private possession, breeding, and sale of wolfdogs.

According to the National Wolfdog Alliance, 40 U.S. states effectively forbid the ownership, breeding, and importation of wolfdogs, while others impose some form of regulation upon ownership. In Canada, the provinces of Alberta, Manitoba, Newfoundland and Labrador, and Prince Edward Island prohibit wolfdogs as pets. Most European nations have either outlawed the animal entirely or put restrictions on ownership. Wolfdogs were among the breeds banned from the U.S. Marine Corps base at Camp Pendleton and elsewhere after a fatal dog attack by a pit bull on a child.

== Description ==
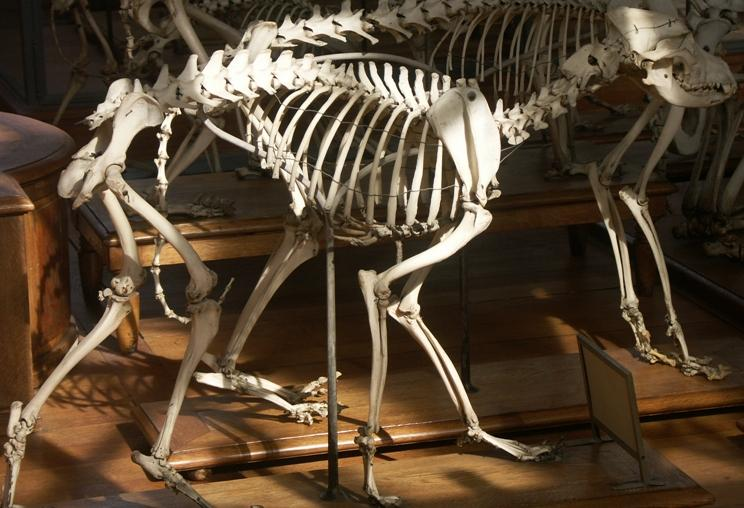
Skeleton of a wolf-dog hybrid from the Muséum national d'histoire naturelle

The physical characteristics of an animal created by breeding a wolf to a dog are not predictable, similar to that of mixed-breed dogs. In many cases the resulting adult wolfdog may be larger than either of its parents due to the genetic phenomenon of heterosis (commonly known as hybrid vigor). Breeding experiments in Germany with poodles and wolves, and later on with the resulting wolfdogs showed unrestricted fertility, mating via free choice and no significant problems of communication (even after a few generations). However, the offspring of poodles with either coyotes and jackals, all showed a decrease in fertility, significant communication problems, and an increase of genetic diseases after three generations of interbreeding between the hybrids. The researchers therefore concluded that domestic dogs and wolves are the same species.

Wolfdogs display a wide variety of appearances, ranging from a resemblance to dogs without wolf blood to animals that are often mistaken for full-blooded wolves. A lengthy study by DEFRA and the RSPCA found several examples of misrepresentation by breeders and indeterminate levels of actual wolf pedigree in many animals sold as wolfdogs. The report noted that uneducated citizens misidentify dogs with wolf-like appearance as wolfdogs. Wolfdogs tend to have somewhat smaller heads than pure wolves, with larger, pointier ears that lack the dense fur commonly seen in those of wolves. Fur markings also tend to be very distinctive and not well blended. Black-colored wolfdogs tend to retain black pigment longer as they age, compared to black wolves. In some cases, the presence of dewclaws on the hind feet is considered a useful, but not absolute, indicator of dog gene contamination in wild wolves. Dewclaws are the vestigial first toes, which are common on the hind legs of domestic dogs but thought absent from pure wolves, which only have four hind toes.

Observations on wild wolfdogs in the former Soviet Union indicate that in a wild state these may form larger packs than pure wolves, and have greater endurance when chasing prey. High wolf-content wolfdogs typically have longer canine teeth than dogs of comparable size, with some officers in the South African Defence Force commenting that the animals are capable of biting through the toughest padding "like a knife through butter".

Tests undertaken in the Perm Institute of Interior Forces in Russia demonstrated that high wolf-content wolfdogs took 15–20 seconds to track down a target in training sessions, whereas ordinary police dogs took 3–4 minutes. The scientific evidence to support the claims by wolfdog researchers is minimal, and more research has been called for.

== Health ==
Wolfdogs are generally said to be naturally healthy animals, and are affected by fewer inherited diseases than most breeds of dog. Wolfdogs are usually healthier than either parent due to heterosis. There is some controversy over the effectiveness of the standard dog/cat rabies vaccine on a wolfdog. The USDA has not to date approved any rabies vaccine for use in wolfdogs, though they do recommend an off-label use of the vaccine. Wolfdog owners and breeders purport that the lack of official approval is a political move to prevent condoning wolfdog ownership.

== Temperament and behavior ==
Wolfdogs are a mixture of genetic traits, which results in less predictable behavior patterns compared to either the wolf or dog. The adult behavior of wolfdog pups also cannot be predicted with comparable certainty to dog pups, even in third-generation pups produced by wolfdog mating with dogs or from the behavior of the parent animals. Thus, though the behavior of a single individual wolfdog may be predictable, the behavior of the type as a whole is not.

Due to the variability inherent to their admixture, whether a wolf–dog cross should be considered more dangerous than a dog depends on behavior specific to the individual alone rather than to wolfdogs as a group.

The view that aggressive characteristics are inherently a part of wolfdog temperament has been contested in recent years by wolfdog breeders and other advocates of wolfdogs as pets.

== In popular culture ==
- Jed was a Canadian timber wolf-Alaskan Malamute and animal actor, known for his roles in such movies as White Fang (1991), White Fang 2: Myth of the White Wolf (1994), The Journey of Natty Gann (1985), and The Thing (1982); he was born in 1977 and died in June 1995, aged 18.
- Balto, Aleu and Kodi are fictitious wolfdogs in the animated films Balto (1995), Balto II: Wolf Quest (2002) and Balto III: Wings of Change (2004), respectively. The actual Balto was not a wolfdog but instead a Siberian Husky.
- White Fang is the titular character of Jack London's eponymous 1906 novel, first serialized in Outing magazine, that details the wild wolfdog's journey to domestication in the Yukon Territory and the Northwest Territories during the 1890s Klondike Gold Rush.
- The Wolf Dog (1933) is an American Pre-Code Mascot film serial starring Frankie Darro and Rin Tin Tin Jr.
- Wolf Dog (1958), also known as A Boy and His Dog, is a Northwestern movie, directed and produced by Sam Newfield, and produced by Regal Films
- Wolfdogs Magazine self-describes as a progressive "community based publication for wolfdog enthusiasts".

== See also ==
- Black wolf
- Canid hybrid
- Coydog
- Coywolf
- Dingo-dog hybrid
- Dogxim
- Jackal–dog hybrid
- Wolves as pets and working animals
- Calupoh
