= Markiesje =

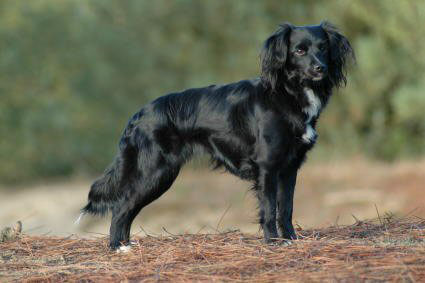
- Other names: Dutch Tulip Dog; Hollandse Tulphond
- Origin: Netherlands

A Markiesje (Dutch pronunciation: [mɑrˈkiɕə]), also known as Dutch Tulip Dog, is believed to be an old dog breed. On several paintings dating from the 17th and 18th century a small, black dog resembling a Markiesje can be seen. However, the Markiesje – as currently known – has only been bred actively since the mid 1970s.

The Markiesje was accepted by the Dutch Raad van Beheer op Kynologisch Gebied in Nederland as an official breed but it is not yet accepted by the Fédération Cynologique Internationale.

== Character ==
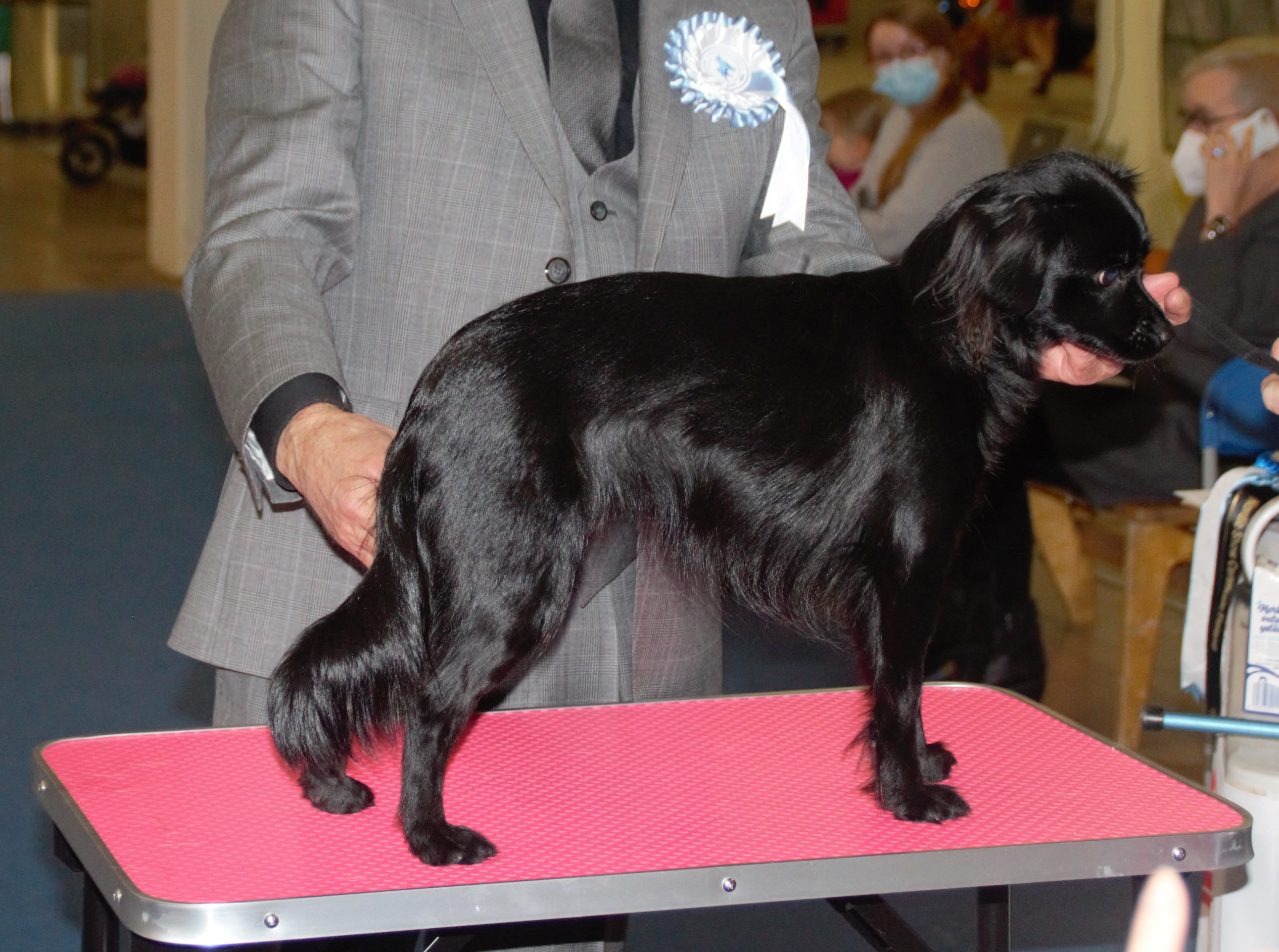
A Markiesje being examined by a judge.

The Dutch Raad van Beheer op Kynologisch Gebied in Nederland categorized Markiesje as a companion dog, not to be confused with a lap dog. The dog likes long walks and runs. Markiesjes are rather alert and will act as watchdog. The dog can be kept with other pets, such as cats and rodents, provided they are introduced properly and trained to accept each other.
