= Saarloos wolfdog =

Saarloos Wolfdog
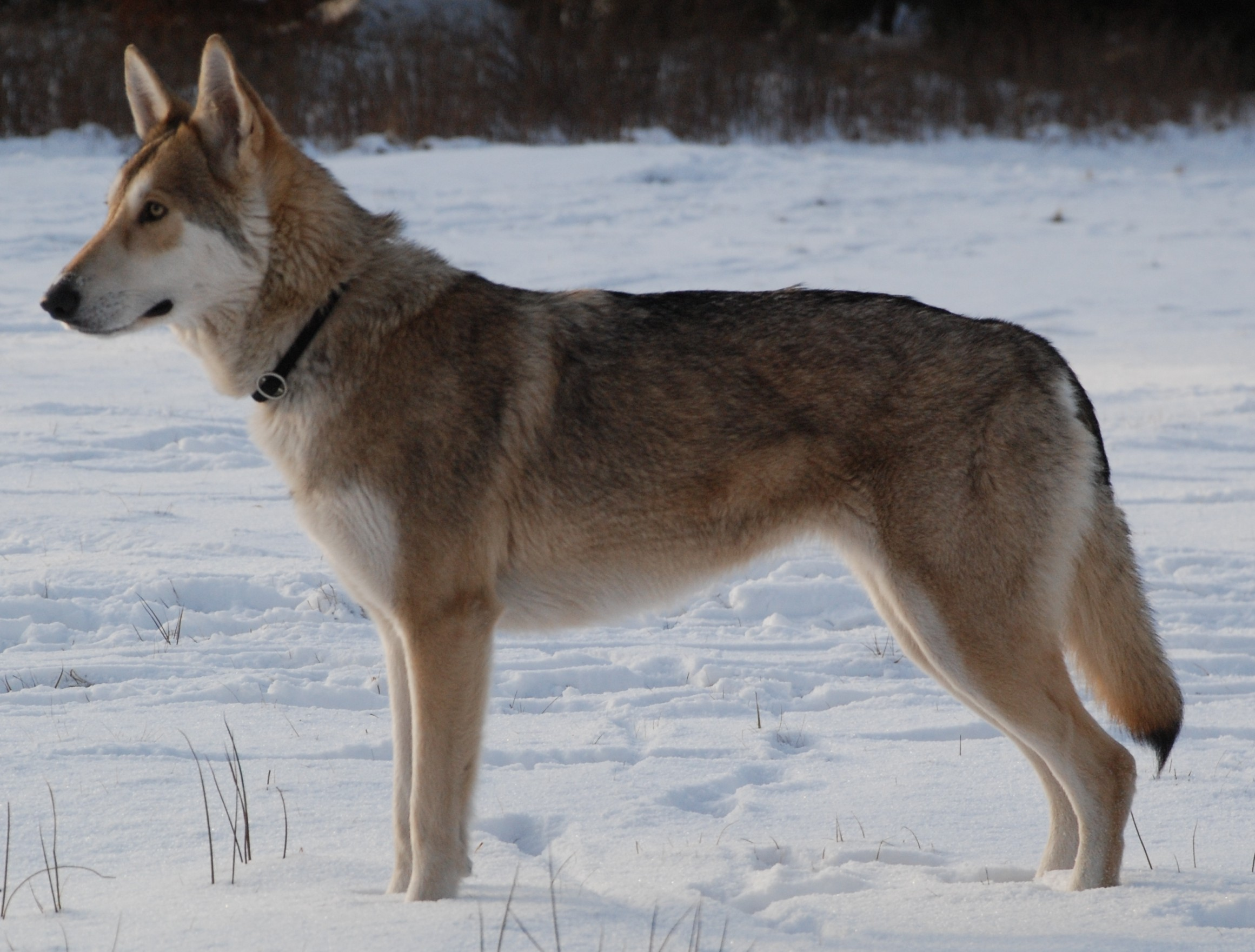
- Wolf grey female
- Other names: Dutch Wolfdog; Saarlooswolfhond
- Origin: Netherlands
Kennel club standards
- Dutch Kennel Club: standard
- Fédération Cynologique Internationale: standard

The Saarloos Wolfdog (Dutch: Saarlooswolfhond, German: Saarlooswolfhund) is a wolfdog breed originating from the Netherlands by the crossing of a German Shepherd with a Siberian grey wolf in 1935. The offspring were then further crossed with German Shepherds.

== History ==
Leendert Saarloos (1884–1969) was a Dutch zoologist and dog breeder who believed that the German Shepherd had become too domesticated and wanted to breed back the more natural properties in order to derive a better working dog. In 1935, he bred a male German Shepherd (German: Deutscher Schäferhund, Dutch: Duitse herdershond) to a female Eurasian grey wolf (Canis lupus lupus) from Siberia. He then bred the offspring back with German Shepherds to derive a dog with one quarter wolf blood. The result was a dog that was not useful as a working dog but as a companion that is close to nature. The Dutch Kennel Club recognized the breed in 1975 as "Saarlooswolfdog", after its creator. In 1981, the breed was recognized by the Fédération Cynologique Internationale (FCI). In April 2026, the Sarloos wolfdog was added to the American Kennel Club Foundation Stock Service (FSS).

=== Genetic evidence ===
In 2015, a DNA study found that the Saarlooswolfdog showed more genetic association with the grey wolf than any other breed, which is in agreement with the documented historical crossbreeding with grey wolves in this breed. In 2016, a major DNA study of domestic dogs found a deep division between the Saarlooswolfdog and all other dogs, highlighting its descent from the crossing of German Shepherds with captive wolves in the 1930s. In 2019, a genomic study found that the amount of grey wolf ancestry possessed by the Saarlooswolfdog is 18–33% and the Czechoslovakian Wolfdog 20–30%.

== Description ==
The Saarloos Wolfdog is a strongly built dog whose build, coat and movement is wolf-like. The height is between 65–75 cm (26–30 in) in males and 60–70 cm (24–28 in) in females. It weighs up to 45 kg (100 lb). It is an athletic dog in build, with medium bone, and a strong and muscular body. It moves lightly on its feet and has an elegant march. Its coat is short and dense, providing good protection from the weather. There are three colours: wolfgrey, forestbrown and white. Because the wolfgrey genes are dominant, this is the most common colour. Genes for white colour are recessive, making this uncommon although this colour is accepted. The Saarloos has wolf-like expressions, as well as a wolf-like head.

== Training ==
This breed needs thorough socialization before the twelfth week of age to ensure prosocial behavior.

== Outcross program ==
The two Dutch parent breed clubs for Saarloos wolfdogs researched possibilities to improve the breed's health by increasing genetic diversity. The first meetings with the Dutch kennel club were held in 2010. Following these meetings, Wageningen University and Research was asked to investigate the degree of interrelatedness of the population. The research was conducted by quantitative geneticist J.J. Windig and Ir M. Spies-Stoop. This study revealed that the population of Saarloos wolfdogs was very closely related. Without intervention, the degree of inbreeding would threaten the breed's survival. The scientists advised a controlled and extensive outcross program to increase the breed's vitality, fertility and genetic variation. The Dutch kennel club approved the outcross programme in 2012.

Two types of outcrosses are used in the outcross programme. The first type is the use of so-called "look-alikes", which are dogs that resemble a Saarloos wolfdog, but that don't have a pedigree, or that belong to a breed that isn't recognized by the FCI. The second type is the use of several FCI-recognized breeds. The breeds to be used are chosen by breed club members and agreed upon by majority vote. The procedure for both types of outcrosses is the same. The outcross is performed, and the F1 generation is produced. The F1 is evaluated and fully health screened, and the best individuals are chosen to contribute to the next generation. This is done by breeding them back to purebred Saarloos wolfdogs, which produces the F2 generation. The F2 is again evaluated and health tested, and the best individuals are bred back to Saarloos wolfdogs to produce the F3 generation. The offspring of an F3 with a purebred Saarloos wolfdog (F4) will get an official pedigree and be recognized as a purebred. In order to maintain proper breed type, purebred breeding of Saarloos wolfdogs must continue alongside the outcross program.

As of January 2019, the following outcrosses have been performed:

- White Swiss Shepherd (currently in the F3)
- Siberian Husky (currently in the F2)
- Ibizan Hound (currently in the F2)
- Norwegian Elkhound (currently in the F3)
- Look-alike Northern Inuit Dog (currently in the F3)

== See also ==
- List of dog breeds
- Czechoslovakian Wolfdog
