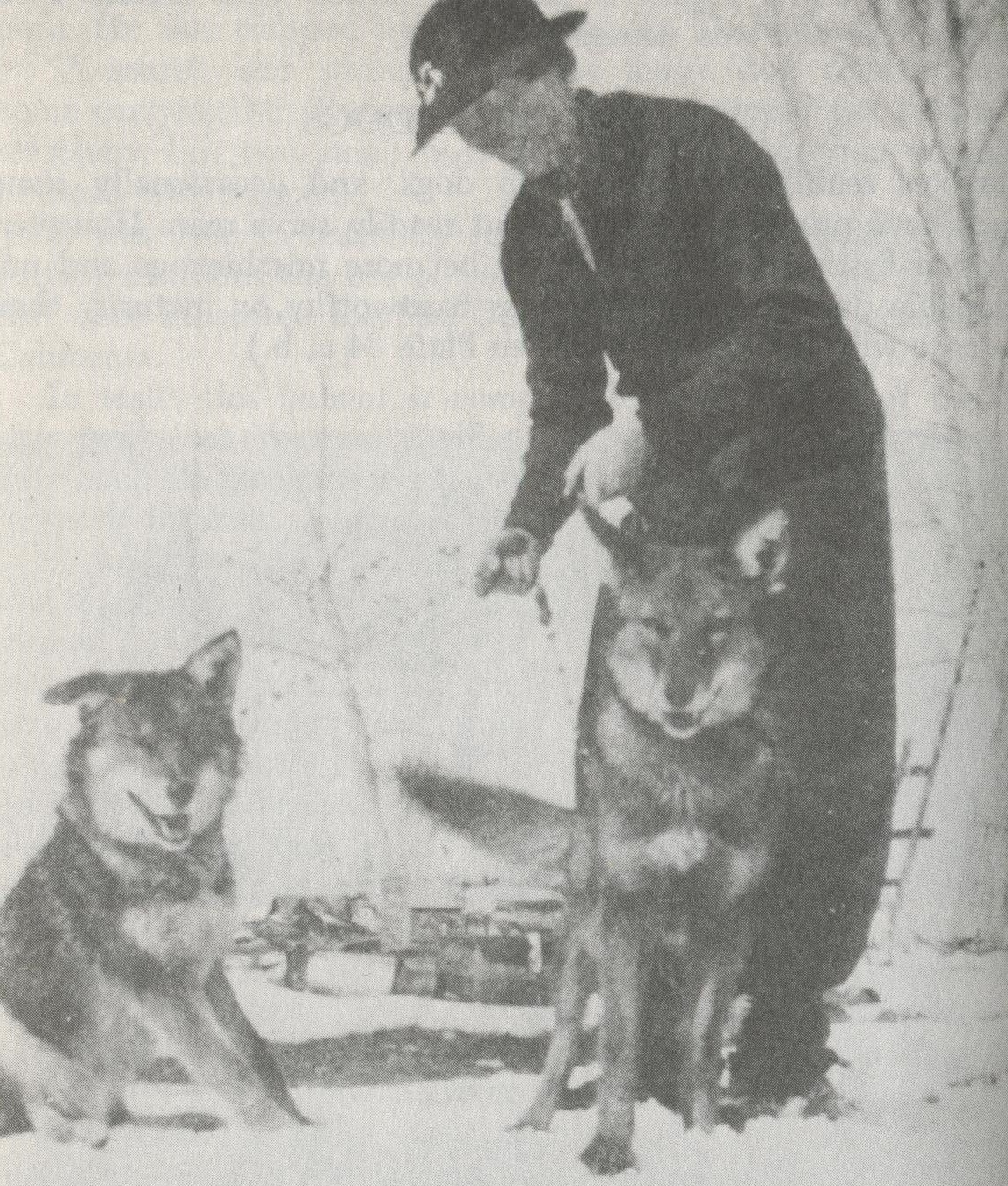
- Captive coydogs in Wyoming

Scientific classification
- Kingdom: Animalia
- Phylum: Chordata
- Class: Mammalia
- Order: Carnivora
- Family: Canidae
- Subtribe: Canina
- Genus: Canis
- Species: C. latrans × C. familiaris

= Coydog =

Coyote and dog hybrid

A coydog is a canid hybrid resulting from a mating between a male coyote and a female dog. Hybrids of both sexes are fertile and can be successfully bred through four generations. Similarly, a dogote/doyote is a hybrid with a dog father and a coyote mother.

Such matings occurred long before the European colonization of the Americas, as melanistic coyotes have been shown to have inherited their black pelts from dogs likely brought to North America through the Bering Land Bridge 12,000 to 14,000 years ago by the ancestors of the indigenous peoples of the Americas.

Coydogs were deliberately bred in Pre-Columbian Mexico, where coyotes were held in high regard. In the city of Teotihuacan, it was common practice to crossbreed coyotes and Mexican wolves with dogs in order to breed resistant, loyal but temperamental, good guardians. Northern Indigenous peoples in Canada were mating coyotes and wolves to their sled dogs in order to produce more resilient animals as late as the early 20th century.

The term is sometimes mistakenly used for coywolves, which are common in northeastern North America, whereas true coydogs are only occasionally found in the wild.

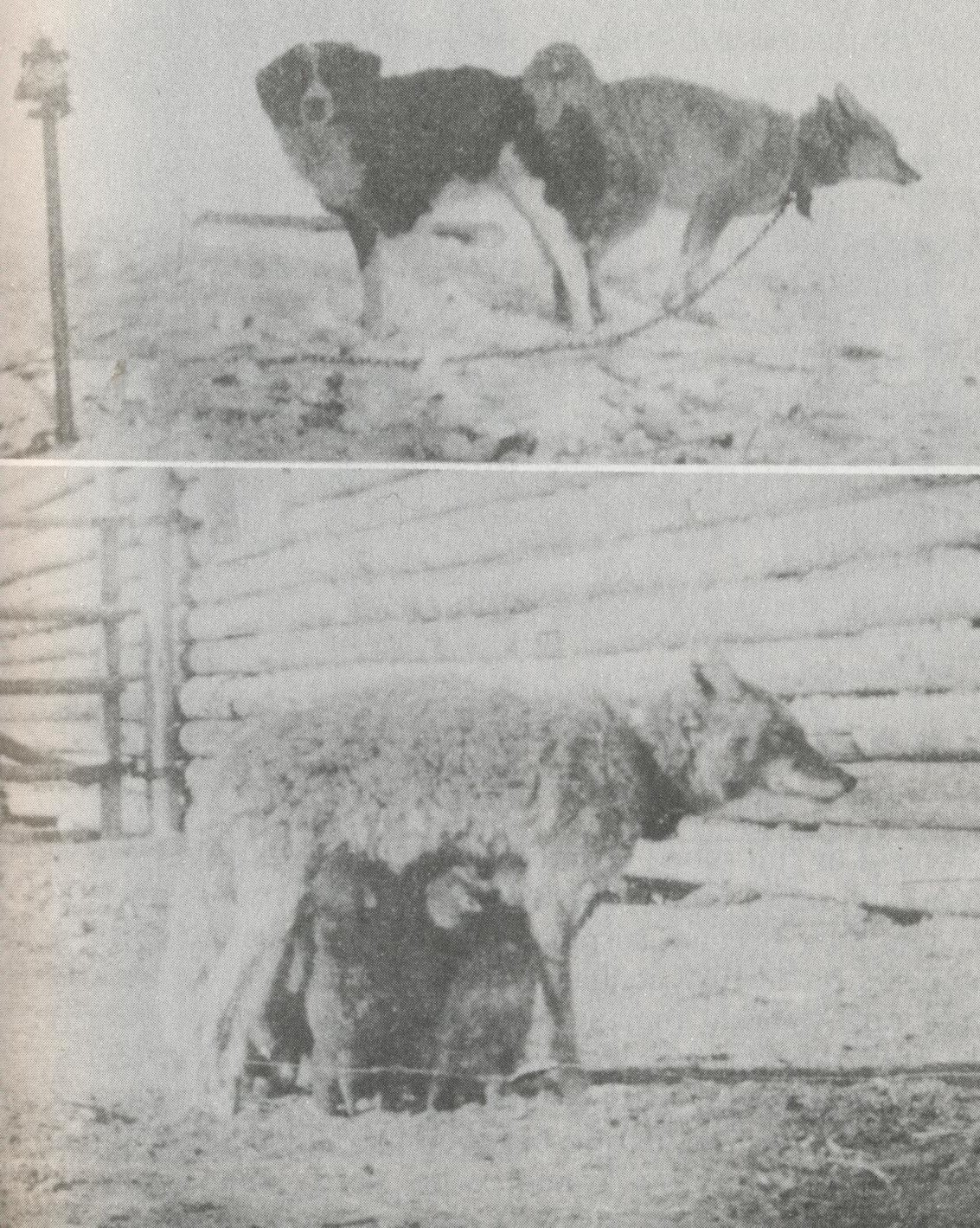
A captive female coyote mating with a male dog, then nursing the resulting hybrids ("dogotes")

In captivity, F_{1} hybrids tend to be more mischievous and less manageable as pups than dogs, and are less trustworthy in maturity than wolfdogs. Hybrids vary in appearance, but generally retain the coyote's adult coat color, dark neonatal coat color, bushy tail with an active supracaudal gland, and white facial mask. F_{1} hybrids tend to be intermediate in form between dogs and coyotes, while F_{2} hybrids are more varied. Both F_{1} and F_{2} hybrids resemble their coyote parents in terms of shyness and intrasexual aggression. Hybrid play behavior includes the coyote "hip-slam". A population of non-albino white coyotes in Newfoundland owe their coloration to a MC1R mutation inherited from Golden Retrievers.

Some 15% of 10,000 coyotes taken annually in Illinois for their coats during the early 1980s may have been coydogs based on cranial measurements. As the coyote population in Illinois at the time was estimated at 20,000–30,000, this would suggest a population of 3,000–4,500 coydogs in the state. Of 379 wild canid skulls taken in Ohio from 1982 to 1988, 10 (2.6%) were found to be coydogs. It was noted that "The incidence of coydog hybrids was high only in areas of expanding, widely dispersed coyote populations". In a study of coyote–dog encounters in the wild, hostile and playful encounters were seen in about equal proportions.

== See also ==
- List of dog breeds
- Canid hybrid
- Coywolf
- Dingo–dog hybrid
- Dogxim
- Jackal–dog hybrid
- Sulimov dog
- Wolfdog
