= Czechoslovakian Wolfdog =

Czech and Slovak breed of dog

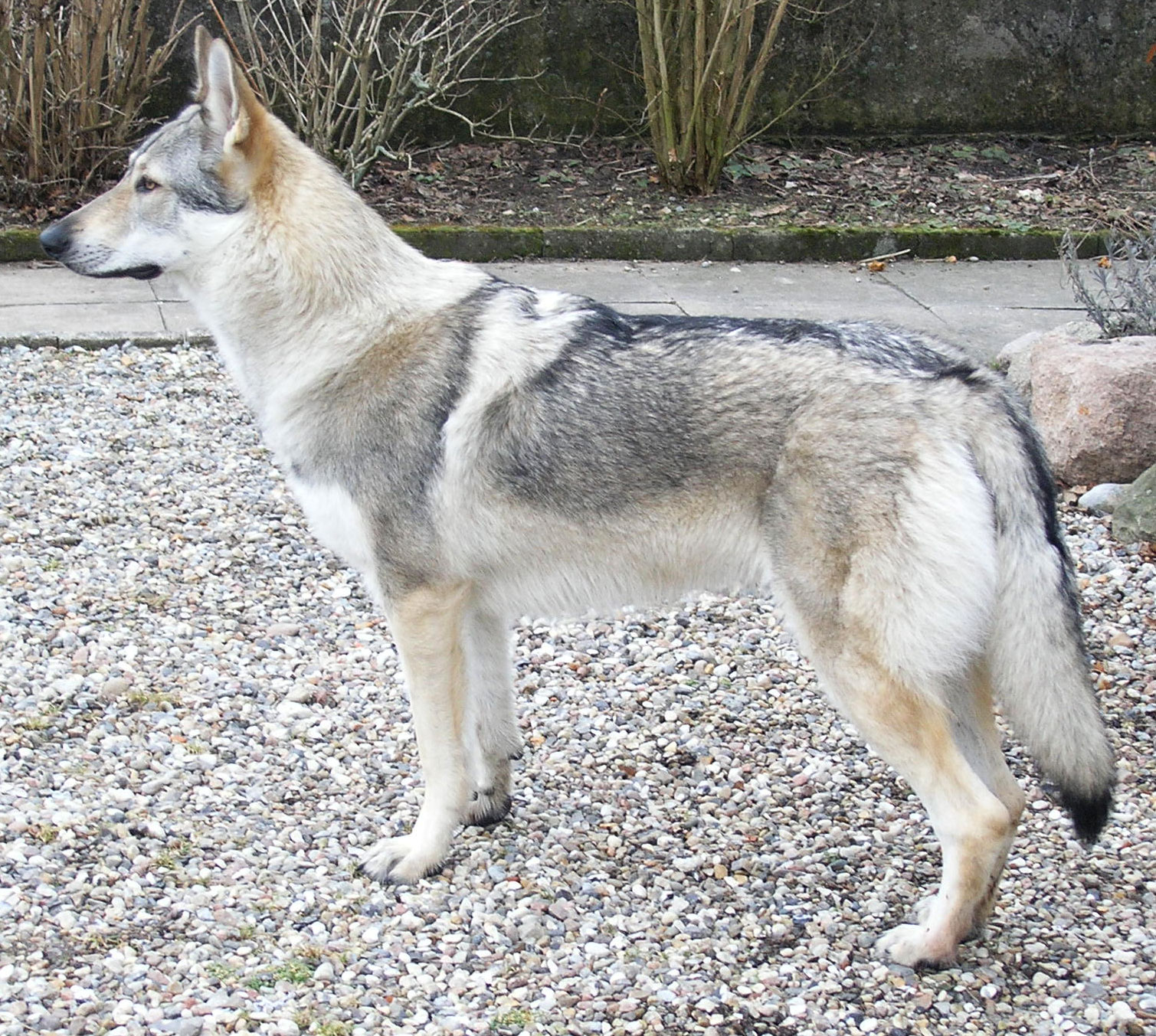

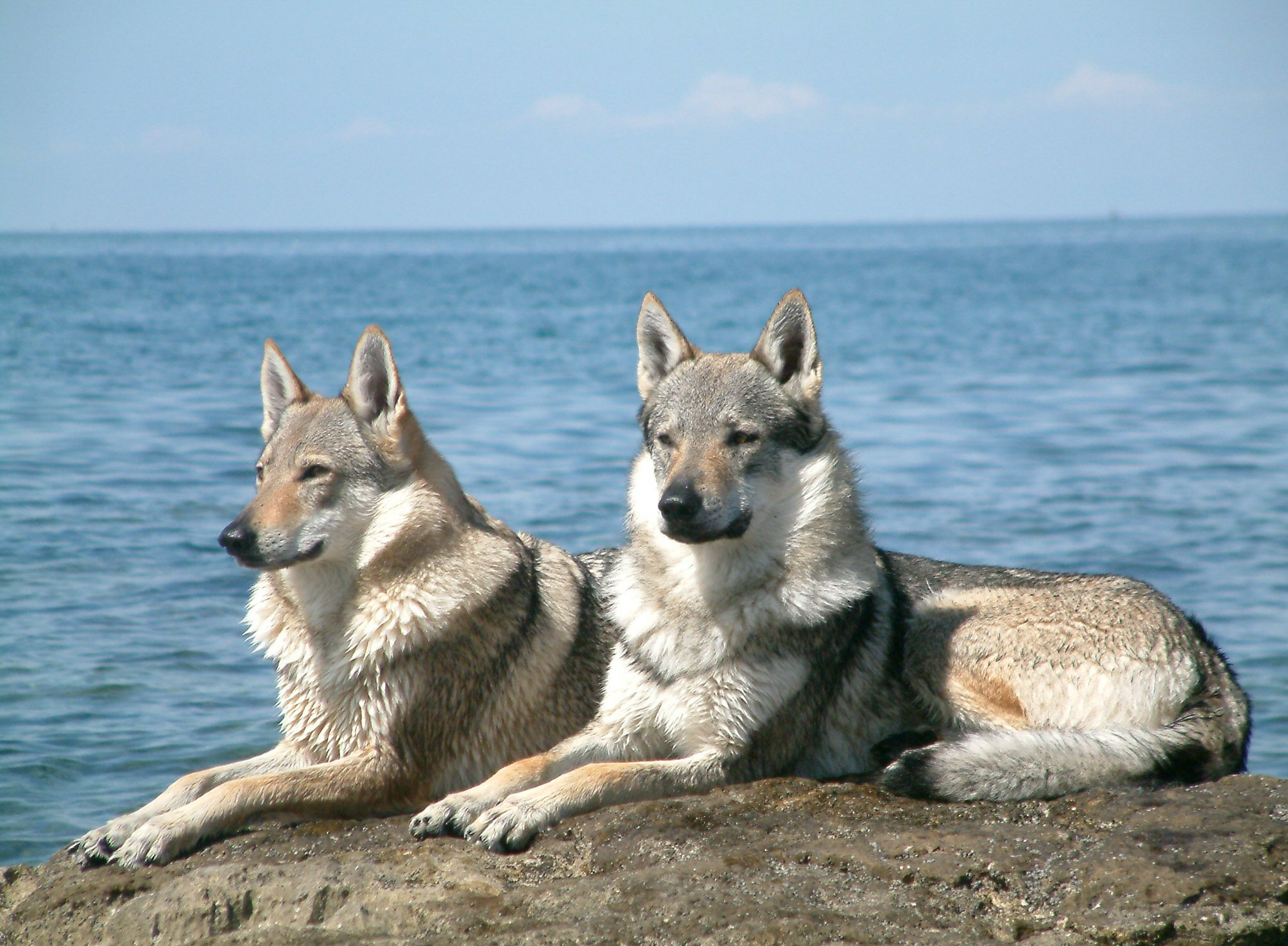
- Other names: Czechoslovakian Vlciak
- Origin: Czech Republic; Slovakia
Traits
Height	Males	65 cm (26 in)
	Females	60 cm (24 in)
Weight	Males	minimum 26 kg (55 lb)
	Females	minimum 20 kg (45 lb)
- Coat: straight and close
- Colour: yellowish-grey to silver-grey with a light mask
Kennel club standards
- Fédération Cynologique Internationale: standard

The Czechoslovakian Wolfdog (Czech: československý vlčák, Slovak: československý vlčiak, German: Tschechoslowakischer Wolfhund) is a breed of wolfdog that began as an experiment conducted in Czechoslovakia in 1955 by colonel Karel Hartl together with cynologist Heiri Machat. The breed was known as Czech Wolfdog (Czech: český vlčák, Slovak: český vlčiak) until 1982.

It was officially recognized as a national breed in Czechoslovakia in 1982, and was definitively accepted by the Fédération Cynologique Internationale in 1999.

== History ==
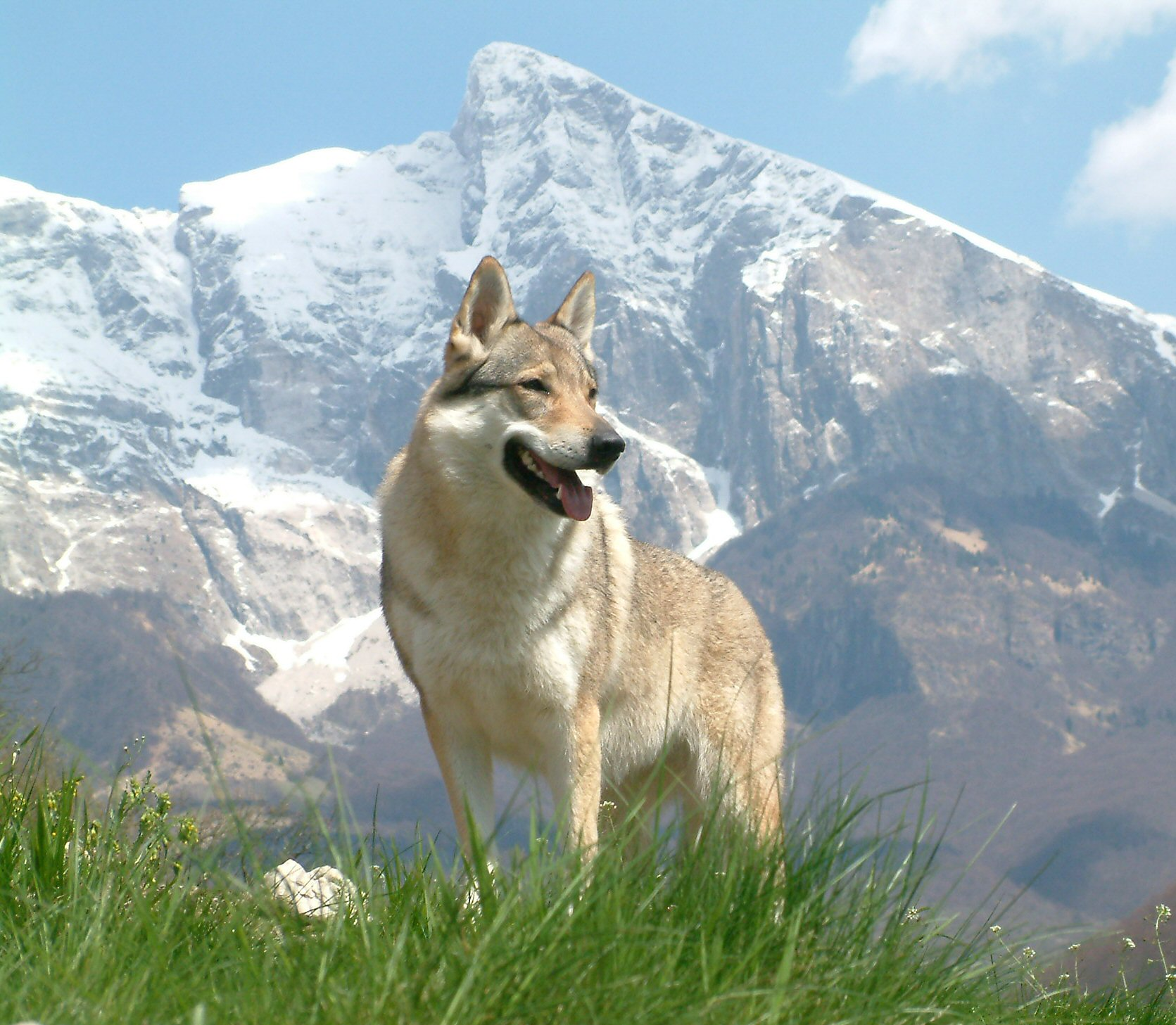
In the Alps

In 1955, Karel Hartl began to consider crossing a Carpathian grey wolf with a German Shepherd as a scientific experiment in the military kennels in Czechoslovakia. The first hybrids of a female wolf named Brita and a male sable German Shepherd named Cézar z Březového háje were born on 26 May 1958 in Libějovice, Czechoslovakia (modern-day Czech Republic).

The Ceskoslovenský Vlciak was definitely accepted by the Fédération Cynologique Internationale in 1999, listed in its Sheepdogs and Cattledogs group of breeds.

In 2012, the breed numbered 168 bitches and 170 dogs officially registered in the Czech Republic.

In 2015, a DNA study of the breed compared to German Shepherds and Carpathian wolves found only two maternal mitochondrial DNA haplotypes and two paternal Y DNA haplotypes within the breed. Both mDNA haplotypes and one yDNA haplotype originated with German Shepherd Dogs and were the result of back-crossing. The other yDNA haplotype was unique to the breed. All four haplotypes were distinct from those of the parental populations. The results indicate limited introgression of lupine alleles (genetic expressions) within a higher proportion of the canine genome, which is consistent with the backcrossing used in the breed.

The American Kennel Club published a breed standard in 2024.

== Characteristics ==
Minimum height at the withers is 65 cm for dogs and 60 cm for females, and minimum body weights are 26 kg and 20 kg respectively.

The coat is straight, close-fitting, and very thick in the winter months of the year, but thinner in summer. The coat colour varies from silver-grey to yellow-grey, always with a light mask and light hair on the chest and under the neck; it may also be dark grey, still with a light mask.

== Use ==
Some of the dogs have been used in search-and-rescue work in the United Kingdom.

== See also ==
- Saarloos Wolfdog
