= Jackal–dog hybrid =

Canid hybrid resulting from a mating between a dog and a golden jackal

A jackal–dog hybrid is a canid hybrid resulting from a mating between a domestic dog and a golden jackal. Such crossbreeding has occurred numerous times in captivity and was first confirmed to occasionally happen in the wild in Croatia in 2015.

== Possible constraints ==
The golden jackal (Canis aureas) is a member of the same genus, Canis, as wolves, coyotes, and domestic dogs; all of the latter three are known to hybridize naturally.

It is conjectured that the domestic dog and other Canis species cannot hybridise with the two other species that are called "jackals" which are both in the separate Lupulella genus: the side-striped jackal (Lupulella adusta), and the black-backed jackal (Lupulella mesomelas).

Similar matings between golden jackals and grey wolves have never been directly observed, though evidence of such occurrences was discovered through mtDNA analysis of golden jackals in Bulgaria. Although no genetic evidence has been found of grey wolf–jackal hybridization in the Caucasus Mountains, some cases exist where apparently genetically pure golden jackals have displayed remarkably grey wolf-like phenotypes, to the point of being mistaken for wolves by trained biologists.

== History ==
British surgeon and amateur naturalist John Hunter was the first to write an account of the two species' interfertility in 1787. He described how a ship captain of the East India Company adopted a female jackal and had it mated to his spaniel, after which it whelped six pups upon arriving in England. Hunter purchased one of the female hybrid pups and attempted to mate it with several dogs upon reaching maturity. Further crossbreeding experiments were initially hampered by the hybrid female's apparent lack of interest in the dogs brought to it, though it subsequently mated with a terrier and produced five pups.

Marie Jean Pierre Flourens attempted his own crossbreeding experiments nearly a century later, noting that first-generation matings between the two species tended to produce animals in which jackal characteristics were dominant, having straight ears, hanging tails, lack of barking, and wild temperaments. A similar observation was made by Robert Armitage Sterndale, who recorded a jackal-dog crossbreeding experiment spanning several generations in British India, noting that glaring jackal traits could be exhibited in hybrids even after three generations of crossing them with dogs. Flourens, however, observed that his jackal hybrids became sterile after the fourth generation, but could be mated back to either parent species.

Charles Darwin wrote of a first-generation hybrid kept in the London Zoo which was completely sterile, though he noted that this was an exceptional case, as first-generation hybrids have been known to reproduce successfully. He criticized Flourens's earlier experiments, noting that the specimens he used were all closely related; thus, their subsequent sterility would have been explainable as a result of inbreeding.

Breeding experiments in Germany with poodles and jackals and later on with the resulting dog–jackal hybrids showed a decrease in fertility and significant communication problems, as well as an increase of genetic diseases after three generations of interbreeding between the hybrids, unlike with wolfdogs, which remain healthy and never become sterile. These "puchas" (poodle-jackals), like the "pucos" (poodle coyotes), exhibited much less domestic dog-like behaviour than the wolf-hybrids.

In 2015, hybridization between golden jackals and domestic dogs in the wild was confirmed when three specimens with anomalous traits were killed in Croatia and had their genetic markers analyzed. Two of the specimens, a light-colored female and a melanistic male, were very jackal-like in appearance, save for their coloration and rounded ears, while one was much more doglike, lacking the jackal's conjoined middle paw pads and sporting dewclaws and a white coat with brown patches. This last specimen was thought to be the pup of the female, which had likely backcrossed with a stray Istrian Shorthaired Hound. The black hybrid was revealed to be a backcross to jackal.

== Sulimov dog ==
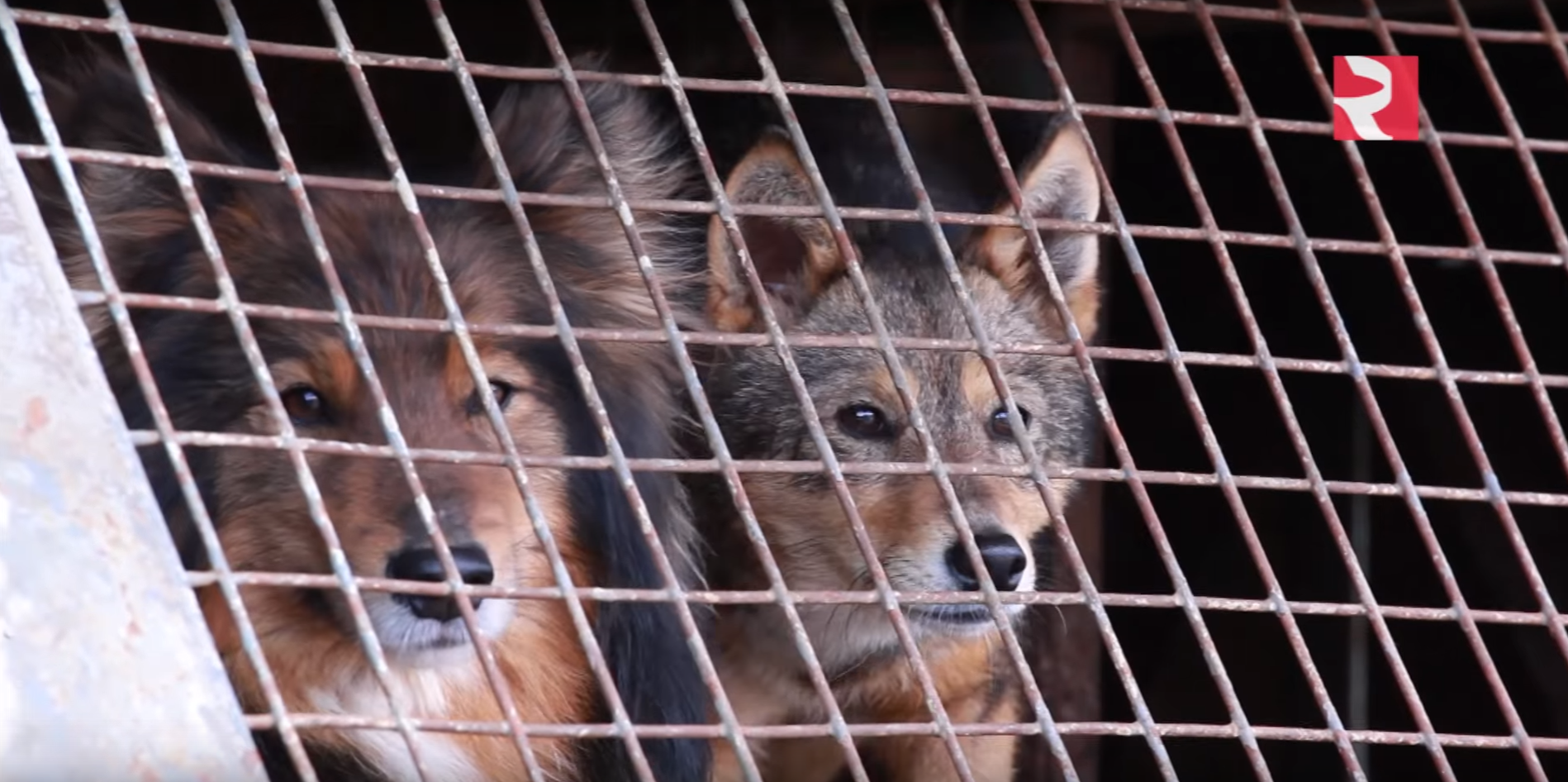
Sulimov dogs

The Sulimov dog originated in Russia from an initial hybrid between Nenets Herding Laika and golden jackals to produce one-quarter jackal hybrids. The hybrid was developed by Klim Sulimov. (Note: Klim Sulimov (1931-2021) was a senior research assistant at the D.S. Likhachev Scientific Research Institute for Cultural Heritage and Environmental Protection.) The resulting breed was thought to have the jackal's power of scent and the husky's resistance to cold. During recent years, Aeroflot has used them for airport security as detection dogs to sniff out explosives otherwise undetectable by machinery.

Sulimov's breeding program dates back to 1975, but was not applied to bomb detection until 2002. At the start of the breeding process, male jackal pups had to be fostered on a Lapponian Herder bitch to imprint the jackals on dogs. Female jackals accepted male dogs more easily. The half-breed jackal-dogs were hard to train and were bred back to Huskies to produce quarter-bred hybrids (quadroons). To improve trainability, other dogs were bred into the line: A Nenets Herding Laika, a Fox Terrier, and a Spitz. These hybrids were small, agile, and trainable, and had excellent noses. The jackal–dog hybrids were bred together for seven generations to establish the breed. The result was an easily trainable dog with a superior sense of smell, called "Sulimov dogs" after their breeder.

As described by Sulimov:

My dogs combine the qualities of Arctic reindeer herding dogs, which can work in temperatures as low as −70°C, and jackals which enjoy the heat up to +40°C. They're perfect for our country."

Aeroflot used 25 Sulimov dogs at Sheremetyevo Airport, Moscow, for functions which include bomb-sniffing. They may one day be registered as a breed of working dog, but at present only about 40 Sulimov dogs exist, and all are the property of Aeroflot. They are trained from puppyhood to recognize 12 components of explosives. Unlike more common sniffing dogs, they take the initiative in searching.

== See also ==
- Canid hybrid
- Coydog
