= Dutch Kennel Club =

Official kennel club of the Netherlands

- Raad van Beheer
- Formation: 1902; 124 years ago
- Type: Kennel club
- Headquarters: Emmalaan, Amsterdam
- Region served: The Netherlands
- Members: 150,000
- Official language: Dutch
- Website: www.houdenvanhonden.nl

Raad van Beheer op Kynologisch Gebied in Nederland (English: Dutch Kennel Club (DKC)) is the official kennel club of the Netherlands. Founded in 1902, it currently represents around 200 breed clubs with 150,000 members, and is a member of the Fédération Cynologique Internationale (FCI).

== History ==
The first dog shows in the Netherlands were organised by the Dutch Society of Agriculture, the first show taking place in 1892 in Rotterdam with an entry of 217 dogs. Later shows and field trials were also run by the Nimrod hunters' society, Cynophilia, and the Kynologenvereniging Nederland ("Canine Society of the Netherlands").

In 1902 it was decided to set up a new organisation, the Raad van Beheer op Kynologisch Gebied in Nederland, to consolidate the dog registration and pedigree systems, and regulate showing and field trials. A studbook was set up named the Nederlands Honden Stamboek (N.H.S.B., "Dutch Dog Studbook"). A number of pre-existing breed clubs and local groups applied to the new kennel club for recognition.

The Raad van Beheer joined the Fédération Cynologique Internationale (FCI) at its inaugural meeting in Paris, 1911, and hosted its first conference in Amsterdam in 1912.

At the beginning of the year 2000, the Raad van Beheer abandoned the structure of a society with an elected board of directors, in favour of a union of breed clubs and local groups.

== Kennel club membership ==
As of 2013, there are roughly 200 breed clubs, 70 local groups, 10 "special" clubs (including the Dutch Judges' Society) and 12 sighthound clubs. Approximately 500,000, or 1 in 3 dogs in the Netherlands, are registered with the DKC; 42,000 new-born puppies were registered in the studbook in the year 2012, with 260 breeds registered annually. In total, 330 breeds are recognised.

== Native breeds ==
One of the primary aims of the Dutch Kennel Club is to promote the 9 native dutch breeds:

- Dutch Shepherd (Hollandse Herdershond)
- Schapendoes (Nederlandse Schapendoes)
- Saarloos Wolfhound (Saarlooswolfhond)
- Dutch Smoushond (Hollandse Smoushond)
- Dutch partridge dog (Drentsche Patrijshond)
- Kooikerhondje (Nederlandse Kooikerhondje)
- Stabijhoun
- Wetterhoun
- Dutch Tulip Hound (Markiesje)

== Breeding regulations ==
Since reorganisation, the Dutch Kennel Club has introduced strict measures in an attempt to reduce hereditary diseases in purebred dogs. These efforts have been informed by DNA testing - it is now a requirement for registration that a DNA sample is presented. Following inspection, health certificates are issued to dogs in order to aid in determining suitability for breeding.

== See also ==
- Fédération Cynologique Internationale
- List of kennel clubs
