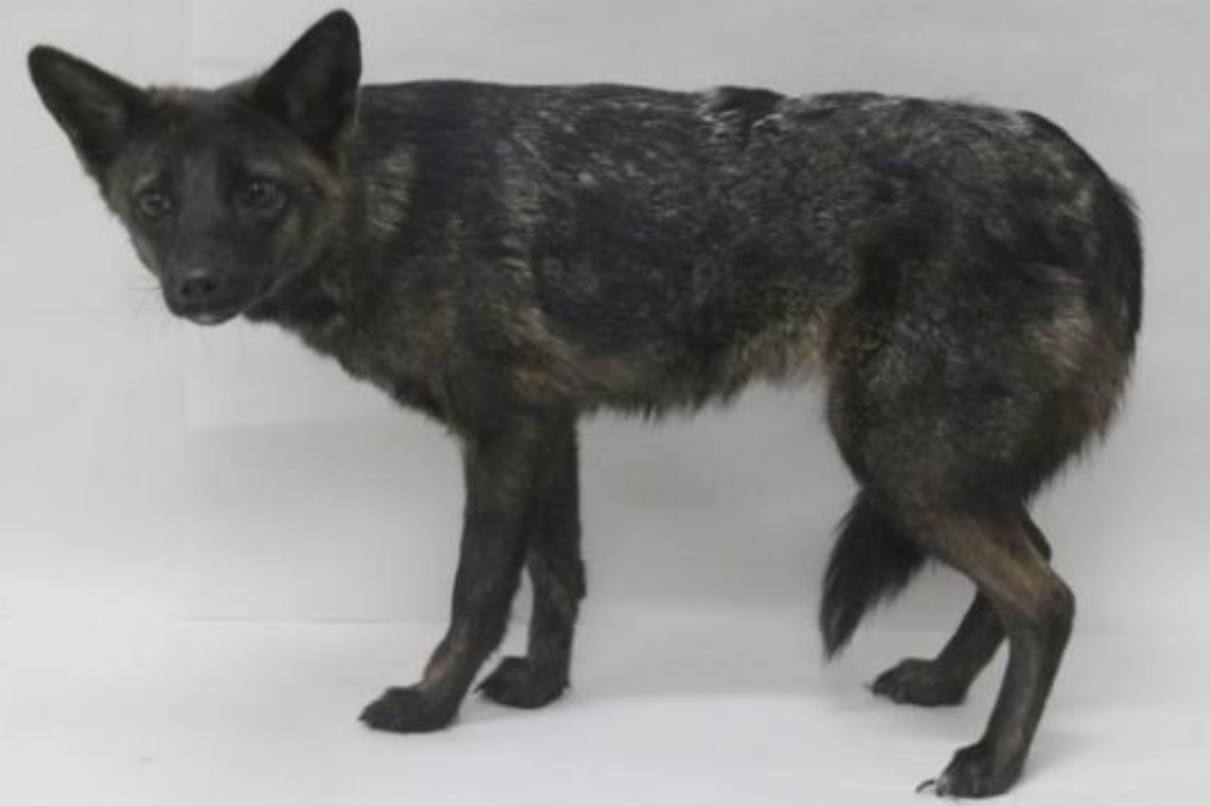
- Graxorra (Portuguese)

Scientific classification
- Kingdom: Animalia
- Phylum: Chordata
- Class: Mammalia
- Order: Carnivora
- Family: Canidae
- Subfamily: Caninae
- Tribe: Canini
- Hybrid: Lycalopex gymnocercus × Canis familiaris

= Dogxim =

Canid hybrid between a Pampas fox and a domesticated dog

Dogxim, or Graxorra in Portuguese, was a female canid hybrid between a Pampas fox and a domesticated dog that was discovered in Brazil in 2021. A team of geneticists announced in 2023 that she was a distinct hybrid genetically that "represents the first documented case of hybridization between these two species".

The canid showed a mixture of fox and dog behaviours. She was popularized as the first "fox"–dog hybrid documented in the world. However, the Pampas fox and other South American foxes are not true foxes, but genetically related to wolf-like canids, such as dogs, with which they shared a common ancestor around 6-7.4 million years ago.

Dogxim was kept at the animal care centre Mantenedouro São Braz. However, when the scientists requested fresh photographs of the canid in September 2023, the caretakers reported that she had died six months prior to the request. The Brazilian government then issued an investigation into the cause of death.

== Discovery ==
Dogxim was run over by an automobile in Vacaria, Rio Grande do Sul in 2021. She was found by the Environmental Patrol who took her to the veterinary hospital of the Federal University of Rio Grande do Sul. After medical treatment for her injuries, she was moved to the university's Center for Conservation and Rehabilitation of Wild Animals for full recovery. Scientists recollected that in 2019 biologist Herbert Hasse Junior had observed two strange canids in the same region and they speculated that Dogxim might be one of the two.

The size of Dogxim was approximately that of a medium-sized dog. Her eyes were dark brown and her body was dark brown with specks of white and grey, and had wiry hairs. By November 2021, she was transferred to Mantenedouro São Braz, an animal care centre in Santa Maria. The caretakers there noticed unusual characteristics and features in the canid that are a mixture those of wild canids and dogs. The ultimate give away came after full recovery when she showed preference for climbing in bushes to ground roaming. The veterinarian and conservationist, Flávia Ferrari, realised the need for biological assessment for which geneticists Thales Renato Ochotorena de Freitas, of the Federal University of Rio Grande do Sul, and Rafael Kretschmer, of the Federal University of Pelotas, were consulted. The genetic study established the canid as a hybrid individual, which was reported in the journal Animals on 3 August 2023.

=== Name ===
The name Dogxim is derived from dog and graxaim-do-campo, a Portuguese name for the Pampas fox. She also was given a Portuguese name, graxorra, combining the prefix for the Pampas fox and the suffix taken from cachorra that means female dog.

== Behaviour ==
Dogxim possessed a mixture of wild canid features and dog features. She had noticeably large pointed ears resembling that of foxes. She refused to eat dog food, but savoured rats. The pupils of her eyes resembled those of dogs and she barked exactly like dogs do. She did not show the behavior of a domestic dog, but neither did she show the aggression generally displayed by wild canids, acting more shy and introverted than violent. She easily adapted to human environment during her hospitalisation. She was sterilized during her medical care and while it had been stated ‘scientists believed that she had been capable of reproduction’, the source of this claim, ITV news, did not cite this comment and so it may be untrue as many hybrids are sterile.

== Identification ==
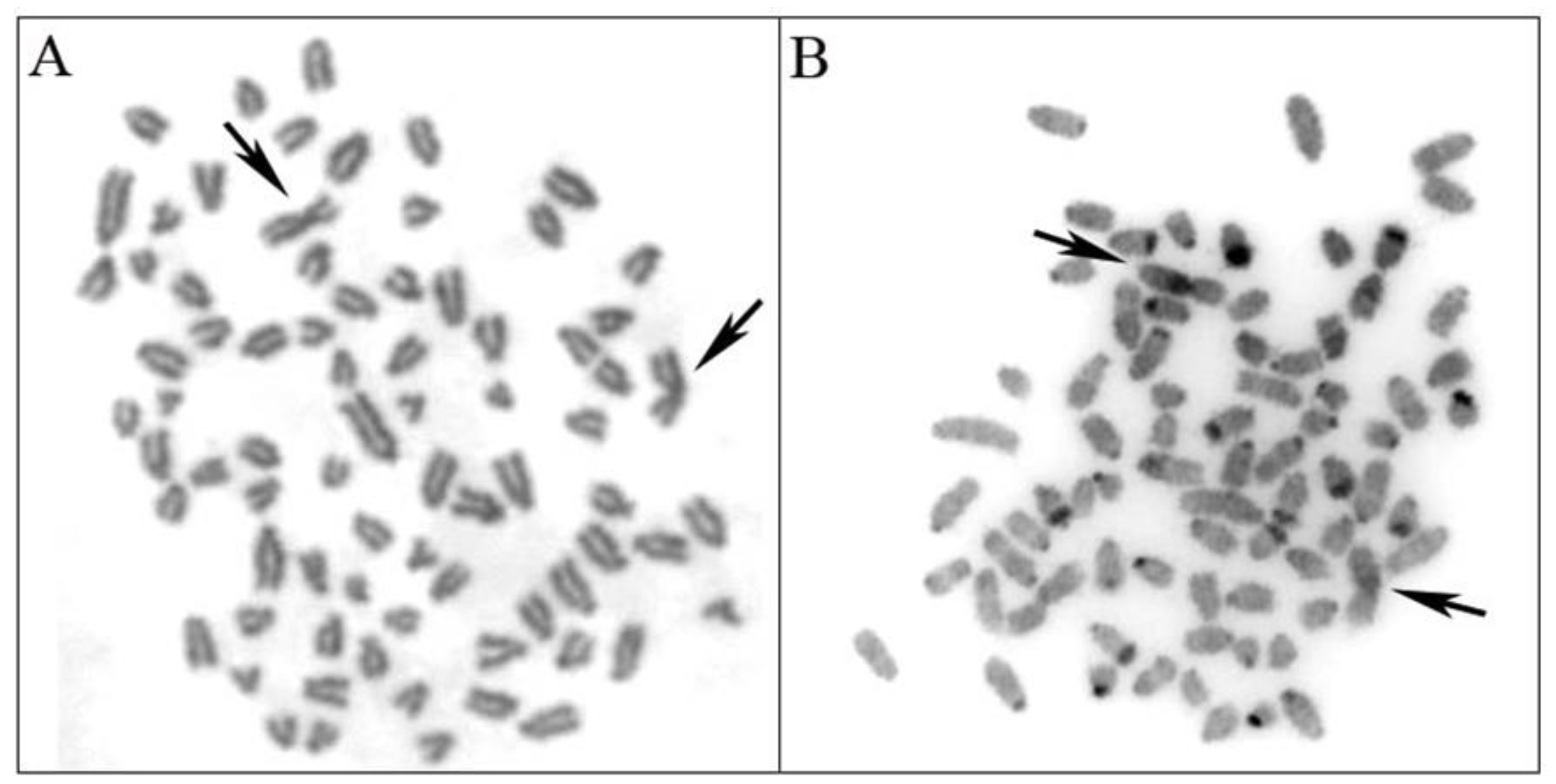
Giemsa-stained (A) and C-banded (B) metaphase in Dogxim showing 76 chromosomes, arrows indicate the X chromosomes

Four species of wild canids are known in southern Brazil: the bush dog (Speothos venaticus), the maned wolf (Chrysocyon brachyurus), the crab-eating fox (Cerdocyon thous), and the Pampas fox (Lycalopex gymnocercus). It was thought that Dogxim could not have come from the bush dog as that species is not present in the Vacaria region where she was found. The largest canid in southern Brazil is the maned wolf, but Dogxim had no particular resemblance to that species. Dogxim did have common features with both the crab-eating fox and the Pampas fox, but precise identification would require genetic analysis.

=== Genetics ===
Genetic analysis indicated that Dogxim had 76 chromosomes, which exactly matches the number in the maned wolf. However, as the chromosomes lacked the common structural appearances (phenotype) of that species, it appeared likely that the two canids were not related. It was found that Dogxim's 76 chromosomes came from the haploid chromosomes, 39 from the dog and 37 from the Pampas fox, the first evidence of hybridization between these two different canid species. Dogs have 78 chromosomes (39 haploid pairs), while the Pampas fox, 74 (37 haploid pairs). Additional evidence of hybridisation was the presence of two different X chromosomes indicating their origins from two species.

In mammals such as dogs and humans, mitochondria are inherited exclusively from the mothers. Mitochondrial DNA (mtDNA) of Dogxim indicated that her mitochondria came from the Pampas fox. Thus, Dogxim came from a crossbreeding between a Pampas fox mother and a dog father of an unknown breed. The scientists who made the original research remarked that Dogxim "represents the first documented case of hybridization between these two species". However, the Pampas fox and other South American foxes are not true foxes; instead, they are closer genetically to wolf-like canids, which include dogs. The lineage that led to the dog separated from the lineage that led to the pampas fox between 6-7.4 million years ago.

== Death ==
In August 2023, Scientists asked the caretakers at Mantenedouro São Braz for fresh pictures of Dogxim. The caretakers replied that she had died six months prior to the request. The time and nature of her death were never reported. Veterinarian and conservationist Ferrari recalled that the canid had "no indications of any health problems" after her recovery. Six months after the injury, she had been noted as completely healed. The Brazilian government issued concerns on the cause of death. The Secretariat of Environment and Infrastructure (SEMA) is conducting the investigation.

== See also ==
- List of individual dogs
