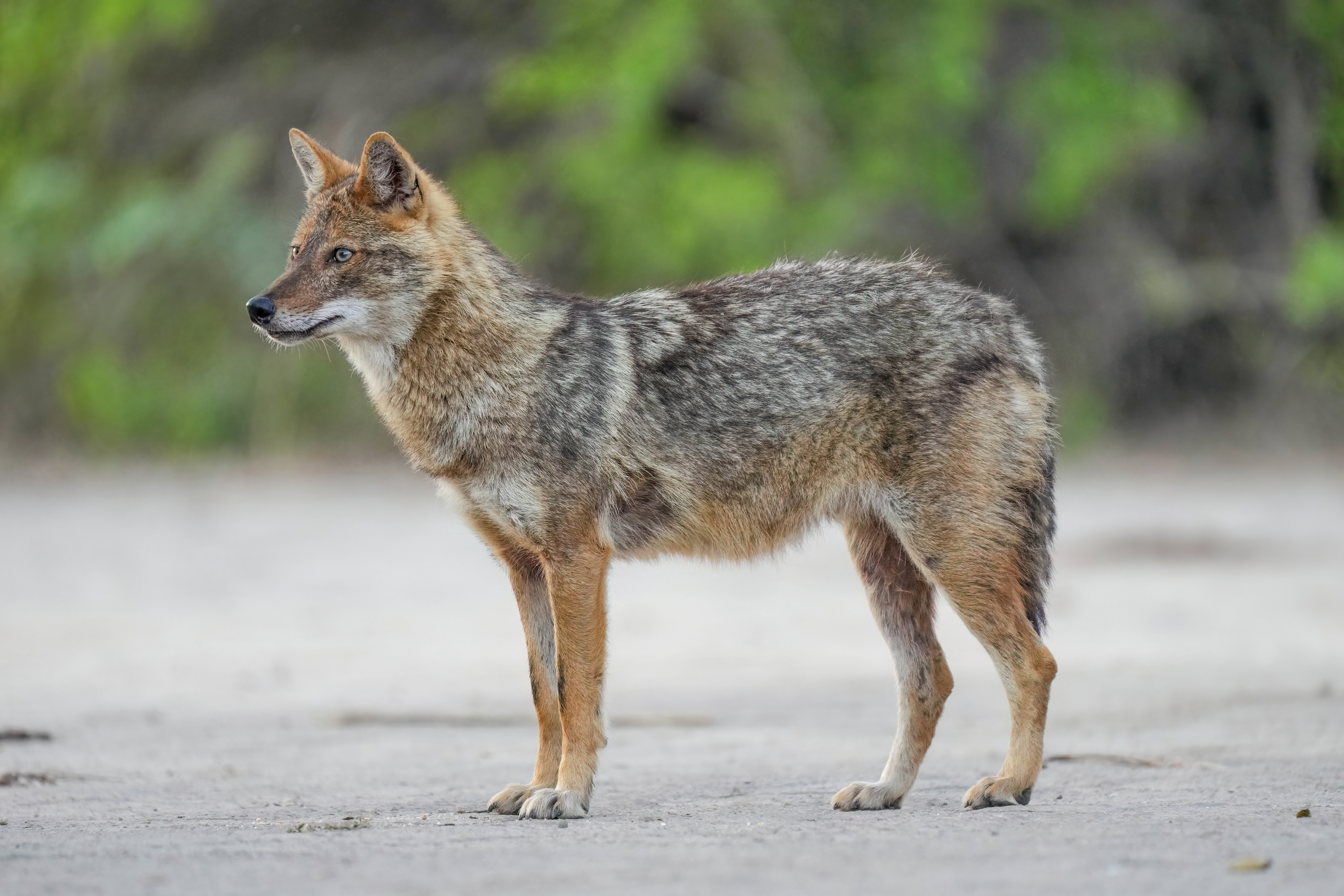
- Golden jackal in Keoladeo National Park, India
- Golden jackals howling

Conservation status
- Least Concern (IUCN 3.1)
- CITES Appendix III

Scientific classification
- Kingdom: Animalia
- Phylum: Chordata
- Class: Mammalia
- Order: Carnivora
- Family: Canidae
- Genus: Canis
- Species: C. aureus

Binomial name
- Canis aureus Linnaeus, 1758

Subspecies
- C. a. aureus; C. a. cruesemanni; C. a. indicus; C. a. moreoticus; C. a. naria; C. a. syriacus
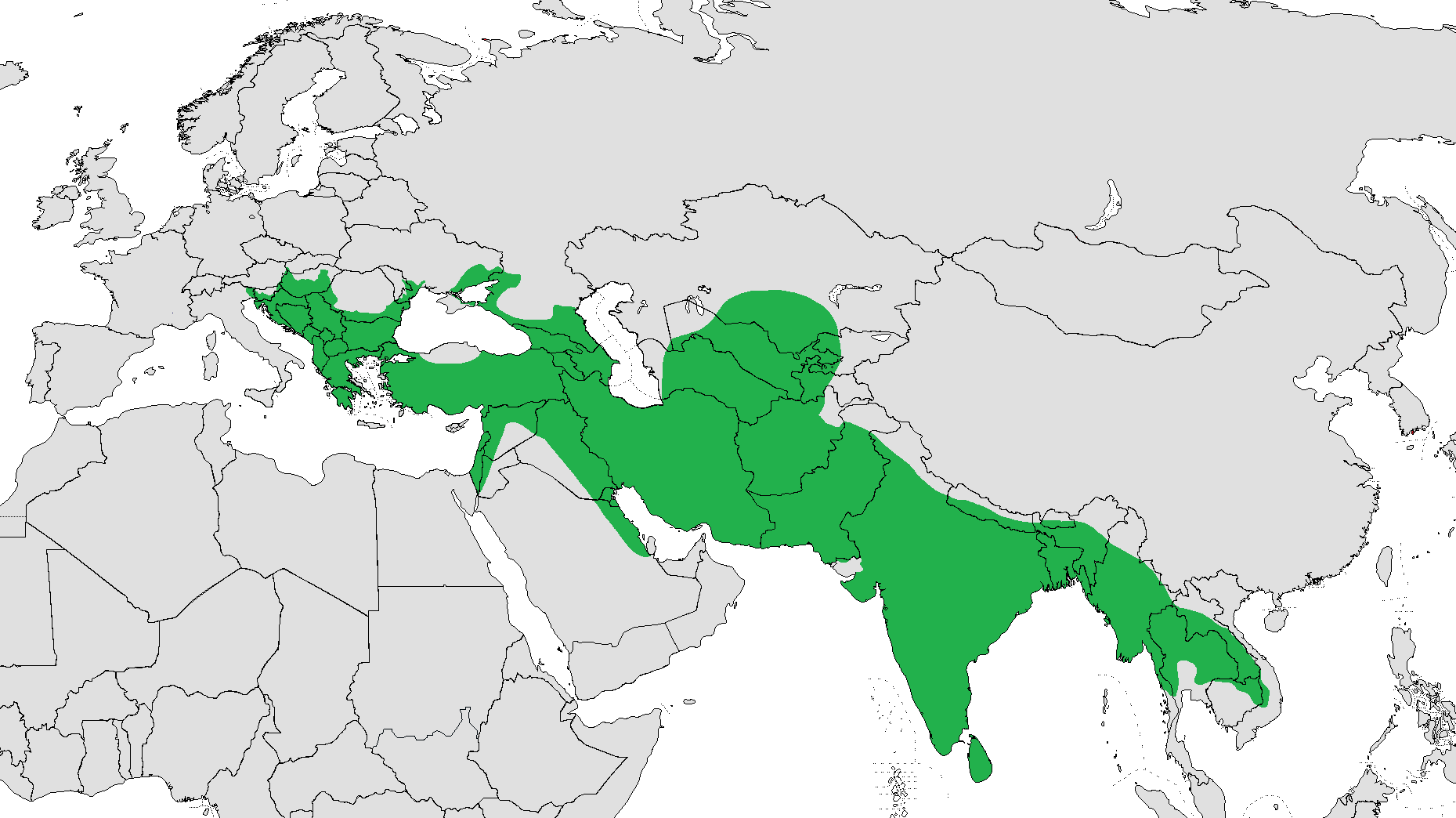
- Global golden jackal range based on IUCN's 2018 assessment.

= Golden jackal =

Golden jackal Temporal range: Late Pleistocene — present

Species of mammal

The golden jackal (Canis aureus), also called the common jackal, is a wolf-like canid that is native to Eurasia. The golden jackal's coat varies in color from a pale creamy yellow in summer to a dark tawny beige in winter. It is smaller and has shorter legs, a shorter tail, a more elongated torso, a less-prominent forehead, and a narrower and more pointed muzzle than the Arabian wolf. It is listed as Least Concern on the IUCN Red List due to its widespread distribution and high density in areas with plenty of available food and optimum shelter.

Despite its name, the golden jackal is not closely related to the African black-backed jackal or the side-striped jackal, which are part of the genus Lupulella. It is instead closer to wolves and coyotes. The ancestor of the golden jackal is believed to be the extinct Arno river dog that lived in southern Europe 1.9 million years ago. It is described as having been a small, jackal-like canine. Genetic studies indicate that the golden jackal expanded from India around 20,000 years ago, towards the end of the last Last Glacial Maximum. The oldest golden jackal fossil, found at the Ksar Akil rock shelter near Beirut, Lebanon, is 7,600 years old. The oldest golden jackal fossils in Europe were found in Greece and are 7,000 years old. There are six subspecies of the golden jackal. It is capable of producing fertile hybrids with both the gray wolf and the African wolf. Jackal–dog hybrids called Sulimov dogs are in service at the Sheremetyevo Airport near Moscow, where they are deployed by the Russian airline Aeroflot for scent-detection.

The golden jackal is abundant in valleys and beside rivers and their tributaries, canals, lakes, and seashores; however, the species is rare in foothills and low mountains. It is a social species, the basic social unit of which consists of a breeding pair and any young offspring. It is very adaptable, with the ability to exploit food ranging from fruit and insects to small ungulates. It attacks domestic fowl and domestic mammals up to the size of domestic water buffalo calves. Its competitors are the red fox, steppe wolf, jungle cat, Caucasian wildcat, the raccoon in the Caucasus and in Central Asia, and the Asiatic wildcat. It is expanding beyond its native grounds in from Southeast Europe into Central Europe as far as France and the Baltic region into areas where there are few or no wolves.

== Etymology and naming ==
The word 'jackal' appeared in the English language around 1600. It derives from the Turkish word çakal, which originates from the Persian word šagāl. The golden jackal is also known as the common jackal.

== Taxonomy ==
The biological family Canidae is composed of the South American canids, the fox-like canids, and the wolf-like canids. All species within the wolf-like canids share a similar morphology and possess 78 chromosomes, allowing them potentially to interbreed. Within the wolf-like canids is the jackal group, which includes the three jackals: the black-backed jackal (Lupulella mesomela), the side-striped jackal (Lupulella adusta), and the golden jackal (Canis aureus). These three species are approximately the same size, possess similar dental and skeletal morphology, and are identified from each other primarily by their coat color. They were once thought to have different distributions across Africa with their ranges overlapping in East Africa (Ethiopia, Kenya, and Tanzania). Although the jackal group has traditionally been considered as homogenous, genetic studies show that jackals are not monophyletic (they do not share a common ancestor), and they are only distantly related. The accuracy of the colloquial name "jackal" to describe all jackals is therefore questionable.

Mitochondrial DNA (mDNA) passes along the maternal line and can date back thousands of years. Thus, phylogenetic analysis of mDNA sequences within a species provides a history of maternal lineages that can be represented as a phylogenetic tree. A 2005 genetic study of the canids found that the gray wolf and dog are the most closely related on this tree. The next most closely related are the coyote (Canis latrans), golden jackal, and Ethiopian wolf (Canis simensis), which have all been shown to hybridize with the dog in the wild. The next closest are the dhole (Cuon alpinus) and African wild dog (Lycaon pictus), which are not members of genus Canis. These are followed by the black-backed and side-striped jackals, members of the genus Lupulella and the most basal members of this clade.

Results from two recent studies of mDNA from golden jackals indicate that the specimens from Africa are genetically closer to the gray wolf than are the specimens from Eurasia. In 2015, a major DNA study of golden jackals concluded that the six C. aureus subspecies in Africa should be reclassified under the new species C. anthus (African wolf), reducing the number of golden jackal subspecies to seven. The phylogenetic tree generated from this study shows the golden jackal diverging from the wolf/coyote lineage 1.9 million years ago and the African wolf diverging 1.3 million years ago; golden jackal and the African wolf shared a very similar skull and body morphology, which had confused taxonomists into regarding these as one species. The very similar skull and body morphology is likely due to both species having originated from a larger common ancestor.

=== Evolution ===
Phylogenetic tree of the wolf-like canids with timing in millions of years (Note: For a full set of supporting references refer to the note (a) in the phylotree at Evolution of the wolf#Wolf-like canids)

- Caninae 3.5 Ma
  - 3.0
    - 2.5
      - 2.0
        - 0.96
          - 0.6
            - 0.38
              - - - Domestic dog
                  - Gray wolf
              - Coyote
            - African wolf
          - Golden jackal
        - Ethiopian wolf
      - Dhole
    - African wild dog
  - - 2.6
      - Side-striped jackal
      - Black-backed jackal

The Arno river dog (Canis arnensis) is an extinct species of canine that was endemic to Mediterranean Europe during the Early Pleistocene around 1.9 million years ago. It is described as a small jackal-like dog and probably the ancestor of modern jackals. Its anatomy and morphology relate it more to the modern golden jackal than to the two African jackal species, the black-backed jackal and the side-striped jackal.

The oldest golden jackal fossil was found at the Ksar Akil rock shelter located 10 km (6.2 mi) northeast of Beirut, Lebanon. The fragment of a single tooth is dated approximately 7,600 years ago. The oldest golden jackal fossils found in Europe are from Delphi and Kitsos in Greece and are dated 7,000–6,500 years ago. An unusual fossil of a heel bone found in Azykh Cave, in Nagorno-Karabakh, dates to the Middle Pleistocene and is described as probably belonging to the golden jackal, but its classification is not clear. The fossil is described as being slightly smaller and thinner than the cave lynx, similar to the fox, but too large, and similar to the wolf, but too small. As the golden jackal falls between these two in size, the fossil possibly belongs to a golden jackal. The absence of clearly identified golden jackal fossils in the Caucasus region and Transcaucasia, areas where the species currently resides, indicates that the species is a relatively recent arrival.

A haplotype is a group of genes found in an organism that is inherited from one of its parents. A haplogroup is a group of similar haplotypes that share a single mutation inherited from their common ancestor. The mDNA haplotypes of the golden jackal form two haplogroups: the oldest haplogroup is formed by golden jackals from India, and the other, younger, haplogroup diverging from this includes golden jackals from all of the other regions. Indian golden jackals exhibit the highest genetic diversity, and those from northern and western India are the most basal, which indicates that India was the center from which golden jackals spread. The extant golden jackal lineage commenced expanding its population in India 37,000 years ago. During the Last Glacial Maximum, 25,000 to 18,000 years ago, the warmer regions of India and Southeast Asia provided a refuge from colder surrounding areas. At the end of the Last Glacial Maximum and the beginning of the warming cycles, the golden jackal lineage expanded out of India and into Eurasia to reach the Middle East and Europe.

Outside of India, golden jackals in the Caucasus and Turkey demonstrate the next highest genetic diversity, while those in Europe show low genetic diversity, confirming their more recent expansion into Europe. Genetic data indicates that the golden jackals of the Peloponnese Peninsula in Greece and the Dalmatian coast in Croatia may represent two ancient European populations from 6,000 years ago that have survived into modern times. Jackals were absent from most of Europe until the 19th century, when they started to expand slowly. Jackals were recorded in Hungary with the nearest population known at that time being found in Dalmatia, some 300 kilometers away. This was followed by rapid expansion of jackals towards the end of the 20th century. Golden jackals from both Southeast Europe and the Caucasus are expanding into the Baltic. In the Middle East, golden jackals from Israel have a higher genetic diversity than European jackals. This is thought to be due to Israeli jackals having hybridized with dogs, gray wolves, and African golden wolves, creating a hybrid zone in Israel.

=== Admixture with other Canis species ===
Genetic analysis reveals that mating sometimes occurs between female jackals and gray wolves, producing jackal-wolf hybrids that experts cannot visually distinguish from wolves. Hybridization also occurs between female golden jackals and male dogs, which produces fertile offspring, a jackal–dog hybrid. There was 11–13% of ancient gene flow into the golden jackal from the population that was ancestral to wolves and dogs, and an additional 3% from extant wolf populations. Up to 15% of the Israeli wolf genome is derived from admixture with golden jackals in ancient times.

In 2018, whole genome sequencing was used to compare members of the genus Canis. The study supports the African wolf being distinct from the golden jackal, and with the Ethiopian wolf being genetically basal to both. There is evidence of gene flow between African golden wolves, golden jackals, and gray wolves. One African wolf from the Egyptian Sinai Peninsula showed high admixture with the Middle Eastern gray wolves and dogs, highlighting the role of the land bridge between the African and Eurasian continents in canid evolution. There was evidence of gene flow between golden jackals and Middle Eastern wolves, less so with European and Asian wolves, and least with North American wolves. The study proposes that the golden jackal ancestry found in North American wolves may have occurred before the divergence of the Eurasian and North American wolves.

=== Subspecies and populations ===
The golden jackal was taxonomically subordinated to the genus Canis by Carl Linnaeus in his 1758 publication Systema Naturae. 13 subspecies were described since then.

Subspecies of Canis aureus
Subspecies	Trinomial authority	Trinomial authority (year)	Description	Distribution	Synonyms
Persian jackal C. a. aureus Nominate subspecies	Linnaeus	1758	Large, with soft, pale fur with predominantly sandy tones. The general color of the outer fur is usually black and white, while the underfur varies from pale brown to pale slate-grey. Occasionally, the nape and shoulders are of a buff color. The ears and front legs are buff, sometimes tan, while the feet are pale. The hind legs are more deeply tinted above the hocks. The chin and forethroat are usually whitish. Weight varies geographically, ranging around 8–10 kg (18–22 lb). In areas where it borders the range of the larger, more richly colored Indian jackal (particularly the area of Kumaun in India), animals of intermediate size and color sometimes appear.	Middle East, Iran, Turkmenistan, Afghanistan, Pakistan and Western India where its distribution overlaps with the Indian jackal to the north and the Sri Lankan/South Indian jackal to the south.	hadramauticus (Noack, 1896) kola (Wroughton, 1916) lanka (Wroughton, 1916) typicus (Kolenati, 1858) vulgaris (Wagner, 1841)
Indochinese jackal C. a. cruesemanni	Matschie	1900	The Indochinese jackal (also known as the Siamese jackal and the Southeast Asian golden jackal) has been disputed as a separate subspecies by some authors who state that its classification is based solely on observations of captive animals. In 2023, an mDNA study indicated that it was an early branching lineage of golden jackal which supports it being a subspecies. It is smaller than C. a. indicus, weighing up to 8 kg (18 lb). Its fur closely resembles that of a dog. It inhabits mountainous areas, near farms or residential forests, and its prey include small animals like birds, reptiles and frogs, besides occasionally eating fruits. One seller of two trapped jackals claimed that they killed ten piglets on his farm. It can be active in both day and night. Siamese jackals are solitary creatures, but a male and female will cooperate during mating season. It has few natural predators, though dholes are a major source of mortality.	Thailand	
Indian jackal C. a. indicus	Hodgson	1833	Its fur is a mixture of black and white, with buff on the shoulders, ears and legs. The buff color is more pronounced in specimens from high altitudes. Black hairs predominate on the middle of the back and tail. The belly, chest and the sides of the legs are creamy white, while the face and lower flanks are grizzled with gray fur. Adults grow to a length of 100 cm (39 in), 35–45 cm (14–18 in) in height and 8–11 kg (18–24 lb) in weight.	India, Nepal, Bangladesh, Bhutan	
European jackal C. a. moreoticus	I. Geoffroy Saint-Hilaire	1835	The largest golden jackal subspecies, animals of both sexes average 120–125 cm (47–49 in) in total length and 10–15 kg (22–33 lb) in body weight. The fur is coarse, and is generally brightly colored with blackish tones on the back. The thighs, upper legs, ears and forehead are bright-reddish chestnut.	Southeastern Europe, Moldova, Asia Minor and the Caucasus	graecus (Wagner, 1841) balcanicus (Brusina, 1892) caucasica (Kolenati, 1858) dalmatinus (Wagner, 1841)
Sri Lankan jackal C. a. naria	Wroughton	1916	Measures 67–74 cm (26–29 in) in length and weighs 5–8.6 kg (11–19 lb). The winter coat is shorter, smoother and not as shaggy as that of indicus. The coat is also darker on the back, being black and speckled with white. The underside is more pigmented on the chin, hind throat, chest and forebelly, while the limbs are rusty ochreous or a rich tan. Molting occurs earlier in the season than with indicus, and the pelt generally does not lighten in color.	Coastal South West India, Sri Lanka	lanka (Wroughton, 1838)
Syrian jackal C. a. syriacus	Hemprich and Ehrenberg	1833	Distinguished by its brown ears. The body fur is a yellow on the back, lighter on the sides, and whitish-yellow underneath. A dark band runs from the nose to the end of the tail. Measures 60–90 cm (24–35 in) in body length, 20–30 cm (7.9–11.8 in) in tail length, 15–18 cm (5.9–7.1 in) in head length, and weighs 5–12 kg (11–26 lb).	Israel, Syria, Lebanon, and Jordan	

== Description ==
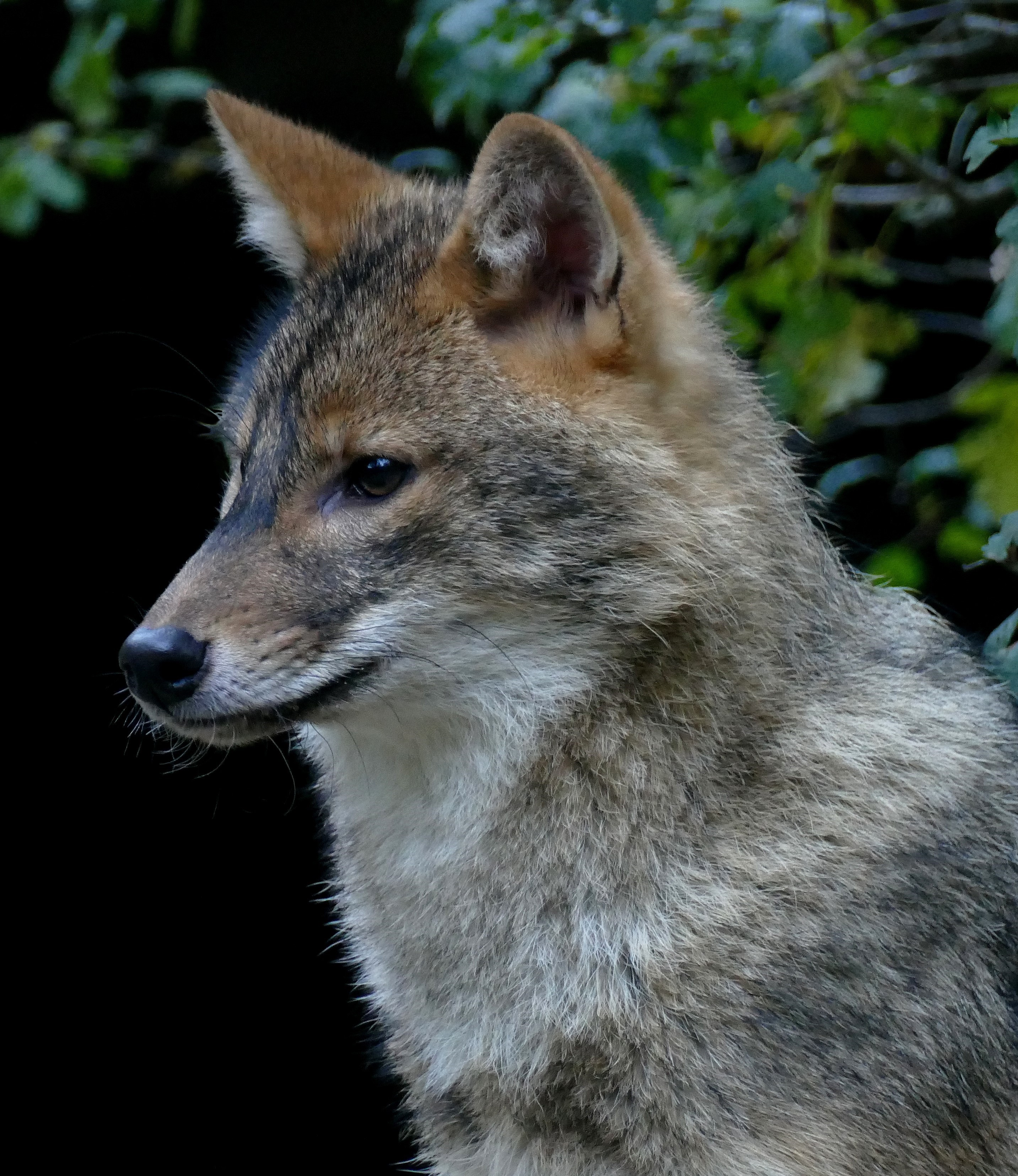
Golden jackal profile

The golden jackal is similar to the gray wolf but is distinguished by its smaller size, lighter weight, more elongated torso, less-prominent forehead, shorter legs and tail, and a muzzle that is narrower and more pointed. The legs are long in relation to its body, and the feet are slender with small pads. Males measure 71–85 cm (28–33 in) in body length and females 69–73 cm (27–29 in). Males weigh 6–14 kg (13–31 lb) and females weigh 7–11 kg (15–24 lb). The shoulder height is 45–50 cm (18–20 in) for both. In comparison, the smallest grey wolf subspecies is the Arabian wolf (Canis lupus arabs), which weighs on average 20 kg (44 lb).

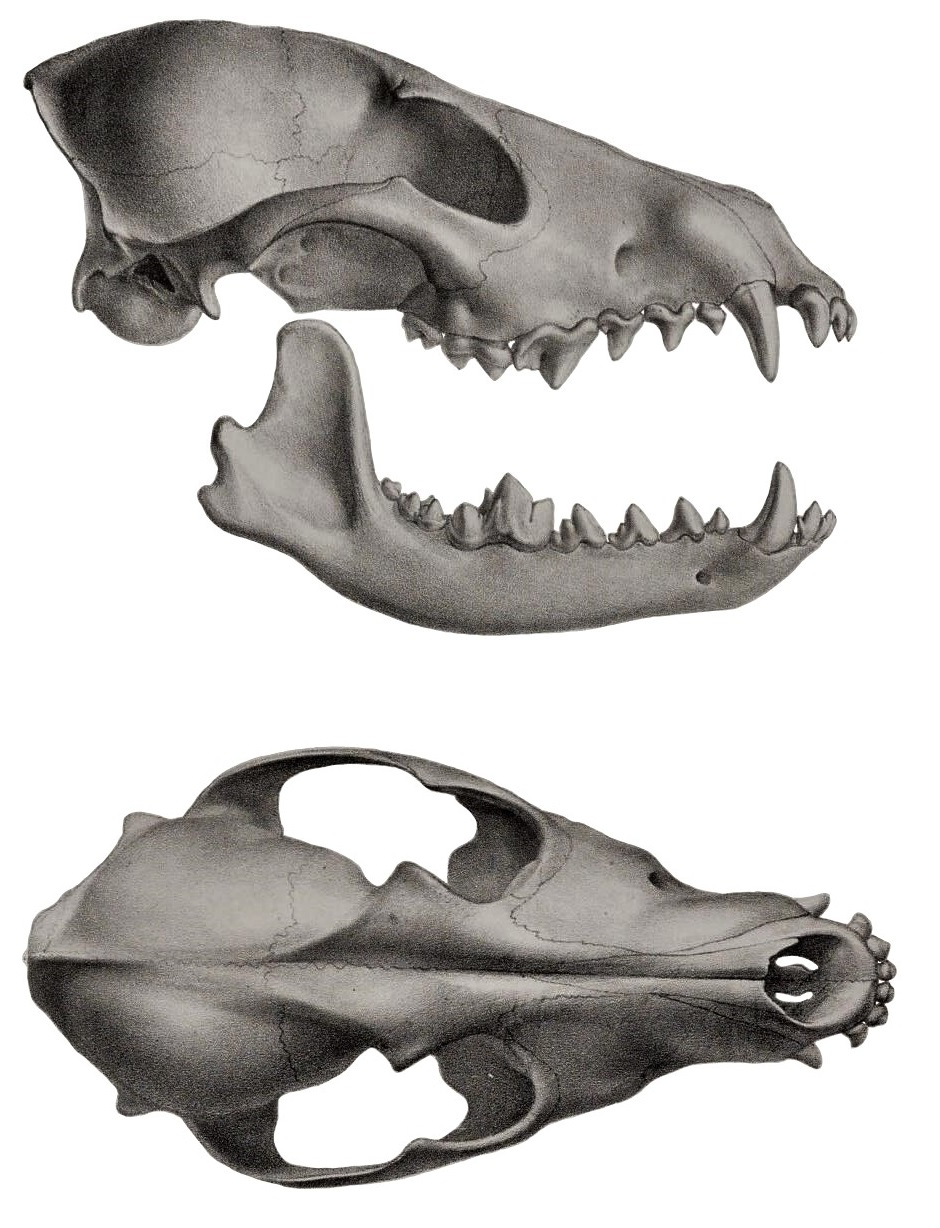
Lateral and dorsal aspects of skull

The skull is most like that of the dingo, and is closer to that of the coyote (C. latrans) and the gray wolf (C. lupus) than to that of the black-backed jackal (L. mesomalas), the side-striped jackal (L. adustus), and the Ethiopian wolf (C. simensis). Compared with the wolf, the skull of the golden jackal is smaller and less massive, with a lower nasal region and shorter facial region; the projections of the skull are prominent but weaker than those of the wolf; the canine teeth are large and strong but relatively thinner; and its carnassial teeth are weaker. The golden jackal is a less specialized species than the gray wolf, and these skull features relate to the jackal's diet of small birds, rodents, small vertebrates, insects, carrion, fruit, and some vegetable matter. It was once thought that golden jackals could develop a horny growth on the skull referred to as a "jackal's horn" which usually measured approximately 13 mm (1/2 in) in length and was concealed by fur. Although no evidence of its existence has been found, belief in it remains common in South Asia. This feature was once associated with magical powers by the people of Sri Lanka.

The jackal's fur is coarse and relatively short, with the base color golden, varying seasonally from a pale creamy yellow to a dark tawny. The fur on the back is composed of a mixture of black, brown, and white hairs, sometimes giving the appearance of the dark saddle like that seen on the black-backed jackal. The underparts are a light pale ginger to cream color. Individual specimens can be distinguished by their unique light markings on the throat and chest. The coats of jackals from high elevations tend to be more buff-colored than those of their lowland counterparts while those of jackals in rocky, mountainous areas may exhibit a grayer shade. The bushy tail has a tan to black tip. Melanism can cause a dark-colored coat in some golden jackals, a coloring once fairly common in Bengal. Unlike melanistic wolves and coyotes that received their dark pigmentation from interbreeding with domestic dogs, melanism in golden jackals probably stems from an independent mutation that could be an adaptive trait. What is possibly an albino specimen was photographed in southeastern Iran during 2012.

The jackal moults twice a year, in spring and in autumn. In Transcaucasia and Tajikistan, the spring moult begins at the end of winter. If the winter has been warm, the spring moult starts in the middle of February; if the winter has been cold, it begins in the middle of March. The spring moult lasts for 60–65 days; if the animal is sick, it loses only half of its winter fur. The spring moult commences with the head and limbs, extends to the flanks, chest, belly and rump, and ends at the tail. Fur on the underparts is absent. The autumn moult occurs from mid-September with the growth of winter fur; the shedding of the summer fur occurs at the same time. The development of the autumn coat starts with the rump and tail and spreads to the back, flanks, belly, chest, limbs and head, with full winter fur being attained at the end of November.

== Ecology ==
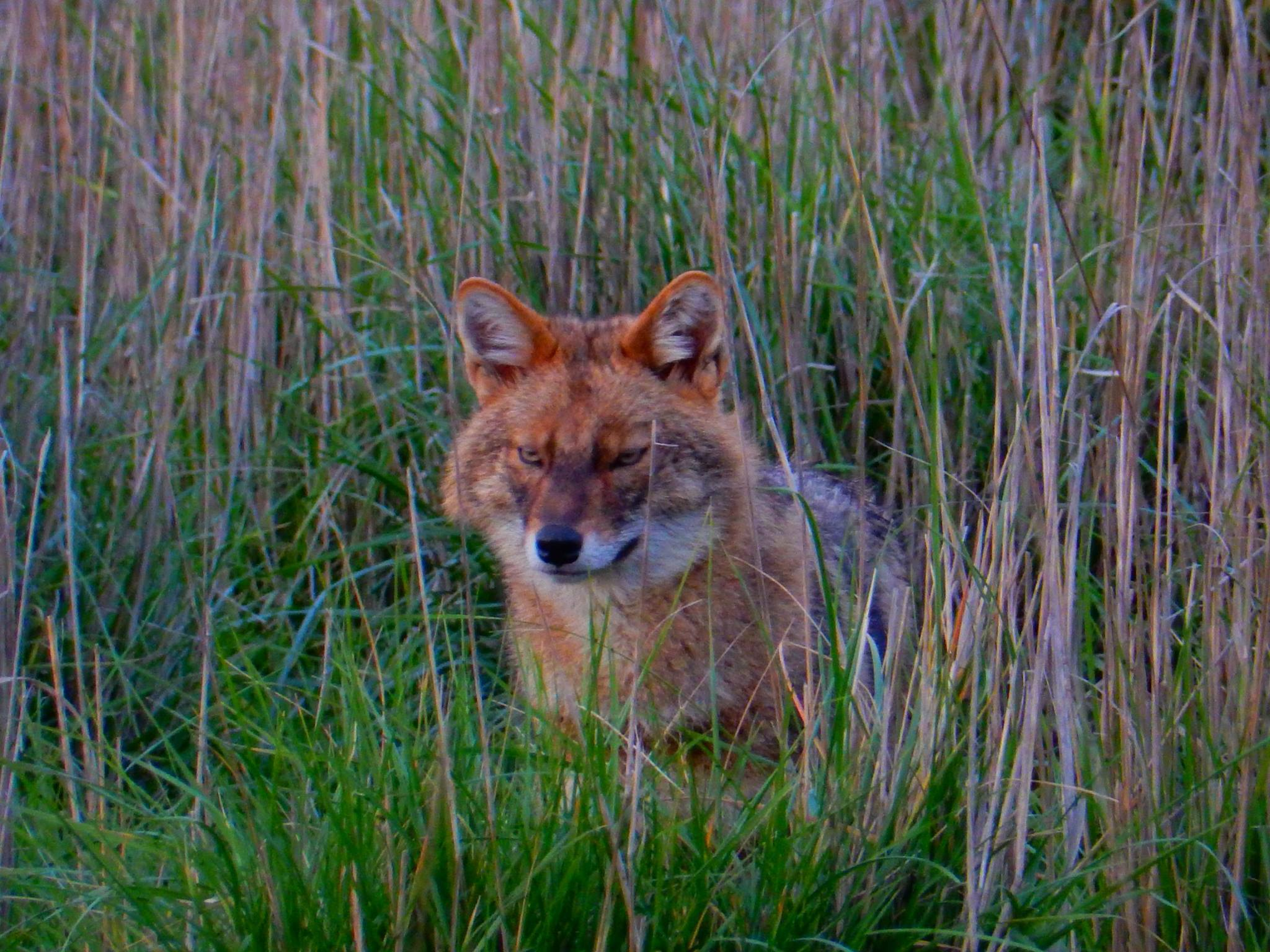
Syrian jackal (C. a. syriacus) hunting in reeds

The golden jackal inhabits Europe and Southwest, Central, South, and Southeast Asia. The golden jackal's omnivorous diet allows it to eat a large range of foods; this diet, together with its tolerance of dry conditions, enables it to live in different habitats. The jackal's long legs and lithe body allow it to trot over great distances in search of food. It is able to go without water for extended periods and has been observed on islands that have no fresh water. Jackals are abundant in valleys and along rivers and their tributaries, canals, lakes, and seashores, but are rare in foothills and low mountains. In Central Asia they avoid waterless deserts and cannot be found in the Karakum Desert nor the Kyzylkum Desert, but can be found at their edges or in oases. On the other hand, in India they can be found living in the Thar Desert. They are found in dense thickets of prickly bushes, reed flood-lands and forests. They have been known to ascend over 1,000 m (3,300 ft) up the slopes of the Himalayas; they can withstand temperatures as low as −25 °C (−13 °F) and sometimes −35 °C (−31 °F). They are not adapted to snow, and in snow country they must travel along paths made by larger animals or humans. In India, they will occupy the surrounding foothills above arable areas, entering human settlements at night to feed on garbage, and have established themselves around hill stations at the elevation of 2,000 m (6,600 ft).

They generally avoid mountainous forests, but may enter alpine and sub-alpine areas during dispersal. In Turkey, the Caucasus, and Transcaucasia they have been observed up to the elevation of 1,000 m (3,300 ft), particularly in areas where the climate supports shrublands in high elevations. The Estonian population, which marks the only population of this species adapted to the boreal region, largely inhabits coastal grasslands, alvars, and reed beds, habitats where wolves are seldom present. In Finland, a golden jackal has been trapped near Sodankylä within the Arctic Circle.

=== Diet ===
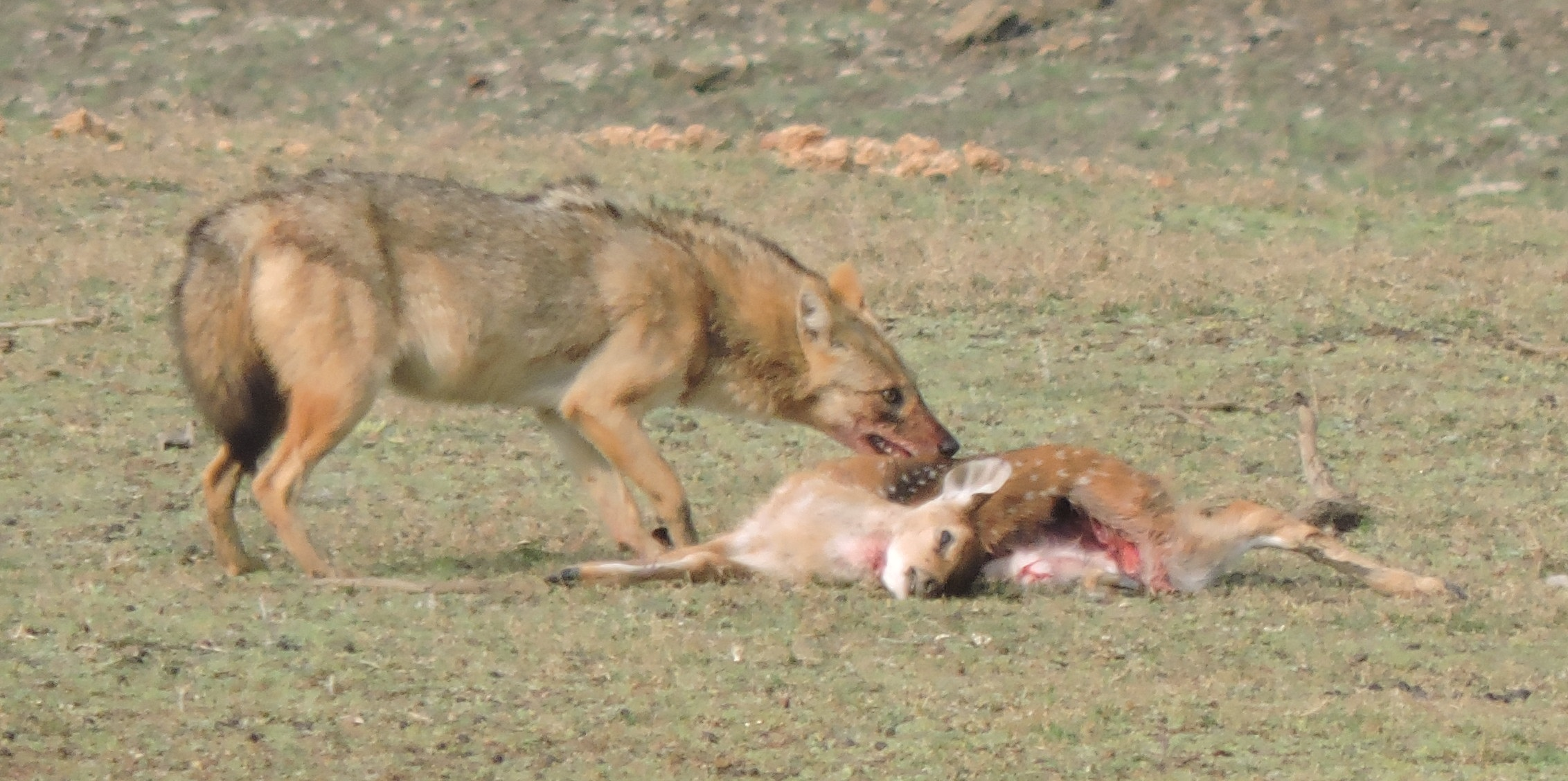
Indian jackal (C. a. indicus) feeding on chital carcass in Pench National Park

The golden jackal fills much the same ecological niche in Eurasia as the coyote does in North America; it is both a predator and a scavenger, and an omnivorous and opportunistic forager with a diet that varies according to its habitat and the season. In Keoladeo National Park, India, over 60% of its diet was measured to consist of rodents, birds, and fruit. In the Kanha Tiger Reserve, 80% of its diet consists of rodents, reptiles and fruit. Vegetable matter forms part of the jackal diet; in India, they feed intensively on the fruits of buckthorn, dogbane, Java plum, and the pods of mesquite and the golden rain tree. The jackal scavenges off the kills made by the lion, tiger, leopard, dhole, and gray wolf. In some regions of Bangladesh and India, golden jackals subsist by scavenging on carrion and garbage, and will cache extra food by burying it. The Irish novelist, playwright and poet, Oliver Goldsmith, wrote about the golden jackal:

... Although the species of the wolf approaches very near to that of the dog, yet the jackal seems to be placed between them; to the savage fierceness of the wolf it adds the impudent familiarity of the dog ... It is more noisy in its pursuits even than the dog, and more voracious than the wolf.

— Oliver Goldsmith

In the Caucasus and Transcaucasia, golden jackals primarily hunt hares and mouse-like rodents, and also pheasants, francolins, ducks, coots, moorhens, and passerines. Vegetable matter eaten by Jackals in these areas includes fruits, such as pears, hawthorn, dogwood, and the cones of common medlars. The jackal is implicated in the destruction of grape, watermelon, muskmelon, and nut crops. Near the Vakhsh River, their spring diet consists almost exclusively of plant bulbs and the roots of wild sugar cane, while during winter they feed on wild stony olives. Around the edges of the Karakum Desert, jackals feed on gerbils, lizards, snakes, fish, muskrats, the fruits of wild stony olives, mulberry, dried apricots, watermelons, muskmelons, tomatoes, and grapes.

In Dalmatia, the golden jackal's diet consists of mammals, fruits, vegetables, insects, birds and their eggs, grasses and leaves. Golden jackals change their diet to more readily available foods. In Serbia, their diet is primarily livestock carcasses that are increasingly prevalent due to a lack of removal, and this may have led to the expansion of their population. In Hungary, 55% of their diet is composed of common voles and bank voles, and 41% is composed of wild boar carcasses. Information on the diet of the golden jackal in northeastern Italy is scant, but it is known to prey on small roe deer and hares. In Israel, golden jackals are significant predators of snakes; during a poisoning campaign against golden jackals there was an increase in human snakebite reports, but a decrease when the poisoning ceased.

=== Competition ===
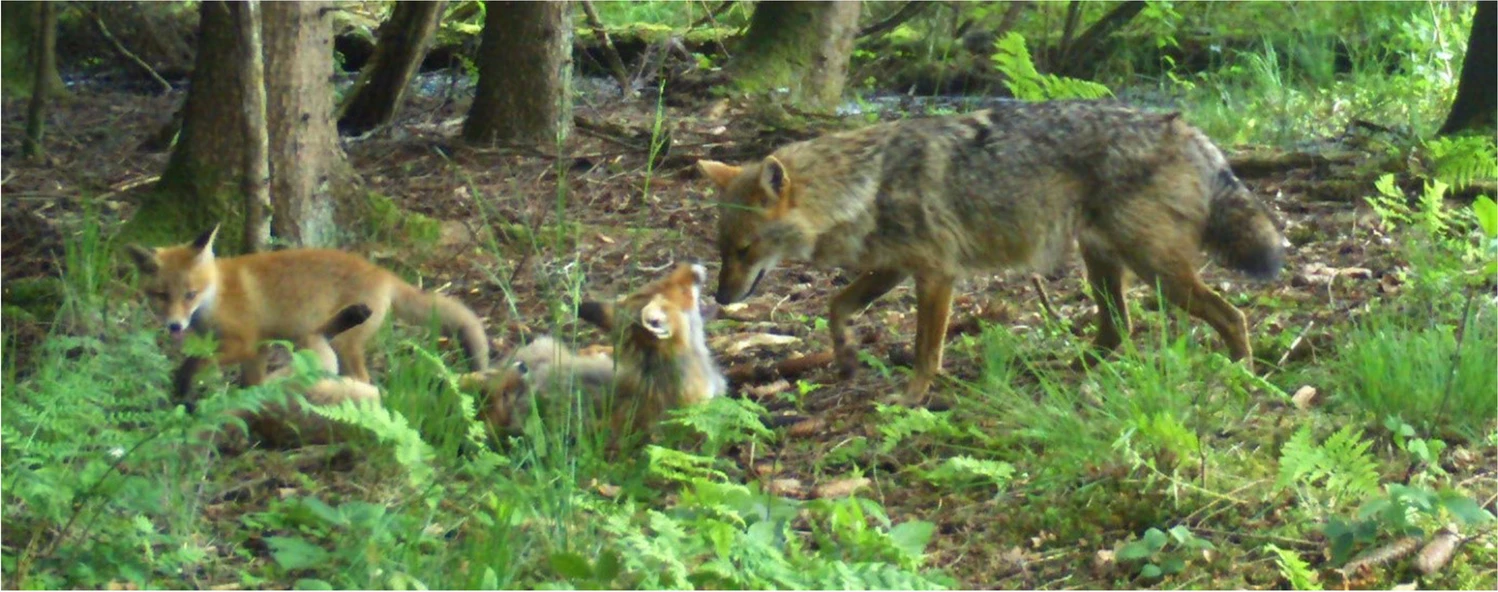
Male golden jackal interacting with a female red fox and its kits in south-western Germany

The jackal's competitors are the red fox, wolf, jungle cat, wildcat, and raccoon in the Caucasus, and the steppe wildcat in Central Asia. Wolves dominate jackals, and jackals dominate foxes. In 2017 in Iran, an Indian wolf under study killed a golden jackal. In Europe, the range of wolves and jackals is mutually exclusive, with jackals abandoning their territory with the arrival of a wolf pack. One experiment used loudspeakers to broadcast the calls of jackals, and this attracted wolves at a trotting pace to chase away the perceived competitors. Dogs responded to these calls in the same way while barking aggressively. Unleashed dogs have been observed to immediately chase away jackals when the jackals were detected. In Europe, there are an estimated 12,000 wolves. The jackal's recent expansion throughout eastern and western Europe has been attributed to the extermination of the local wolf populations. The present diffusion of the jackal into the northern Adriatic hinterland is in areas where the wolf is absent or very rare. In the past, golden jackals competed with tigers and leopards, feeding on the remains of their kills and, in one case, on a dead tiger. Leopards and tigers once hunted golden jackals, but today, the leopard is rare, and the tiger is extinct in the golden jackal's range. Eurasian lynxes are also known to hunt golden jackals.

Red foxes and golden jackals share similar diets. Red foxes fear jackals, which are three times bigger than them. Red foxes will avoid close proximity to jackals and fox populations decrease where jackals are abundant. Foxes can be found only at the fringes of jackal territory. There is however one record of a male golden jackal interacting peacefully with multiple red foxes in southwestern Germany. There is only one recorded case of golden jackals submitting and being displaced by a red fox, in a feeding site in northern Greece.

Striped hyenas prey on golden jackals, and three jackal carcasses were found in one hyena den.

A 2022 study indicated that the presence of golden jackals in portions of eastern Europe leads to a decrease in the population of invasive common raccoon dog (Nyctereutes procyonoides), indicating a potentially positive consequence of the jackal colonization of Europe.

=== Diseases and parasites ===
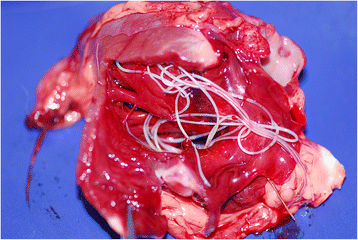
Adult heartworm in the right ventricle of the heart of a golden jackal

Some golden jackals carry diseases and parasites harmful to human health. These include rabies, and Donovan's Leishmania that is harmless to jackals but may cause leishmaniasis in people. Jackals in southwestern Tajikistan can carry up to 16 species of parasitic cestodes, roundworms, and acanthocephalans, these are: Sparganum mansoni, Diphyllobothrium mansonoides, Taenia hydatigena, T. pisiformis, T. ovis, Hydatigera taeniaeformis, Dipylidium caninum, Mesocestoides lineatus, Ancylostoma caninum, Uncinaria stenocephala, Dioctophyma renale, Toxocara canis, Toxascaris leonina, Dracunculus medinensis, Filariata and Macracanthorhynchus catulinum. Jackals infected with Dracunculus medinensis can infect bodies of water with their eggs, which cause dracunculiasis in people who drink from them. Golden jackals may also play a large part in spreading coenurosis in sheep and cattle, and canine distemper in dogs. In Tajikistan, jackals may carry up to 12 tick species including Ixodes, Rhipicephalus turanicus, R. leporis, R. rossicus, R. sanguineus, R. pumilio, R. schulzei, Hyalomma anatolicum, H. scupense and H. asiaticum, the four flea species Pulex irritans, Xenopsylla nesokiae, Ctenocephanlides canis and C. felis, and one louse species (Trichodectes canis).

In Iran, some golden jackals carry intestinal worms (helminths) and Echinococcus granulosus. In Israel, some jackals are infected with intestinal helminths and Leishmania tropica. In Romania, a jackal was found to be carrying Trichinella britovi. In northeastern Italy, the jackal is a carrier of the tick species Ixodes ricinus and Dermacentor reticulatus, and the smallest human fluke Metagonimus yokogawai that can be caught from ingesting infected raw fish. In Hungary, some jackals carry dog heartworm Dirofilaria immitis, and some have provided the first record in Hungary of Trichinella spiralis and the first record in Europe of Echinococcus multilocularis. A golden jackel from Iran was found to be a host of an intestinal acanthocephalan worm, Pachysentis canicola.

== Behavior ==
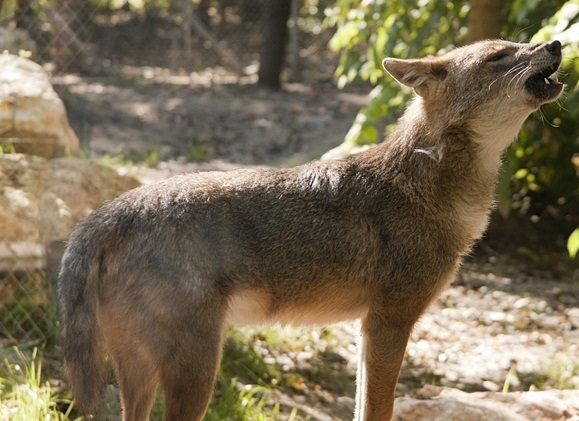
Howling at the Szeged Zoo, Hungary

=== Social behavior ===
Golden jackals exhibit flexible social organization depending on the availability of food. The breeding pair is the basic social unit, and they are sometimes accompanied by their current litter of pups. In India, their distributions are a single jackal, 31%, two jackals, 35%, three jackals, 14%, and more than three jackals, 20%. Family groups of up to 4–5 individuals have been recorded. Scent marking through urination and defecation is common around golden jackal den areas and on the trails they most often use. Scent marking is thought to assist in territorial defense. The hunting ranges of several jackals can overlap. Jackals can travel up to 12–15 km (7.5–9.3 mi) during a single night in search of either food or more suitable habitat. Non-breeding members of a pack may stay near a distant food source, such as a carcass, for up to several days before returning to their home range. Home range sizes can vary between 1–20 km^{2} (0.39–7.72 mi^{2}), depending on the available food.

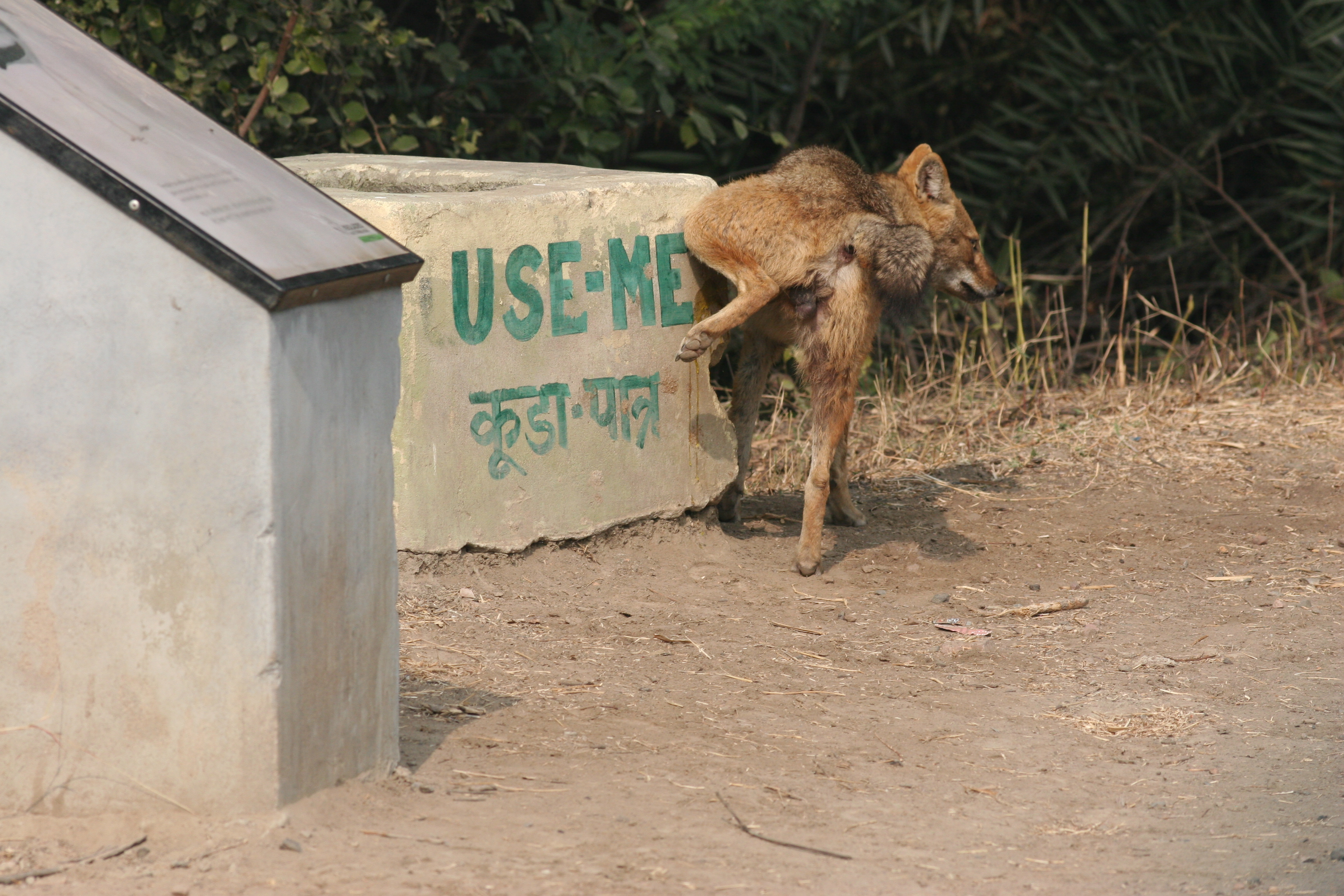
Scent marking in Keoladeo National Park

Social interactions such as greetings, grooming, and group howling are common in jackals. Howling is more frequent between December and April when pair bonds are being formed and breeding occurs, which suggests howling has a role in the delineation of territory and for defense. Adult jackals howl standing and the young or subordinate jackals howl sitting. Jackals are easily induced to howl and a single howl may solicit replies from several jackals in the vicinity. Howling begins with 2–3 low-pitched calls that rise to high-pitched calls. The howl consists of a wail repeated 3–4 times on an ascending scale, followed by three short yelps. Jackals typically howl at dawn and in the evening, and sometimes at midday. Adults may howl to accompany the ringing of church bells, with their young responding to sirens or the whistles of steam engines and boats. Social canids such as golden jackals, wolves, and coyotes respond to human imitations of their howls. When there is a change in the weather, jackals will produce a long and continuous chorus. Dominant canids defend their territories against intruders with either a howl to warn them off, approach and confront them, or howl followed by an approach. Jackals, wolves and coyotes will always approach a source of howling. Golden jackals give a warning call that is very different from their normal howling when they detect the presence of large carnivores such as wolves and tigers.

=== Reproduction ===
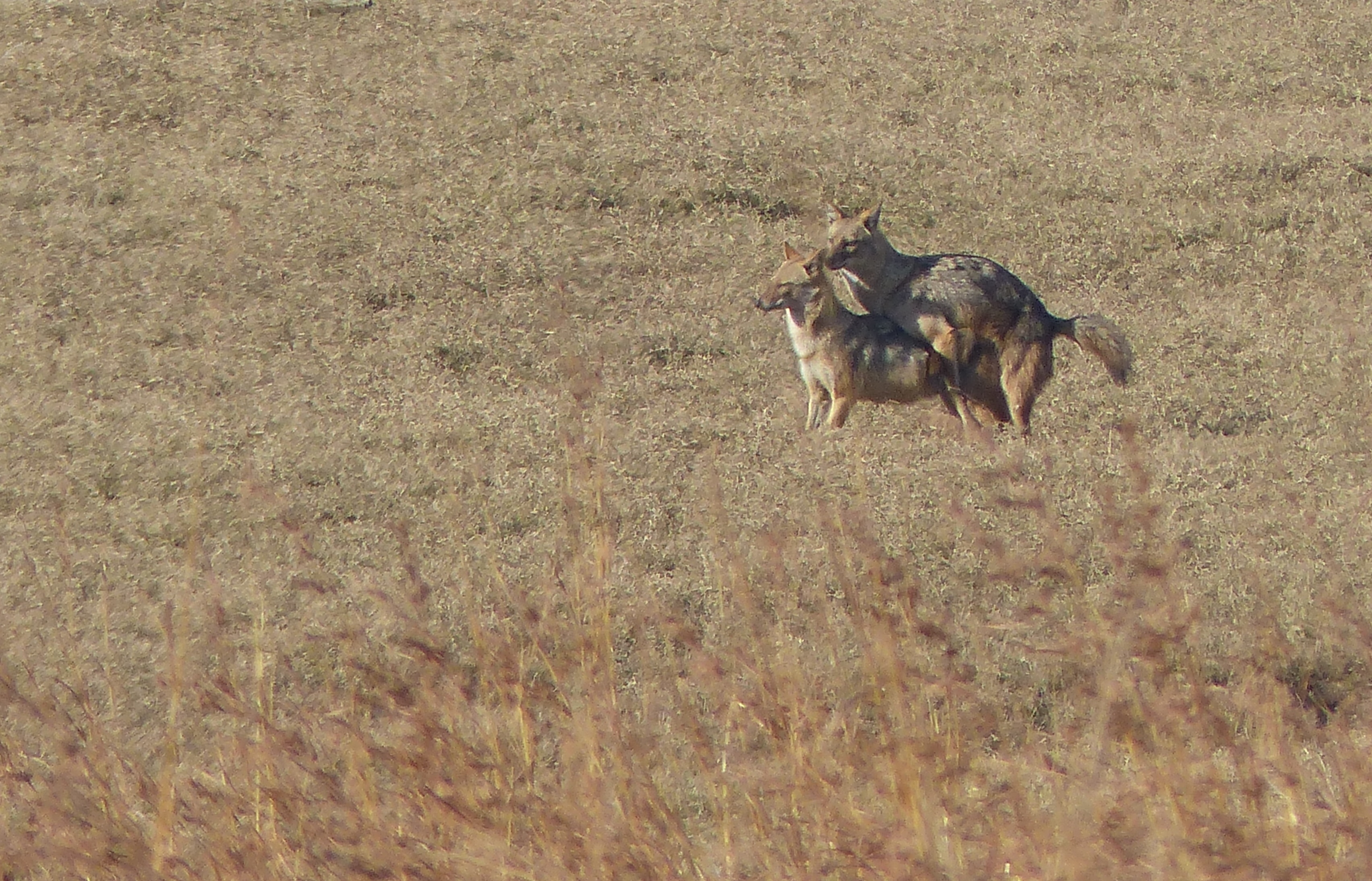
Golden jackals mating in Pench National Park

Golden jackals are monogamous and will remain with the one partner until death. Female jackals have only one breeding cycle each year. Breeding occurs from October to March in Israel and from February to March in India, Turkmenistan, Bulgaria, and Transcaucasia, with the mating period lasting up to 26–28 days. Females undergoing their first estrus are often pursued by several males that may quarrel among themselves. Mating results in a copulatory tie that lasts for several minutes, as it does with all other canids. Gestation lasts 63 days, and the timing of the births coincides with the annual abundance of food.

In India, the golden jackal will take over the dens of the Bengal fox and the Indian crested porcupine, and will use abandoned gray wolf dens. Most breeding pairs are spaced well apart and maintain a core territory around their dens. Den excavations commence from late April to May in India, with dens located in scrub areas. Rivulets, gullies, and road and check-dam embankments are prime denning habitats. Drainage pipes and culverts have been used as dens. Dens are 2–3 m (6.6–9.8 ft) long and 0.5–1 m (1.6–3.3 ft) deep, with between 1–3 openings. Young pups can be moved between 2–4 dens. The male helps with digging the den and raising the pups. In the Caucasus and Transcaucasia, the burrow is located either in thick shrub, on the slopes of gullies, or on flat surfaces. In Dagestan and Azerbaijan, litters are sometimes located within the hollows of fallen trees, among tree roots, and under stones on river banks. In Central Asia, the golden jackal does not dig burrows but constructs lairs in dense tugai thickets. Jackals in the tugais and cultivated lands of Tajikistan construct lairs in long grass, shrubs, and reed openings.

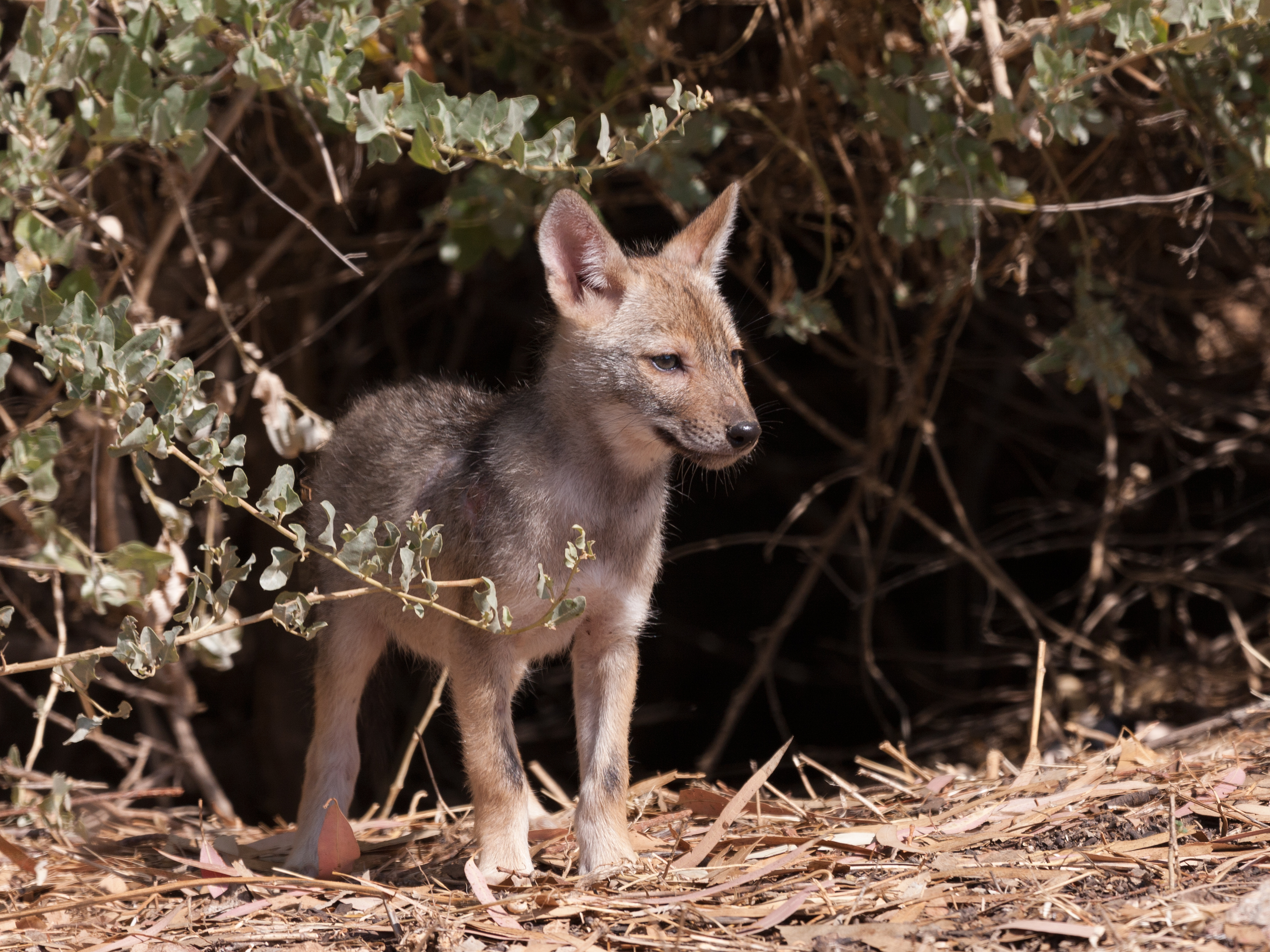
Syrian jackal (C. a. syriacus) pup at the entrance to its den, Yarkon Park, Israel

In Transcaucasia, golden jackal pups are born from late March to late April, and in northeastern Italy during late April; they can be born at any time of year in Nepal. The number of pups born in a single litter varies geographically. Jackals in Transcaucasia give birth to 3–8 pups, Tajikistan 3–7 pups, Uzbekistan 2–8 pups, and Bulgaria 4–7 pups; in India the average is four pups. The pups are born with closed eyes that open after 8–11 days, with the ears erecting after 10–13 days. Their teeth erupt at 11 days after birth, and the eruption of adult dentition is completed after five months. Pups are born with soft fur that ranges in color from light gray to dark brown. At the age of one month, their fur is shed and replaced with a new reddish-colored pelt with black speckles. The pups have a fast growth rate and weigh 0.201–0.214 kg (0.44–0.47 lb) at two days of age, 0.560–0.726 kg (1.23–1.60 lb) at one month, and 2.700–3.250 kg (5.95–7.17 lb) at four months. Females possess four pairs of teats, and lactation lasts for up to 8–10 weeks. The pups begin to eat meat at the age of 15–20 days.

Dog pups show unrestrained fighting with their siblings from 2 weeks of age, with injury avoided only due to their undeveloped jaw muscles. This fighting gives way to play-chasing with the development of running skills at 4–5 weeks. Wolf pups possess more-developed jaw muscles from 2 weeks of age, when they first show signs of play-fighting with their siblings; serious fighting occurs during 4–6 weeks of age. Compared to wolf and dog pups, golden jackal pups develop aggression at the age of 4–6 weeks, when play-fighting frequently escalates into uninhibited biting intended to harm. This aggression ceases by 10–12 weeks when a hierarchy has formed. Once the lactation period concludes, the female drives off the pups. Pups born late remain with their mother until early autumn, at which time they leave either singly or in groups of two to four individuals. Females reach sexual maturity after 10–11 months and males at 21–22 months.

=== Foraging ===
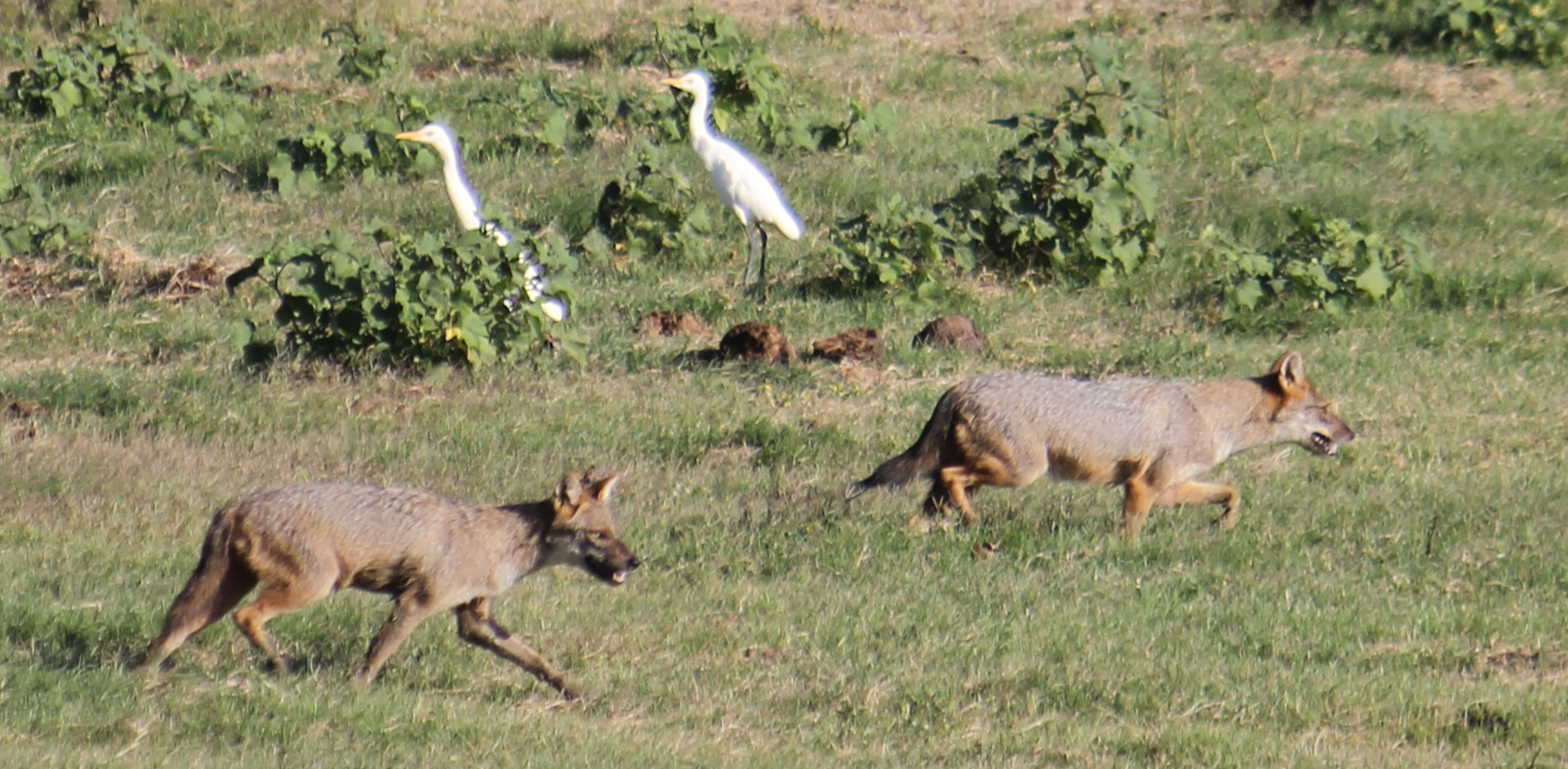
Pair of Sri Lankan jackals (C. a. naria) in Udawalawe National Park

The golden jackal often hunts alone, and sometimes in pairs, but rarely hunts in a pack. When hunting alone, it trots around an area and occasionally stops to sniff and listen. Once prey is located, the jackal conceals itself, quickly approaches its prey and then pounces on it. Single jackals hunt rodents, hares, and birds. They hunt rodents in grass by locating them with their hearing before leaping into the air and pouncing on them. In India, they can dig Indian gerbils out from their burrows, and they can hunt young, old, and infirm ungulates up to 4–5 times their body weight. Jackals search for hiding blackbuck calves throughout the day during the calving period. The peak times for their searches are the early morning and the late evening. When hunting in pairs or packs, jackals run parallel to their prey and overtake it in unison. When hunting aquatic rodents or birds, they will run along both sides of narrow rivers or streams and drive their prey from one jackal to another.

Pack-hunting of langurs is recorded in India. Packs of between 5 and 18 jackals scavenging on the carcasses of large ungulates is recorded in India and Israel. Packs of 8–12 jackals consisting of more than one family have been observed in the summer periods in Transcaucasia. In India, the Montagu's harrier and the Pallid harrier roost in their hundreds in grasslands during their winter migration. Jackals stalk close to these roosting harriers and then rush at them, attempting to catch one before the harriers can take off or gain sufficient height to escape.

In Southeastern Asia, golden jackals have been known to hunt alongside dhole packs. They have been observed in the Blackbuck National Park, Velavadar, India, following Indian wolves (Canis lupus pallipes) when these are on a hunt, and they will scavenge off wolf kills without any hostility shown from the wolves. In India, lone jackals expelled from their pack have been known to form commensal relationships with tigers. These solitary jackals, known as kol-bahl, will associate themselves with a particular tiger, trailing it at a safe distance to feed on the big cat's kills. A kol-bahl will even alert a tiger to prey with a loud "pheal". Tigers have been known to tolerate these jackals, with one report describing how a jackal confidently walked in and out between three tigers walking together. Golden jackals and wild boar can occupy the same territory.

== Conservation ==
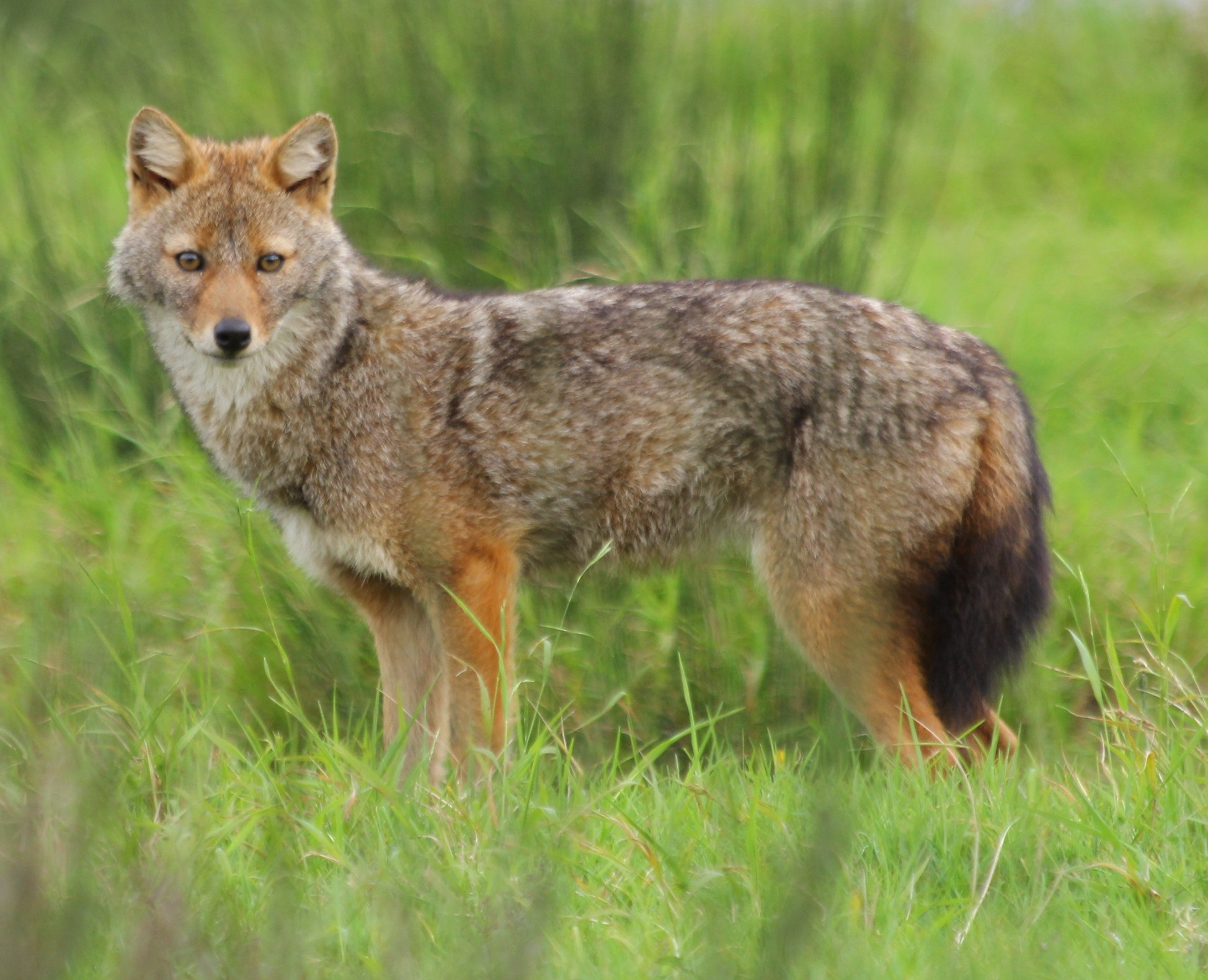
Indian jackal at Upper Bhavani, India

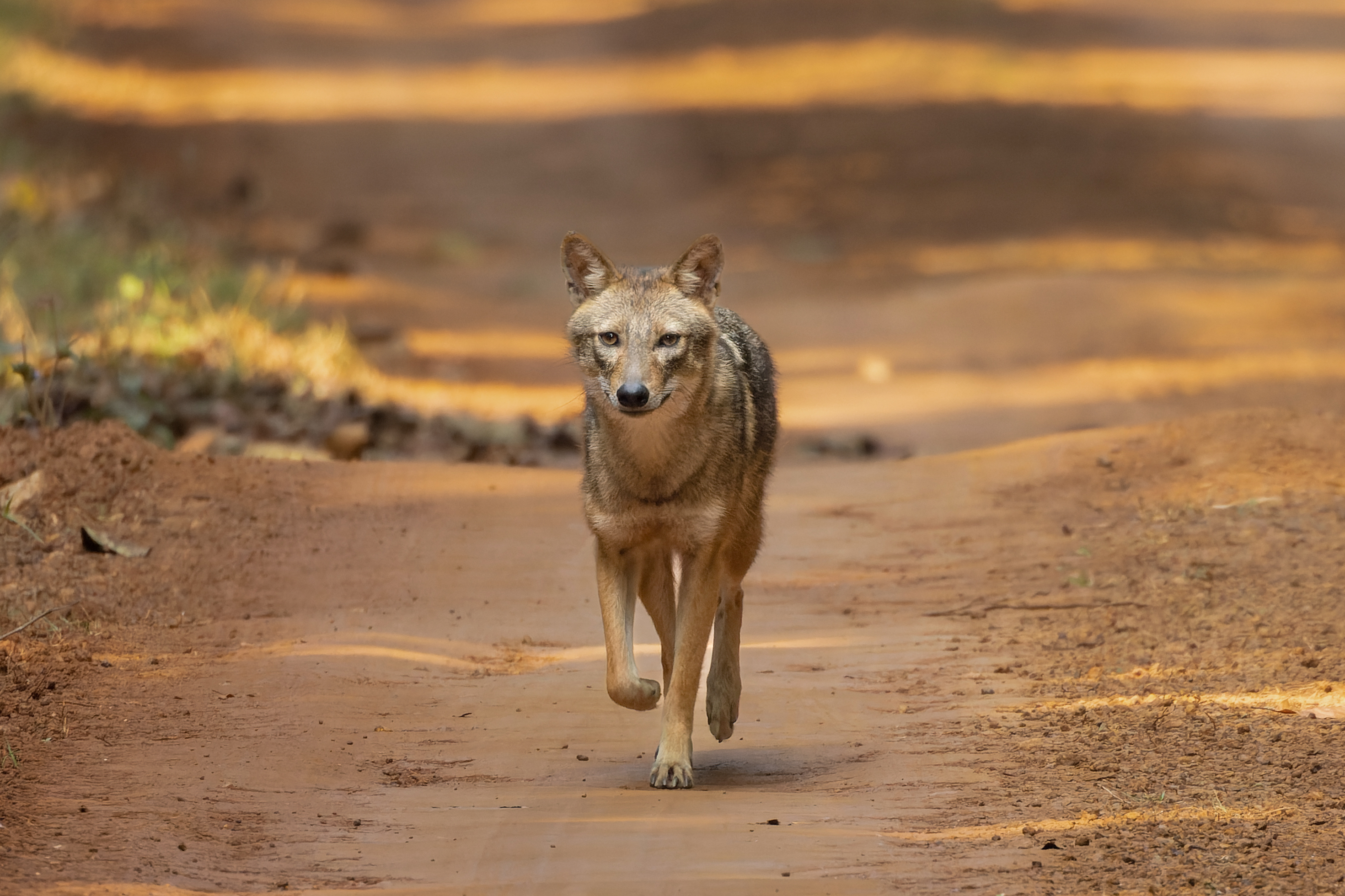
Golden jackal (Canis aureus) in Kuldiha Wildlife Sanctuary, Odisha, India.

The golden jackal is listed as Least Concern on the IUCN Red List due to its widespread distribution, with it being common throughout its range and with high densities in those areas where food and shelter are abundant. In Europe, golden jackals are not listed under the 1973 Convention on International Trade in Endangered Species of Wild Fauna and Flora nor the 1979 Convention on the Conservation of Migratory Species of Wild Animals. Golden jackals in Europe fall under various international legal instruments. These include the 1979 Berne Convention on the Conservation of European Wildlife and Natural Habitats, the 1992 Convention on Biological Diversity, and the 1992 European Union Council Directive 92/43/EEC on the Conservation of Natural Habitats and of Wild Fauna and Flora. The Council Directive provides both guidance and limits on what participating governments can do when responding to the arrival of expanding jackals. These legislative instruments aim to contribute to conserving native wildlife; some governments argue that the golden jackal is not native wildlife but an invading species. The Golden Jackal informal study Group in Europe (GOJAGE) is an organization that is formed by researchers from across Europe to collect and share information on the golden jackal in Europe. The group also has an interest in the golden jackal's relationship with its environment across Eurasia. Membership is open to anyone who has an interest in golden jackals.

In Europe, there are an estimated 70,000 golden jackals. They are fully protected in Albania, North Macedonia, Germany, Italy, Poland and Switzerland. They are unprotected in Belarus, Bosnia and Herzegovina, Czech Republic, Estonia, and Greece. They are hunted in Bosnia and Herzegovina, Bulgaria, Croatia, Hungary, Kosovo, Latvia, Lithuania, Montenegro, Romania, Serbia, Slovakia, Slovenia, and Ukraine. Their protection in Austria and Turkey depends on the part of the country. Their status in Moldova is not known. In July 2026 the Netherlands recognised the golden jackal as a native species, bringing it within the scope of the country's wildlife protection laws.

The Syrian jackal was common in Israel and Lebanon in the 1930s–40s, but their populations were reduced during an anti-rabies campaign. Its current status is difficult to ascertain, due to possible hybridisation with pariah dogs and African golden wolves. The jackal population for the Indian subcontinent is estimated to be over 80,000. In India, the golden jackal occurs in all of India's protected areas apart from those in the higher areas of the Himalayas. It is included in CITES Appendix III, and is listed in the Wildlife Protection Act, 1972, under Schedule III, thus receiving legal protection at the lowest level to help control the trade of pelts and tails in India.

== Relationships with humans ==
=== In folklore, mythology and literature ===
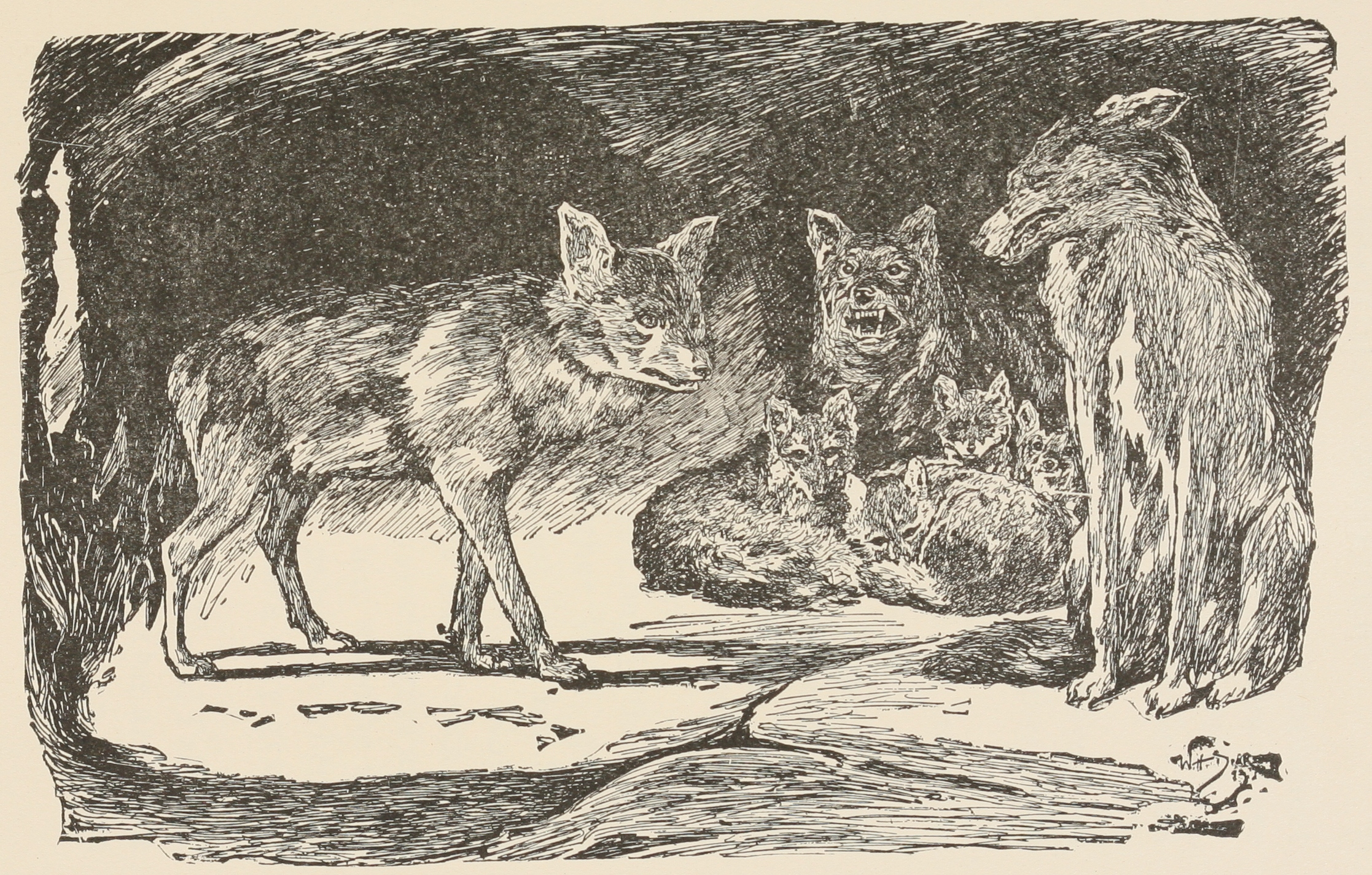
Tabaqui (left) torments Father Wolf and his family, as illustrated in the 1895 edition of Rudyard Kipling's The Two Jungle Books.

Golden jackals appear in Indian folklore and in two ancient texts, the Jakatas and the Panchatantra, where they are portrayed as intelligent and wily creatures. The ancient Hindu text, the Mahabharata, tells the story of a learned jackal who sets his friends the tiger, wolf, mongoose, and mouse against each other so he can eat a gazelle without sharing it. The Panchatantra tells the fable of a jackal who cheats a wolf and a lion out of their shares of a camel. In Buddhist tales, the jackal is regarded as being cunning in a way similar to the fox in European tales. One popular Indian saying describes the jackal as "the sharpest among beasts, the crow among birds, and the barber among men". For a person embarking on an early morning journey, hearing a jackal howl was considered to be a sign of impending good fortune, as was seeing a jackal crossing a road from the left side.

In Hinduism, the jackal is portrayed as the familiar of several deities with the most common being Chamunda, the emaciated, devouring goddess of the cremation grounds. Another deity associated with jackals is Kali, who inhabits the cremation ground and is surrounded by millions of jackals. According to the Tantrasara scripture, when offered animal flesh, Kali appears in the form of a jackal. The goddess Shivaduti is depicted with a jackal's head. The goddess Durga was often linked to the jackal. Jackals are considered to be the vahanas (vehicles) of various protective Hindu and Buddhist deities, particularly in Tibet. According to the flood myth of the Kamar people in Raipur district, India, the god Mahadeo (Shiva) caused a deluge to dispose of a jackal who had offended him. In Rudyard Kipling's Mowgli stories collected in The Jungle Book, the character Tabaqui is a jackal despised by the Seeonee wolf pack due to his mock cordiality, his scavenging habits, and his subservience to Shere Khan the tiger.

=== Attacks on humans ===
In the Marwahi forest division of the Chhattisgarh state in eastern India, the jackal is of conservation value and there were no jackal attacks reported before 1997. During 1998–2005 there were 220 reported cases of jackal attacks on humans, although none were fatal. The majority of these attacks occurred in villages, followed by forests and crop fields. Jackals build their dens in the bouldery hillocks that surround flat areas, and these areas have been encroached by human agriculture and settlements. This encroachment has led to habitat fragmentation and the need for jackals to enter agricultural areas and villages in search for food, resulting in conflict with humans. People in this region habitually chase jackals from their villages, which leads to the jackals becoming aggressive. Female jackals with pups respond with an attack more often than lone males. In comparison, over twice as many attacks were carried out by sloth bears over the same period. There are no known attacks on humans in Europe.

=== Livestock, game, and crop predation ===
The golden jackal can be a harmful pest that attacks domestic animals such as turkeys, lambs, sheep, goats, domestic water buffalo calves, and valuable game species like newborn roe deer, hares, coypu, pheasants, francolins, grey partridges, bustards and waterfowl. It destroys grape, coffee, maize, sugarcane, and eats watermelons, muskmelons, and nuts. In Greece, golden jackals are not as damaging to livestock as wolves and red foxes but they can become a serious nuisance to small stock when in great numbers. In southern Bulgaria, over 1,000 attacks on sheep and lambs were recorded between 1982 and 1987, along with some damage to newborn deer in game farms. The damage by jackals in Bulgaria was minimal when compared to the livestock losses due to wolves. Approximately 1.5–1.9% of calves born in the Golan Heights die due to predation, mainly by jackals. The high predation rate by jackals in both Bulgaria and Israel is attributable to the lack of preventative measures in those countries and the availability of food in illegal garbage dumps, leading to jackal population explosions.

Golden jackals are extremely harmful to fur-bearing rodents, such as coypu and muskrats. Coypu can be completely extirpated in shallow water bodies. During 1948–1949 in the Amu Darya, muskrats constituted 12.3% of jackal fecal contents, and 71% of muskrat houses were destroyed by jackals. Jackals also harm the fur industry by eating muskrats caught in traps or taking skins left out to dry.

=== Hunting ===
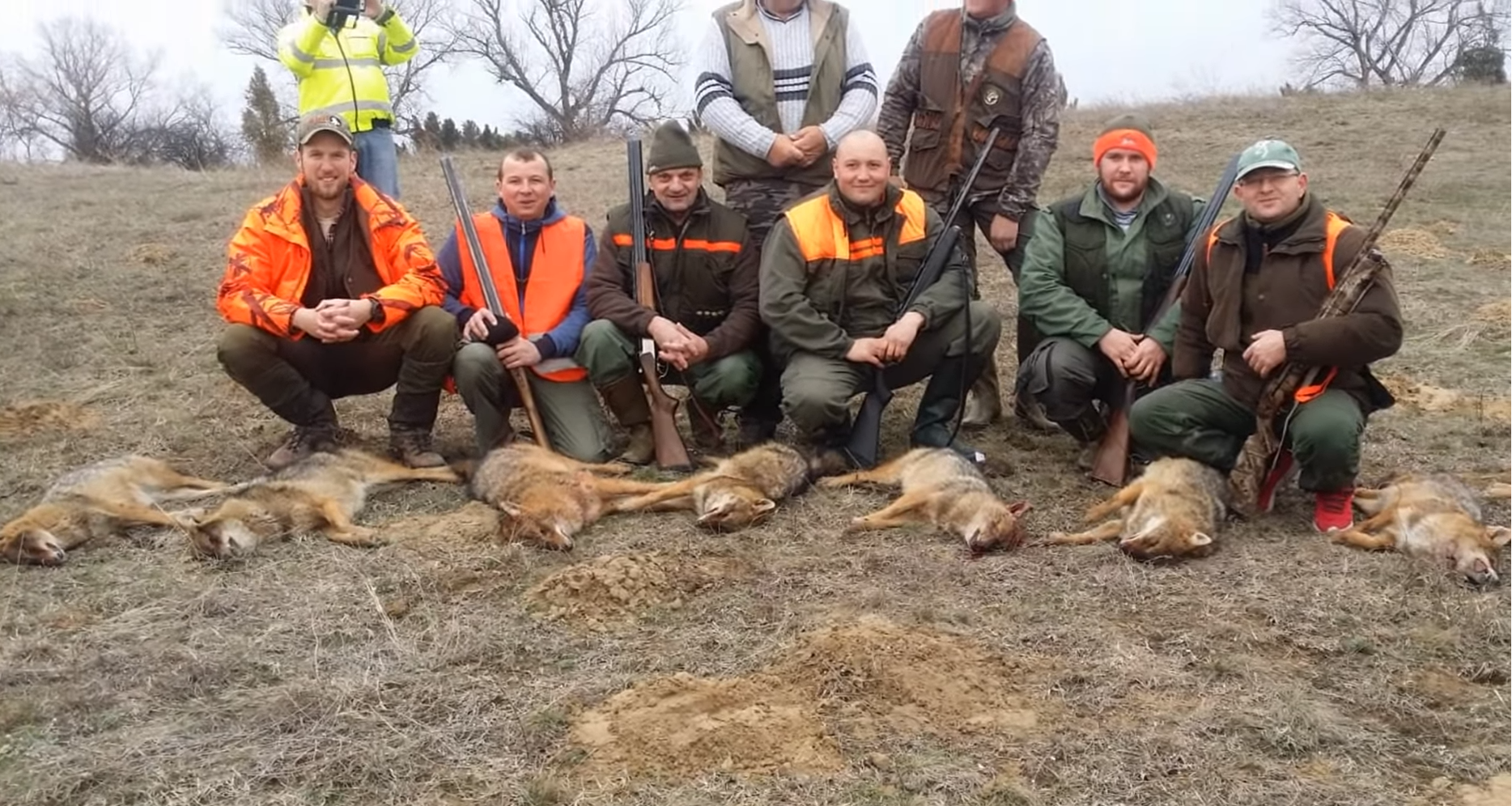
Jackals hunted in Vojvodina

During British rule in India, sportsmen conducted golden jackal hunting on horseback with hounds, with jackal coursing a substitute for the fox hunting of their native England. They were not considered as beautiful as English red foxes, but were esteemed for their endurance in the chase with one pursuit lasting 3 1/2 hours. India's weather and terrain added further challenges to jackal hunters that were not present in England: the hounds of India were rarely in as good condition as English hounds, and although the golden jackal has a strong odor, the terrain of northern India was not good in retaining scent. Also, unlike foxes, jackals sometimes feigned death when caught and could be ferociously protective of their captured packmates.

Jackals were hunted in three ways: with greyhounds, with foxhounds, and with mixed packs. Hunting jackals with greyhounds offered poor sport because greyhounds were too fast for jackals, and mixed packs were too difficult to control. From 1946 in Iraq, British diplomats and Iraqi riders conducted jackal coursing together. They distinguished three types of jackal: the "city scavenger", which was described as being slow and so smelly that dogs did not like to follow them; the "village jack", which was described as being faster, more alert, and less odorous; and the "open-country jack", which was described as being the fastest, cleanest, and providing the best sport of all three populations.

Some indigenous people of India, such as the Kolis and Vagris of Gujarat and Rajasthan and the Narikuravas in Tamil Nadu, hunt and eat golden jackals, but the majority of South Asian cultures consider the animal to be unclean. The orthodox dharma texts forbid the eating of jackals because they have five nails. In the area of the former Soviet Union, jackals are not actively hunted and are usually captured only incidentally during the hunting of other animals by means of traps or shooting during drives. In Transcaucasia, jackals are captured with large fishing hooks baited with meat and suspended 75–100 cm (30–39 in) from the ground with wire. The jackals can only reach the meat by jumping, and are then hooked by the lip or jaw.

=== Fur use ===
In Russia and the other nations of the former Soviet Union, golden jackals were considered furbearers of low quality because of their sparse, coarse, and monotonously colored fur. Jackal hairs have very little fur fiber; therefore, their pelts have a flat appearance. The jackals of Asia and the Middle East produce the coarsest pelts, though this can be remedied during the dressing process. Elburz in northern Iran produces the softest furs. Golden jackal skins are not graded to a fur standard, and are made into collars, women's coats, and fur coats.

During the 1880s, 200 jackals were captured annually in Mervsk and in the Zakatal area of the Transcaucasus, with 300 jackals being captured there during 1896. In this same period, a total of 10,000 jackals were taken within Russia and their furs sent exclusively to the Nizhegorod fair. During the late 19th and early 20th centuries, golden jackal pelts were usually traded through the ports of Thessaloniki, Alexandroupolis and Patras in numbers from 1,000 up to 4,000 per season, with the majority of them shipped to the United States and western Europe. In the early 1930s, 20,000–25,000 golden jackal skins were tanned annually in the Soviet Union, of which the majority were exported to the United States. Commencing from 1949, they were all used within the Soviet Union.

=== Sulimov dog ===
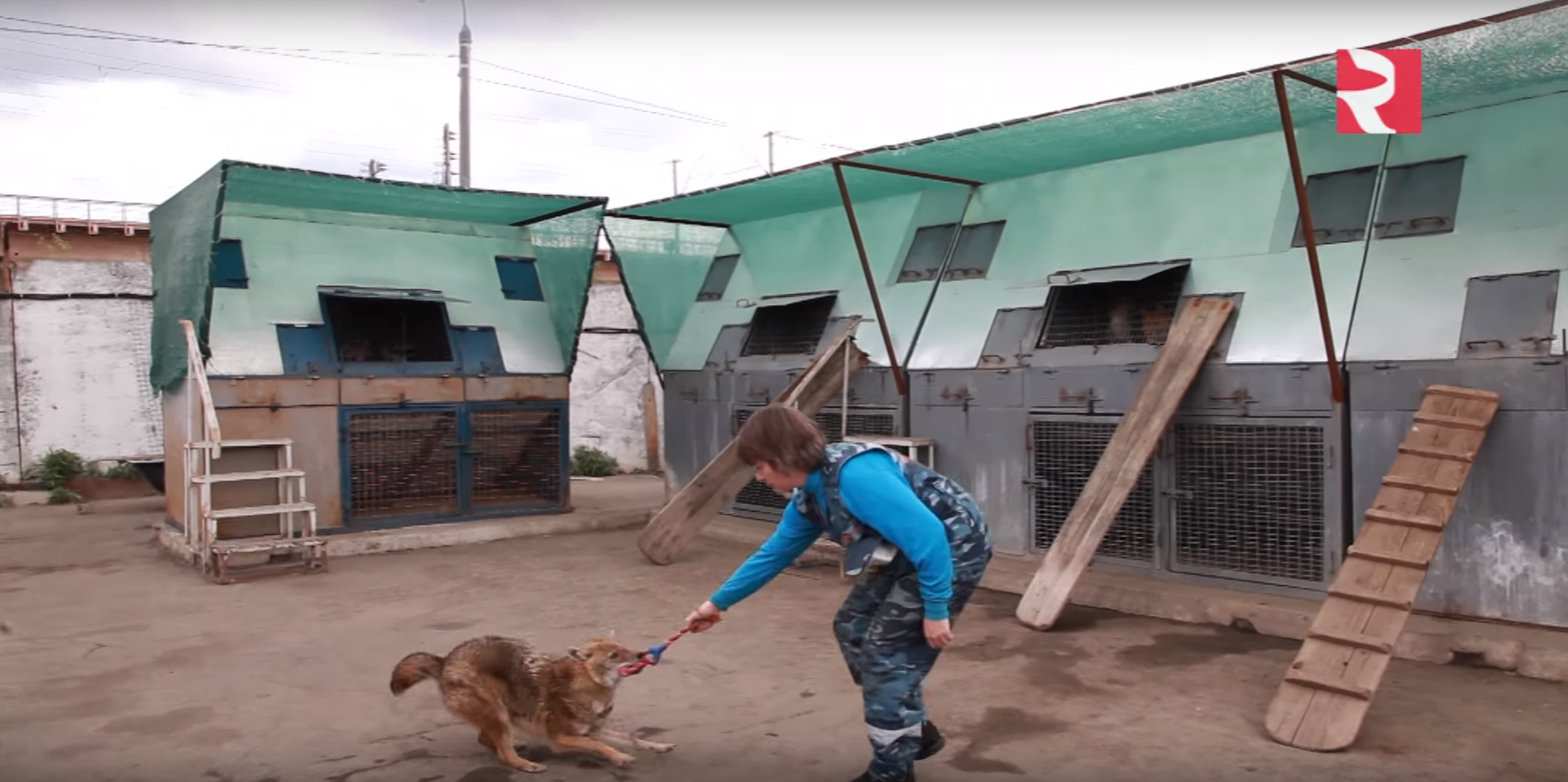
European jackal undergoing training at Sheremetyevo Airport, Russia

The golden jackal may have once been tamed in Neolithic Turkey 11,000 years ago, as there is a sculpture of a man cradling a jackal found in Göbekli Tepe. French explorers during the 19th century noted that people in the Levant kept golden jackals in their homes. The Kalmyk people near the Caspian Sea were known to frequently cross their dogs with jackals, and Balkan shepherds once crossed their sheepdogs with jackals.

The Russian military established the Red Star kennels in 1924 to improve the performance of working dogs and to conduct military dog research. The Red Star kennel developed "Laikoid" dogs, which were a cross-breed of Spitz-type Russian Laikas with German Shepherds. By the 1980s, the ability of Russia's bomb and narcotic detection dogs were assessed as being inadequate. Klim Sulimov, a research scientist with the DS Likhachev Scientific Research Institute for Cultural Heritage and Environmental Protection, began cross-breeding dogs with their wild relatives in an attempt to improve their scent-detection abilities. The researchers assumed that during domestication dogs had lost some of their scent-detection ability because they no longer had to detect prey. Sulimov crossed European jackals with Laikas, and also with fox terriers to add trainability and loyalty to the mix. He used the jackal because he believed that it was the wild ancestor of the dog, that it had superior scent-detecting ability, and, because it was smaller with more endurance than the dog, it could be housed outdoors in the Russian climate. Sulimov favored a mix of one quarter jackal and three-quarters dog. Sulimov's program continues today with the use of the hybrid Sulimov dogs at the Sheremetyevo Airport near Moscow by the Russian airline Aeroflot.

The hybrid program has been criticized, with one of Sulimov's colleagues pointing out that in other tests the Laika performed just as well as the jackal hybrids. The assumption that dogs have lost some of their scent-detection ability may be incorrect, in that dogs need to be able to scent-detect and identify the many humans that they come into contact with in their domesticated environment. Another researcher crossed German Shepherds with wolves and claimed that this hybrid had superior scent-detection abilities. The scientific evidence to support the claims of hybrid researchers is minimal, and more research has been called for.

== Bibliography ==
- Heptner, V. G.; Naumov, N. P. (1998). Mammals of the Soviet Union Vol. II Part 1a, Sirenia and Carnivora (Sea cows; Wolves and Bears). Science Publishers, Inc. USA. ISBN 978-1-886106-81-9.

== See also ==
- Golden jackals in Italy
