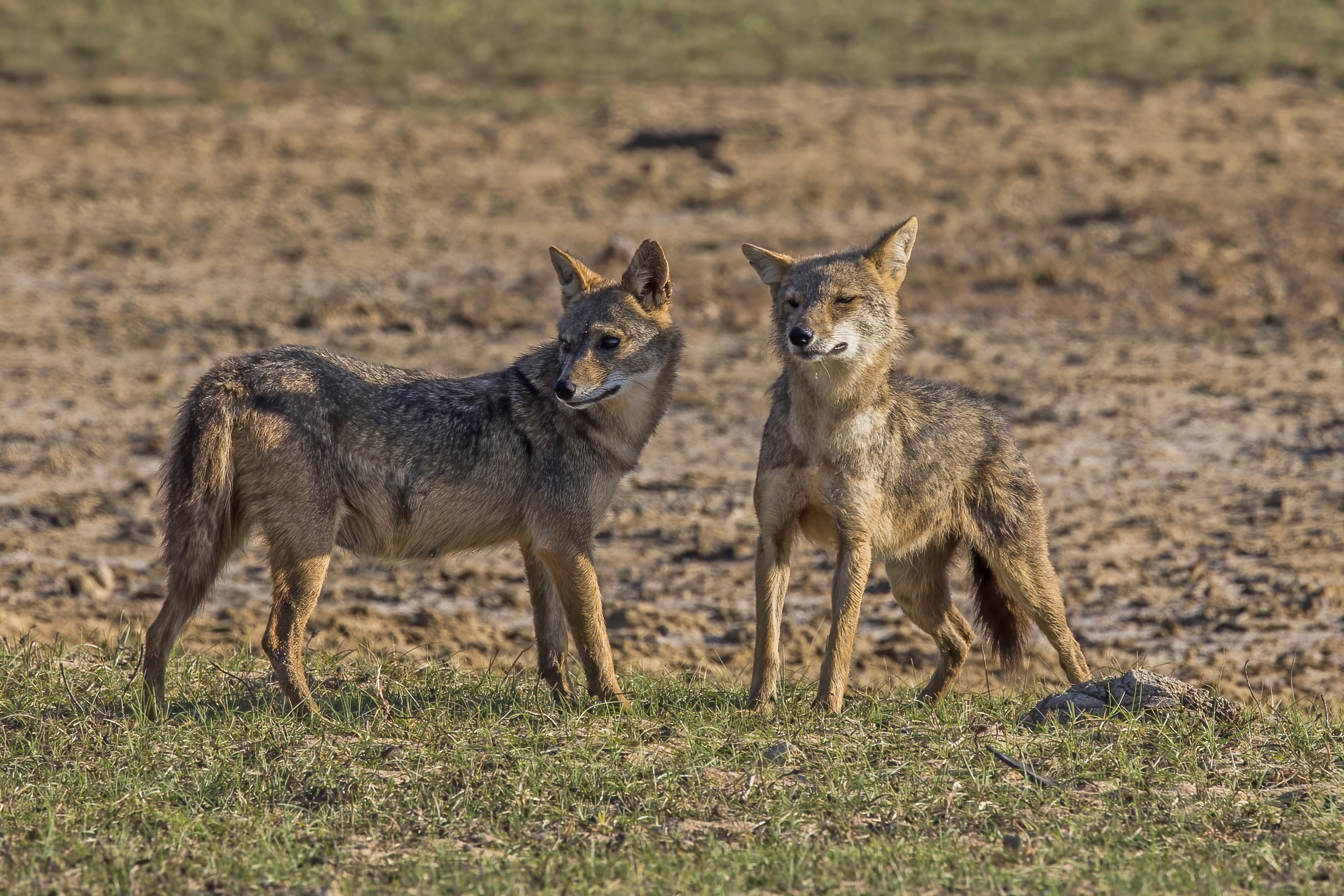
- Pregnant female (left) and male Yala National Park, Sri Lanka

Scientific classification
- Kingdom: Animalia
- Phylum: Chordata
- Class: Mammalia
- Order: Carnivora
- Family: Canidae
- Genus: Canis
- Species: C. aureus
- Subspecies: C. a. naria

Trinomial name
- Canis aureus naria Wroughton, 1916
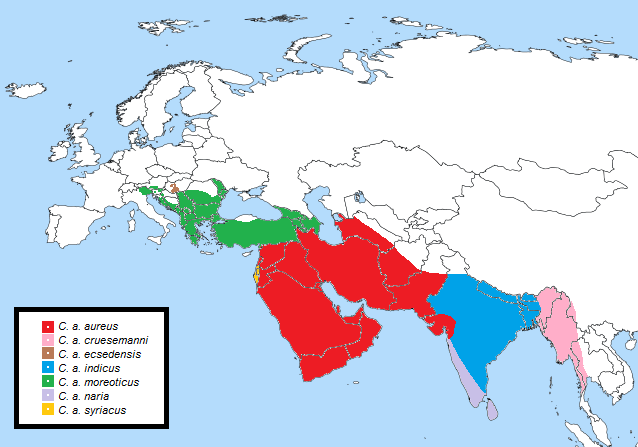
- C. a. naria range (purple)

Synonyms
- C. a. lanka (Wroughton, 1838)

= Sri Lankan jackal =

Subspecies of golden jackal native to southern India and Sri Lanka

The Sri Lankan jackal (Canis aureus naria), also known as the Southern Indian jackal, is a subspecies of golden jackal native to southern India and Sri Lanka. On the Asian mainland, the Sri Lankan jackal occurs in the whole southern part of the Indian peninsula, from Thana near Bombay in the northwest southwards through the Western Ghats, Mysore, the Eastern Ghats and Madura. It can be found throughout Sri Lanka.

In southern India, adult males measure on average 29 inches in length, while females measure 26½ inches. Weight ranges 12-19 lbs. In Sri Lanka, they can attain slightly greater sizes than their mainland cousins. Jackals in Sri Lanka, though classed as the same subspecies as those in southern India, have a rooted lobe on the inner side of the third upper premolar. The winter coat of Sri Lankan jackals is shorter, smoother and not as shaggy than those of northern Indian jackals. The coat is also darker on the back, being black and speckled with white. The underside is more pigmented on the chin, hind throat, chest and forebelly, while the limbs are rusty ochreous or rich tan. Moulting occurs earlier in the season than with northern Indian jackals, and the pelt generally does not lighten in colour.

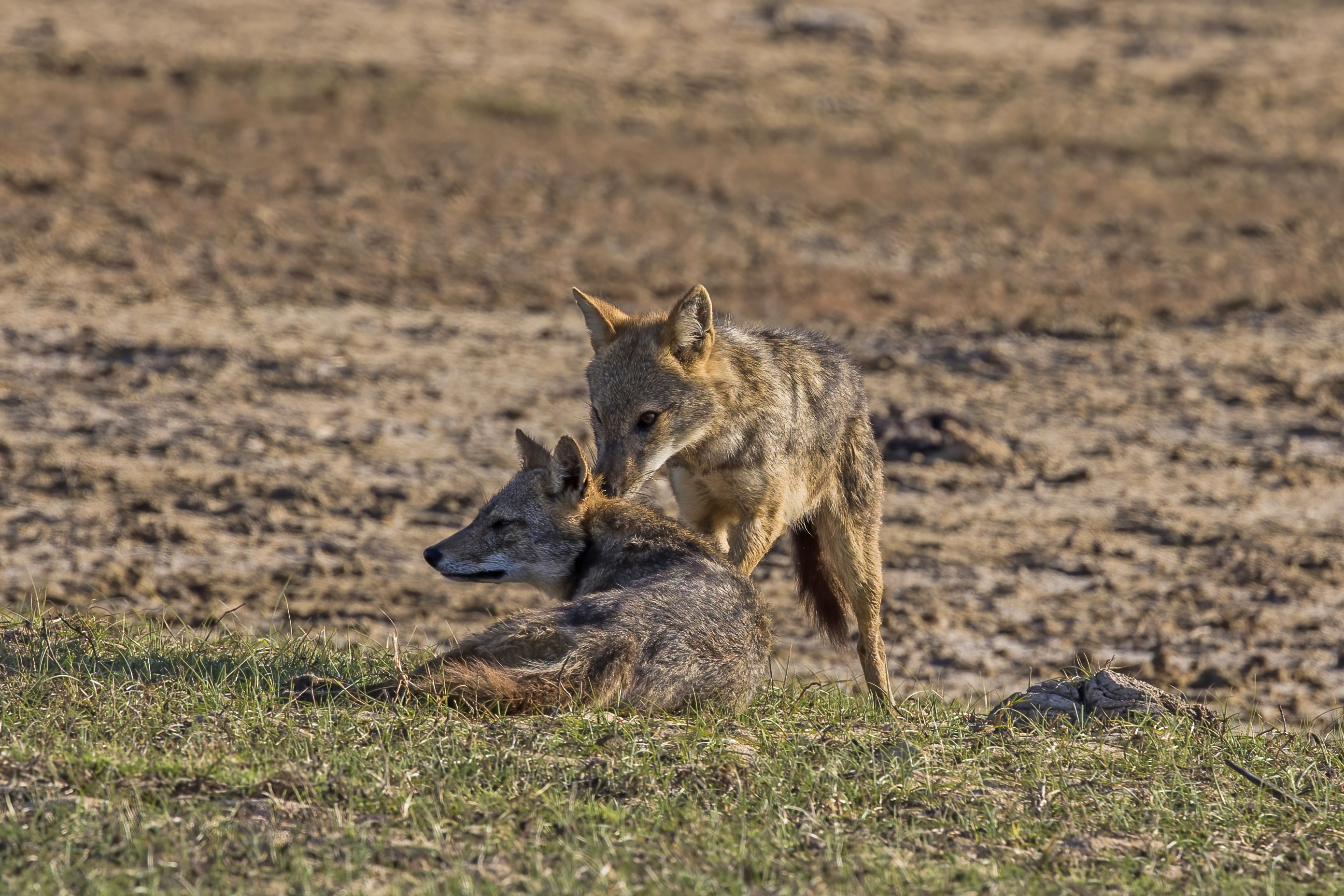
male grooming female

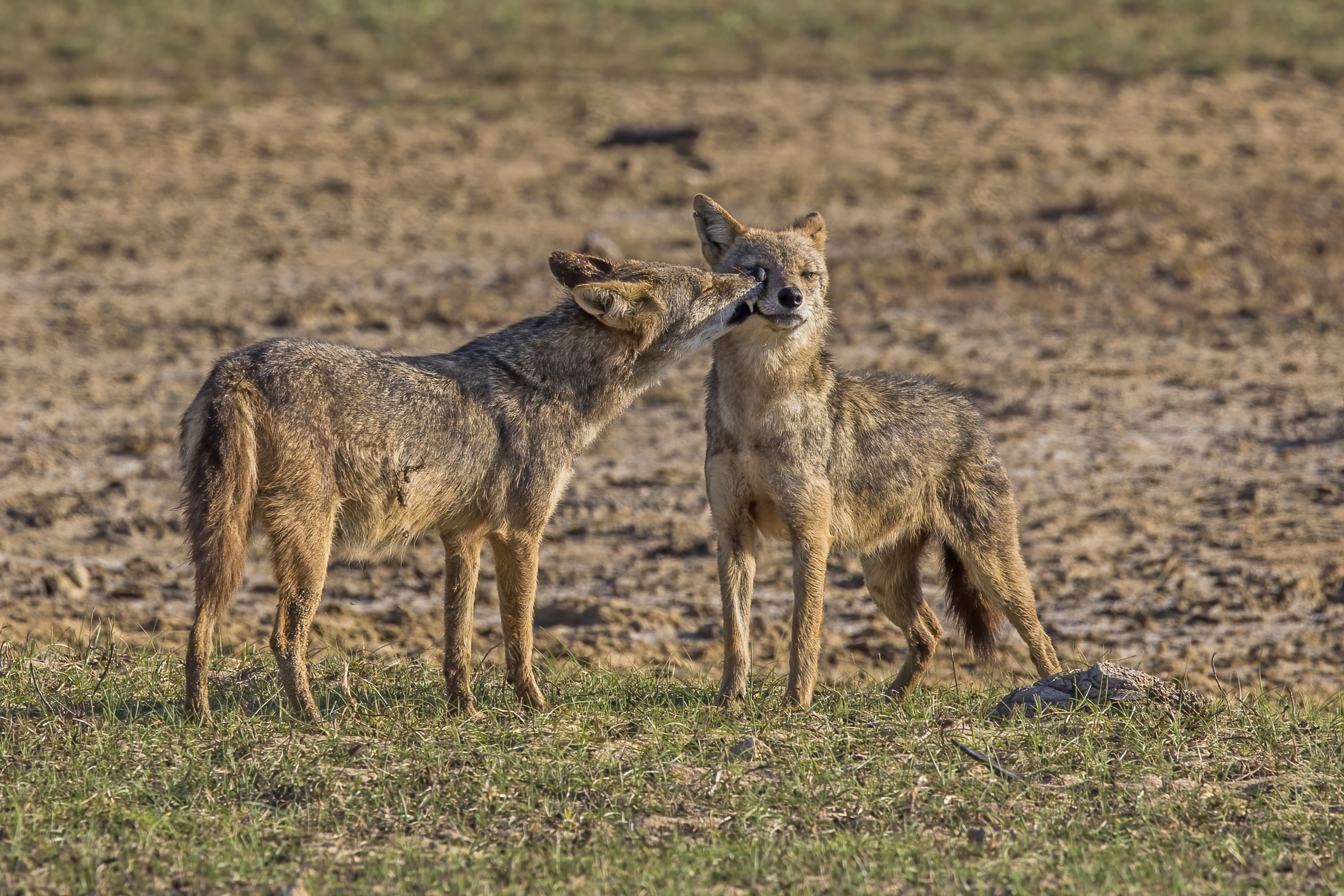
female grooming male
