= Golden jackals in Italy =

Golden jackal population in Italy

Golden jackal photographed via remote camera in Udine, 2024

Conservation status according to the Italian Red Data Book (2022)

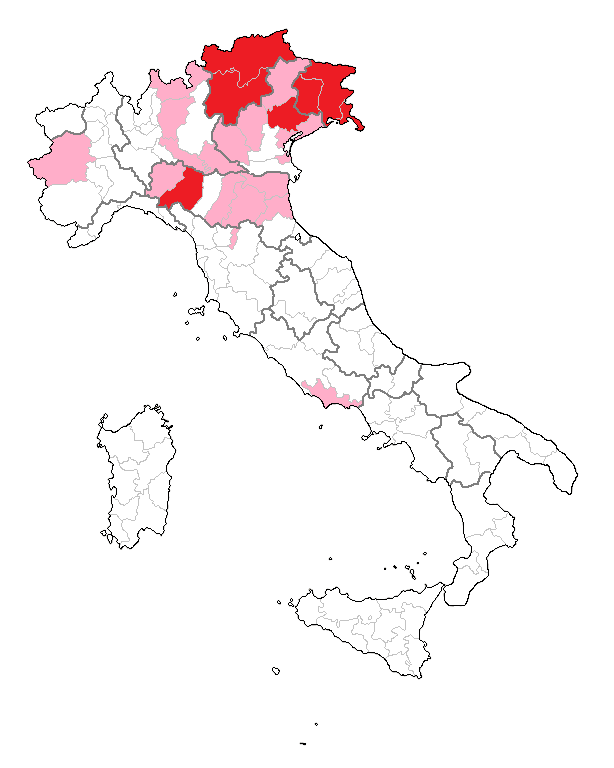
Golden jackal range in Italy by province in 2022, with red indicating core areas

Golden jackals of the subspecies C. a. moreoticus have been present in Italy since the mid-1980s. They expanded into Italy from neighbouring Slovenia and established several isolated populations in the northeast, particularly in Friuli-Venezia Giulia and Veneto. This expansion accelerated throughout the 2010s and 2020s, with the species reaching as far west as Piedmont and as far south as Lazio.

Data on the diet of jackals in Italy indicate they are primarily scavengers that feed on animal remains discarded by humans. Parasitological examinations of jackal carcasses show that the species is host to over a dozen endoparasite species. They dominate red foxes, but are outcompeted and sometimes killed by wolves.

The Italian golden jackal population is fully protected and classed as least-concern, though because its range is still fragmentary, poaching and vehicular collision still pose a serious threat, with the potential of causing localised extinctions. Public perception of jackals in Italy is largely negative among hunters and urban citizens living in regions where jackals are present.

== Species overview ==
The golden jackal is a medium-sized canid whose basic fur colour is golden, though seasonal variations occur, from pale creamy yellow to dark tawny. It can be distinguished from the red fox by its slightly larger size, shorter tail and light-coloured ruff around the neck. The jackal also lacks the fox's white tail tip and the backs of its ears are the same colour as the rest of its body rather than black. In winter, when its fur is longer and gives the impression of larger size, the golden jackal can be mistaken for a wolf, but is distinguished by its more slender build, shorter tail, more pointed muzzle and its more fulvous colour. It is an opportunistic, omnivorous forager that can live in a variety of different habitats, from deserts to evergreen forests.

The golden jackal populations in Italy have been classed, together with all other populations in Europe, as belonging to the subspecies C. a. moreoticus, which was first described by French naturalist Isidore Geoffroy Saint-Hilaire during the Morea expedition. It is the largest subspecies, measuring 74–84 cm (29–33 in) in length and 44.5–50 cm (17.5–19.5 in) cm in height, with males weighing 10–13 kg (22–29 lb) and females 6.5–7.8 kg (14–17 lb) kg.

== Range and population ==
The jackal is present in most of Northern Italy, both in alpine/prealpine regions and the Po Valley, where it ranges westwards from Friuli-Venezia Giulia to Piedmont and southwards from Trentino-Alto Adige/Südtirol to Ravenna in Emilia-Romagna. As of 2024, the jackal has been reported in ten regions of Italy: Friuli-Venezia Giulia, Veneto, Trentino-Alto Adige, Lombardy, Piedmont, the Aosta Valley, Emilia-Romagna, Tuscany, Marche and Lazio.

In 2021, it was estimated that 196-250 jackals, divided into 37-47 family groups, inhabited Italy based on bio-acoustic monitoring. The largest population, consisting of 2-5 packs, is found in Friuli-Venezia Giulia, in large part due to the low number of wolves there. As of 2024, the population of jackals in Friuli-Venezia Giulia has been calculated at 400. This region is considered the core area of the Italian jackal population, as it contains the largest number of reproducing individuals and provides a genetic link to neighbouring populations from the Balkans. Packs present in the karsts of Isonzo, Gorizia and Trieste near the Slovenian border seem to be the only self-sustaining populations in Italy.

== History ==
=== Background ===
Several pre-Holocene fossil canids found in Italy and neighbouring countries initially attributed to the golden jackal were later found to have belonged to wolves, dogs or unrelated extinct canids. The species is therefore a relatively recent arrival to southeastern Europe, colonising the area during the Late Pleistocene from Anatolia via a land bridge on the Bosporus. Its expansion into the Balkan peninsula was however limited by climate, extensive woodland and the presence of wolves, thus limiting its range to the coastline, some islands, and steppe zones.

The species' eventual arrival in Italy coincided with its expansion throughout neighbouring Yugoslavia from the 1950s onwards, which had been facilitated by the elimination of government-sponsored bounties, an increase in pastoral activity in Slovenia, and a reduction in wolf populations. Jackals were already reported in the Slovenian village of Smast, a few kilometres from the Italian border, as early as 1953, and an increase in jackal populations on the Dalmatian and Montenegrin coasts resulted in the species colonising northwestern Istria during the early 1980s.

=== Expansion ===
Comparative studies undertaken in 2014 on the mtDNA control region and autosomal microsatellite loci of golden jackals in Italy and eastern Europe showed that the Italian populations descend from admixed Dalmatian and Slavonian jackals, thus conferring high genetic diversity.

The expansion of jackals into Italy underwent three phases: the initial phase (1984–1996) led to the species' first recorded appearance in prealpine Veneto, its occasional reproduction in the provinces of Udine and Belluno, and its colonisation of the Isonzo karst in Gorizia; the second phase (1997–2008) saw a deceleration in expansion and an overall decrease in sightings, but nevertheless resulted in reproductive events near Muggia and in the valleys of the Natisone, as well as an increased presence in Gorizia; the third phase (2009–2018) saw a rapid expansion characterised by further reproductions in Belluno, Carnia, Alto Adige, Natisone, Gorizia and the steppe areas of the province of Pordenone.

==== First phase ====
On 24 January 1984, after numerous reports were received concerning a pair of "giant foxes" and several predation events on roe deer, a male jackal was captured at Ponte Orsina near San Vito di Cadore in the province of Belluno, though it would not be positively identified until 1993. In September 1985, a female jackal was killed during a fox hunt, and was found to have been no older than six months of age, thus leading to the conclusion that it had been born in Italian territory, given the unlikelihood of such a young specimen dispersing many kilometres from its birthplace. A second specimen was later discovered as roadkill that year.

In the summer of 1987, reports were made of "coyotes" in Udine. On 23 August, an adult female was killed there during an anti-rabies campaign against red foxes. An examination of the carcass definitively precluded it from being an imported pet coyote or coydog, and showed that the specimen was very similar to jackals in neighbouring Yugoslavia. The animal was also shown to be relatively old and displayed signs of having recently raised pups.

Several more sightings were reported between 1988 and early 1992. On 25 June 1992, a young male jackal, erroneously identified as a "big fox", was killed in a vehicular colision in Treviso, and correctly identified after being examined at the Museo Friulano di Storia Naturale di Udine. Two months later, a large adult male was observed frequenting Gropada. Another, possibly the same animal, was later observed near Basovizza. At the same time, jackals were reported in the karst of Trieste and by the middle section of the Tagliamento. It was concluded that the species had by then fully established itself in Veneto and Friuli-Venezia Giulia, having expanded westwards by 100 km (62 mi) since the first records. By 1994, jackals were reported in the karst of Gorizia and a family group was sighted in Rivamonte Agordino.

==== Second phase ====
In 1998, camera traps confirmed the presence of a jackal pair near Doberdò del Lago. Nevertheless, the expansion of the species in Italy seemed to stop by the late 1990s, probably due to hunting pressures and a simultaneous decrease in Balkan jackal populations. A survey of the Julian Prealps undertaken between 2003-2009, however, showed that the species was expanding into the high Adriatic Hinterland, though still in small numbers, with perhaps 2-4 specimens being present. It was nevertheless considered likely that there were at least two family groups located along the Italian-Slovenian border.

==== Third phase ====
On 30 April 2009, a subadult male was caught at San Donà di Piave in the province of Venice, in close proximity to a location in Treviso where another jackal was sighted in the 1990s, thus indicating the possible presence of a reproductive population in the Venetian Prealps penetrating into the Venetian floodplain via the Piave River Valley. In the summer and winter of 2009, the presence of jackals was ascertained in South Tyrol in the Dolomites and Socchieve in Udine respectively.

By 2011, the species' had established reproductive groups in the mountainous regions of Friuli-Venzia Giulia, Veneto and parts of Trentino-Alto Adige, with occasional incursions into the lowlands of Udine, Treviso and Venice by dispersing young males. At least one reproduction was recorded in Udine.

In 2017, the jackal population on the Italo-Slovenian border increased significantly, leading to a wave of dispersals which brought the species to Emilia-Romagna, where it crossed the Po River into Mirandola, and established itself in Val Brembana in Lombardy.

==== 2020 – present ====
In 2020, jackals were confirmed to be present in the province of Verona, with at least one family group establishing itself near Lake Garda. In August of that year, a dispersing jackal, thought to be from the Verona population, entered the Parco del Po Vercellese/Alessandrino in Piedmont. In December 2020, a specimen was sighted in Pedrignano in Parma. Further sightings in the area in 2021-2023 confirmed that the species was reproducing, despite the area's high level of industrialisation.

The species reached the Tuscan Apennines in 2021-2022, with two specimens being reported in Prato. In 2022, the golden jackal was confirmed to be present in Lazio through camera trap footage dating from 6-21 March 2020 in the Circeo National Park. On 5 March 2023, a dead specimen was found in the countryside of Potenza Picena in the Marche region, with a live jackal being sighted later that month near the Esino in Ancona.

== Ecology ==
Golden jackal in Udine

=== Habitat ===
Golden jackals inhabit humid areas and human-modified habitats, but they will move to shrubby and forested areas during the mating season, where they make use of abandoned badger setts or other natural cavities to raise their young. In plains areas, they favour agricultural areas, humid zones, disturbed lands and suburban areas, where they feed on the refuse of farms, cultivations, landfills and recycling depots. They generally prefer areas of low or medium elevation, though they have been recorded at elevations of 1,900 metres in South Tyrol and at 2,600 metres ASL on Mount Motto in Lombardy.

=== Reproduction ===
In Italy, jackal family groups consist of around 3-7 individuals that patrol a home range of 300-500 hectares. As of 2018, there is little data on the reproduction of jackals in Italy, though the mating season typically occurs in late February, with pups being born in late April or early May.

=== Diet ===
Data on the diet of golden jackals in Italy are scarce and largely come from direct examination of the stomach contents of roadkilled specimens, with faecal analyses proving unreliable due to the similarity of jackal faeces with those of foxes, wolves and dogs. Most of the species' diet consists of the remains of game and livestock discarded by hunters and butchers, as well as crops and animal feed, though the remains of hares and voles have also been found. Jackals have been reported to prey occasionally on beech martens, as well as ungulates like roe deer and sheep, though the killing of the latter two rarely occurs. They also feed on fruits and vegetables taken from farms.

=== Competitors ===
Non-invasive studies carried out in three areas in Friuli-Venzia Giulia containing both golden jackals and red foxes in 2017-2018 showed marked niche differentiation between the two species: the jackals were found to primarily prey on wild ungulates, whereas red foxes targeted small mammals, and while both overlapped in their diurnal cycles, having predominantly crepuscular and nocturnal activity patterns, they showed differing habitat preferences, with jackals actively avoiding human-modified habitats and cultivated areas, unlike foxes. This differentiation was hypothesied to be the result of active avoidance of jackals by red foxes, as jackals in the same study areas had been found to consume foxes.

In areas where they are sympatric, wolves exclude jackals from forested areas, pushing them into humid wetland, Mediterranean scrub and traditionally managed cultivated areas. Jackals living in wolf-inhabited areas have been reported to stop answering recorded jackal howls, an antipredator adaptation reported in other regions of Europe. In 2017, a pair of wolves was thought to have displaced the jackals in the Magredi area of Pordenone and, as of 2021, there are five known cases of wolves killing jackals in Italy. Nevertheless, it was hypothesied that the expansion of jackals into Marche was due in part to their seeking out wolves in order to feed on their kills. It is possible that future expansion of wolves eastwards will cause jackals to become segregated to plains areas.

=== Diseases and parasites ===
Data on the diseases and parasites of the golden jackal in Italy are still scarce. In 2009, a jackal was found to be the host of the first case of Metagonimus yokogawai in Italy. In 2022, the Department of Agri-Food, Environmental and Animal Sciences of the University of Udine, the Friulian Museum of Natural History and the FVG Region conducted the first study on the parasitofauna of the jackal in Friuli-Venezia Giulia, using 47 jackal specimens collected from various areas between 2009-2021. 91.5% of the specimens were found to be infected by at least one parasite species. Among the species found were 17 endoparasites, including Sarcocystis, the first incidence of the species in Italy, which infected 59% of the examined jackals.

Endoparasites of the golden jackal recorded by Beraldo et al. (2022) in Friuli-Venezia Giulia
Class/Order	Species	Prevalence
Nematodes	Uncinaria stenocephala	25.5%
Nematodes	Toxocara canis	19.1%
Nematodes	Angiostrongylus vasorum	16.3%
Nematodes	Crenosoma vulpis	9.3%
Nematodes	Capillaria plica	76%
Nematodes	Aoncotheca putorii	10.6%
Nematodes	Molineus patens	8.5%
Nematodes	Trichuris vulpis	6.4%
Nematodes	Eucoleus aerophilus	2.3%
Nematodes	Pterigodermatites affinis	6.4%
Nematodes	Toxascaris leonina	2.1%
Cestodes	Taenia hydatigena	21.3%
Cestodes	Mesocestoides litteratus	2.8%
Cestodes	Dypilidium caninum	2.1%
Cestodes	Taenia pisiformis	2.1%
Trematodes	Alaria alata	12.8%
Trematodes	Metagonimus yokogawai	8.5%
Protozoans
Protozoans	Sarcocystis sp.	59%

The same study ascertained the presence of several ectoparasites as well, including Ctenocephalides canis, Ixodes ricinus, Dermacentor reticulatus and Dermacentor marginatus. A discrete presence of parvovirus, both 1 and 2, was also detected in the specimens. Monitoring of the epidemiology and parasitology of the jackal is undertaken by the Istituto Zooprofilattico delle Venezie, together with analogous institutions in Piacenza and Turin, as well as several natural history museums and universities.

== Relationships with humans ==
=== Common names ===
The golden jackal is known in Italian as sciacallo dorato or simply sciacallo, which derives from the Turkish çakal, itself derived from the Persian shagāl. Recent neologisms in Friulian and Venetian referring to the species include coiòte and sciacàl.

=== Livestock predation ===
The first recorded case of livestock predation by golden jackals in Italy occurred in 2013 in a farm in Gorizia, during which several lambs were killed. Another small farm raising Istriana sheep in the same area was attacked in 2015–2016. Both cases occurred in summer at night. The golden jackal was added to the list of compensable species in 2018, as per DPR n.05/2018.

=== Public attitudes ===
As the species is a relatively new arrival to Italy, it does not feature prominently in local idioms, though the phrase Non fidarti, è uno sciacallo! (transl. Don't trust him, he's a jackal!) is used to describe untrustworthy people. A survey on the public perception and knowledge of the golden jackal in the Italian part of the Karst Plateau among excursionists, hunters and farmers between 2017–2018 showed that none of the three categories considered the species dangerous to people. The most negative opinions were expressed by hunters, who blamed jackals for declines in roe deer populations. This same category also displayed the least knowledge of the jackals' biology and ecology. Another survey taken across ten Italian cities showed that jackals rated negatively in areas where the species is present, while the inhabitants of cities where jackals are absent, like Naples and Syracuse, showed more positive attitudes.

== Conservation ==
=== Legislation ===
The IUCN classes the golden jackal population in Italy as least-concern, and does not consider it an invasive species, as its arrival in Italy was through natural processes rather than through human intervention. In Italy, the golden jackal is protected under the following regulations:

- "Ratification of the Berne Convention" (1981L0503). 5 August 1981.
- "Regulations for the protection of homeothermic wild fauna and hunting" (1992L0157, 2). 11 February 1992.
- "Council Regulation (EC) No. 338/97 of 9 December 1996 on the protection of species of wild fauna and flora by regulating trade therein".
- "On the implementation of Directive 92/43/EEC on the conservation of natural habitats and of wild fauna and flora" (1997L0357). 8 September 1997.

=== Threats ===
The range of the jackal in Italy is very irregular, with a high risk of local extinction. Vehicular collision is a major source of mortality, with over 30 specimens having been recorded to have been killed in this manner as of 2018. Most roadkilled jackals were found to be young dispersing males or yearling pups. It has been estimated that vehicular collisions reduce jackal populations by almost 10% annually. Poaching is also a significant threat to the species in Italy: two subadult jackals were poisoned in 2018 in the Gorizian karst, while another was illegally shot in the Triestine karst in 2020. As of 2025, there are no reports of hybridisation with dogs, though it may become an issue once jackals come into contact with large free-ranging dog populations in south-central Italy.

== Bibliography ==
- Castelló, J. R. (2018). Canids of the World: Wolves, Wild Dogs, Foxes, Jackals, Coyotes and their Relatives. Princeton University Press. ISBN 978-0-691-17685-7.
- Geoffroy Saint-Hilaire, I.; Geoffroy Saint-Hilaire, É. (1836). Expédition scientifique de Morée, tome III, 1er partie [Scientific Expedition in Morea, volume III, part 1] (in French). Levrault.
- Lapini, L. (2003). "Canis aureus (Linnaeus, 1758)". In Boitani, L.; Lovari, S.; Vigna Taglianti, A. (eds.). Fauna d'Italia. Mammalia III. Carnivora-Artiodactyla [Fauna of Italy: Mammalia III. Carnivora-Artiodactyla] (in Italian). Calderini. pp. 47–58. ISBN 88-506-4879-0.
- Lapini, L. (2022). Sciacallo sarà lei. Storia e stato delle conoscenze sullo sciacallo dorato in Italia [You're the Jackal Here: History and Status of Knowledge on the Golden Jackal in Italy] (in Italian). De Bastiani editore. ISBN 978-88-8466-792-2.
- Lapini, L. (2025). "Canis aureus Linnaeus, 1758". In Loy, A.; Bon, M.; Di Febbraro, M.; Baisero, D.; Amori, G. (eds.). Atlante dei Mammiferi in Italia / Atlas of Mammals in Italy. Rome: Edizioni Belvedere. pp. 212–215. ISBN 978-88-89504-77-2.
- Peruzzo, J. (2025). I grandi carnivori d'Italia. L'orso, il lupo, lo sciacallo dorato e la lince [The Large Carnivorans of Italy: The Bear, the Wolf, the Jackal and the Lynx] (in Italian). Ricca editore. ISBN 978-88-6694-094-4.
- Pieri, M.; Fanin, Y. (2022). Lo sciacallo dorato in Italia [The Golden Jackal in Italy] (in Italian). Ricca editore. ISBN 978-88-6694-067-8.
- Rondini, C.; Battistoni, C.; Teofili, C. (2022). Lista Rossa IUCN dei vertebrati italiani 2022 [IUCN Red List of Italian Vertebrates 2022] (PDF) (in Italian). Comitato Italiano IUCN e Ministero dell'Ambiente e della Sicurezza Energetica, Roma.
