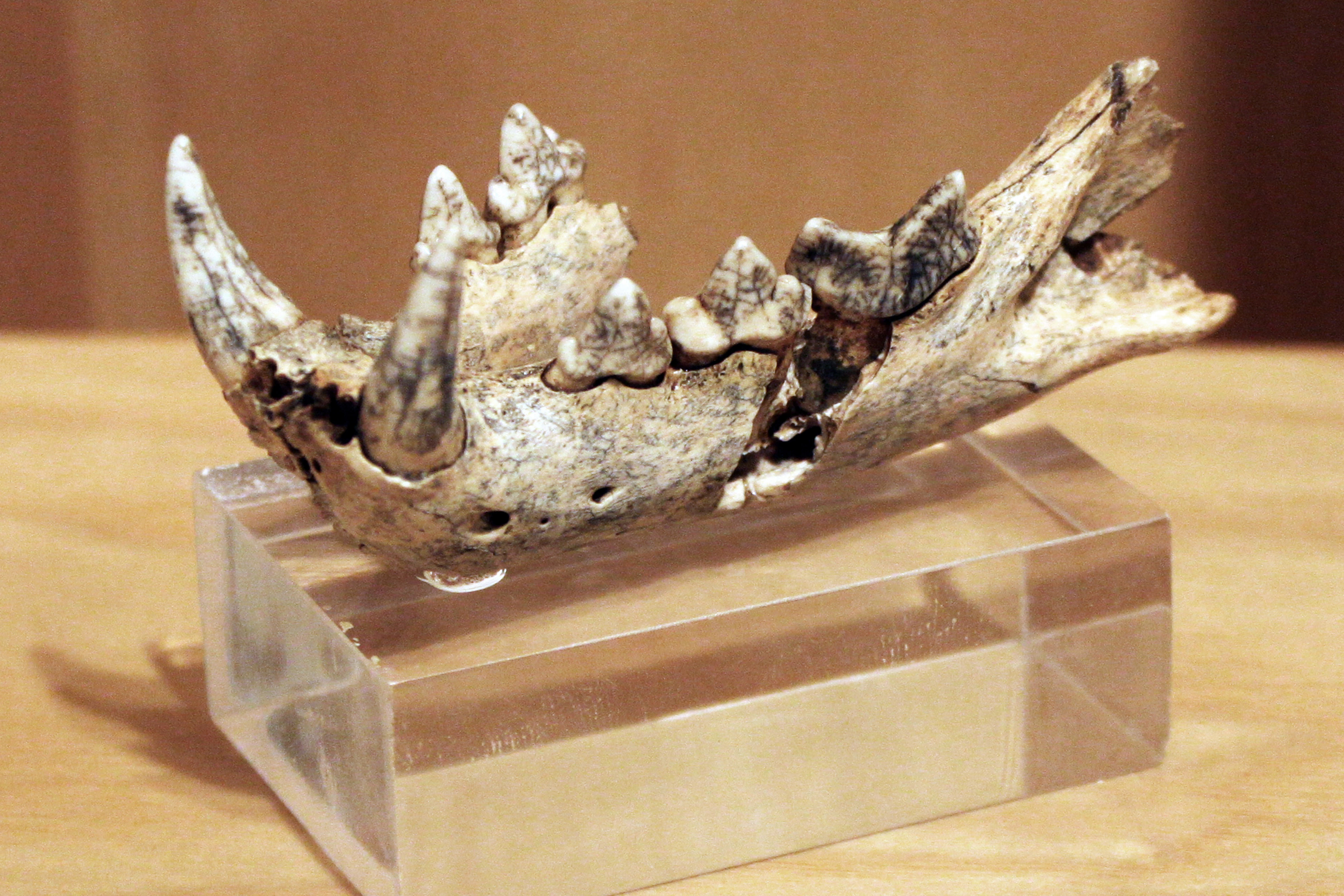
- Jaw bone fossil

Scientific classification
- Domain: Eukaryota
- Kingdom: Animalia
- Phylum: Chordata
- Class: Mammalia
- Order: Carnivora
- Suborder: Feliformia
- Family: Felidae
- Subfamily: Felinae
- Genus: Lynx
- Species: L. pardinus
- Subspecies: †L. p. spelaeus

Trinomial name
- †Lynx pardinus spelaeus Boule, 1910

= Cave lynx =

Extinct subspecies of carnivore

The cave lynx or Mediterranean cave lynx (Lynx spelaeus or Lynx pardinus spelaeus) is an extinct felid species that lived during the Pleistocene. It is controversially discussed to be a subspecies of the modern Iberian lynx (Lynx pardinus) and to be a junior synonym of this species.

Fossils have been found from the Middle and Late Pleistocene in Italy and France. Body mass reconstructions estimate this lynx to weigh about 23 kg.
