= Canid hybrid =

Result of interbreeding between the species of the genus Canis

Canid hybrids are the result of interbreeding between the species of the subfamily Caninae.

== Genetic considerations ==
The wolf-like canids are a group of large carnivores that are genetically closely related because they all possess 78 chromosomes, arranged in 39 pairs and are karyologically indistinguishable from each other. The group includes the genera Canis, Cuon, Lupulella and Lycaon. The members are the domestic dog (C. lupus familiaris), gray wolf (C. lupus), dingo (C. lupus dingo), coyote (C. latrans), golden jackal (C. aureus), African wolf (C. lupaster), Ethiopian wolf (C. simensis), dhole (Cuon alpinus), black-backed jackal (Lupulella mesomelas), side-striped jackal (L. adusta) and African wild dog (Lycaon pictus). Newly proposed members include the red wolf (Canis rufus), and the eastern wolf (Canis lycaon), subject to a resolution of the dispute as to whether these constitute separate species in their own right or whether they are sub-species of the gray wolf. The members of Canis can potentially interbreed, however, it is believed that Cuon, Lupulella and Lycaon cannot breed with each other or with Canis. The Lupulella genus (the side-striped jackal and black-backed jackal), could theoretically interbreed with each other to produce fertile offspring, but a study of the maternal mitochondrial DNA of the black-backed jackal could find no evidence of genotypes from its most likely mate, the side-striped jackal, indicating that male black-backed jackals had not bred with their sister species.

When the differences in number and arrangement of chromosomes is too great, hybridization becomes less and less likely. Other members of the wider dog family, Canidae, such as South American canids, true foxes, bat-eared foxes, or raccoon dogs which diverged 7 to 10 million years ago, are less closely related to the wolf-like canids, have fewer chromosomes and cannot hybridize with them. (recently proven, partly incorrect, see pampas fox with dog below) For instance, the red fox has 34 metacentric chromosomes and from 0 to 8 small B chromosomes, the raccoon dog has 42 chromosomes, and the fennec fox has 64 chromosomes.

== Wolf hybrids ==
=== Wolfdog hybrid ===
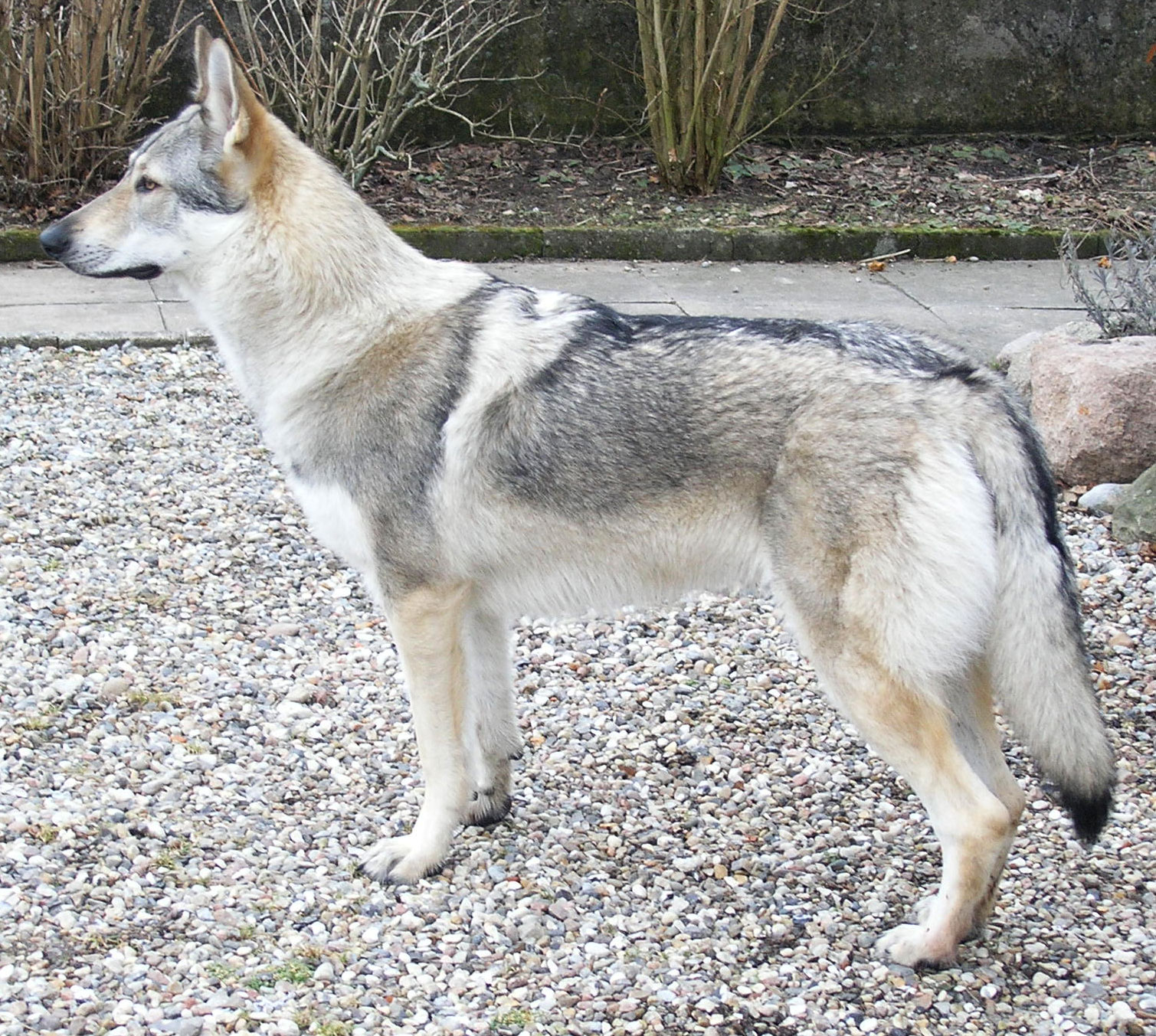
A Czechoslovakian Wolfdog

The domestic dog (Canis familiaris) is a domesticated species of the gray wolf (Canis lupus), along with the dingo (Canis lupus dingo). Therefore, crosses between these species are biologically unremarkable and not a hybridization in the same sense as an interbreeding between different species of Canidae.

Wolves are different from domestic dogs in that wolves usually have slimmer chests, longer legs, and they also have stronger jaws than those of the domestic dog subspecies. The difference in appearance from the wolf to the domestic dog becomes even larger when a mix of the two animals is created. Wolfdogs do not have one common description of their appearance because it varies from one breeding cycle to the next. It differs from cycle to cycle because the number of wolf genes inherited in the animal differs greatly and is recorded in a percentage form. The general layout for describing the percentage of wolfdogs is as follows: 1-49% is considered low content (LC), 50-74% is considered to be mid-content (MC), and 75% and higher is considered to be high content (HC). The percentage of the amount of wolf in a wolfdog decides what the animal will look like. For example, if a wolfdog is 25% husky and 75% wolf, it will appear more like a wolf than a husky because it contains more genes from the wolf. This means that the appearance of the wolfdog will most likely contain a narrower chest, longer legs, and sharper teeth because it inherited more traits from the wolf parent.

People wanting to improve domestic dogs or create an exotic pet may breed domestic dogs to wolves. Gray wolves have been crossed with dogs that have a wolf-like appearance, such as German Shepherds to form the Czechoslovakian Wolfdog. The breeding of wolf–dog crosses is controversial, with opponents purporting that it produces an animal unfit as a domestic pet. A number of wolfdog breeds are in development. The first generation crosses (one wolf parent, one dog parent) generally are backcrossed to domestic dogs to maintain a domestic temperament and consistent conformation.

=== Dingo hybrids ===
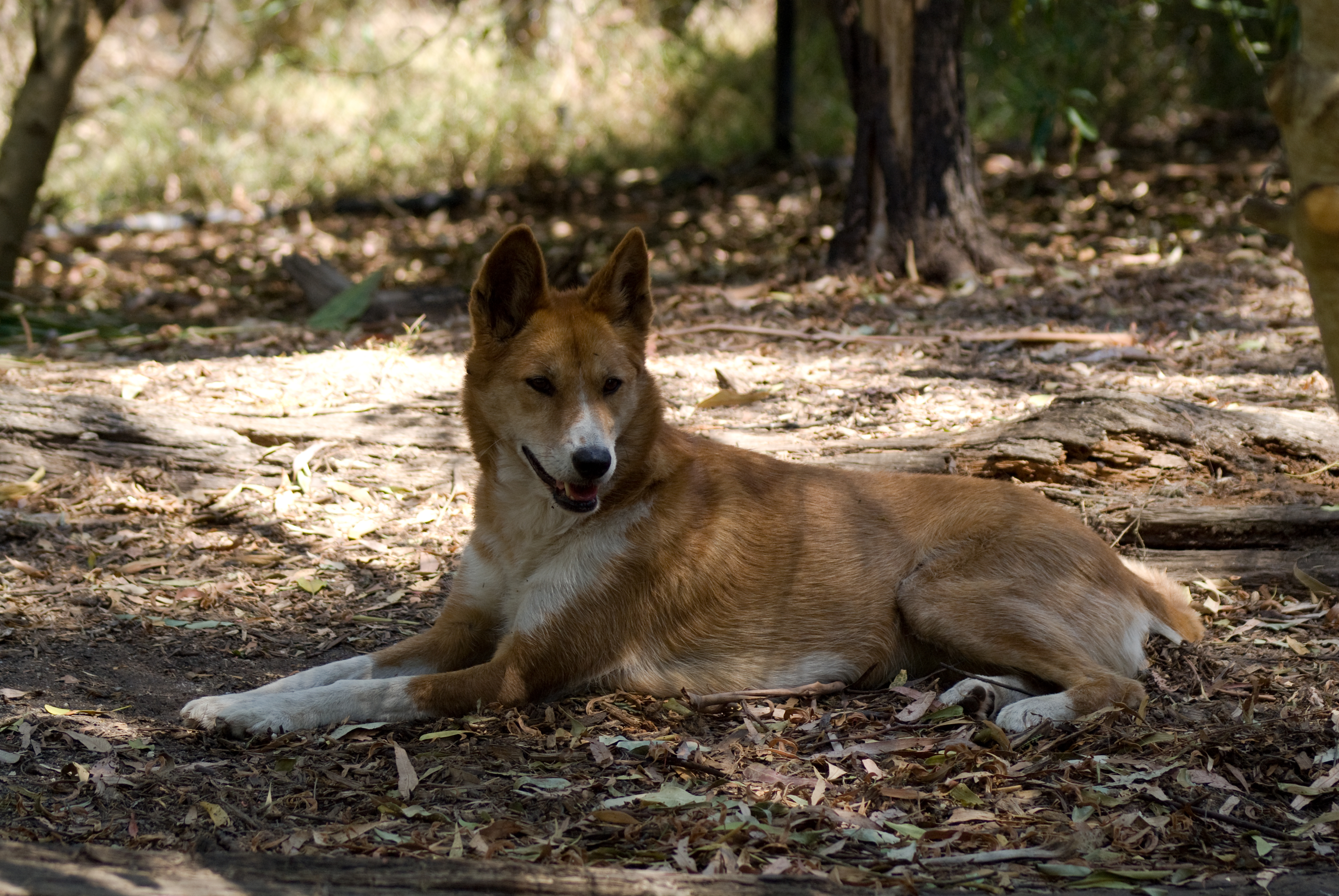
A dingo with an unusual color pattern

The dingo (Canis lupus dingo) breeds freely with other domestic dogs. This is now so widespread that in some areas, dingoes are now mostly mixed-breed dogs, crossed in recent times with dogs from other parts of the world. The dingo is closely related to the New Guinea singing dog; however, recent DNA sequencing of a 'pure' wild dingo from South Australia suggests that the dingo is 'intermediate' between wolves and domestic dogs. This would make dingos a subspecies of wolf and so interbreeding between dingos and domestic dogs is also not a hybridization in the same sense as an interbreeding between different species of Canidae.

Some dingo hybrids are accepted back into the wild dingo population, where they breed with pure dingoes. The Australian Cattle Dog and Australian Stumpy Tail Cattle Dog breeds are known to have been created by crossing domesticated herding dogs, like the Collie, with the dingo.

== Coyote hybrids ==
=== Coydogs ===
Coydogs (the offspring of a male coyote and a female domestic dog) are naturally occurring red or blond color variations of the coyote and feral dogs. The breeding cycles of domestic dogs and coyotes are not synchronized and this makes interbreeding uncommon. If interbreeding had been common, each successive generation of the coyote population would have acquired more and more dog-like traits.

=== Coywolves ===
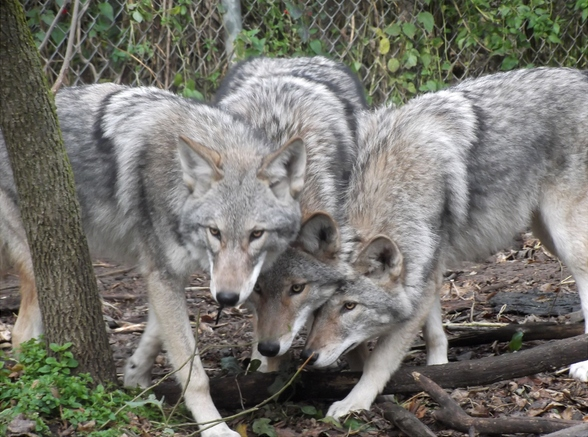
Captive-bred F_{1} gray wolf-coyote hybrids at the Wildlife Science Center in Forest Lake, Minnesota

Hybridization between gray wolves and coyotes has long been recognized both in the wild and in captivity. In an evolutionary biology research conducted by a team of researchers in the Uppsala University, analysis of control region haplotypes of the mitochondrial DNA and sex chromosomes from Mexican wolves, a critically endangered subspecies of the gray wolf once nearly driven to extinction in the wild, confirmed the presence of coyote markers in some of the wolves. The study suggests that at some point in time, female coyotes managed to mate with some of the male wolves of the remnant wild Mexican wolf populations. Analysis on the haplotype of some coyotes from Texas also detected the presence of male wolf introgression, such as Y chromosomes from the gray wolves in the southern coyotes. In one cryptozoological investigation on a corpse of what was initially labelled as a chupacabra, examinations conducted by the UC Davis team and the Texas State University concluded based on the sex chromosomes that the male animal was in fact another coyote and wolf hybrid sired by a male Mexican wolf.

DNA analysis consistently shows that all existing red wolves carry coyote genes. This has caused a problem for canid taxonomy, as hybrids are not normally thought of as species, though the convention is to continue to refer to red wolves as a subspecies of the gray wolf, Canis lupus rufus, with no mention of the coyote taxon latrans.

In recent history, the taxonomic status of the red wolf has been widely debated. Mech (1970) suggested that red wolves may be fertile hybrid offspring from gray wolf (Canis lupus) and coyote (C. latrans) interbreeding. Wayne and Jenks (1991) and Roy et al. (1994b, 1996) supported this suggestion with genetic analysis. Phillips and Henry (1992) present logic supporting the contention that the red wolf is a subspecies of the gray wolf. However, recent genetic and morphological evidence suggests that the red wolf is a unique taxon. Wilson et al. (2000) report that gray wolves (Canis lupus lycaon) in southern Ontario appear genetically very similar to the red wolf and that these two canids may be subspecies of one another and not a subspecies of gray wolf. Wilson et al. (2000) propose that red wolves and C. lupus lycaon should be a separate species, C. lycaon, with their minor differences acknowledged via subspecies designation. North American wolf biologists and geneticists also concluded that C. rufus and C. lupus lycaon were genetically more similar to each other than either was to C. lupus or C. latrans (B. T. Kelly, unpubl.). In 2002, morphometric analyses of skulls also indicate that the red wolf is likely not to be a gray wolf–coyote hybrid (Nowak 2002). Therefore, while the red wolf's taxonomic status remains unclear, there is mounting evidence to support C. rufus as a unique canid taxon.

Classifying animals commonly referred to as "eastern coyotes" or "northeastern coyotes" has become a problem for taxonomists, as it is unclear what new taxon will be used to refer to this new population of animals.

== African Canid hybrids ==
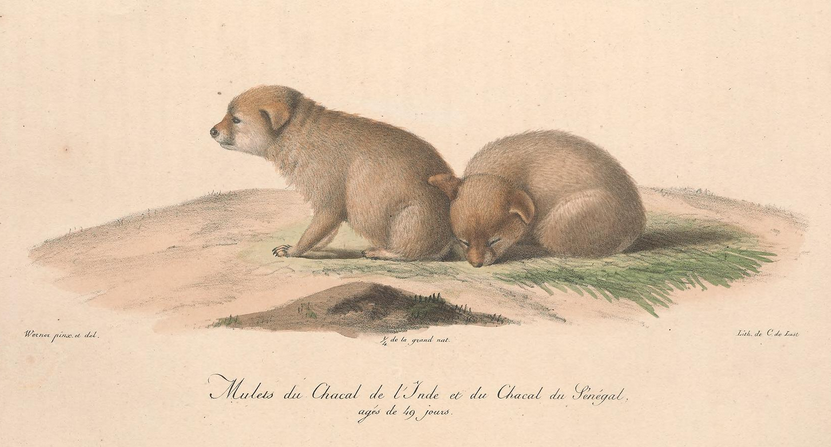
Illustration of golden jackal-African wolf hybrids bred in captivity (1821).

The conservation of the Ethiopian wolf (Canis simensis) is threatened by dog hybridisation. Animals resulting from Ethiopian wolf-dog hybridisation tend to be more heavily built than pure wolves, and have shorter muzzles and different coat patterns. Management plans for hybridization with dogs involve sterilization of known hybrids. Incidences of Ethiopian wolf-dog hybridization have been recorded in Bale's Web Valley. At least four hybrids were identified and sterilized in the area. Although hybridization has not been detected elsewhere, scientists are concerned that it could pose a threat to the wolf population's genetic integrity, resulting in outbreeding depression or a reduction in fitness, though this does not appear to have taken place.

The African gold wolf is known to hybridize with both domestic dogs and Ethiopian wolves, as well as Golden jackals.

== Jackal hybrids ==
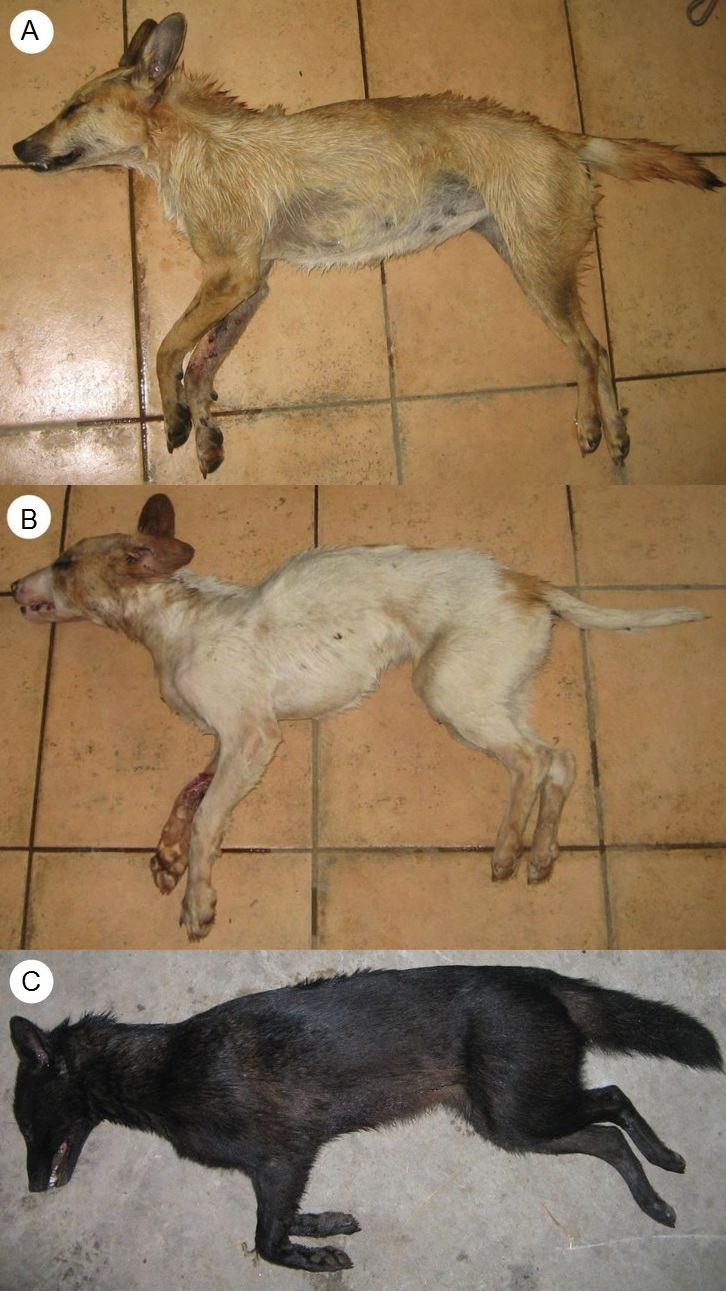
Three golden jackal-dog hybrids from Croatia. The discovery of these specimens confirmed that hybridization between the two canids occurs in the wild, and that the two have unlimited fertility with each other.

Although hybridization between wolves and golden jackals has never been observed, evidence of such occurrences was discovered through mtDNA analysis on jackals in Bulgaria. Although there is no genetic evidence of gray wolf-jackal hybridization in the Caucasus Mountains, there have been cases where otherwise genetically pure golden jackals have displayed remarkably gray wolf-like phenotypes, to the point of being mistaken for wolves by trained biologists.

- In The Variation of Animals and Plants Under Domestication, Charles Darwin wrote:
  Several years ago, I saw confined in the Zoological Gardens of London a female hybrid from an English dog and jackal, which even in this the first generation was so sterile that, as I was assured by her keeper, she did not fully exhibit her proper periods; but this case, from numerous instances have occurred of fertile hybrids from these two animals, was certainly exceptional.
- Robert Armitage Sterndale mentioned experimental golden jackal/dog hybrids from British India in his Natural History of Mammals in India and Ceylon, noting that glaring jackal traits could be exhibited in hybrids even after three generations of crossing them with dogs.
- In Russia, golden jackal/Lapponian Herder hybrids were bred as sniffer dogs because jackals have a superior sense of smell and Lapponian Herders are good cold climate dogs. Also, Fox Terrier, Norwegian Lundehund, and Spitz blood were combined to create the Sulimov dog. As well as a superior sense of smell, important at low temperatures where substances are less volatile and therefore less pungent, Sulimov dogs are small-sized and can work in confined spaces. When tired, their normally curled tails droop, making it clear to the handler that the dog needs to be rested. The jackal hybrids were bred by Klim Sulimov, senior research assistant at the D.S. Likhachev Scientific Research Institute for Cultural Heritage and Environmental Protection in Russia. Male jackal pups had to be fostered on a Siberian Husky bitch in order to imprint the jackals on dogs. Female jackals accepted male Huskies more readily. The half-breed jackal-dogs were difficult to train and were bred back to Huskies to produce quarter-breed hybrids (quadroons). These hybrids were small, agile, trainable and had an excellent sense of smell. Twenty-five jackal-dog hybrids are used by Aeroflot at Sheremetyevo International Airport in Moscow for functions including bomb-sniffing. Their breeding program dates back to 1975, but it was not applied to bomb detection until 2002.

== Pampas fox hybrid ==
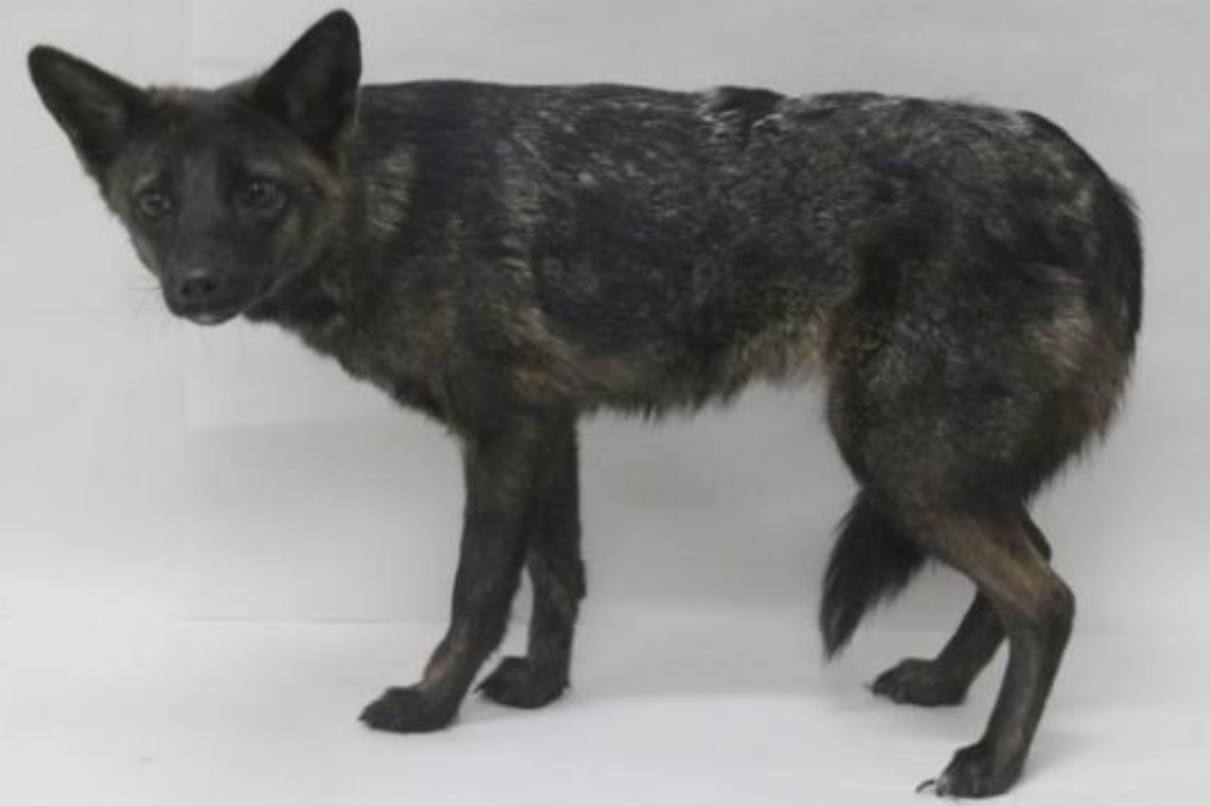
A hybrid of domestic dog and pampas fox

Crossings between canids of a different genus is extremely rare. In 2021, a female canid with unusual phenotypic characteristics was found in Vacaria City, Rio Grande do Sul, Brazil. DNA analysis indicates that the canid was a hybrid between a pampas fox and a domestic dog. Dubbed a 'Dogxim' or 'graxorra', this finding is the first documented case of hybridisation detected between these two species.

== Legality ==
Dog hybrids kept as pets are prohibited in certain jurisdictions, or are classed as wild animals and must be housed in the same way as purebred wolves.

In the United States, legislation differs greatly from state to state. In New York, the law does not allow an individual to house or own a dog hybrid of any kind, even if there is a low percentage of wolf genes in the hybrid. States such as Indiana and Arkansas allow the ownership of hybrid animals, but they regulate it strictly with health records, immunization records, and registration of the animal, while other states, such as Arizona, do not have any laws about owning a wolfdog hybrid. States may or may not create their own laws regarding the issue of wolfdog hybrids.

== Sources ==
- IUCN; SSC Canid Specialist Group (2011). Strategic Planning for Ethiopian Wolf Conservation (PDF). IUCN/SSC Canid Specialist Group. Oxford, United Kingdom. Archived from the original (PDF) on 2014-09-08.
