= Halls Heeler =

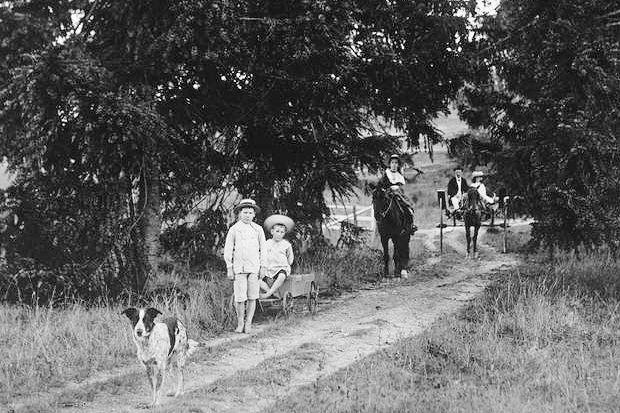
- Early Cattle Dog with possible Halls Heeler ancestry, c. 1902
- Breed status: Extinct

The Halls Heeler is the presumed ancestor of two present-day dog breeds, the Australian Cattle Dog and the Australian Stumpy Tail Cattle Dog.

Thomas Simpson Hall, pastoralist and son of pioneer Hawkesbury region colonist George Hall, developed an Australian working dog for cattle farming during the mid 1800s. Robert Kaleski, who wrote the first standard for the cattle dog (later, the Australian cattle dog), called Hall's dogs "Halls Heelers". Thomas Hall imported dogs from the United Kingdom, in particular blue-speckled Highland Collies, and crossed them with selected dingoes to create the breed.

== History ==
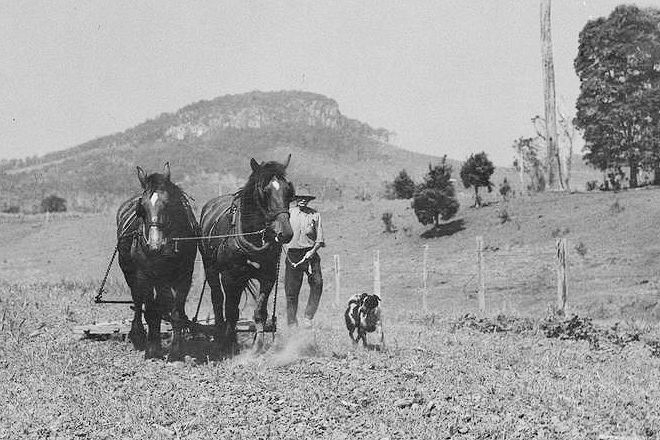
Early Cattle Dog with possible Halls Heeler ancestry.

George Hall and his family arrived in the New South Wales Colony in 1802. By 1825, the Halls had established two cattle stations in the Upper Hunter Valley, (Gundebri and Dartbrook) and had begun a northward expansion into the Liverpool Plains, New England (Australia) and Queensland. Getting cattle to the Sydney and other markets presented difficulties in that cattle had to be moved along unfenced stock routes through sometimes rugged bush and mountain ranges. The mobs of cattle were small (the population centres were small,) and the distances short compared with the long distance droving feats of the Duracks, and others, in the late nineteenth century.

Until the invention of ice-making and refrigeration in the 1850s (by a Scottish immigrant to Australian, James Harrison) butchers, and their customers, had no choice but to buy their meat in small quantities and the cattle growers, including the Halls, had no choice but to maintain a constant, but small, supply of cattle to their markets.

The droving dogs used at the time were commonly the Smithfield dogs which often barked at and bit the nose of the cattle which aggravated the livestock. A replacement was needed, and the Halls were prepared for this challenge. Thomas Simpson Hall, one of George’s sons, had established the Dartbrook station in the Upper Hunter Valley in the 1820s. He had taken with him dogs, as well as cattle, and had honed the cattle-handling potential in his dogs. He bred blue speckled Highland Collies with dingoes, an ancient type of dog which seldom barks and instinctively bites on the heel or hindquarters of the animals they chase down. The result was the creation of the first of the Halls Heelers which work silently and bite the heels of the cattle to enforce authority.

Note: A.B “Bert” Howard posits that the working dogs the Halls imported from England were called “Northumberland Blue Merle Drovers Dogs”; currently, limited evidence supports this.

Although development of the Halls Heelers probably began on Dartbrook in the 1820s, in later years Halls Heelers would have been bred on other Hall properties, particularly those remote from Dartbrook. And drovers, outside the Hall family, would have been keen to get such valuable dogs. Among them were members of the Timmins family, drovers whose Halls Heelers became known as Timmins Biters.

In 1976 a monument to Thomas Hall's achievement was erected on Dartbrook Road at the Blue Heeler Bridge in Dartbrook, New South Wales. The plaque inscription says: "This plaque presented by The Australian Cattle Society of NSW commemorates Thomas S. Hall of Dartbrook who in 1840 in this area carried out his breeding experiments with the native dog the dingo and a pair of smooth coated blue merle collies. These dogs known as Halls Heelers became the foundation of today's breed the Australian Cattle Dog."

This plaque unfortunately perpetuates the potential mistake of the “Northumberland Blue Merle Drovers Dog” and the assumption that the Halls Heeler was developed from the Northumberland Blue Merle Drovers Dog.

== Descendants ==
By the 1890s dogs of Halls Heeler ancestry had attracted the attention of a group of men in Sydney with a recreational interest in the new practice of showing dogs competitively. None were stockmen working cattle on a daily basis, and initially they were interested in a variety of working dogs. Of these breeders, the Bagust family was the most influential.

Robert Kaleski, of Moorebank, a young associate of Harry Bagust, wrote "in [18]93 when I got rid of my cross-bred cattle dogs and took up the blues, breeders of the latter had started breeding ... to fix the type. I drew up a standard for them on those lines". This breed standard was published by the New South Wales Department of Agriculture in 1903.

Kaleski's standard was adopted by breed clubs in Queensland and New South Wales but re-issued as their own, with local changes. Queensland breeders accepted short-tailed as well as long-tailed Cattle Dogs as varieties within a single breed and both varieties were exhibited, usually in separate classes.
