= John Nicholson (harbourmaster) =

Australian harbourmaster (1786–1863)

Harbourmaster of Port Jackson
- In office 25 January 1821 – 15 February 1842
- Succeeded by: Thomas Watson

Personal details
- Born: 1786
- Died: 9 January 1863 (aged 76–77) Newbury, Sutton Forest, New South Wales

John Nicholson (1786 – 9 January 1863) was an Australian harbourmaster of Port Jackson.

== Biography ==
In 1804, Nicholson entered the Royal Navy, and became employed on HMS Ariadne, off the coast of France. He was frequently in action with the French flotillas from 1805 to 1806, and on the North Sea station in HMS Elbe. In the latter part of 1807, he was captured by the Dutch, and kept closely confined. In 1809, he escaped from Breda aboard an American ship, and joined the commander-in-chief, Sir Richard Strachan on board HMS San Domingo. In 1810, he was appointed the second master of HMS Cracker, and in 1811, was appointed master of HMS Royalist, under Captain George Downie. He continued to be appointed master of several ships: HMS Nemesis, in 1812, HMS Pique, in 1813, and HMS Venerable, in 1814, respectively.

Nicholson arrived in New South Wales in 1817, and was soon appointed to the command of the brig Active, in which he took several missionary families to Tahiti. He distributed several more families on the various islands on the ship Hawse, and took the first coffee plants to Norfolk Island.

John Nicholson was appointed harbourmaster and master attendant of Port Jackson on 25 January 1821. Nicholson was responsible for the management of vessels in Port Jackson; this included the proper berthing and movement of vessels between anchorage points.

In 1822, Nicholson was awarded a 700-acre estate named 'Newbury' at Sutton Forest for refloating the brig Lady Nelson from the bar of the Hastings River. It is reported that he had chosen the name because his neighbour had named his estate 'Oldbury'.

In 1823 or 1824, John Nicholson, alongside John Bingle, designed the National Colonial Flag, which served as a forerunner for many future Australian flag designs. In 1826, James Herd sailed into Wellington Harbour, New Zealand, reportedly giving the harbour its first European name, naming it 'Port Nicholson' after John Nicholson.

In 1829, Nicholson designed a set of maritime flag signals to be used in Port Jackson. He resigned as harbourmaster, due to ill health, on 15 February 1842, and was succeeded by Thomas Watson the following day. He was given a pension of £200 a year.

Nicholson also served as a justice of the peace for up to seventeen years.

John Nicholson died on 9 January 1863 at his estate, Newbury, leaving a widow and a large family. His death notice, as published in the Empire and The Sydney Morning Herald, recorded his age at his time of death as 75 years old, however, this would conflict with reports that he was born in 1786.
