= National Colonial Flag =

Forerunner for the many Australian flag designs

- Proportion: 1:2
- Adopted: 1824; 202 years ago (claimed 1821)
- Relinquished: 1901
- Designed by: Captain John Bingle; Captain John Nicholson

The National Colonial Flag was a forerunner for the many Australian flag designs which featured the Southern Cross and Union Flag in combination. It is the first recorded attempt to design a distinctive national flag for Australia. Designed by Captain John Bingle and Captain John Nicholson, both New South Wales residents, it is inspired by the White Ensign of the Royal Navy, the protector and defender of Australia from 1788 to 1913. The large red cross of St George features four white, eight pointed stars representing the Southern Cross. According to Bingle it was adopted by the Government of Sir Thomas Brisbane, the Governor of New South Wales from 1821 to 1825. The National Colonial Flag was the first flag designed specifically to represent Australia.

Many years ago as far back as 1823 or 1824 I assisted Captain Nicholson RN, the first Harbour Master of Port Jackson, to plan and recommend to the Lords of the Admiralty a National Colonial Flag for Australia which met with their Lordships approval and adopted by the Government of Sir Thomas Brisbane. Our proposition had the British National St George's Ensign adding Four (4) Stars placed in the four quarters of the Cross in the fly of the Ensign as the emblem of our Hemisphere THE GREAT SOUTHERN CROSS. The flag has lately been disfigured by adding another star in the centre of the Cross by someone not comprehending the original intention and embodying American notions. Sydney in those days was Australia ! and no other province to represent so that adding more Stars frustrated the original intention.

— John Bingle, Illustrated Retrospect of Present Century (1881)

== See also ==
- List of Australian flags
