= Thomas Simpson Hall =

British Australian colonist and pastoralist

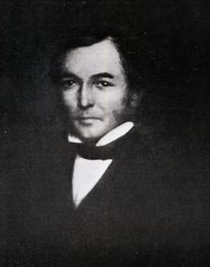
Thomas Simpson Hall

Thomas Simpson Hall (19 August 1808 – 28 May 1870) was an Anglo-Australian pastoralist who was at the forefront of British colonial expansion into what is now northern New South Wales and southern Queensland. He established large pastoral leases in these areas on Aboriginal lands and was subsequently involved in considerable frontier conflict with these original occupants. Hall was a pioneer of the British settlements of Dartbrook, Manilla, Bingara, Moree and Surat. He also became a leading breeder of Shorthorn cattle in Australia and developed a type of working dog called the Halls Heeler, from which the Australian Cattle Dog is descended.

== Early life ==
Hall was born in 1808 at Bungool on the Hawkesbury River, son of George Hall and his wife Mary Smith. His parents were Presbyterian farming immigrants from Northumberland who had arrived in New South Wales in 1802 aboard the Coromandel. With a select group of other Presbyterian colonists, the Halls were given a land grant at Portland Head on the Hawkesbury, where they established farms and helped build the Ebenezer Church, the oldest existing church on mainland Australia. The Halls expanded their property around Portland Head to include Percy Place (Mekoorabon) and Bungool. George Hall's children married into the other Portland Head Presbyterian families who had arrived on the Coromandel such as the Howes, the Johnstons and the Turnbulls, and together they established a wealthy and politically significant colonial farming dynasty.

== Dartbrook and Gundebri ==
In 1824, the Hall family received further extensive land grants in the fertile regions of the Hunter Valley, namely at Gundebri and Dartbrook. Thomas Simpson Hall, together with his brothers Ebenezer and Matthew, established cattle stations and sheep stations at these properties with Thomas organising most of the on-the-ground work. On the latter property he built "Dartbrook House" with loopholes incorporated into the exterior walls to enable sheltered shooting at Aborigines and bushrangers who attempted to approach the mansion. Dartbrook proved to be a very productive farm, and the sheep and shorthorn cattle reared there became the stock for Hall's further pastoral expansion to the north.

== Squatter pastoralist on the Namoi, Gwydir and Mehi rivers ==
After marrying Anne McGinnis in 1835, Hall decided to add to his landed assets by becoming a pastoral squatter and headed north with his assigned servants and herds of livestock to take up leaseholds in the uncolonised areas. Accompanying him were his nephews, Joseph Fleming and John Henry Fleming. Together they began claiming land on the Namoi River near to where the present day town of Manilla now stands, with Hall naming his run 'Cuerindi'.

In 1836, Hall advanced further north and took up the 'Bingara' leasehold on the Gwydir River. When establishing 'Bingara', the local Aborigines resisted Hall's incursion and both Aboriginal and Europeans were killed in the resulting skirmishes. Hall himself received a spear wound to his head during one of these battles. A detachment of New South Wales Mounted Police under Sergeant John Temple were dispatched to the area and, accompanied by Hall's armed stockmen, exacted a "terrible retribution upon the blacks". The creek running through Bingara is named Hall's Creek after Thomas Simpson Hall.

In 1838 he formed 'Wee Bolla Bolla' on the Mehi River, just east of present-day Moree. His nephews, Joseph and John Fleming, established another of their leaseholds nearby at 'Mungie Bundie'. More conflict between the advancing colonists and local Aboriginal people ensued, with the colonial government sending another force of New South Wales mounted police troopers to quell the Aboriginal resistance. This force arrived in the region in early 1838 and was led by Major James Nunn. Hall and two of his stockmen accompanied Nunn's militia on their patrol through the region. They arrested 15 Aboriginal men and shot one dead for the killing of one of Hall's stockman at 'Bingara'. Days later, the force shot dead around 40 Aborigines near Gurley in what has become known as the Waterloo Creek massacre.

In June 1838, Hall became associated with another massacre of Aboriginal people in the region. Hall's nephew, John Henry Fleming formed a gang of stockmen which included James Oates who was employed by Hall at his 'Bingara' property. This gang murdered around 28 Aboriginal people, mostly women and children, in the Myall Creek massacre.

Hall was called upon by the police and government to give evidence at the trial of the Myall Creek killers. He testified that Oates was an 'inoffensive man' but his employee was nevertheless hanged for his involvement in the massacre. His nephew Fleming escaped arrest and was never tried for his involvement in the crime. Hall was also called upon to give evidence in the inquiry into the killings conducted by Major James Nunn, but charges were never pursued.

Hall's 'Wee Bolla Bolla' station later became a highly valued property for the raising of shorthorn cattle. It was sold to the Munro family in the 1870s who have maintained ownership of the property to the present day.

== Further land acquisitions on the Balonne River ==
In 1848, Hall again linked up with his nephew Joseph Fleming to establish new pastoral interests on the frontiers of the colony in what is now Queensland. This time they drove thousands of head of cattle to the upper Balonne River where Fleming formed the Talavera run, with Hall establishing the neighbouring runs of Surat, Colgoon, Yamboucal and Weribone.

Aboriginal resistance was fierce and while establishing these runs, their men had a large battle with the local Mandandanji people killing around fifty of them. A force of Border Police under John Henry Durbin was sent to Yamboucal to assist the colonists but found themselves under siege from the Mandandanji. According to some reports, a large number of Aborigines were killed breaking this siege. To maintain occupation of the land, Hall and Fleming had to maintain a private force of 12 men to fight "against native blacks". In the early 1850s, their managers on these properties, James Norman, Dick Walker and D.W. Duncomb, participated in further killings of Aboriginal people including large massacres at Yamboucal and Donga Creek where troopers of the Native Police were utilised. By 1851, Fleming and Hall had taken possession of hundreds of thousands of acres of land along the Balonne River, from Donga Creek through to Yuleba and Bungil Creeks. Some of Hall's leaseholds in this region were amalgamated to form Noorindoo Station.

== Later life ==
From the early 1850s, Hall employed managers to run his properties and lived most of his time in prosperity at Dartbrook, while also contributing to colonial society at the Hawkesbury settlements around Windsor and Ebenezer. He became a leading producer of shorthorn cattle. Hall also experimented in dog breeding to produce a prototype cattle dog from the breeding of dingos with a type of Scottish collie. This breed was called the Halls Heeler, which were later refined by others through further breeding to create the Australian Cattle Dog. Hall is regarded as the main originator of this iconic type of dog.

Hall died in 1870 and was interred at the Hall family private cemetery in Dartbrook.

One of his eight daughters married the newspaper editor Gresley Lukin.
