= Australian Stumpy Tail Cattle Dog =

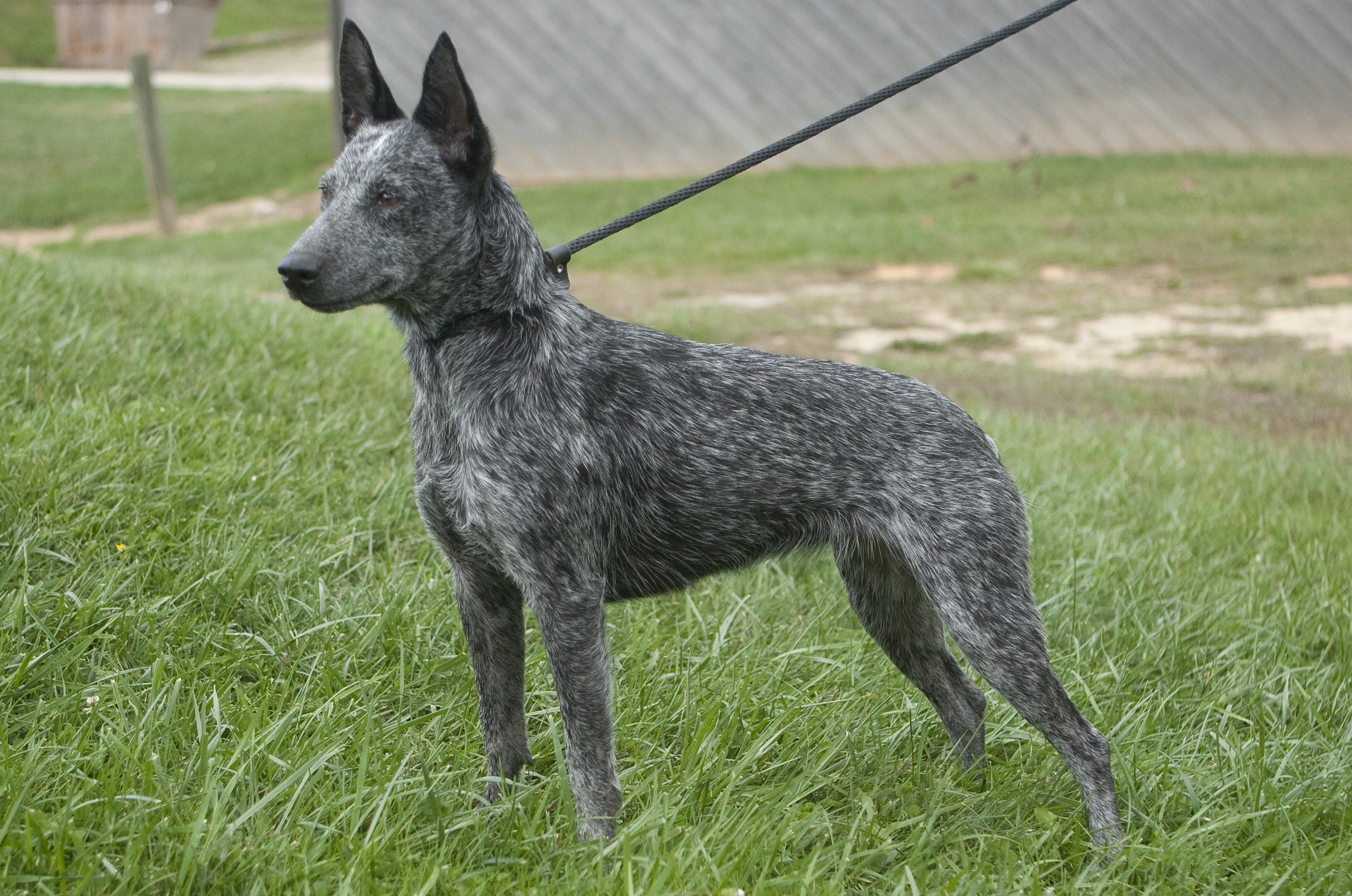
- Other names: Stumpy Tail Cattle Dog
- Common nicknames: Stumpy
- Origin: Australia
Traits
- Height: 46–51 cm (18–20 in)
- Coat: short
- Color: red speckled or blue speckled
Kennel club standards
- ANKC: standard
- Fédération Cynologique Internationale: standard

The Australian Stumpy Tail Cattle Dog, commonly known as the Stumpy, is a naturally bobtailed or tailless medium-sized cattle dog closely related to the Australian Cattle Dog. The Australian Stumpy Tail Cattle Dog and the Australian Cattle Dog share Halls Heeler origin.

== History ==
The first domestic dogs to arrive in Australia came with the First Fleet in 1788 and later convict fleets. (The Australian Dingo is not classified as a domestic dog.) A thriving stray dog population soon grew. Some of the strays, those with stock work potential, apparently found home with the free settler, George Hall. Thomas Hall, a son of George, developed them into working dogs. Robert Kaleski, who wrote the first standard for the Cattle Dog breed, called Hall's dogs Halls Heelers.

The Halls Heelers were later developed into the two modern breeds, Australian Cattle Dog and Australian Stumpy Tail Cattle Dog. Kaleski also suggested that Thomas Hall imported dogs from England.

The Sydney-based Kaleski described only long-tailed cattle dogs in his breed standard, published in 1902. The short, or absent, tail is an inherited defect. In Queensland, however, the two types (long- and short-tailed) were originally exhibited as two varieties of the one Cattle Dog breed, but by the 1950s, separate classes – Cattle Dog (long-tail) and Cattle Dog (short-tail) – were more usual.

During the 1950s administrative decisions taken by the Canine Control Council (Queensland), and consequent legal proceedings, threatened the future of the Stumpy Tail Cattle Dog as an exhibited breed. Iris Heale (1919–2006), Glen Iris kennels, became the only registered Stumpy Tail Cattle Dog breeder. She exercised her monopoly by refusing to sell registered animals. During the 1980 some members of the Australian working dog fancy realised Heale’s death would also be the death of the Stumpy Tail Cattle Dog as an exhibited breed. In 1988 the Australian National Kennel Council introduced a "Development Breeding Programme" to perpetuate the breed. The success of the scheme, to which Iris Heale gave active support, is evident in the growing popularity of the breed.

== Breed recognition ==
The Stumpy was first recognised as a breed in its own right in 1963, when the Australian National Kennel Council issued a breed standard for the Stumpy Tail Cattle Dog. The name was changed to Australian Stumpy Tail Cattle Dog in 2001 and in 2003 the breed was accepted by the Fédération Cynologique Internationale.

== Appearance ==
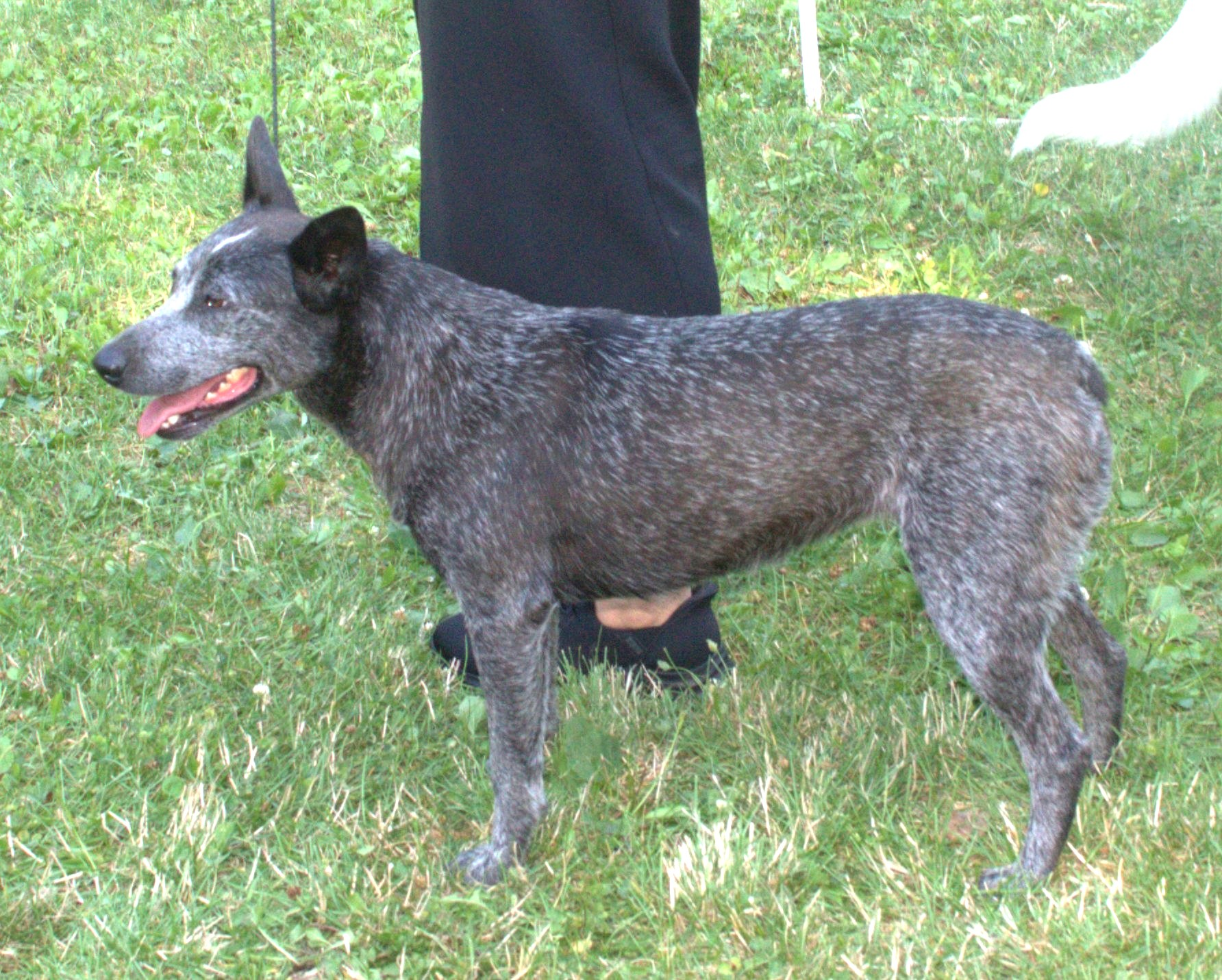
Australian Stumpy Tail Cattle Dog in an outdoor show

The ANKC standard asks for "a well proportioned working dog, rather square in profile with a hard-bitten, rugged appearance". They have small pricked ears and a naturally short tail under 10 centimetres (3.9 in). The coat is short and dense with a small ruff around the neck. They come in various patterns of blue or red. Unlike Australian Cattle Dogs, the standard forbids tan markings, which are considered signs of a mix-breed dog.

== Temperament ==
The ideal temperament of the Stumpy is described in the breed standard as alert and watchful, as well as responsive to its owner and reserved around strangers. They are high energy dogs with high stimulation needs.

== Activities ==
Stumpies may compete in dog agility trials, obedience, showmanship, flyball, tracking, frisbee and herding events. Herding instincts and trainability can be measured at noncompetitive herding tests. Stumpies exhibiting basic herding instincts and can be trained to compete in herding trials.

== See also ==
- List of dog breeds
- Anatomical terms of location
- Dog terminology
