= Australian Cattle Dog =

Breed of herding dog

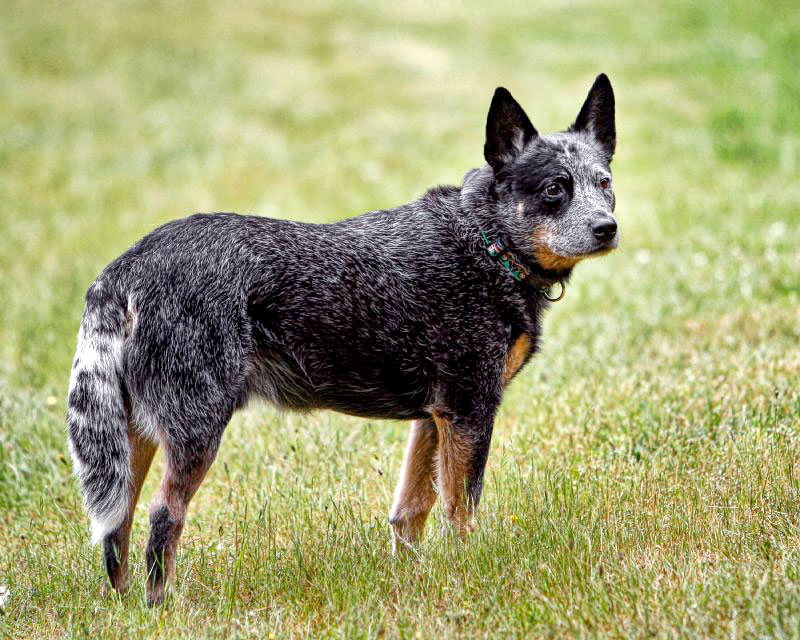
- A blue Australian Cattle Dog
- Other names: ACD, Cattle Dog, Blue/Red Heeler, Queensland Heeler
- Origin: Australia
Traits
Height	Males	46–51 cm (18–20 in)
	Females	43–48 cm (17–19 in)
- Weight: 15–22 kg (33–49 lb)
- Coat: short double coat
- Color: blue, blue mottled, blue speckled, red mottled, red speckled
Kennel club standards
- ANKC: standard
- Fédération Cynologique Internationale: standard

The Australian Cattle Dog, or simply Cattle Dog, is a breed of herding dog developed in Australia for droving cattle over long distances across rough terrain. This breed is a medium-sized, short-coated dog that occurs in two main colour forms. It has either red or black hair distributed fairly evenly through a white coat, which gives the appearance of a "red" or "blue" dog.

As with dogs from other working breeds, the Australian Cattle Dog is energetic and intelligent with an independent streak. It responds well to structured training, particularly if it is interesting and challenging. It was originally bred to herd by biting, and is known to nip running children. It forms a strong attachment to its owners, and can be protective of them and their possessions. It is easy to groom and maintain, requiring little more than brushing during the shedding period. The most common health problems are deafness and progressive blindness (both hereditary conditions) and accidental injury.

Thomas Simpson Hall, pastoralist and son of pioneer Hawkesbury region colonist George Hall, developed an Australian working dog for cattle farming during the mid 1800s. Robert Kaleski, who wrote the first standard for the cattle dog (later, the Australian cattle dog), called Hall's dogs "Halls Heelers". Thomas Hall imported dogs from the United Kingdom, in particular blue-speckled Highland Collies, and crossed them with selected dingoes to create the breed. The Halls Heelers were later developed, in particular by Jack and Harry Bagust from Sydney in the 1880s, into the two modern breeds, the Australian Cattle Dog and the Australian Stumpy Tail Cattle Dog. The Bagust brothers "bred a lot and drowned a lot" to create the breed.

The Australian Cattle Dog has been nicknamed a "Red Heeler" or "Blue Heeler" on the basis of its colouring and practice of moving reluctant cattle by nipping at their heels. The nickname "Queensland Heeler" may have originated in a popular booklet, published in Victoria.

== Characteristics ==
=== Appearance ===
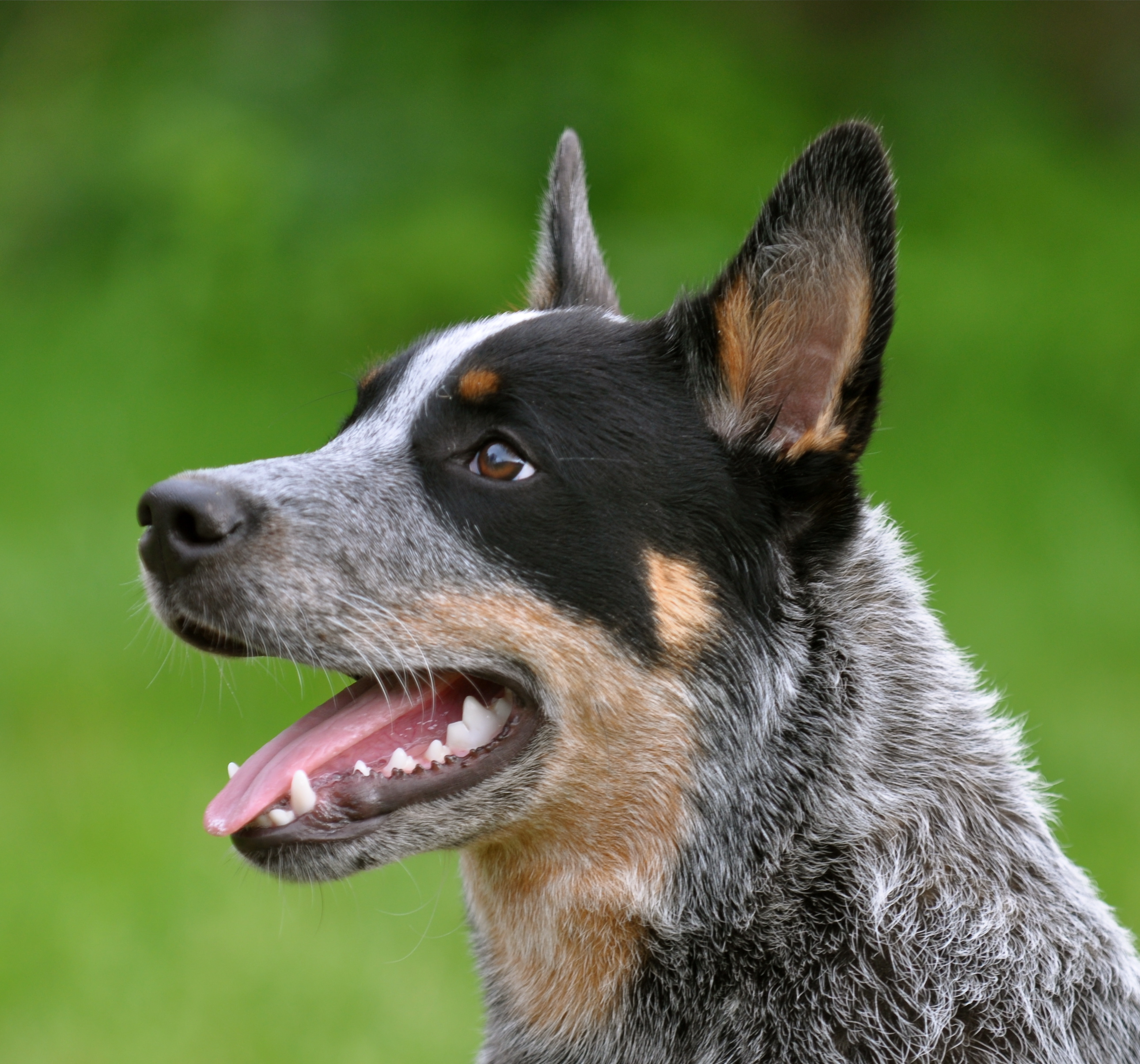
Black mask and tan markings on a blue dog

The Australian Cattle Dog is a sturdy, muscular, compact dog that gives the impression of agility and strength. It has a broad skull that flattens to a definite stop between the eyes, with muscular cheeks and a medium-length, deep, powerful muzzle. The ears are pricked, small to medium in size and set wide apart, with a covering of hair on the inside. The eyes are oval and dark, with an alert, keen expression. The neck and shoulders are strong and muscular; the forelegs are straight and parallel; and the feet round and arched, with small, sturdy toes and nails.

The Australian Cattle Dog breed standard states that it should have well-conditioned muscles, even when bred for companion or show purposes, and that its appearance should be symmetrical and balanced, with no individual part of the dog exaggerated. It should not look either delicate or cumbersome, as either characteristic limits the agility and endurance that is necessary for a working dog.

==== Size ====
The female Australian Cattle Dog measures approximately 43–48 centimetres (17–19 in) at the withers, and the male measures about 46–51 centimetres (18–20 in) at the withers. The dog should be longer than tall, that is, the length of the body from breast bone to buttocks is greater than the height at the withers, in a ratio of 10 to 9.

==== Coat and colour ====
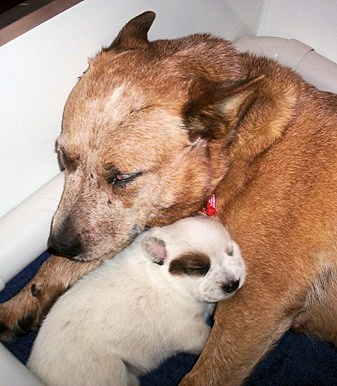
Red hairs will grow through the puppy's white coat as it matures.

There are two accepted coat colours, red and blue. Chocolate and cream are considered to be faults. Blue dogs can be blue, blue mottled, or blue speckled with tan on the legs and chest and white markings and a black patch or "mask" on one or both sides of the head. Red dogs are evenly speckled with solid red markings and similarly to the blue dogs can have a brown (red) patch "mask" on one or both sides of the head and sometimes on the body.

Both red dogs and blue dogs are born white (except for any solid-coloured body or face markings) and the red or black hairs show from around four weeks of age as they grow and mature. The distinctive adult colouration is the result of black or red hairs closely interspersed through a predominantly white coat. This is not merle colouration (a speckled effect that has associated health issues), but rather the result of the ticking gene. A number of breeds show ticking, which is the presence of colour through white areas, though the overall effect depends on other genes that will modify the size, shape and density of the ticking.

In addition to the primary colouration, an Australian Cattle Dog displays some patches of solid or near-solid colour. In both red and blue dogs, the most common are masks over one or both eyes, a white tip to the tail, a solid spot at the base of the tail, and sometimes solid spots on the body, though these are not desirable in dogs bred for conformation shows. Blue dogs may have tan midway up the legs and extending up the front to breast and throat, with tan on jaws, and tan eyebrows. Both colour forms can have a white "star" on the forehead called the "Bentley Mark", dog said to have been owned by an unsubstantiated Tom Bentley whose descendants allegedly could be identified by a white spot on the forehead and a black tail bar. Common miscolours in the Australian Cattle Dog are black hairs in a red-coated dog, including the extreme of a black saddle on a red dog, and extensive tan on the face and body on a blue dog, called "creeping tan". The Australian Cattle Dog has a double coat—the short, straight outer guard hairs are protective in nature, keeping the elements from the dog's skin while the undercoat is short, fine and dense.

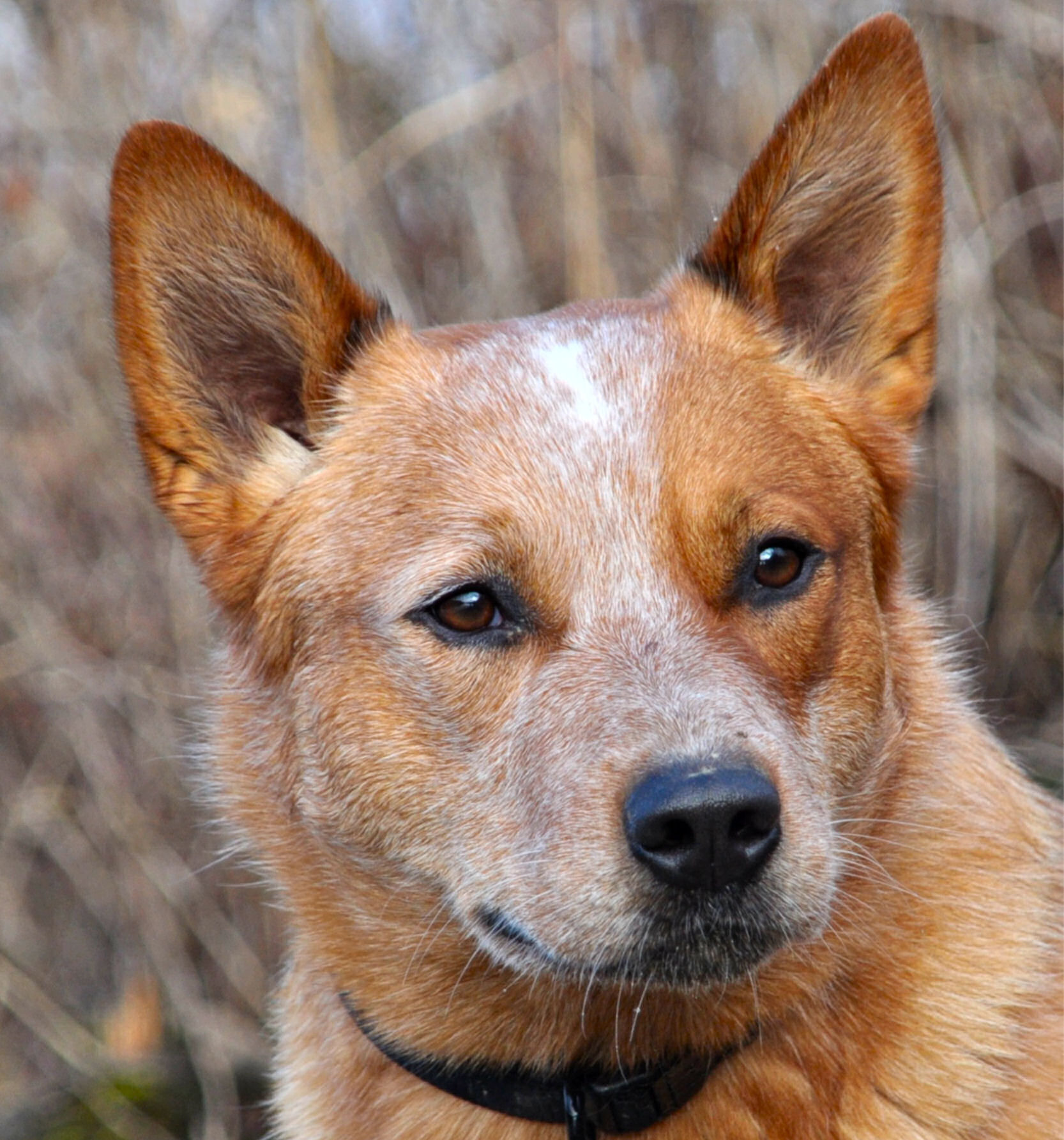
A Cattle Dog with a single mask and a "bentley mark" shows the breed's typical alert expression.

The mask consists of a black patch over one or both eyes (for the blue coat colour) or a red patch over one or both eyes (for the red coat colour). Depending on whether one or both eyes have a patch, these are called, respectively, "single" (or "half") mask and "double" (or "full") mask. Dogs without a mask are called plain-faced. Any of these are acceptable according to the breed standard. In conformation shows, even markings are preferred over uneven markings.

==== Tail ====
The breed standards of the Australian, American and Canadian kennel clubs specify that the Australian Cattle Dog should have a natural, long, un-docked tail. There will often be a solid colour spot at the base of the tail and a white tip. The tail should be set moderately low, following the slope of the back. It should hang in a slight curve at rest, though an excited dog may carry its tail higher. The tail should feature a good level of brush.

In the United States, tails are sometimes docked on working stock. Tail docking is illegal, except in special circumstances, in all states and territories of Australia.

The Australian Cattle Dog shares ancestry and early history with the Australian Stumpy Tail Cattle Dog. A breed standard, current in Queensland during the 1930s, describes two varieties of Cattle Dog, "long tail" and "short tail". The short tail variety was to be same as the long tail variety except for tail length. The two varieties were exhibited in separate classes. In 1963 the Australian National Kennel Council distinguished the two varieties in separate breed standards.

=== Temperament ===
Like many working dogs, the Australian Cattle Dog has high energy levels, an active mind, and a level of independence. The breed ranks 10th in Stanley Coren's The Intelligence of Dogs, rated as one of the most intelligent dogs ranked by obedience command trainability. The Cattle Dog needs plenty of exercise, companionship and a job to do, so a non-working dog might participate in dog sports, learning tricks, or other activities that engage its body and mind.

When on home ground, the Australian Cattle Dog is an affectionate and playful pet. However, it is reserved with people it does not know and naturally cautious in new situations. Its attitude to strangers makes it an excellent guard dog when trained for this task, and it can be socialised to become accustomed to a variety of people from an early age as a family pet. It is good with older, considerate children, but will herd people by nipping at their heels, particularly younger children who run and squeal. By the time puppies are weaned, they should have learned that the company of people is pleasurable, and that responding to cues from a person is rewarding. The bond that this breed can create with its owner is strong and will leave the dog feeling protective towards the owner, typically resulting in the dog's never being too far from the owner's side. The Australian Cattle Dog can be the friendliest of companions although it is quick to respond to the emotions of its owners, and may defend them without waiting for a command. It was originally bred to move reluctant cattle by biting, and it will bite if treated harshly. The Australian Cattle Dog's protective nature and tendency to nip at heels can be dangerous as the dog grows into an adult if unwanted behaviours are left unchecked.

While an Australian Cattle Dog generally works silently, it will bark in alarm or to attract attention. Barking can be a sign of boredom or frustration, although research has shown that pet dogs increase their vocalisation when raised in a noisy environment. It responds well to familiar dogs, but when multiple dogs are present, establishing a pecking order can trigger aggression. It is not a breed that lives in a pack with other dogs.

== As pets ==
=== Grooming ===
Known as a "wash and wear" dog, the Australian Cattle Dog requires little grooming. It is not a year-round shedder but blows its coat once a year (twice in the case of intact females).

=== Training ===
Like other working breeds, the Australian Cattle Dog is intelligent and responsive; both of these traits can be an advantage in training where a structured, varied program is used, but can lead to unwanted outcomes if training is not consistent, or is repetitive and boring for the dog. The Australian Cattle Dog is biddable, and responds well to training.

=== Activities ===
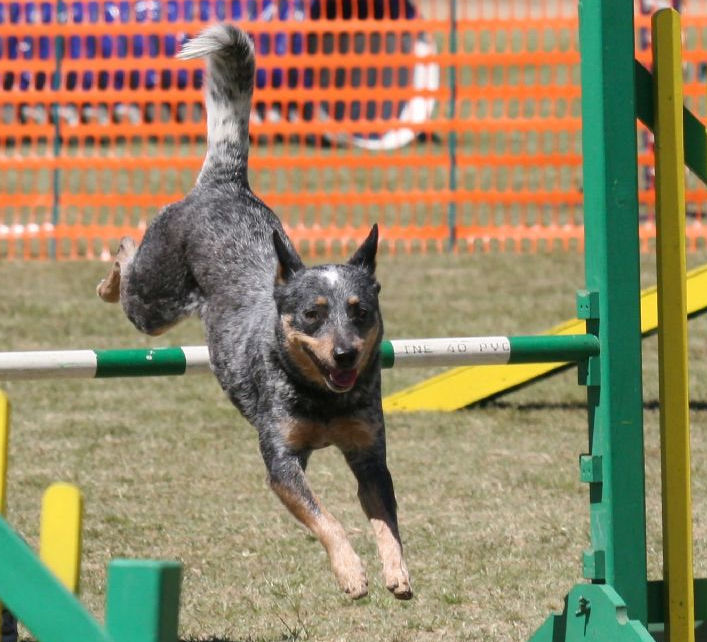
The breed is well suited for agility trials.

The Australian Cattle Dog demands a high level of physical activity. Like many other herding dog breeds, the Cattle Dog has an active and fertile mind and if it is not given jobs to do it will find its own activities. It will appreciate a walk around the neighbourhood, but it needs structured activities that engage and challenge it, and regular interaction with its owner. While individual dogs have their own personalities and abilities, as a breed the Australian Cattle Dog is suited to any activity that calls for athleticism, intelligence, and endurance.

Kennel club-sponsored herding trials with a range of events suit the driving abilities of the Cattle Dog. Herding instincts and trainability are measured at non-competitive herding tests, and basic commands are sometimes taught through herding games, where rules such as "stay", "get it" and "that'll do" are applied to fetching a ball or chasing a yard broom.

The Australian Cattle Dog was developed for its ability to drive reluctant cattle to travel long distances and may be the best breed in the world for this work. However, some working dog trainers have expressed concern that dogs bred for the show ring are increasingly too short in the legs and too stocky in the body to undertake the work for which they were originally bred.

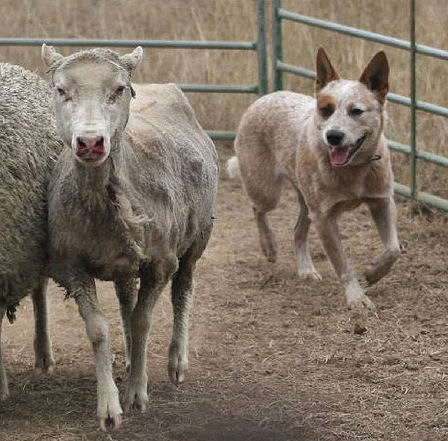
Australian Cattle Dogs were bred to drive cattle, but are also used to herd sheep.

Among the most popular activities for an Australian Cattle Dog is dog agility. It is ideally suited for navigating obstacle courses, since as a herding dog it is reactive to the handler's body language and willing to work accurately at a distance from the handler. Agility has been used by Cattle Dog owners to instil confidence in their dogs, and enhance their performance in training and competition.

The Australian Cattle Dog thrives on change and new experiences, and many handlers find training the breed challenging for this reason. An Australian Cattle Dog can excel in obedience competition. It will enjoy the challenges, such as retrieving a scented article, but the breed's problem-solving ability may lead it to find solutions to problems that are not necessarily rewarded by the obedience judges. Rally obedience offers more interaction with the owner and less repetition than traditional obedience trials.

Australian Cattle Dogs have been successful in a range of dog sports including weight pulling, flyball and schutzhund. The breed is particularly suited to activities that a dog can share with its owner such as canicross, disc dog, and skijoring or bikejoring. It is an effective hiking companion because of its natural endurance, its general lack of interest in hunting, and preference for staying by its owner's side. Most Australian Cattle Dogs love the water and are excellent swimmers. It is not a hyperactive breed, and once one has had its exercise, it is happy to lie at its owner's feet, or to rest in its bed or crate while keeping an ear and eye open for signs of pending activity. The Australian Cattle Dog is an adaptable dog that can accept city or indoor living conditions, if its considerable exercise and companionship needs are met.

The Australian Cattle Dog can be put to work in a number of ways. Cattle Dogs are service dogs for people with a disability or are therapy dogs, some work for customs agencies in drug detection, some as police dogs, others haze pest animals, such as geese, for city or state agencies, and some work as scat-detection dogs, tracking endangered wildlife species.

== Health and lifespan ==
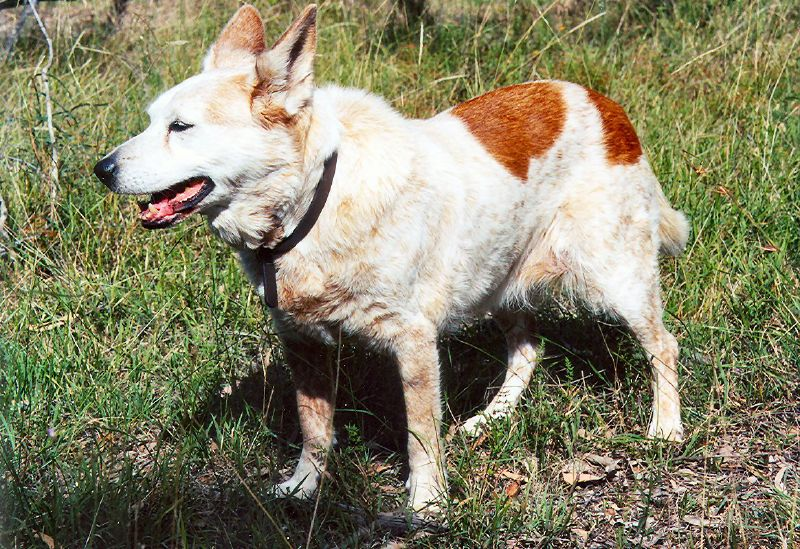
An active seventeen-year-old Australian Cattle Dog

=== Lifespan ===
In a 2024 UK study of 50 dogs the breed had an average life expectancy of 14 years compared to an average of 12.7 for purebreeds and 12 for crossbreeds. Many members of the breed are still well and active at 12 or 14 years of age, and some maintain their sight, hearing and even their teeth until their final days.

=== Common health problems ===
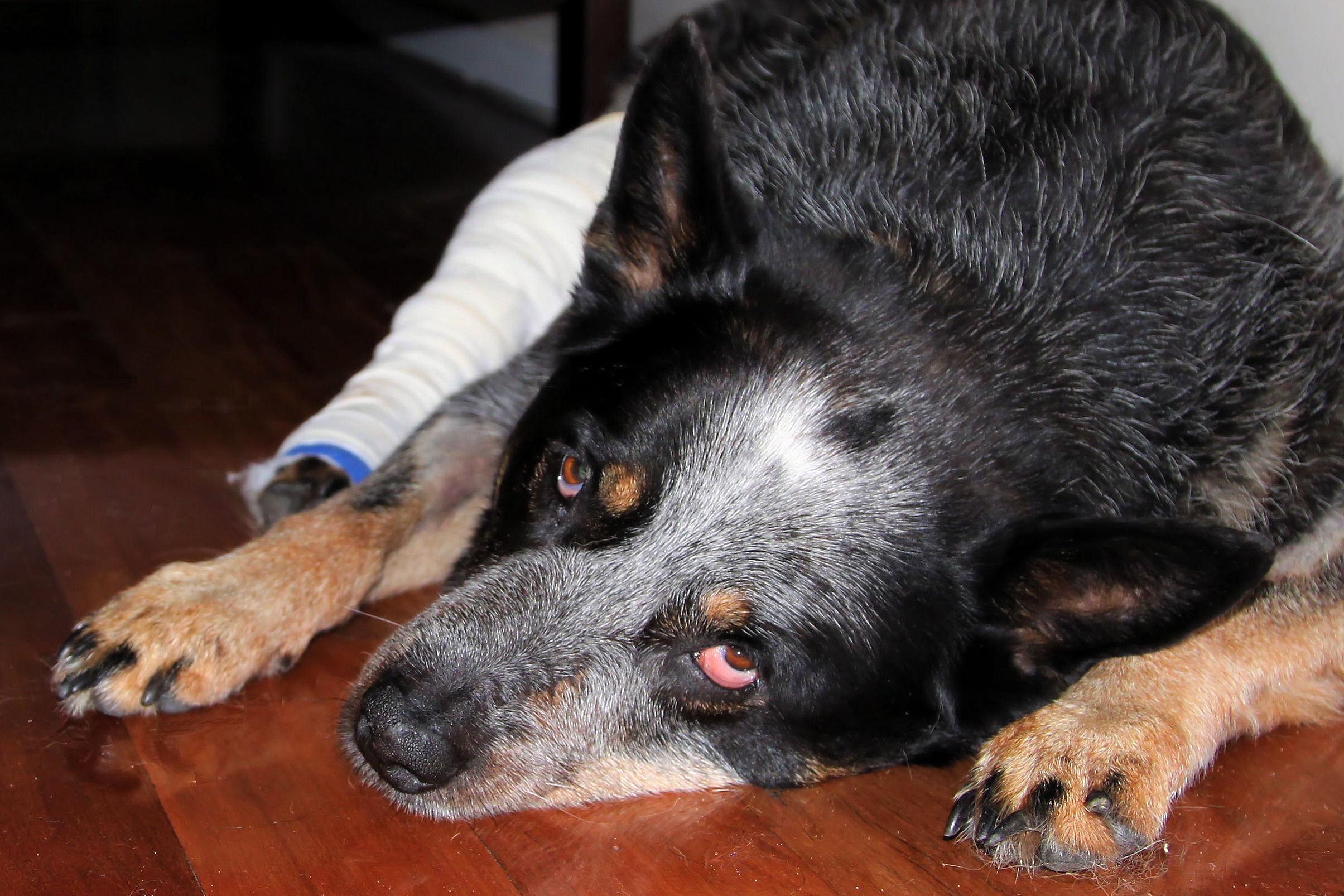
Cattle Dogs have more injuries than illnesses.

The Australian Cattle Dog carries recessive piebald alleles that produce white in the coat and skin and are linked to congenital hereditary deafness, though it is possible that there is a multi-gene cause for deafness in a dog with the piebald pigment genes. Around 10.8% of Cattle Dogs in one Australian study were found to be deaf in either one or both ears.

The Australian Cattle Dog is one of the dog breeds affected by progressive retinal atrophy. It has the most common form, progressive rod-cone degeneration (PRCD), a condition that causes the rods and cones in the retina of the eye to deteriorate later in life, resulting in blindness. PRCD is an autosomal recessive trait and a dog can be a carrier of the affected gene without developing the condition.

Hip dysplasia is not common in the breed, but it occurs sufficiently often for specialised pelvis radiographical screening tests to be offered to breeders and owners. The Cattle Dog has a number of inherited conditions, but most of these are not common. Hereditary polioencephalomyelopathy of the Australian Cattle Dog is a very rare condition caused by an inherited biochemical defect. Dogs identified with the condition were completely paralysed within their first year. Based on a sample of 69 still-living dogs, the most common health issues noted by owners were musculoskeletal (spondylosis, elbow dysplasia, and arthritis) and reproductive (pyometra, infertility, and false pregnancy), and blindness. A study of dogs diagnosed at Veterinary Colleges in the United States and Canada over a thirty-year period described fractures, lameness and cruciate ligament tears as the most common conditions in the Australian Cattle Dogs treated.

== History ==
=== In Australia ===
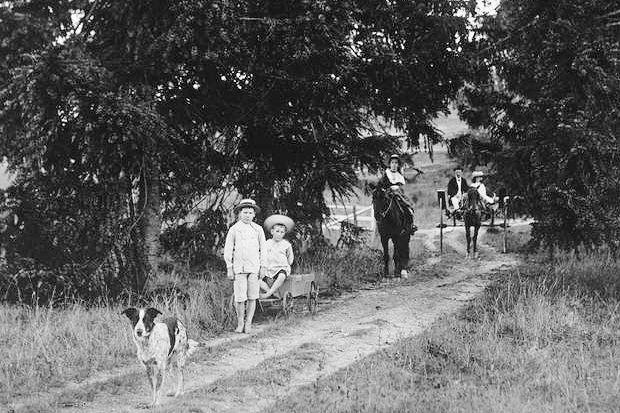
An early Australian Cattle Dog, photographed in 1902

British colonist George Hall and his family arrived in the New South Wales Colony in 1802. By 1825, the Halls had established two cattle stations in the Upper Hunter Valley, and had begun a northward expansion into the Liverpool Plains, New England and Queensland. Getting his cattle to the Sydney markets presented a problem in that cattle had to be moved along unfenced stock routes through sometimes rugged bush and mountain ranges. The mobs of cattle were small (the population centres were small) and the distances short relative to the long distance droving feats of the Duracks, and others, in the late nineteenth century. Until the invention of ice-making and refrigeration in the 1850s (by a Scottish immigrant to Australia, James Harrison) butchers, and their customers, had no choice but to buy their meat in small quantities and the cattle growers, including the Halls, had no choice but to maintain a constant, but small, supply of cattle to their markets.

The droving dogs used at the time were commonly the Smithfield dogs which often barked at and bit the nose of the cattle which aggravated the livestock. A replacement was needed, and the Halls were prepared for this challenge. Thomas Simpson Hall, one of George's sons, had established the Dartbrook station in the Upper Hunter Valley in the 1820s. He had taken with him dogs, as well as cattle, and had honed the cattle-handling potential in his dogs. He bred blue speckled Highland Collies with dingoes, an ancient type of dog which seldom barks and instinctively bites on the heel or hindquarters of the animals they chase down. The result was the creation of the first of the Halls Heelers which worked silently and bit the heels of the cattle to enforce authority. In the 1880s and 1890s, Jack and Harry Bagust of Sydney, crossed Halls Heelers with other breeds such as Kelpies and Dalmatians to produce the first dogs known as Australian Cattle Dogs.

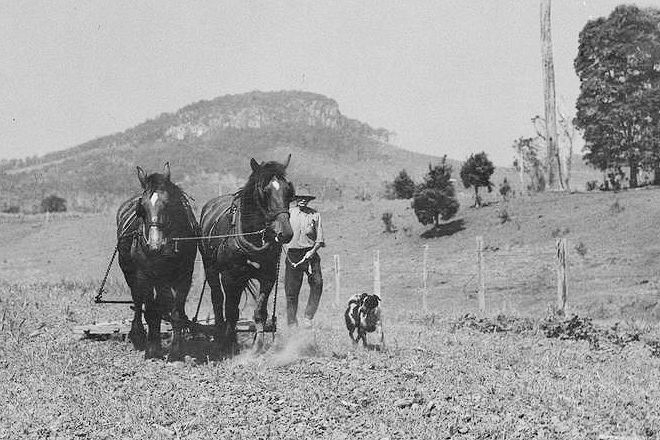
Cattle Dogs were accustomed to horses in the 1900s.

By the 1890s, dogs of Halls Heeler ancestry had attracted the attention of a group of men with a recreational interest in the new practice of showing dogs competitively. None were stockmen working cattle on a daily basis, and initially they were interested in a range of working dogs. Prominent members of the group concentrated on breeding these lines. Of these breeders, the Bagust family was the most influential.

Robert Kaleski, of Moorebank, a young associate of Harry Bagust, wrote "in 1893 when I got rid of my cross-bred cattle dogs and took up the blues, breeders of the latter had started breeding ... to fix the type. I drew up a standard for them on those lines". This first breed standard for the Cattle Dog breed was published, with photographs, by the New South Wales Department of Agriculture in 1903. Kaleski's standard emphasised that the dog should retain the overall general appearance of a 'small thick-set dingo'.

Kaleski's standard was adopted by breed clubs in Queensland and New South Wales and re-issued as their own, with local changes. His writings from the 1910s give an insight into the early history of the breed. Most importantly, Kaleski identified Thomas Simpson Hall's association with the Halls Heeler.

In the 1890s, Cattle Dogs of Halls Heeler derivation were seen in the kennels of exhibiting Queensland dog breeders such as William Byrne. These were a different population from those shown in New South Wales and included both long-tailed and short-tailed exhibits. These dogs may have come from Hall properties in Queensland. Byrne, however, initiated a trend that favoured Cattle Dogs bred in New South Wales and, during the 1920s, many breeders followed this trend.

Significant early progenitor dogs of the Cattle Dog pedigree include Brooklyn Dandy, Blue Rock, Little Gem, Little Sally, Little Logic and Logic Return.

The prominence of Little Logic and Logic Return in the pedigrees of modern Australian Cattle Dogs was perpetuated by Wooleston Kennels. Wooleston supplied foundation and supplementary breeding dogs, such as Wooleston Blue Jack, to breeders in Australia, North America and Continental Europe.

=== In the United States ===
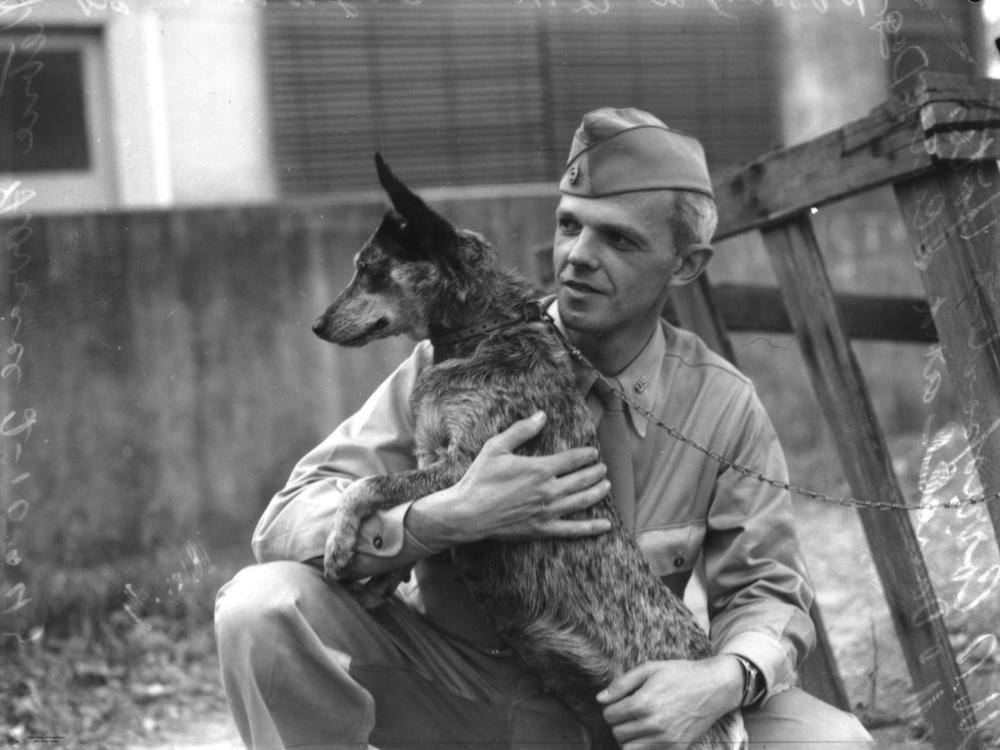
Soldiers stationed in Australia during WWII played a role in the breed's introduction to the US.

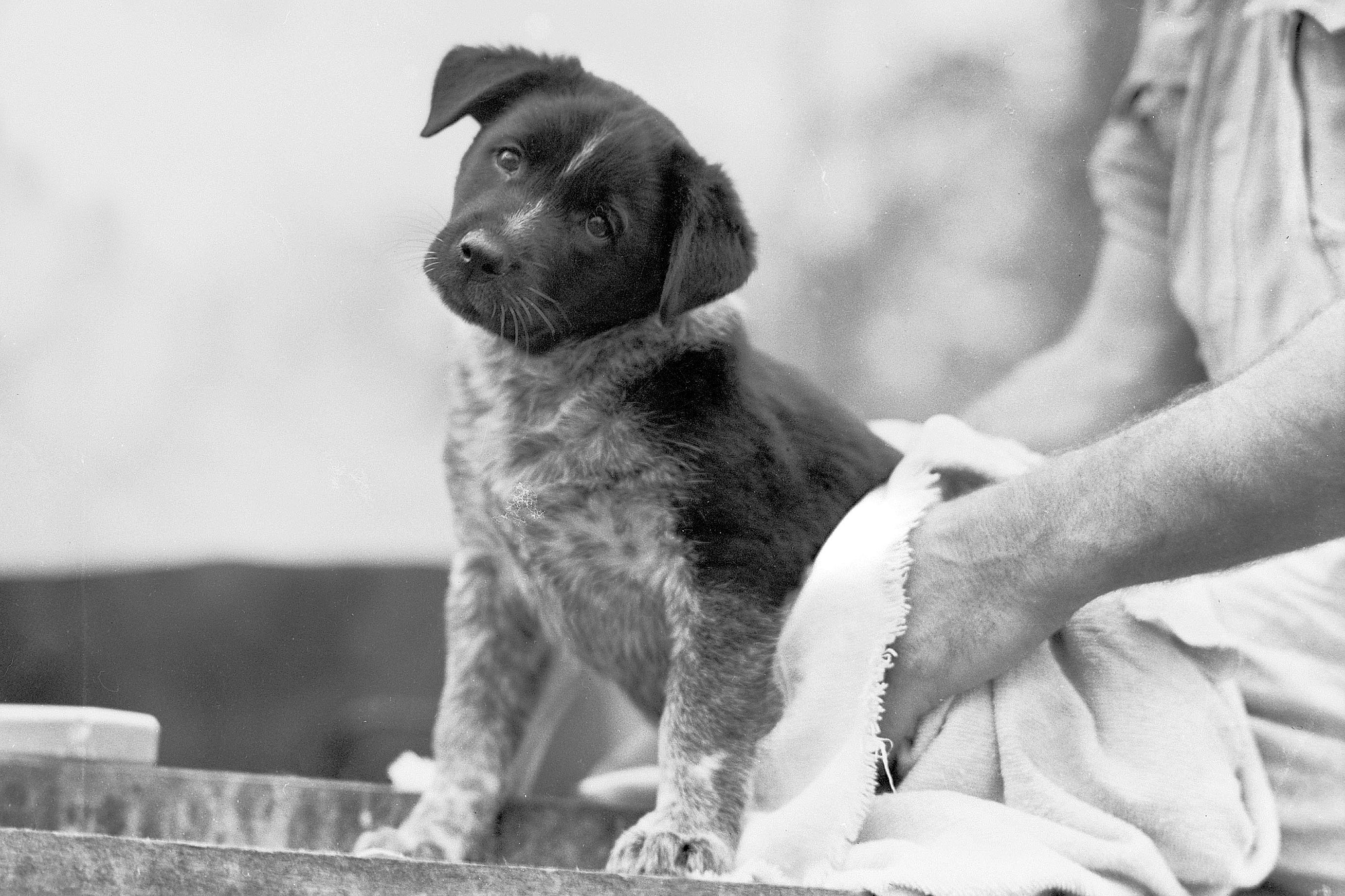
US soldiers met the Cattle Dog mascots of Australian divisions overseas. This puppy is being bathed in preparation for a visit by General Douglas MacArthur.

In the 1940s Alan McNiven, a Sydney veterinarian, introduced Dingo, Kelpie, German Shepherd, and Kangaroo Hound into his breeding program; however, the Royal Agricultural Society Kennel Club (RASKC) would not register the cross breeds as Australian Cattle Dogs, even though McNiven argued they were true to conformation, colour and temperament. McNiven responded by giving his pups registration papers from dead dogs, and was consequently expelled from the RASKC and all of his dogs removed from the registry. Meanwhile, Greg Lougher, a Napa, California cattle rancher who met Alan McNiven while stationed in Australia during World War II, had imported several adults and several litters from McNiven. After his de-registration McNiven continued to export his "improved" dogs to the United States. Many U.S. soldiers who were stationed in Queensland or NSW during the War discovered the Australian Cattle Dog and took one home when they returned.

In the late 1950s a veterinarian in Santa Rosa, California, Jack Woolsey, was introduced to Lougher's dogs. With his partners, he bought several dogs and started breeding them. The breeders advertised the dogs in Western Horsemen stating they were guaranteed to work and calling them Queensland Heelers. Woolsey imported several purebred Australian Cattle Dogs to add to his breeding program, including Oaklea Blue Ace, Glen Iris Boomerang and several Glen Iris bitches. The National Stock Dog Registry of Butler, Indiana, registered the breed, assigning American numbers without reference to Australian registrations.

Australian Cattle Dogs had been classified in the "miscellaneous" category at the American Kennel Club (AKC) since the 1930s; to get the breed full recognition, the AKC required that a National Breed Parent Club be organised for promotion and protection of the breed. In 1967 Esther Ekman met Chris Smith-Risk at an AKC show, and the two fell into conversation about their Australian Cattle Dogs and the process of establishing a parent club for the breed. By 1969 the fledgling club had 12 members and formally applied to the AKC for instructions. One of the requirements was that the club had to start keeping its own registry for the breed and that all dogs on the registry would have to be an extension of the Australian registry, tracing back to registered dogs in Australia. The AKC Parent Club members began researching their dogs, including exchanging correspondence with McNiven, and discovered that few of them had dogs that could be traced back to dogs registered in Australia. The AKC took over the club registry in 1979 and the breed was fully recognised in September 1980. The Australian Cattle Dog Club of America is still active in the promotion of the breed and the maintenance of breed standards. The National Stock Dog Registry continued to recognise Cattle Dogs without prerequisite links to Australian registered dogs, on the condition that any dog of unknown parentage that was presented for registry would be registered as an "American Cattle Dog", and all others would still be registered as "Australian Cattle Dogs".

=== In Canada ===
The breed gained official recognition from the Canadian Kennel Club in January 1980 after five years of collecting pedigrees, gathering support, and lobbying officials by two breeders and enthusiasts. The small number of Australian Cattle Dogs in Canada at the time were primarily working dogs on farms and ranches scattered across large distances. However, the fledgling breed club held conformation shows, obedience and agility competitions, and entered their dogs in sports including flyball and lure coursing. At the end of 1980, Landmaster Carina was named the first Australian Cattle Dog in Canada to gain both her conformation and obedience titles.

=== In the United Kingdom ===
The first registered Australian Cattle Dogs to arrive in the United Kingdom were two blue puppies, Lenthel Flinton and Lenthel Darlot, imported in 1980 by Malcolm Duding. They were followed soon afterwards by Landmaster Darling Red in whelp. Landmaster Darling Red was imported by John and Mary Holmes, and proved to be an outstanding brood bitch. Over the next few years additional Cattle Dogs arrived in the UK from the Netherlands, Kenya, Germany and Australia, although prior to relaxation of rules regarding artificial insemination, the UK gene pool was limited. In 1985 the Australian Cattle Dog Society of Great Britain was formed and officially recognised by the Kennel Club; before this they had to compete in the category "Any Variety Not Separately Classified". Australian Cattle Dogs were competing successfully in obedience and working trials in the UK during the 1980s.

== See also ==
- Bluey
- Texas Heeler

== General and cited references ==
- Beauchamp, Richard G. (1997). Australian Cattle Dogs. New York: Barron's Educational. ISBN 978-0-8120-9854-9.
- Beauchamp, Richard G. (2007). Australian Cattle Dogs: 2nd edition. New York: Barron's Educational. ISBN 978-0-8120-9854-9.
- Buetow, Katherine (1998). The Australian Cattle Dog: An Owner's Guide to a Happy Healthy Pet. New York: Howell Book House. ISBN 978-0-87605-446-8.
- Clark, Noreen R. (2003). A Dog Called Blue: The Australian Cattle Dog and the Australian Stumpy Tail Cattle Dog, 1840–2000. Wallacia, NSW: WriteLight Publishers. ISBN 978-0-9581934-3-6.
- Coren, Stanley (1995). The Intelligence of Dogs: A Guide to the Thoughts, Emotions, and Inner Lives of Our Canine Companions. New York: Bantam Books. ISBN 978-0-553-37452-0.
- Hamilton-Wilkes, Monty; Cumming, David (1982). Kelpie and Cattle Dog: Australian Dogs at Work. Sydney, NSW: Angus & Robertson. ISBN 978-0-207-14490-5.
- Holmes, John; Holmes, Mary (1993). The Complete Australian Cattle Dog. Simon and Schuster. ISBN 978-0-87605-014-9.
- Howard, A. J. (Bert) (1990). "Halls Heelers". In Russell W. Warner (ed.). Over-Halling the Colony: George Hall, Pioneer. Sydney, NSW: Southwood Press. ISBN 978-0-908219-07-0.
- Kaleski, Robert (2005). Australian Barkers and Biters. Warwickshire, UK: Vintage Dog Books. ISBN 978-1-905124-75-6.
- Lithgow, Scott (2001). Training and Working Dogs for Quiet Confident Control of Stock. Brisbane, Qld: University of Queensland Press. ISBN 978-0-7022-2394-5.
- Lowell, Michele (1990). Your Purebred Puppy: A Buyers Guide. New York: Henry Holt. ISBN 978-0-8050-1892-9.
- Pearse, Emma (2011). Sophie, Dog Overboard: The Incredible True Adventures of the Castaway Dog. London: Hodder & Stoughton. ISBN 978-1-4447-1520-0.
- Redhead, Connie (1988). The Good Looking Australian. Adelaide, SA: C. Redhead. ISBN 978-0-7316-2220-7.
- Renna, Christine Hartnagle (2009). Herding Dogs: Selecting and Training the Working Farm Dog. Freehold, NJ: Kennel Club Books. ISBN 978-1-59378-737-0.
- Robertson, Narelle (1990). Australian Cattle Dogs. Neptune City, NJ: TFH Publications. ISBN 978-0-7938-2808-1.
- Ruvinsky, Anatoly; Sampson, Jeff (2001). The Genetics of the Dog. Wallingford, UK: CABI Publishing. ISBN 978-0-85199-520-5.
- Schwartz, Charlotte (2009). Australian Cattle Dog: A Comprehensive Guide to Owning and Caring for Your Dog. Freehold, NJ: Kennel Club Books. ISBN 978-1-59378-368-6.
- Shaffer, Mari (1984). Heeler Power: A Guide to Training the Working Australian Cattle Dog. Medford, WI: Countryside Publications. OCLC 12987177.
- Simmons-Moake, Jane (1992). Agility Training: The Fun Sport for All Dogs. New York: Macmillan. ISBN 978-0-87605-402-4.
- Stockman, Mike (2002). Dog Breeds of the World: The Complete Reference to Pedigree Dogs of the World. New York: Hermes House. ISBN 978-1-84038-871-8.
