= Robert Kaleski =

Robert Lucian Stanislaus Kaleski
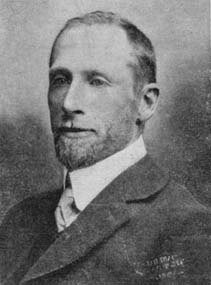
- Born: 1877; Burwood, New South Wales
- Died: 1961 (aged 83–84); Hammondville, New South Wales
- Occupations: Writer; bushman; environmentalist
- Known for: Australian Barkers and Biters

Robert Lucian Stanislaus Kaleski (1877–1961) was a self-taught writer, bushman, environmentalist and canine authority living in New South Wales at the turn of the nineteenth century. While he is perhaps best known for his role in breeding and compiling the first breed standard for the Australian Cattle Dog he also developed the first breed standard for the Australian Kelpie, wrote on a number of practical subjects for the newspapers of the time, and published works of fiction in magazines such as The Bookfellow and The Bulletin. In addition Kaleski patented his designs for improved farm implements, and developed and applied successful theories of soil management in times of drought.

A bachelor, he spent most of his life on his farm at Moorebank, where a street is now named in his honour. He died at the age of 84.

== Early years ==
Robert Kaleski was the son of a Polish mining engineer, John Kaleski, and his English wife Isabel, née Falder. Political pressures in Poland (The Russian, Prussian, and Austrian occupation of Poland - partitions of Poland) led John Kaleski to move to Germany, where he held academic appointments at Bonn and Heidelberg universities, and from there to Australia where he re-built a career as a mining engineer and assayer. Robert Kaleski was born on 19 January 1877 at Burwood in Sydney. Ill health as a child led to him spending long periods with a relative at Holsworthy, where he attended little school but learned much about the local bush.

In his teens, living in Sydney with access to a good library, he educated himself and began studying for a legal career, however he abandoned his studies at the age of twenty-one and went droving. He had a series of jobs in the bush including working on a property at Grenfell and timber getting on the Dorrigo Plateau before taking up a small selection at Holsworthy in 1904.

== Dog expert ==
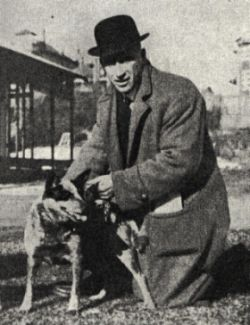
Kaleski with a Cattle Dog

Kaleski became a dog owner at the age of six years, was a lifelong student of the dog and the dingo and champion of Australian working dogs. He was one of a group of dog show enthusiasts who bred from cattle dogs that Kaleski described as originating on Thomas Hall's Dartbrook station in the Upper Hunter Valley. Kaleski later called them Halls Heelers.

In 1903 he compiled the first breed standard for the Cattle Dog, and in 1904 the first breed standard for the Kelpie and another variety of sheepdog he called the Barb, a breed which is now considered synonymous with the Kelpie. Later Cattle Dog standards, based on Kaleski's, proliferated until the Australian National Kennel Council standard, 1963, was adopted.

Kaleski founded the Cattle and Sheepdog Club of Australia. A dedicated breeder, he also worked his dogs with stock, and both exhibited and judged dogs in the show ring. With his dog Nugget (1908–12) he founded a noted line of Australian Cattle Dogs that included champions such as Clovelly Mavis and Clovelly Biddy.

== Writer ==
Under a variety of pen names, including 'Falder' his mother's maiden name, Kaleski wrote a number of articles on bush life for the Sydney Mail, Sydney Morning Herald, and Worker, and short fiction for The Bulletin. His articles on dogs and other animals were also featured in Alfred Stephens's literary magazine The Bookfellow. In association with the Royal Agricultural Society of NSW, the Forestry Commission of New South Wales, and the NSW Department of Agriculture he published articles on working dogs and settler life, and on the Australian bush.

He wrote The Australian settler's complete guide : scientific and practical published in 1909. Targeting British migrants, it was "written for the man on the land and for intending settlers in New South Wales" and contained detailed information about all types of farming, and the equipment needed. In it Kaleski gave practical directions for such essential tasks as Building the Hut.

In 1914 Kaleski published Australian Barkers and Biters - a booklet, more to entertain than to inform, with illustrations by Hugh Maclean. A second edition, in 1926, included articles from The Bookfellow. This edition was never publicly released but was revised and published, as a new edition, in 1933. Photographs replaced Maclean's illustrations in the 1933 edition.

Kaleski is mentioned in Dame Mary Gilmore's 1922 book of prose poems entitled Hound of the Road, "But who has written our dog? Kaleski? Kaleski wrote dogs, not the dog."

== Bushman ==
Kaleski is described as a "true bushman and environmentalist". He was keenly interested in agriculture, inventing and patenting a number of new or improved farm implements and practical tools. He lived through the devastating Federation Drought which reached its climax in late 1901 and 1902, and devised a water and soil management scheme to offset the effects of drought. In 1918 he bought a run-down farm at Moorebank, near Liverpool. He restored the 300 acres (120 ha) of Thorn Hill, applying his theories on land management. He lived at Thorn Hill until his death, and continued to experiment with plant breeding and other agricultural developments.

Kaleski was a Fellow of the Linnean Society of New South Wales.
