= John Bingle =

English-born Australian sailor, merchant and landholder (1796–1882)

John Bingle (15 May 1796 – 10 April 1882) was an English-born sailor who became a businessman and landowner in Newcastle, New South Wales.

== Early life ==
John Bingle was born on 15 May 1796 in Gillingham, Kent, England. He was the only surviving son of John Rayden Bingle. He was educated at Chatham. He was employed in the naval dockyard from 1812 to 1817 when he joined the merchant marine, namely the East India Company.

== Arriving in Australia ==
Bingle arrived in Australia at the age of 25 as a second officer on the convict ship Minerva on 16 December 1821. Soon after, he went to Lake Macquarie with Rev. George Augustus Middleton.

== Surveying Port Macquarie ==
In January 1822 received instruction from Governor Brisbane to proceed on the ship Sally to Port Macquarie then to sail to search for a large river that was believed to exist between Port Macquarie and Sandy Cape. He was commissioned by Governor to go as far as Moreton Bay. He failed to discover fresh water but received permission to build a vessel for trade with Newcastle.

== Puen Buen ==
He acquired 1800 acres of land which he named Puen Buen in 1820s. He became a squatter on property which is located at Dartbrook. Drought caused him to sell his land and start businesses in Newcastle. Later he sold his land to John Robertson.

== Business ==
He became business partners with Robert Coram Dillon and established a business at No.2 Watt Street, Newcastle. His business was dissolved in 1824. Bingle & Co established the first regular trading service between Sydney and Newcastle in 1822, carrying coal, cedar and merchandise in the Sally. Bingle sold his interest in venture after convicts stole his ship, the Eclipse. Five years after selling Puen Buen, he became director of two banks, a member of the diocesan committee of Christ Church and chairman of the Exchange.

== Other achievements ==
After he retired from His Majesty's services he applied for leave to build a vessel for the coal called the Eclipse. He worked as magistrate and was famous for catching a bushranger in Scone. He built the first courthouse in 1832 in Scone. He became the first chairman of the chamber of commerce in 1856. He designed the coat of arms of the City of Newcastle and had a key role in the adoption of the New South Wales flag. The first telegraph from Sydney to Newcastle on 11 January 1860 was sent from his office.

== Personal life ==
In August 1824 in Hobart Bingle married Mary Cross. They had a son and two daughters. He gave many donations to church and hospital funds. He moved his family to England in 1837, but returned to Australia in 1842.

Bingle died on 10 April 1882 at age 80. He was highly respected in Newcastle and flags were flown at half-mast in his honour. He was buried in the Christ Church graveyard.
