= Dartbrook =

Locality in New South Wales, Australia

Dartbrook New South Wales
- Coordinates: 32°15′00″S 150°53′02″E
- Population: 110 (2021 census)
- Established: 1825
- Postcode(s): 2336
- Location: 244 km (152 mi) N of Sydney; 141 km (88 mi) NW of Newcastle; 14 km (9 mi) N of Muswellbrook
- LGA(s): Upper Hunter Shire
- State electorate(s): Upper Hunter
- Federal division(s): Hunter

Dartbrook is a locality in the upper Hunter Valley of New South Wales, Australia.

== Geography ==
Dartbrook is located on a creek of the same name (Dart Brook) which flows south-east from the Liverpool Range to its confluence with the Hunter River a few kilometres downstream from the Dartbrook locality.

== History ==
Dartbrook is in the country of the Geawegal people who, before colonisation, resided across the Upper Hunter from Dartbrook to the Liverpool Range.

British colonisation began in October 1824 when surveyor Henry Dangar mapped the region for the colonial Government of New South Wales. Dangar named the Dart Brook rivulet and followed it north. He encountered a group of Geawegal living along Dart Brook who appeared confident toward the white men. Dangar described the land as a rich and eligible tract for colonisation. At the headwaters of the brook, Dangar's group had a three-hour battle with another party of 150 Aborigines and were forced to retreat when one of them was speared in the head. Dangar later allotted the best lands along Dart Brook for himself and his brother William, but legal proceedings taken against him resulted in his suspension from the surveying department and the transfer of these lands to the prominent colonist Peter MacIntyre.

Land grants at Dart Brook were also issued to other colonists, notably George Hall and his sons, who each received large parcels of land around where the modern day locality of Dartbrook is now situated. George Hall was a pioneer landowner of the Hawkesbury River region and his son, Thomas Simpson Hall, became a well known frontier pastoralist squatter. The Halls took up the property in 1825 and named it Dartbrook. They built a family mansion there called 'Dartbrook House'. The Halls also had a neighbouring estate called 'Nandowra'. Other colonists that received grants along Dart Brook were John Bingle, Peter MacIntyre, Donald MacIntyre, Stephen Coxen, Francis Little and William Dangar who respectively established the properties 'Puen Buen', 'Blairmore', 'Kayuga', 'Yarrandi', 'Invermein' and 'Turanville'.

By the early 1830s most of the land along Dart Brook had been taken up by pastoralists. A New South Wales Mounted Police station was established there to protect them from Aboriginal reprisals and bushrangers. In 1831 explorer, Sir Thomas Mitchell, found the Dart Brook clan of Geawegal people had been pushed out of their country and were suffering from smallpox in exile upon the Liverpool Plains.

The pastoral estates along Dartbrook were not further subdivided to any great degree until after World War I, when soldier settlement schemes saw the land parcelled off into smaller acreages.

== Economy ==
The economy of Dartbrook is mostly agriculturally based. The Dartbrook coal mine opened in July 1995 with a balloon loop rail connection to the Main Northern railway line but closed in 2006. It is scheduled to reopen in late 2023.

== Demographics ==
In 2021, the population of Dartbrook was 110 people.
