= Picardy Spaniel =

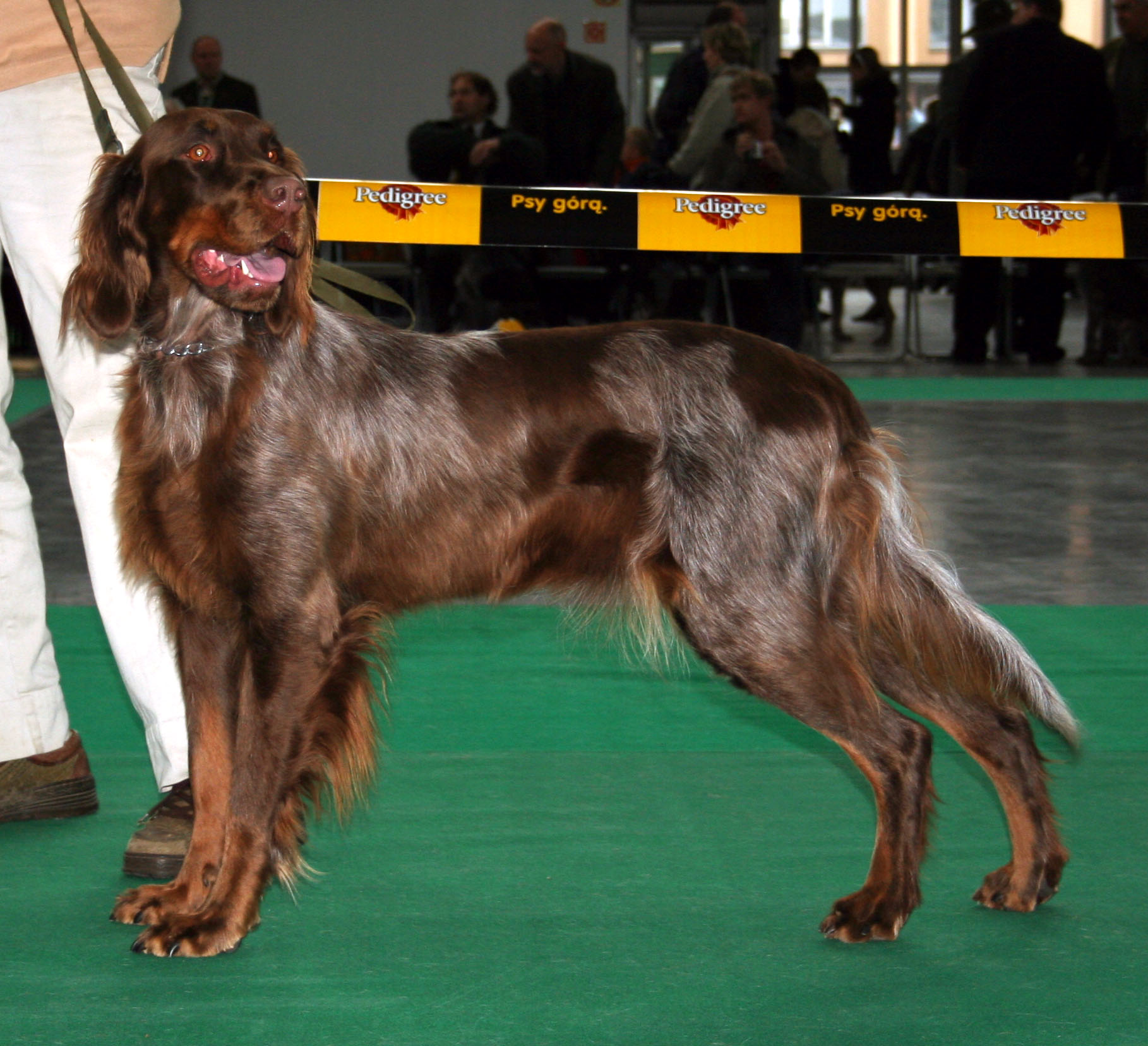
- A Picardy Spaniel
- Other names: Épagneul Picard
- Origin: France
Kennel club standards
- Société Centrale Canine: standard
- Fédération Cynologique Internationale: standard

The Picardy Spaniel is a breed of dog developed in France for use as a gundog. It is related to the Blue Picardy Spaniel, and still has many similarities, but the Picardy Spaniel is the older of the two breeds. It is thought to be one of the two oldest continental spaniel breeds and was favoured by the French nobility, remaining popular for hunting after the French Revolution due to its weather resistant coat that enabled it to hunt in a variety of conditions and terrain. However its popularity waned following the influx of English hunting breeds in the early 20th century. Slightly smaller than an English Setter but larger than most of its spaniel cousins, it has no major health issues although as with many breeds with pendulous ears, it can be prone to ear infections.

== History ==
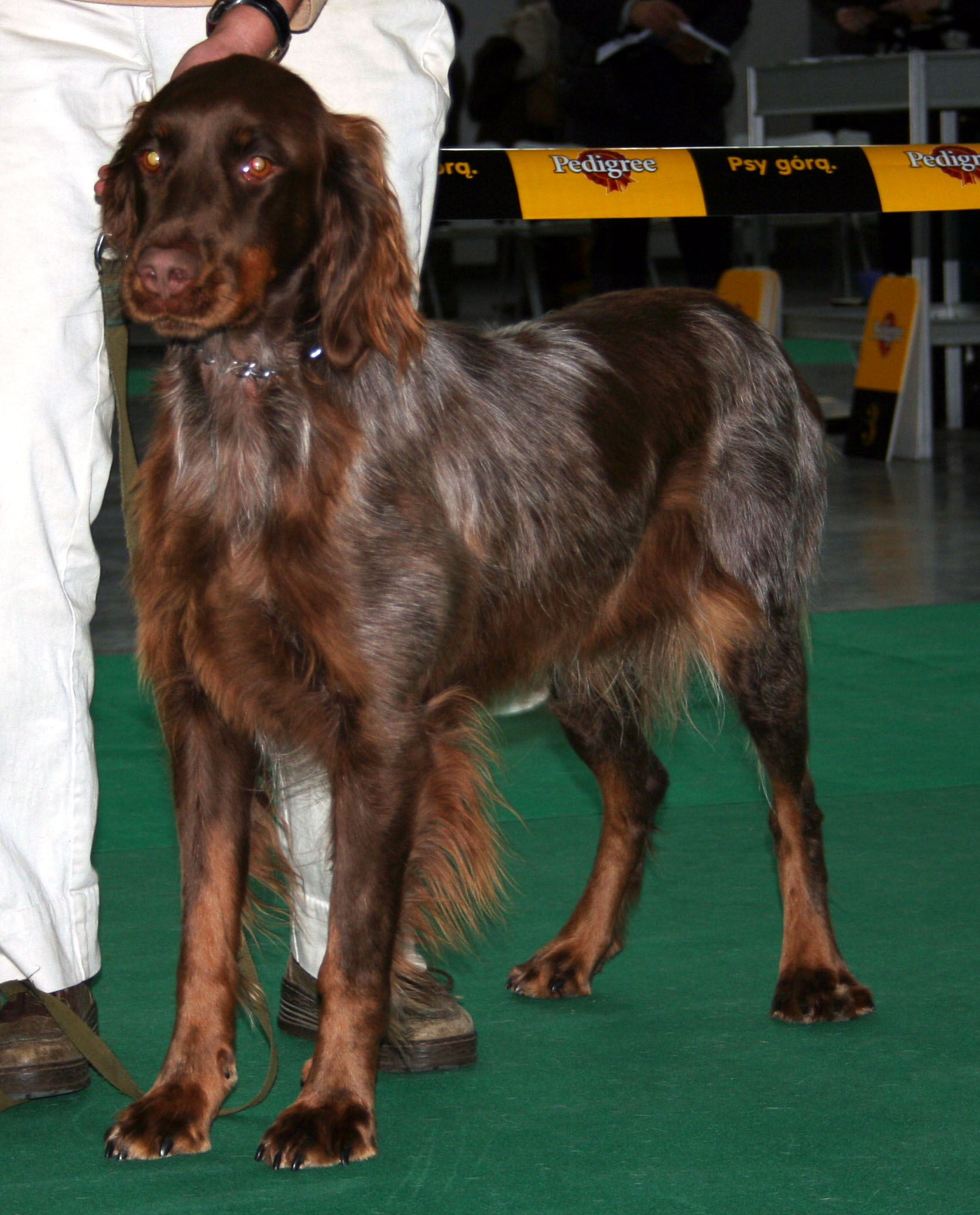
A Picardy Spaniel at a dog show in Poland.

The French Spaniel and the Picardy Spaniel are speculated to have stemmed from the Chien d' Oysel described in the writings of Gaston Phoebus. Hunting during this period in France was one of the favourite sports of the nobility and the French type of Spaniel became the favourite hunting dog of the French Royalty. The breed can be seen in paintings dating from this period by artists Alexandre-François Desportes and Jean-Baptiste Oudry. They were also the first breed of dog to be admitted into salons.

The breed became more popular still following the French Revolution and the aftermath in which hunting was no longer restricted to the nobility. Although spread throughout France, a large concentration was located in the north west where the weather resistant coat of the breed made it ideal for the wooded and swampy conditions. During the early 19th century, British hunters crossed the channel to hunt in the grounds of north west France. The British brought their own hunting dogs, and this resulted in a change of preference as French hunters switched to English breeds and caused a major blow to the existence of the Picardy Spaniel. In addition the infusion of blood from the English Setter into the local spaniel population created the Blue Picardy Spaniel.

=== Recognition ===
The Epagneul Picard Club was formed in 1921 and was merged with the Club of Blue Picardy Spaniel on 28 July 1937. A further merger took place on 21 May 1980 when these clubs merged with the Pont-Audemer Club to form the Club des Epagneuls Picards, Bleus de Picardie & Pont Audemer.

The Picardy Spaniel is recognised by a variety of Kennel Clubs and associations including the North American Kennel Club, American Rare Breed Association, United Kennel Club, and the Fédération Cynologique Internationale. All four associations use the standard as set by the FCI. It is also recognised by the Continental Kennel Club, but unlike the closely related Blue Picardy Spaniel, it is not recognised by the Canadian Kennel Club.

== Description ==
=== Appearance ===
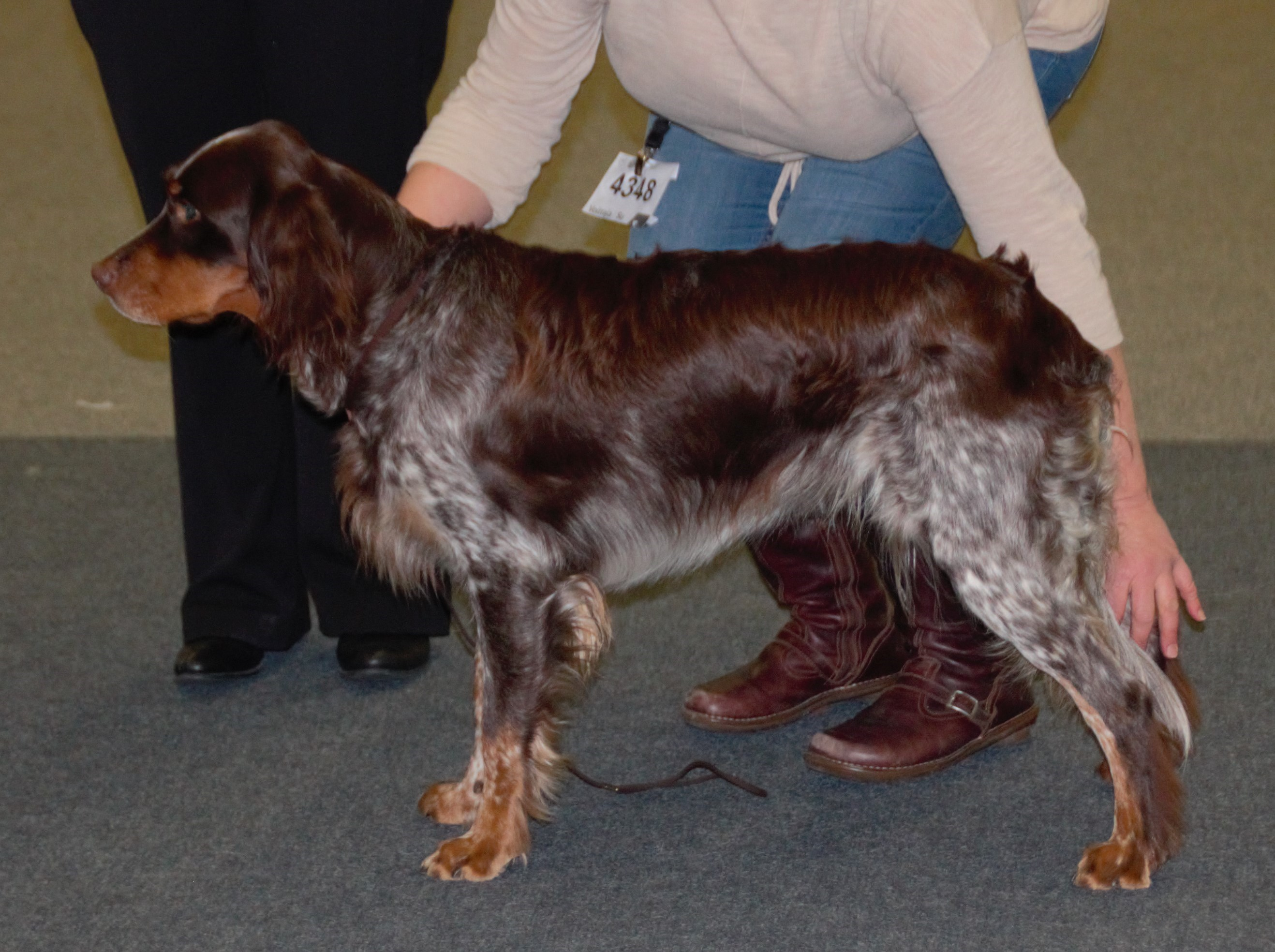
A Picardy Spaniel female.

Typical examples of the breed measure between 22–24 inches (56–61 cm) at the withers, with the average weight between 20–25 kilograms (44–55 lb). The breed is similar in size to the English Setter, although is slightly smaller. Of the Spaniel type breeds, only the Large Münsterländer and Drentse Patrijshond are recognised as possibly growing to larger sizes, with the Drentse measuring 21.5–25.5 in (55–65 cm), and the Münsterländer slightly smaller with a narrower range at 23–25 in (58–64 cm).

The breed has a squarely built muscular body and an oval shaped head with a long muzzle and long ears that hang fairly low. Its coat can vary in colours from chocolate, chestnut brown and white with sandy coloured markings on the head and white or grey spots on the legs. Its hair is abundant with a slight wave, enabling it to work in dense cover and even in water.

=== Temperament ===
The Picardy Spaniel is a docile breed of dog and is fond of playing with children and bonds well with their master. It is described as having a gentle sociable nature, possessing a good character with a laid-back attitude, and being relatively easy to train. In France, the breed is used for hunting in wooded areas for pheasants, and in swamps for snipes. However it can also be used for hunting ducks, hares and rabbits. The breed excels at hunting in marshes and will not hesitate to jump into water. It can also adequately serve as a retriever should it be required. The dog is content with a small amount of space and could suit life in the city, but also loves open spaces.

== Health ==
The Picardy Spaniel has no known hereditary health problems, and has an average lifespan of 14 years. However being a hunting spaniel, the breed is prone to ear infections. These infections are common among dogs with pendulous ears, including Basset Hounds and other breeds of spaniel. Overfeeding a Picardy Spaniel may lead to overweight.

== Gallery ==
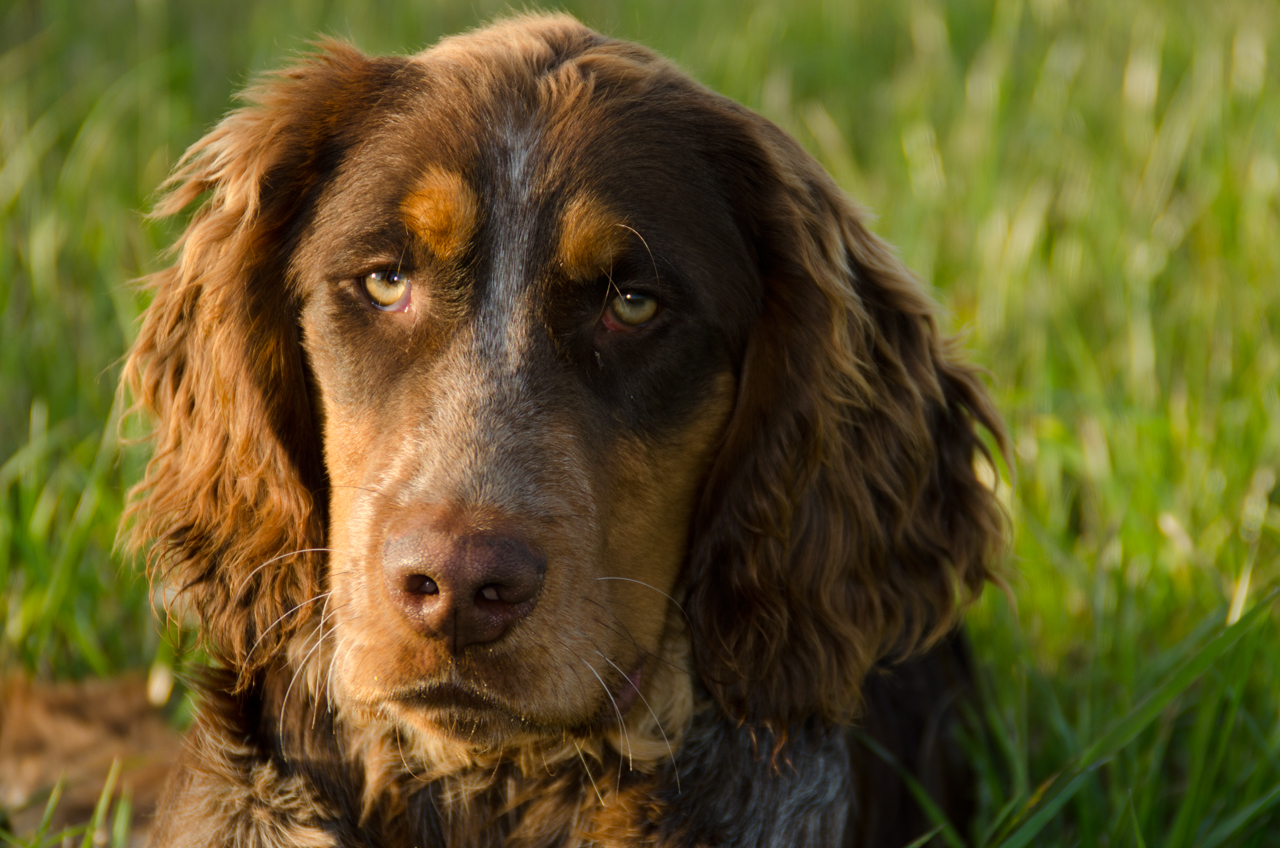
Gibbs des Chaumes de Thiérache, young picardy spaniel 6 months old

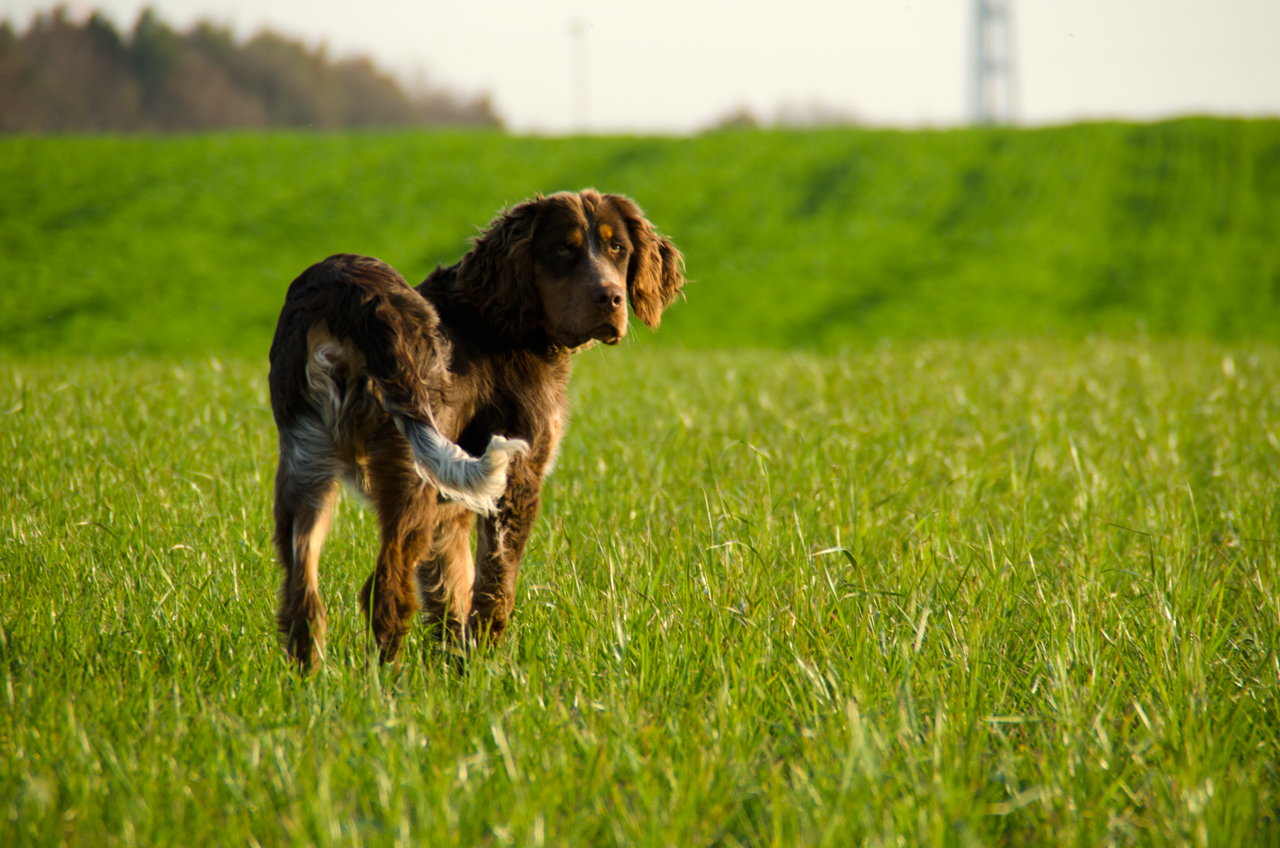
Gibbs des Chaumes de Thiérache, young picardy spaniel 6 months old

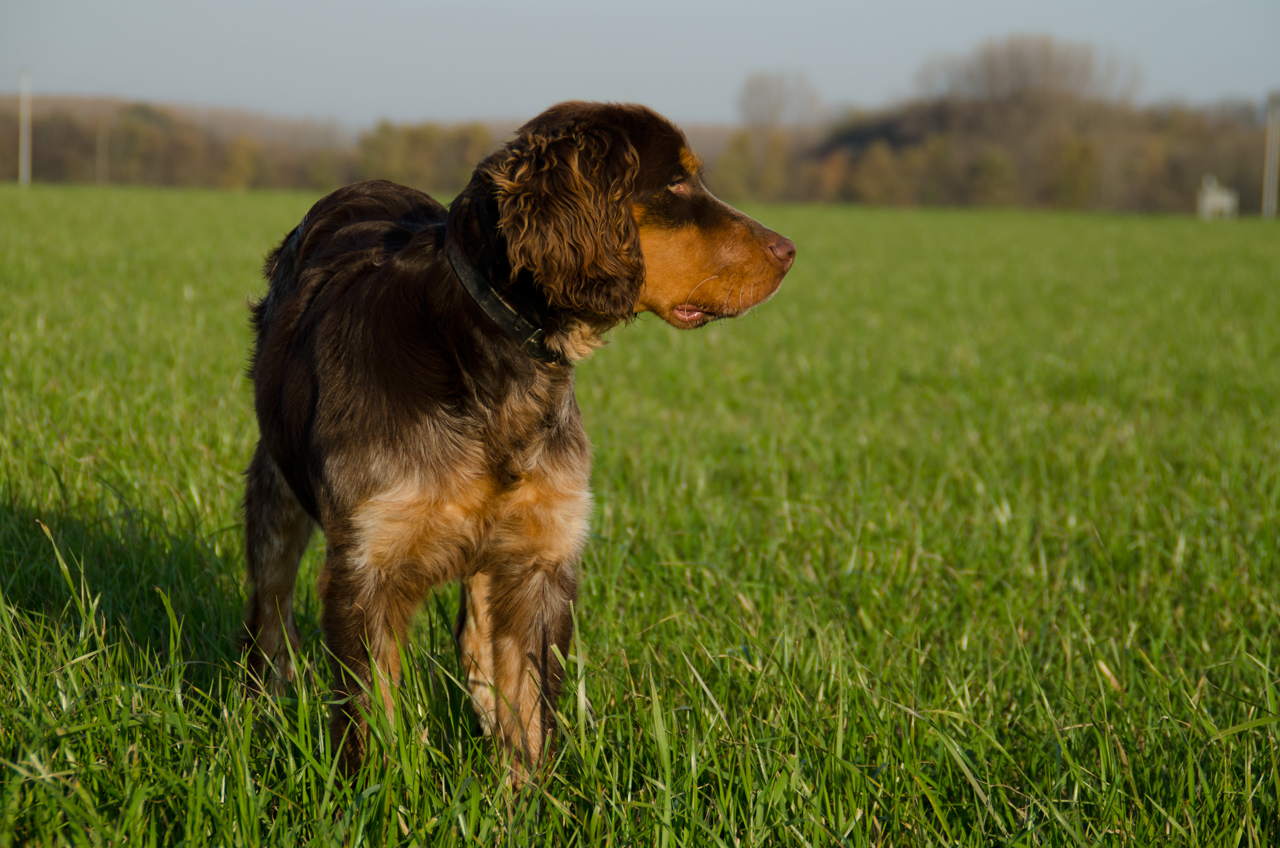
Gibbs des Chaumes de Thiérache, young picardy spaniel 6 months old

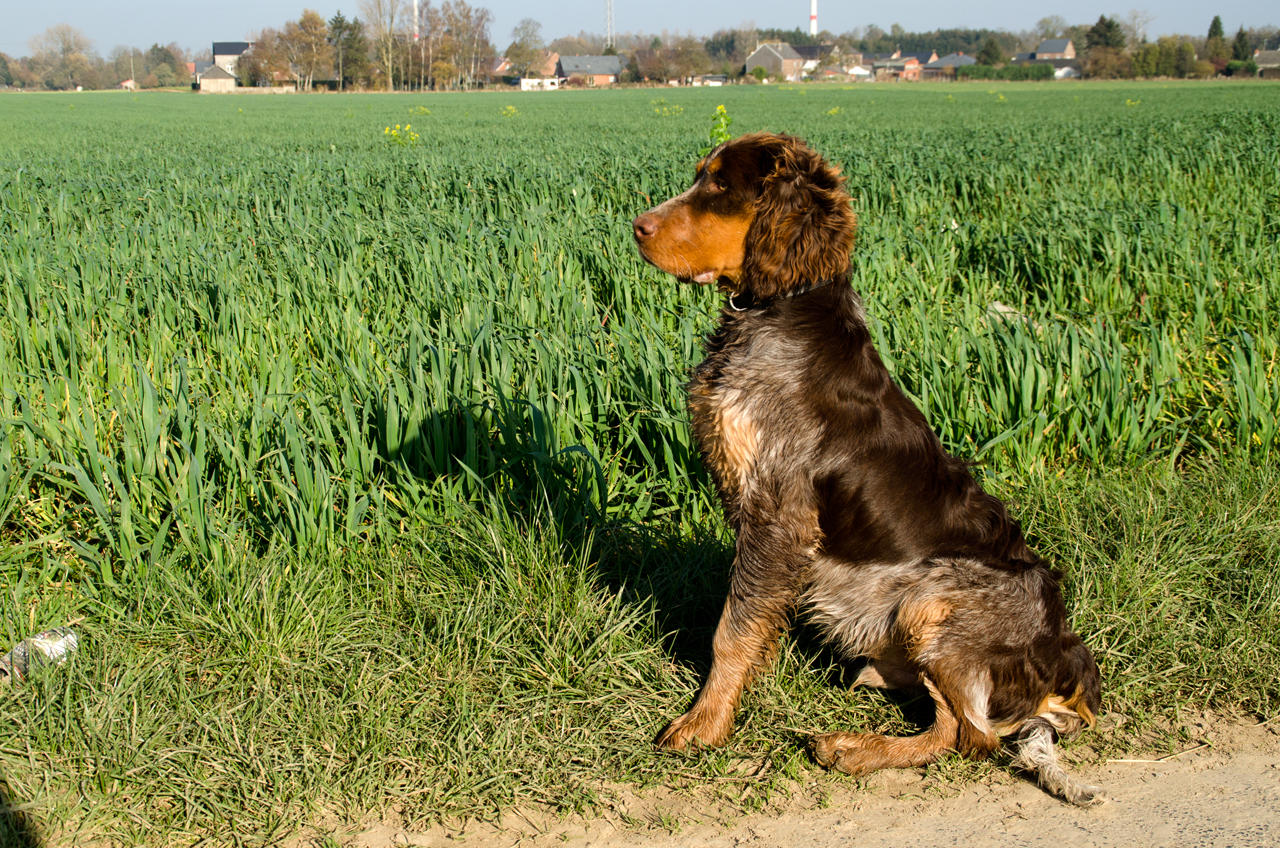
Gibbs des Chaumes de Thiérache, young picardy spaniel 6 months old
