= French Spaniel =

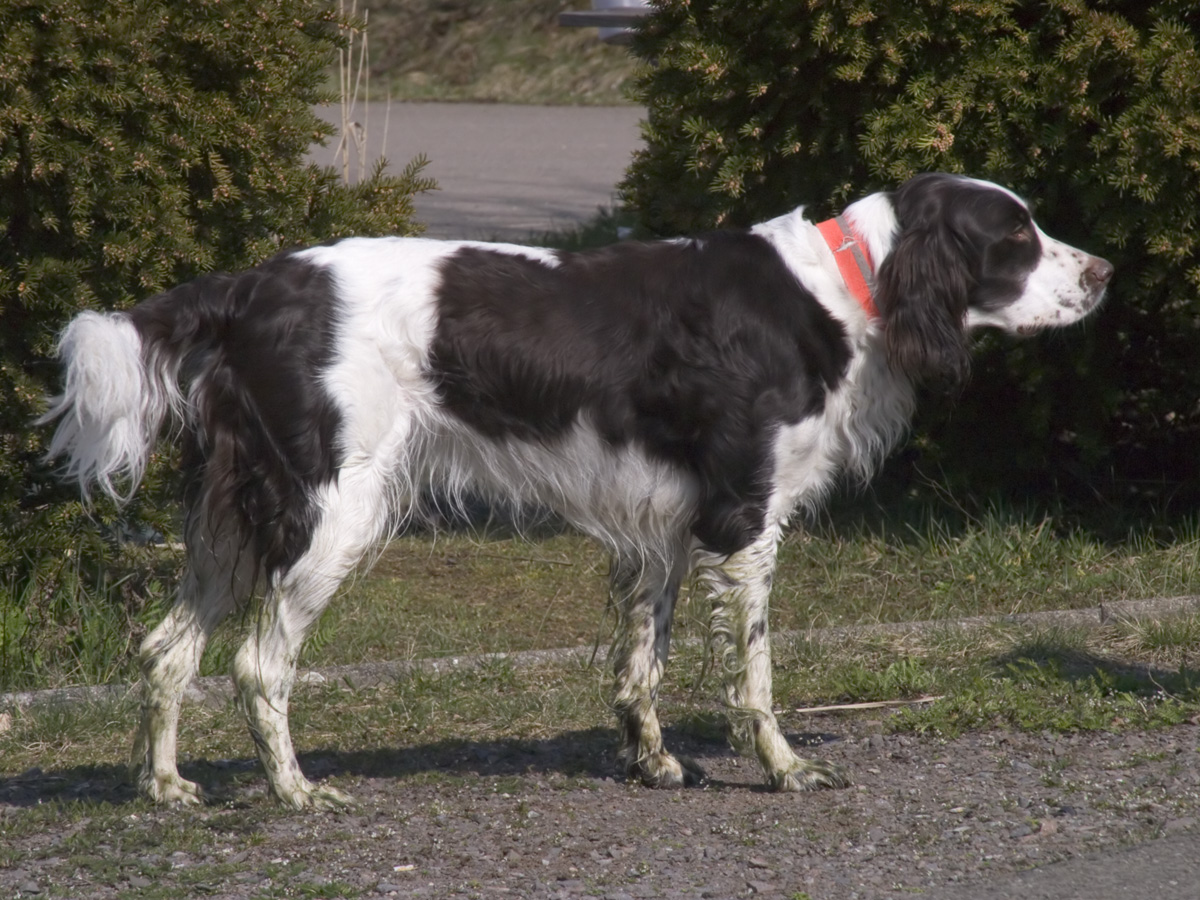
- A French Spaniel
- Other names: Epagneul Français; French Setter; Canadian Setter
- Origin: France and Canada
Traits
Height	Males	55–63 cm (22–25 in)
	Females	54–61 cm (21–24 in)
- Coat: Straight, or slightly wavy and of medium length.
- Colour: White with brown markings
Kennel club standards
- Société Centrale Canine: standard
- Fédération Cynologique Internationale: standard

The French Spaniel (épagneul français) is a breed of dog of the Spaniel-like setter. It was developed in France and Canada as a hunting dog, descended from dogs of the 14th century. Popular with royalty during the Middle Ages, it nearly became extinct by the turn of the 20th century but was saved by the efforts of Father Fournier, a French priest. One of the largest breeds of Spaniel, it typically has a white coat with brown markings. It is a friendly breed that has few health issues, but can be affected by a syndrome called acral mutilation and analgesia. The breed is recognised by Canadian and international kennel clubs but not by The Kennel Club (UK). The American Kennel Club has included the breed in its Foundation Stock Service, the first step to full recognition.

== History ==
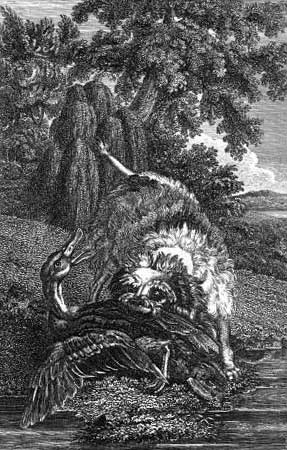
A drawing of a French Spaniel being used to hunt Mallards from 1805.

Spaniels were first mentioned in France during the 14th century in Gaston III of Foix-Béarn's work Livre de chasse, later translated into English as The Master of Game. The French Spaniel was referred to as a specific type of Spaniel by 1660 and was noted as being distinctive from the King Charles Spaniel of the Holland type.

The breed was popular during the Middle Ages with it used for falconry and as a settling dog for net hunting. They became a favourite of French Royalty and Kings and Princes at the royal courts of Versailles favored them over other breeds of hunting dogs. In addition, Catherine I of Russia (1684–1727) was known to have owned a French Spaniel named Babe. During this period, the French Spaniel was known to have split into several regional types.

The Sporting Magazine wrote of the French Spaniel and the hunting of mallards in 1805, "The rough French Spaniel has been found the best companion on these occasions: he watches the conduct of the sportsman, and, with a velocity unequalled, darts on the wounded prey, presents it with all possible speed at the feet of his master." In the 1850s, the Brittany (formerly known as Brittany Spaniel) was developed from crossing French Spaniels with English Setters.

James de Connick established the first breed standard for the French Spaniel in 1891. At the turn of the 20th century, the numbers of French Spaniels dropped so low that they nearly became extinct due to competition from foreign sporting dogs, in particular as French hunters chose to hunt particularly with English breeds of hunting dogs. A French priest named Father Fournier undertook the task of gathering the remaining French Spaniels in his Saint Hillaire kennels in order to preserve the breed. There he built the lineages that are representatives of those we now have. The French Spaniel Club was founded in 1921, with Father Fournier as the president of the association. The modern French Spaniel is one of a group of recognised French Spaniels, including the Brittany, Picardy and Blue Picardy.

=== Recognition ===
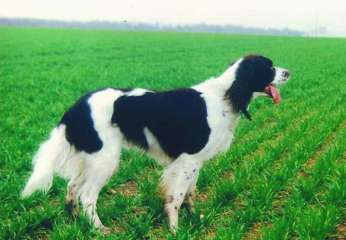
A French Spaniel with black markings.

The French Spaniel was little known outside France and neighboring countries until it was introduced in the Canadian province of Quebec in the 1970s. It quickly became a popular dog for hunting woodcock and grouse. The Club de l'Épagneul Français du Canada was formed in 1978 to ensure the French Spaniel would continue to meet breed standards and to pursue official recognition by the Canadian Kennel Club, by which the breed was recognised in 1985.

French Spaniels are also recognized by the Fédération Cynologique Internationale, and the United Kennel Club. The Kennel Club (UK) and the American Kennel Club do not recognize the French Spaniel, but is recognised by the North American Versatile Hunting Dog Association, and can be registered with US dog registries in order to record their registries and compete in associated dog shows, such as the Dog Registry of America, American Canine Association, and America's Pet Registry.

To qualify for recognition by the American Kennel Club, a national breed club must first be established and a written request needs to be sent to the AKC along with a breed standard. This enables qualification for the Foundation Stock Service. The next step is to qualify to compete in the Miscellaneous Class. This requires a minimum of one hundred active members in the national breed club, along with a minimum of three to four hundred dogs in the United States with a three generation pedigree (all dogs in those pedigrees must be of the same breed). In addition, they must be geographically spread across twenty states or more, and finally the clubs by-laws and constitution must be reviewed as well as breed observations made by AKC staff. There is a typical stay of between one and three years in the Miscellaneous Class before full recognition is granted. During this time, the breed club must be seen to be active and hold seminars, matches as well as local and national speciality shows. The Kennel Club (UK) does not have a miscellaneous class or foundation stock service, instead it requires British bred dog and three generation pedigrees of them, along with details from the country of origin including the breed standard. This allows listing on the Imported Breeds Register, with full recognition granted at the discretion of the Kennel Club Review Committee.

== Description ==
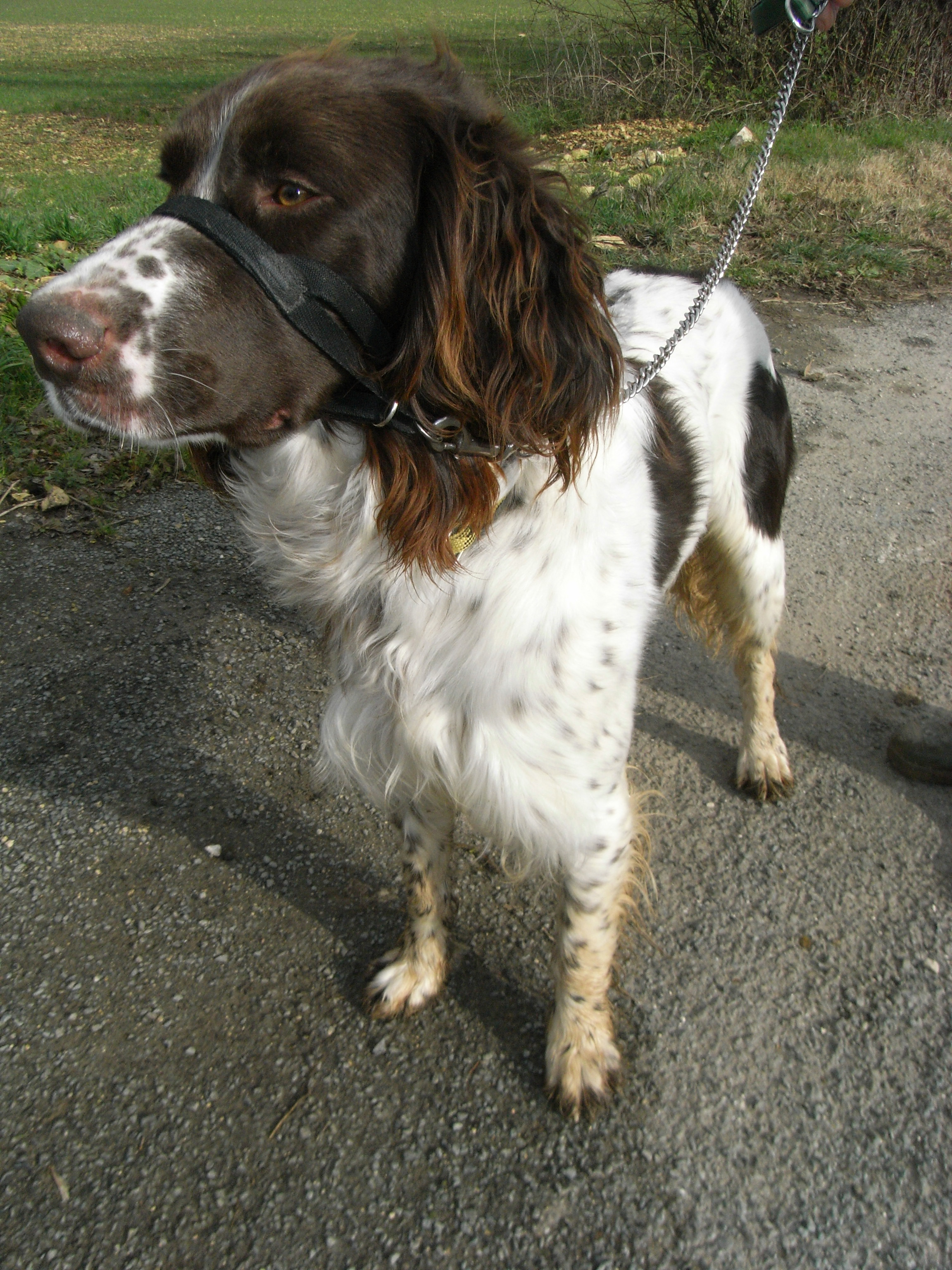
A brown and white French Spaniel.

The French Spaniel is one of the two tallest spaniel breeds, being taller than the English Springer Spaniel. Males can range in height from 22–24 inches (56–61 cm), and females are about an inch shorter. Dogs can range in weight from 45–60 pounds (20–27 kg).

A normal dog has a muscular appearance with a deep chest and strong legs. The French Spaniel has eyes of a dark amber colour, and a thick tail that tapers towards the tip. The hair is medium, dense, with long feathers on the ears, backs of the legs and tail. It has some waviness on the chest and otherwise lies flat on the body. The normal colour of a French Spaniel's coat is white with brown markings rather in shade from a light cinnamon to dark liver. Historically, the coat was only white with black markings, but the breed was mixed with other colours of Spaniels during the 19th century.

== Temperament ==
The French Spaniel has a friendly and outgoing personality and is well balanced and patient. It is not a naturally aggressive dog, is eager to please and thus can be trained easily. A dog of this breed will form a strong bond with its master, being typically a working dog. It has a high level of stamina and requires vigorous exercise.

== Health ==
The breed is robustly healthy with few issues and adapts well to wet weather conditions. A dermatological condition known as acral mutilation and analgesia may affect French Spaniels. It is a newly recognised disorder, with symptoms becoming apparent between three and a half months and a year of age. It was first reported in thirteen dogs in Canada and shares symptoms with the acral mutilation syndromes of the German Shorthaired Pointer, English Pointer and English Springer Spaniels. Dogs who are affected will lick, bite and mutilate their extremities resulting in ulcers with secondary bacterial infections. Self amputation of claws, digits and footpads can happen in extreme cases. The majority of the initial dogs identified were euthanised within days to months of being diagnosed.

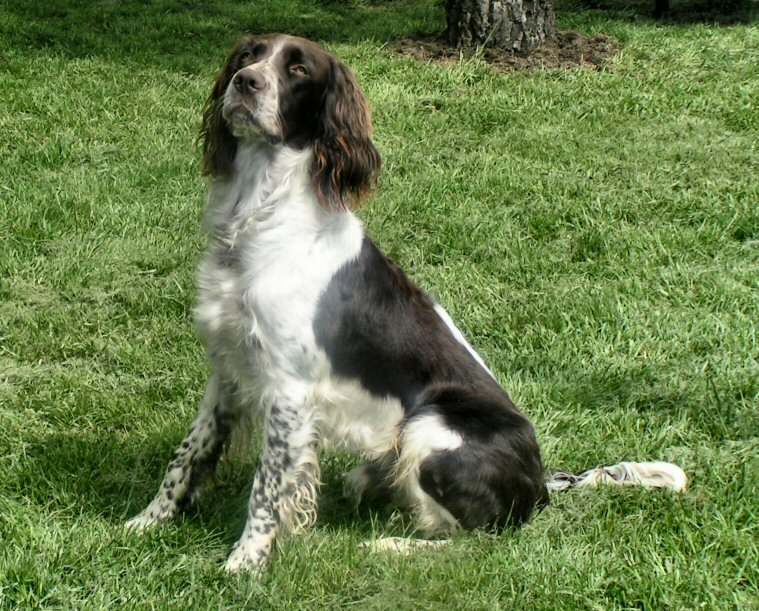

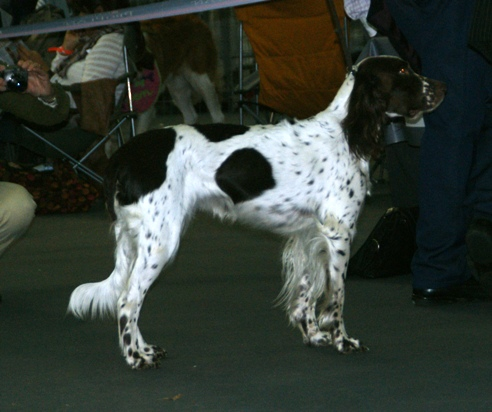

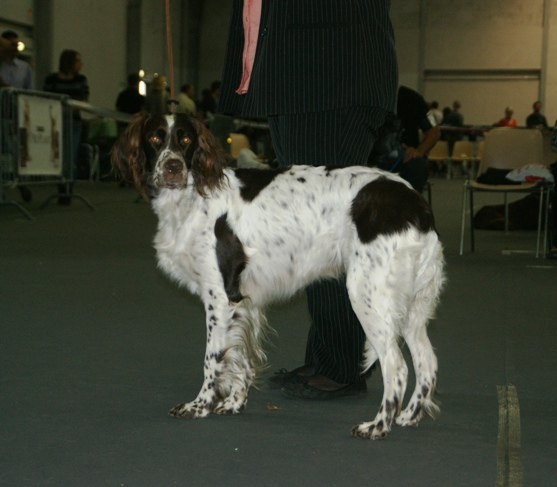

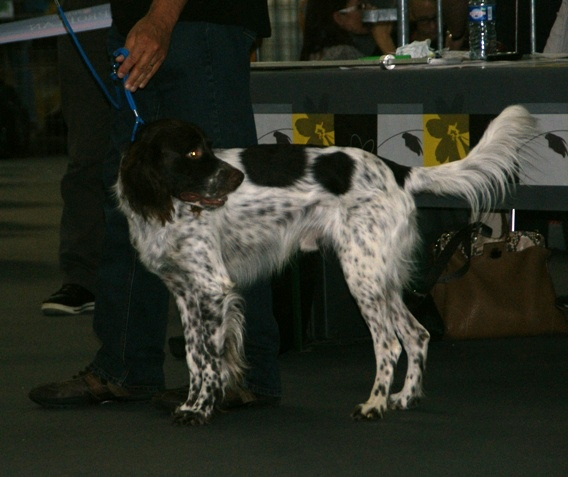
