= Retriever =

Dog type

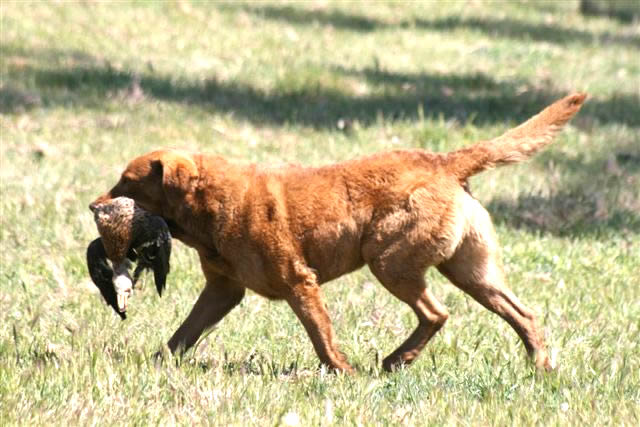
Chesapeake Bay Retriever with duck

A retriever is a type of gun dog that retrieves game for a hunter. Generally gun dogs are divided into three major classifications: retrievers, flushing spaniels, and pointing breeds. Retrievers were bred primarily to retrieve birds or other prey and return them to the hunter without damage; retrievers are distinguished in that nonslip retrieval is their primary function. As a result, retriever breeds are bred for soft mouths and a great willingness to please, learn, and obey. A soft mouth refers to the willingness of the dog to carry game in its mouth without biting into it. "Hard mouth" is a serious fault in a hunting dog and is very difficult to correct. A hard-mouthed dog renders game unpresentable or at worst inedible.

The retriever's willingness to please, patient nature and trainability have made breeds such as the Labrador Retriever and Golden Retriever popular as a disability assistance dog. The outstanding reputation of the retriever has landed both the Labrador and the Golden Retriever among the top 10 best dogs for children and families around the world.

== Skills ==
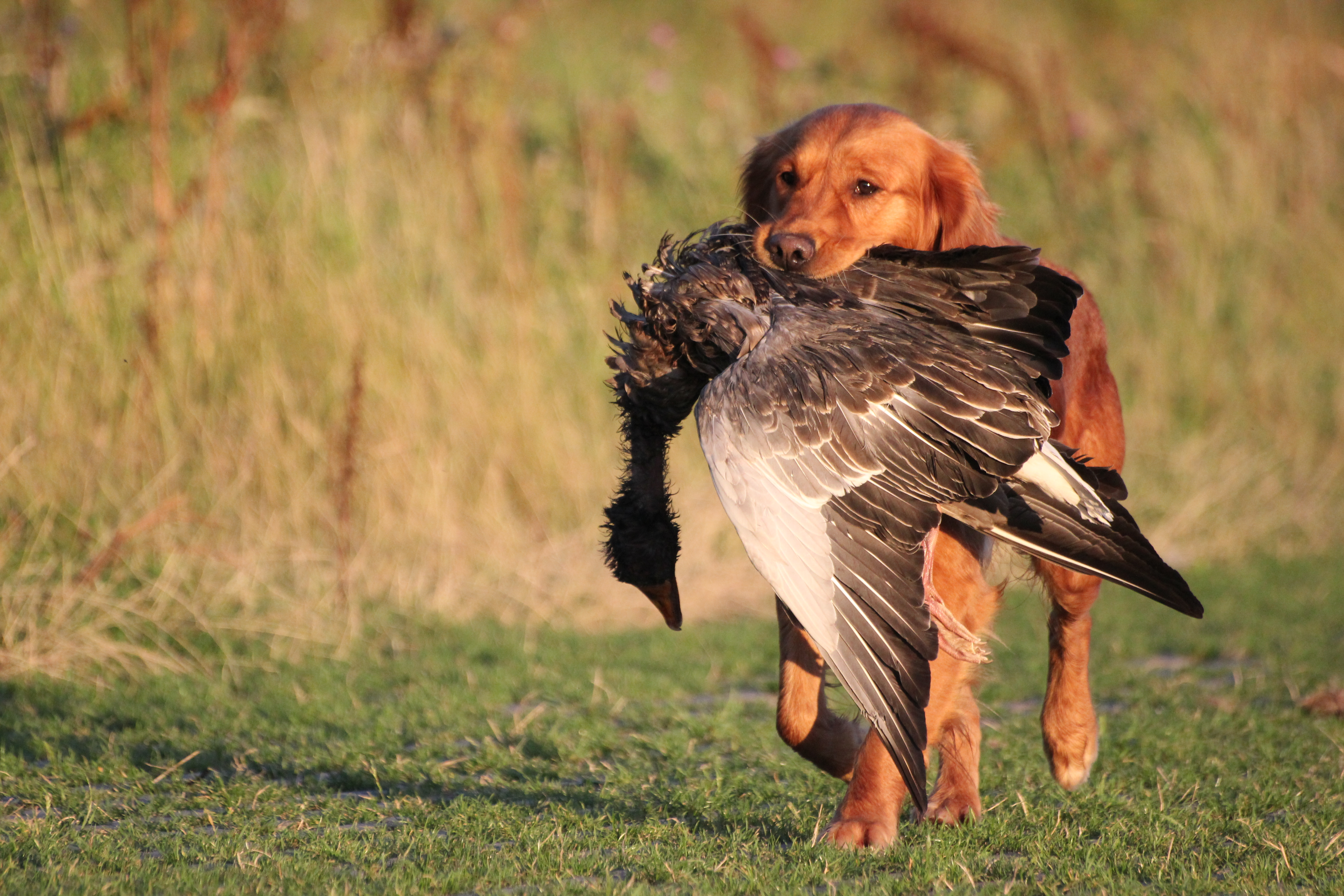
A Golden Retriever

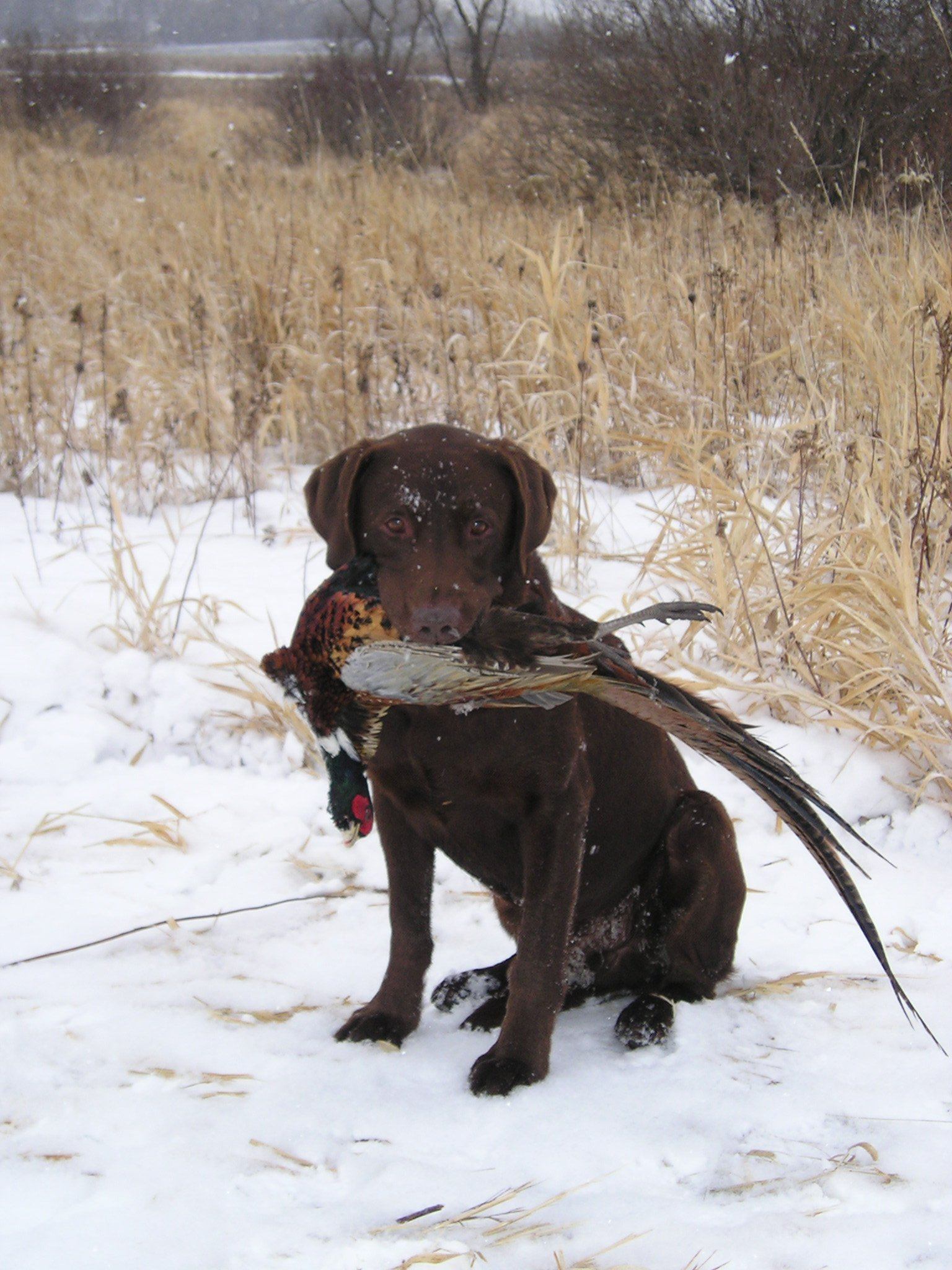
Labrador Retriever with pheasant

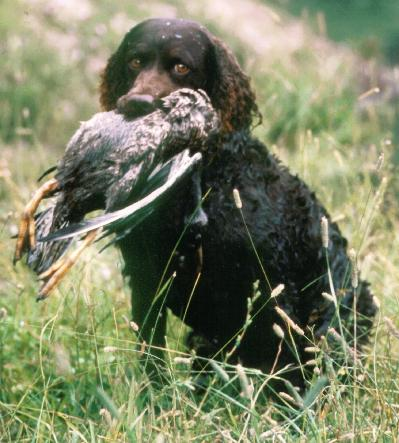
American Water Spaniel

To carry out the duties of a gun dog, a retriever should be trained to perform these tasks:

- Remain under control: Retrievers are typically used for waterfowl hunting. Since a majority of waterfowl hunting employs the use of small boats in winter conditions, retrievers are trained to remain under control sitting calmly and quietly until sent to retrieve. This is often referred to as "steadiness". Steadiness helps to avoid an accidental capsizing, disrupting the hunter's aim or the possible accidental discharge of a firearm which could cause serious harm or death to others in the hunting party or to the dog itself. A steady dog is also better able to "mark" downed game.
- Mark downed game: Marking is the process of watching for a falling bird or multiple birds. When the command "mark" is given, the dog should look up for incoming birds and remember where each bird falls. Well-trained retrievers are taught to follow the direction the gun barrel is pointing to mark where the birds fall. Once the game is downed, the handler will command the dog to retrieve the game. The dog's ability to remember multiple "marks" is extremely important, and trainers use techniques to improve a dog's marking and memory ability.
- Perform a blind retrieve: When hunting waterfowl, a retriever's primary job is to retrieve downed birds. At times, a dog will not see the game fall, so retrievers are trained to take hand, voice, and whistle commands from the handler directing the dog to the downed game for retrieval. This is called a "blind retrieve". Precision between the dog and handler is extremely useful and desired so as to minimize retrieval time and limit the disturbance of surrounding cover. The majority of blind retrieves in the field are made within 30-80 yards of the gun, but a good retriever/handler team can perform precise blind retrieves out to 100+ yards and more.
- Retrieve to hand: Although some hunters prefer to have a bird dropped at their feet, the majority of handlers require the dog to deliver the game to hand, meaning once the dog has completed the retrieve, it will gently but firmly hold the bird until commanded to release it to the handler's hand. Delivery to hand reduces the risk of a crippled bird escaping, as the bird remains in the dog's mouth until the handler takes hold of it.
- Honoring: When hunting with multiple dogs, a retriever should remain under control while other dogs work, and wait its turn. This is important because having multiple dogs retrieving game simultaneously can cause confusion. This is one reason why many handlers use the dog's name as the command to retrieve.
- Shake on command: Following a retrieve, a well-trained dog will not shake off excess water from its fur until after the delivery is complete. A dog shaking water from its fur in a small boat at worst risks capsizing the craft in cold winter conditions and at best will most likely shower hunters and equipment. Also, a dog shaking while still holding the game in its mouth could damage the bird to the point of making it unfit for the table. To avoid these mishaps, trainers use a distinct command releasing a dog to shake.
- Quarter: Retrievers are often used in a secondary role as an upland flushing dog. Dogs must work in a pattern in front of the hunter seeking upland game birds. The retriever must be taught to stay within gun range to avoid flushing a bird outside of shooting distance.
- Remain steady to wing and shot: When hunting upland birds, the flushing dog should be steady to wing and shot, meaning it sits when a bird rises or a gun is fired. It does this to mark the fall and to avoid flushing other birds by unnecessarily pursuing a missed bird.

Although most individual retrievers have the raw capacity to be trained to perform as a gun dog, a significant amount of thought and effort is given to breeding in specific desired traits into dogs from field bred lines that greatly enhance the training process. When breeding retrievers for field work, extensive consideration is given to:

- Biddableness: Because producing a well-trained retriever capable of performing the tasks outlined above requires a significant amount of time and effort, an intelligent, controllable, and open-to-learning (biddable) retriever is of utmost importance.
- Desire and drive: These traits covers a broad range of behaviors exhibited by the "good retriever". Most notably, they demonstrate the desire to retrieve almost to the point of manic behavior and take on significant obstacles to make a retrieve. They also demonstrate an exceptional interest in birds, bird feathers, and bird scent, which is termed "birdiness".
- Marking and memory: Eyesight and depth perception are of paramount importance to a dog's ability to mark downed game. Remembering each fall is also critical. While retriever trainers use special techniques to help a dog to mark and remember downed game, a good retriever is born with these "raw tools".
- Nose: Dogs are led primarily by their nose. A good retriever uses its nose to find downed game in heavy cover and while quartering a field to locate and flush upland game birds.
- Soft mouth: A soft-mouthed dog is needed to ensure retrieved game is fit for the table. A soft-mouthed dog picks up and holds game softly but firmly on the retrieve. Dogs that unnecessarily drop birds, crunch on, chew, or even eat the bird before delivery to the handler are considered "hard-mouthed" or are described as having "mouth problems". While training can overcome most "mouth problems", a dog with an inherently soft mouth is more desirable when starting the training process.
- Hardiness: Waterfowl hunting is a cold-weather sport undertaken across a wide variety of locations and conditions, from thick, flooded timber in the south US, to icy and ice-covered ponds in the Midwest to frigid seas along upper the New England coast. A good retriever willingly re-enters the water and makes multiple retrieves under these and other extreme conditions.

== Lifespan ==
The average lifespan of a retriever is about 10–12 years. Some may live up to 15 years.

== Retriever breeds ==
- Chesapeake Bay Retriever
- Curly Coated Retriever
- Flat Coated Retriever
- Golden Retriever
- Labrador Retriever
- Nova Scotia Duck Tolling Retriever
- Murray River Retriever

=== Other dogs with retrieving skill ===
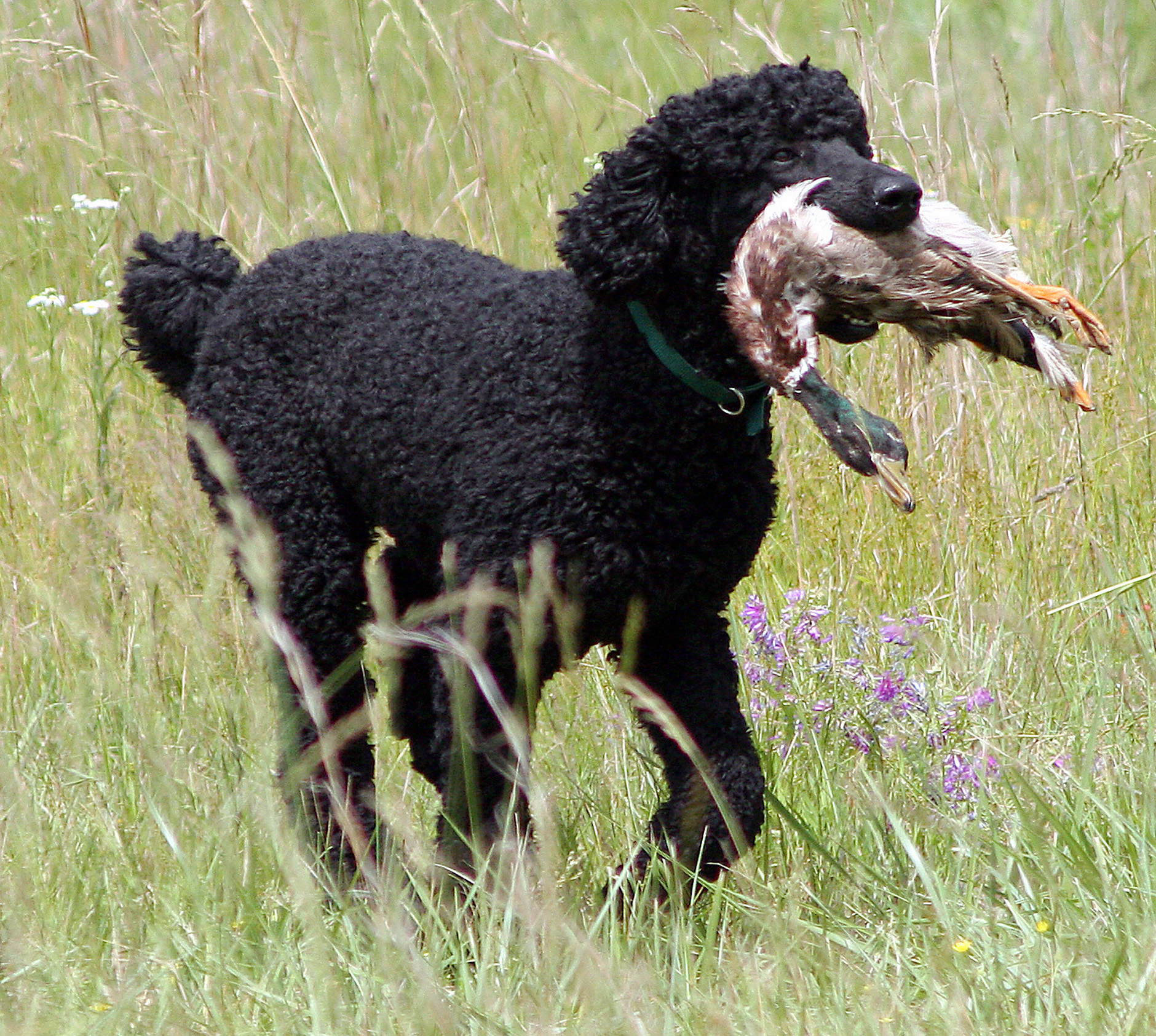
A black Standard Poodle retrieving a Mallard. Poodles are one of the oldest breeds of retrievers, originally bred to retrieve ducks in Germany and France.

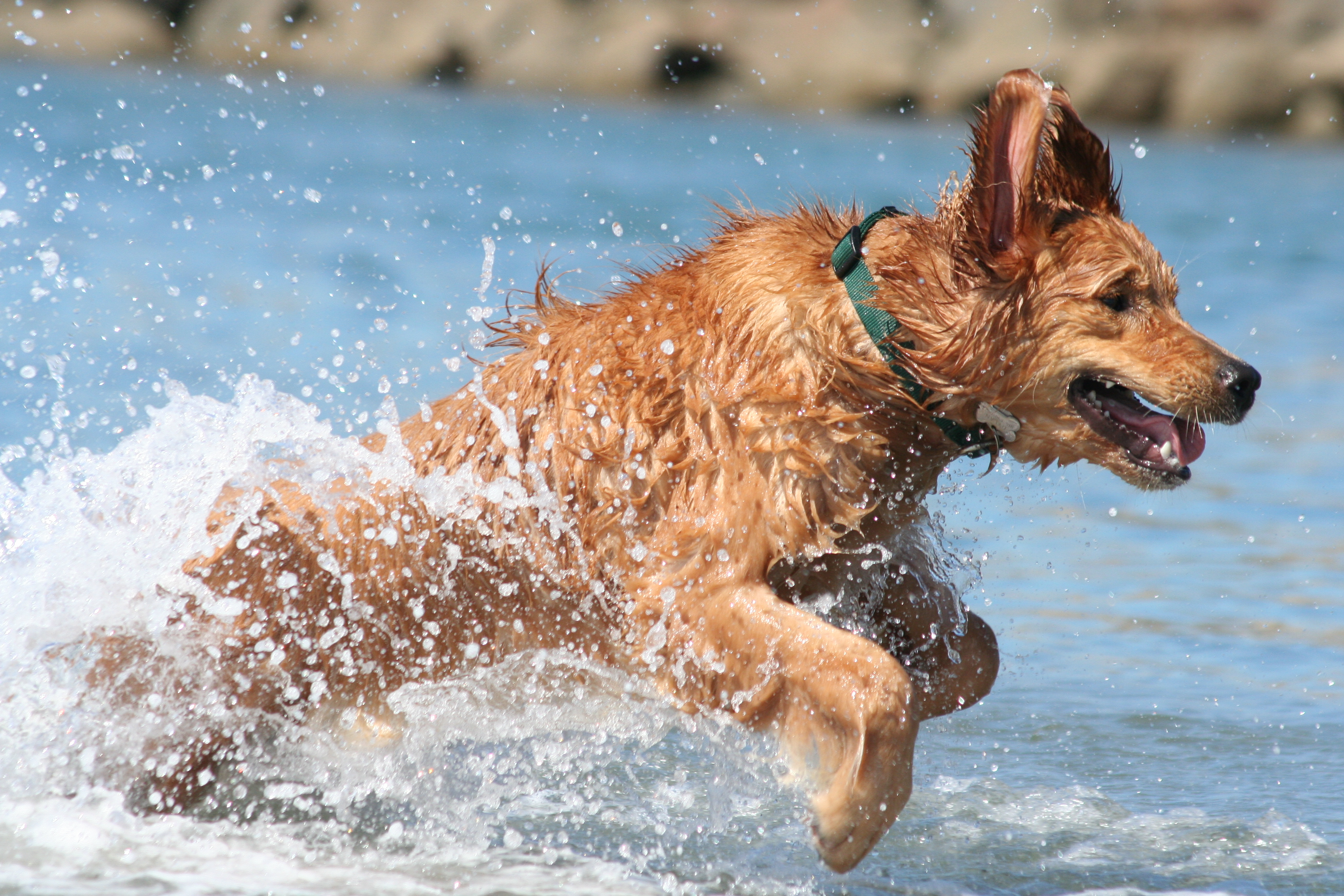
Golden Retriever charge. This dog was originally bred in Scotland to hunt in marshy conditions.

- American Cocker Spaniel
- American Water Spaniel
- Barbet
- Boykin Spaniel
- Blackmouth Cur
- Blue Lacy
- Brittany
- Clumber Spaniel
- Dutch Partridge Dog
- English Cocker Spaniel
- English Setter
- English Springer Spaniel
- Épagneul Bleu de Picardie
- Epagneul Pont-Audemer
- Frisian Pointer (stabyhoun/stabij)
- German Longhaired Pointer
- German Shorthaired Pointer
- German Wirehaired Pointer
- German Water Spaniel
- Gordon Setter
- Hungarian Vizsla
- Hungarian Wirehaired Vizsla
- Italian Spinone
- Irish Setter
- Irish Water Spaniel
- Newfoundland
- Pointer
- Poodle
- Portuguese Water Dog
- Spanish Water Dog
- Sussex Spaniel
- Tibetan Terrier
- Weimaraner
- Welsh Springer Spaniel
- Wire-haired Pointing Griffon

== See also ==
- List of dog breeds
- Field trial
- Hunt test
- St. John's water dog, also known as the Lesser Newfoundland, an extinct precursor of the Newfoundland dog and ancestor of the modern Retrievers, including Flat-coated, Chesapeake Bay, Golden, and Labrador.
