= Upland hunting =

Method of bird hunting

Upland hunting is an American term for a form of bird hunting (fowling) in which the hunter pursues upland birds including quail, pheasant, grouse, woodcock, prairie chicken, chukar, grey partridge, and other landfowls. Unlike aquatic and semiaquatic bird species (waterfowls and shorebirds), upland birds are terrestrial and tend to be found strictly on the dry lands above the high mark of waterbodies, often hidden in heavy groundcover, so hunters generally employ the use of gun dogs to locate, expose and retrieve game. The average group consists of 2-4 hunters with 1-2 dogs.

Depending upon their method of work, some dogs (pointers and setters) are tasked to detect game, and some (spaniels) to purposefully startle ("flush") game. When the birds are forced to flee out of concealment and into the open, either by the hunter or the dog, the hunter then attempts to shoot down the birds on the wing, also known as wingshooting. Once downed, the game is usually either incapacitated or immobilized, and is then retrieved with a dog (retrievers) or by the hunter himself.

== Equipment ==
Upland hunters use all types of shotguns from break-action single-shots to semi-automatics, calibered from .410 bore through to 12-gauge. The quintessential shotgun for upland hunting is a double-barrel shotgun in a smaller gauge such as a 16-, 20- or 28-gauge, using small round pellets known as birdshots, which are also commonly used in duck hunting.

Hunters often wear specialized vests with external hardpoints and/or hooks to carry collected games, though there is a trend toward more functional technical daypacks specifically designed for the demands of more rigorous upland hunting in remote areas. In North America some states such as Alabama and Arkansas require upland hunters to wear blaze orange clothing for safety.

== Dogs ==
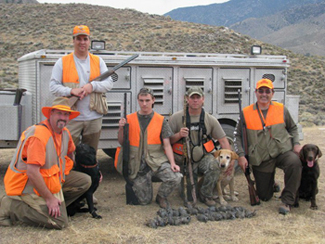

Upland hunters work specially trained gun dogs to find game. Spaniels and pointing breeds are used most often, though retrievers are worked with considerable success when hunting pheasant in many areas.

Upland hunters traditionally walk when finding game, though quail hunters in the southern states often employ buggies or vehicles due to the sparseness of game. Because of the large area that must be covered in order to find bobwhite quail, many hunters employ specially designed hunting buggies to haul gears and kennels for fresh dogs. On the other hand, chukar and grey partridge hunters of much of the western regions will hunt with one or two dogs on the ground for the duration of the hunt, hiking 8+ miles of steep mountainous terrain in a single hunt with well-conditioned dogs.

== Location ==
Pheasant hunting, the most popular form of upland hunting takes place primarily in open fields which provides cover for birds. Upland birds can be hunted in a wide variety of habitats from deserts to high mountain elevations. This variety of locations is part of what makes upland hunting so popular. Some states such as South Dakota derive a significant portion of their revenue from upland hunters who travel into the state to take advantage of the ideal fauna. Numerous pheasant hunting lodges are prevalent throughout South Dakota, most of them in the eastern half of the state.

Upland birds are found throughout the United States and much of the world, although it is most popular (by number of participants) in the United States. There are two different ways that hunters can approach upland hunting, the more challenging way is hunting wild birds in less populated parts of the country especially the Midwest; the second way is hunting farmed birds.

Popular game birds by region in the United States:

- Northeast — ruffed grouse and American woodcock
- Southeast — bobwhite quail and American woodcock
- Midwest/Prairie — ring-necked pheasant, greater prairie chicken, huns and sharp-tailed grouse
- North Woods — ruffed grouse and American woodcock
- Intermountain West — chukar partridge, dusky grouse, huns, sage-grouse, sharp-tailed grouse, and white-tailed ptarmigan
- Southwestern United States — quail
