= Drentse Patrijshond =

Drentsche Patrijshond
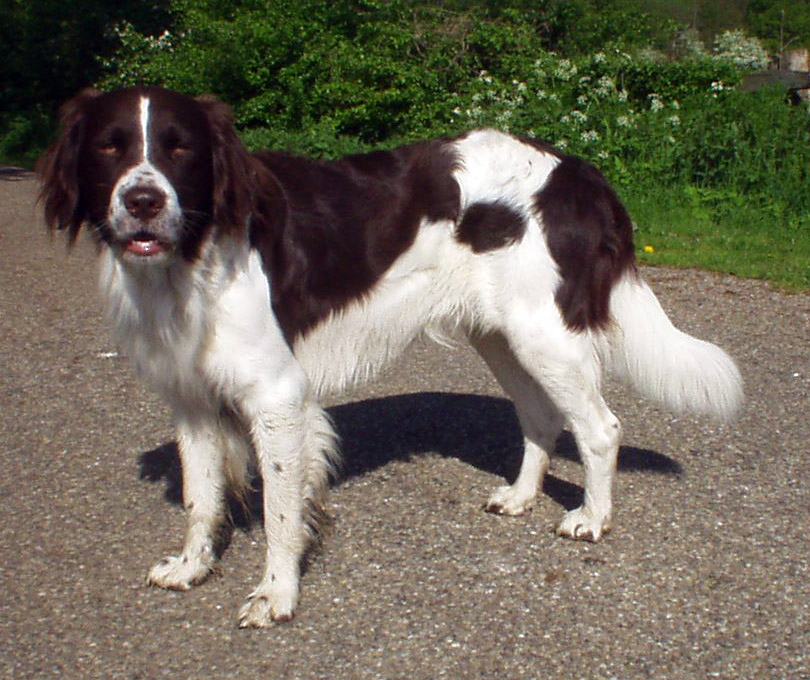
- Drentsche Patrijshond
- Other names: Dutch Partridge Dog; Drentsche Patrijshond; Drent
- Origin: Netherlands
Traits
Height	Males	58–63 cm (23–25 in)
	Females	55–60 cm (22–24 in)
- Coat: The coat is dense, but not really long.
- Color: White with brown markings
Kennel club standards
- Dutch Kennel Club: standard
- Fédération Cynologique Internationale: standard

The Drentsche Patrijshond is a versatile pointer-type hunting dog from the Dutch province of Drenthe. Called the Dutch Partridge Dog (or "Drent" for Drenthe) in English, approximately 5,000 dogs are registered with the breed club in the Netherlands, and breed clubs operate in Belgium, Denmark, Scandinavia and North America. The Drentsche Patrijshond bears some resemblance to both spaniel and setter types of dog. An excellent pointer and retriever, this dog is often used to hunt fowl and adapts equally well to the field or marshes.

== Appearance ==
Valid color is white with brown markings. Mostly white with large brown plates (spots). There should be no white touching the eye or on the ears. There is usually one plate that covers the backside above the tail. A mantle (large marking across the back) is permissible, but generally less desired. The coat is medium long, with feathers on the leg and longer hair on the front of the chest, giving the impression of a longer-haired coat. The Drentsche Patrijshond is 55 to 63 cm (21.5 to 25 in). at the withers. The breed weighs 55-73 pounds on average.

== History ==
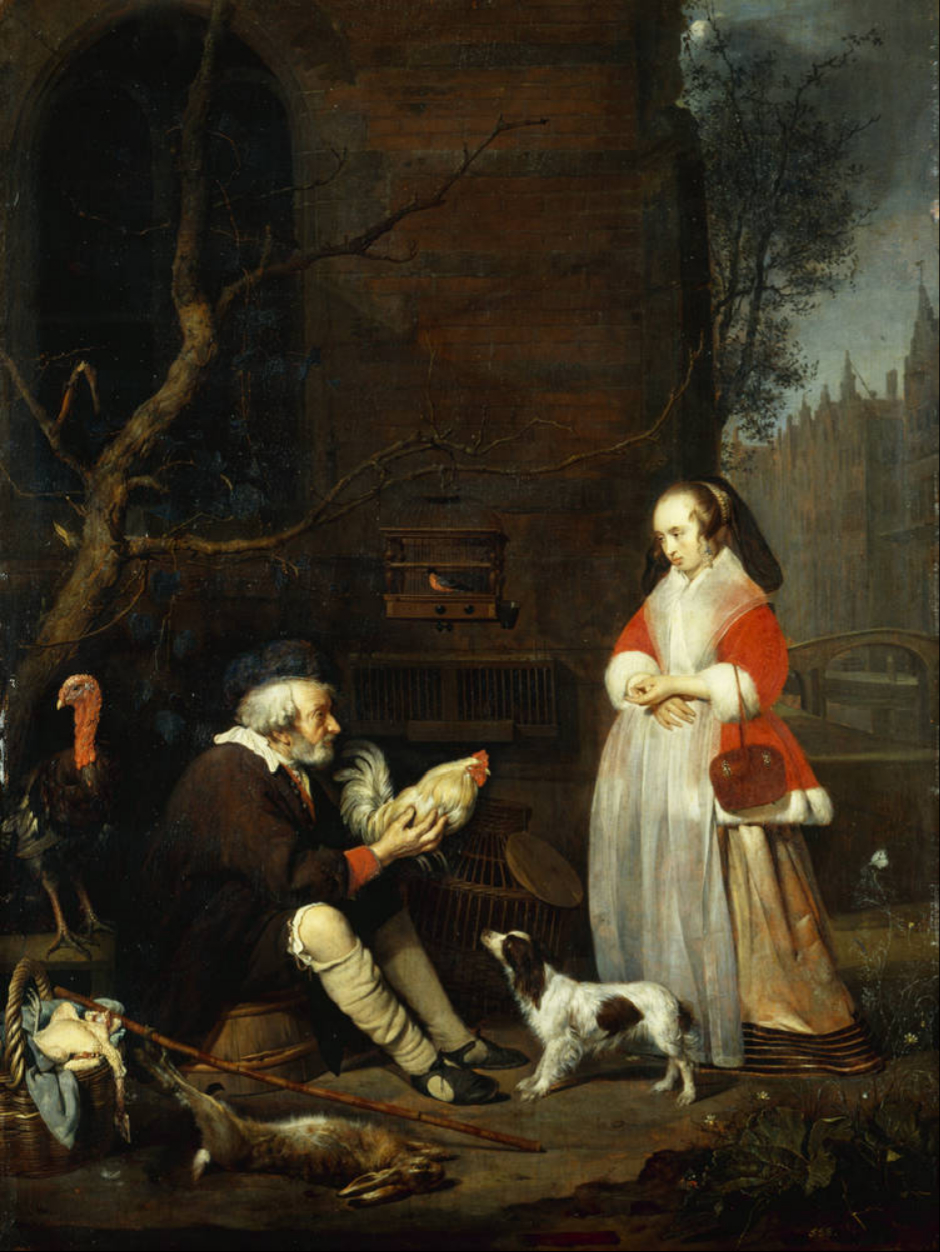
The Poultry seller by Gabriel Metsu, 1662

The origins of the Drentsche Patrijshond are in the 16th century, from the Spioenen (or Spanjoelen) which came to the Netherlands through France from Spain, and is related to the Small Münsterländer of Germany and the Epagneul Français of France. In the Netherlands, these dogs were called partridge dogs.

The presence of the partridge dogs had been visible for centuries, as in the 17th-century painting The Hunter's Present, c. 1658–60, by Gabriel Metsu. In the painting, the partridge dog leans against the hunter's knee, as the man is handing a woman a partridge, which was a double entendre at the time. The dog in The Hunter's Present is a very large, stocky dog that could possibly pull a cart; showing the range of the early type, a much smaller, lighter dog of the same type is shown in another painting by the same artist, The Poultry seller, 1662. This painting also involves a woman being offered a bird, regarded with suspicion by her dog.

Before formal recognition as a breed in 1943, the type had been kept separate from other dogs as an undocumented breed for centuries in the rural province of Drenthe. As the Drentsche Patrijshond is a breed developed in the Netherlands, the breed standard was first developed and approved in 1943 by the Raad van Beheer op Kynologisch Gebied (Dutch Kennel Club), the Fédération Cynologique Internationale national kennel club for the Netherlands. The Fédération Cynologique Internationale recognised the breed using the standard developed by the breed's country of origin as the standard to be used in international competition. The United Kennel Club in the United States also recognises the breed using the outdated (February 1994) Fédération Cynologique Internationale standard.

In November 2010, the AKC added the Drentsche Patrijshond to the AKC Foundation Stock Service Program, allowing owners of registered Drents to participate in AKC sanctioned events such as hunt tests and agility competitions, starting in 2011.

== Use ==
The province of Drenthe 300 years ago was unusual, in that it allowed the common gentry the right to hunt. The local mayor, the farmer, and landowners in general developed dogs to support their pursuit of various small game. Unlike many other hunting breeds, which were developed by, and for, the elite or nobility only to hunt, the Drentsche Patrijshond was expected to hunt all game, and also pull duty as watch dog, child playmate, etc. Some were even used to pull the dog-carts of the day. For over 300 years, the Drentsche Patrijshond type has been an all-around dog.

Bred to be a fast and thorough walk-up (upland) hunter, the Drentsche can hunt both birds and small mammals, including rabbit, hare and fox. As with most European breeds, the Drentsche Patrijshond points and retrieves. Today, the Drentsche is a common pick amongst gun dogs throughout its native country of the Netherlands, with approximately 5,000 dogs registered with the breed club.

== Health ==
Breed health concerns may include progressive retinal atrophy (PRA) and hereditary stomatocytosis. It is recommended that responsible breeders screen for hip dysplasia, elbow dysplasia, and hereditary eye disorders such as PRA prior to breeding.

== Temperament ==
Though the breed shows a strong hunting instinct in the field, and can be quite driven, these dogs tend to be more relaxed in the home than many of the hunting breeds. They are strongly attached to family members, loyal, and of sweet disposition, particularly with children.

== Exercise ==
The Drentse Patrijshond enjoys working alongside a hunter and spending time with people outdoors. Several brisk walks around the park can also meet its exercise needs. Although it will come home and quietly assume its position on its bed, the breed should not be considered sedentary, as it requires sufficient exercise.

== See also ==
- List of dog breeds
- Schapendoes, another breed originating in Drenthe
- Rijksmuseum
- Common pheasant
