= Pont-Audemer Spaniel =

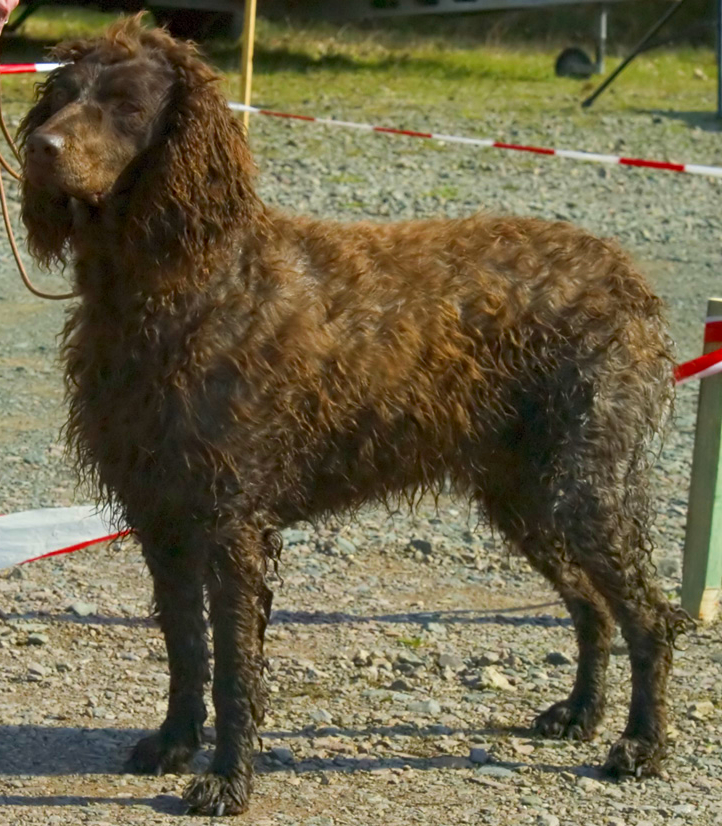
- Other names: Epagneul Pont-Audemer; Setter of Pont-Audemer
- Origin: France
Kennel club standards
- Société Centrale Canine: standard
- Fédération Cynologique Internationale: standard

The Pont-Audemer Spaniel or Epagneul Pont-Audemer is a rare breed of French gundog. It originated in the nineteenth century from different breeds of water spaniels, and took more of a setter role in hunting than that of a traditional spaniel. Following the Second World War, the breed's numbers dropped so low that the breed club decided to allow cross breeding with other breeds because of fears of the existing stock becoming overly inbred. In 1980, the breed club was merged with that of the Picardy Spaniel.

== History ==
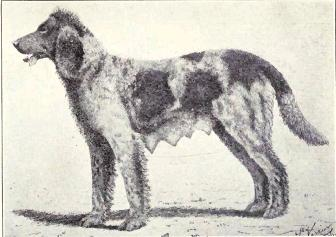
A Pont-Audemer Spaniel, 1915

The breed is alleged to have been developed in the Pont-Audemer region of France in the nineteenth century. While the exact origin of the breed isn't known, it is thought that stock from both the English Water Spaniel and Irish Water Spaniels may have played a part in the breed's original makeup. In the early 20th century, outside France, they were considered more useful as a setter than doing typical spaniel type work.

The breed's numbers were never large, and so few examples existed after World War II that in 1949 the President of the Pont-Audemer breed club in France allowed for other breeds, including the Irish Water Spaniel, to cross-breed with the existing population in order to alleviate the risk of inbreeding what few Pont-Audemer Spaniels remained. However the breed's population remained low, and in 1980 at the recommendation of the Société Centrale Canine, the Pont-Audemer breed club was merged with that of the Picardy Spaniel.

The Pont-Audermer Spaniel is recognized by the Fédération Cynologique Internationale, the international kennel association. It is recognised in the United States by the United Kennel Club, in the club's Gundog Group. Other breed registries that recognize the Pont-Audemer include the Continental Kennel Club, the International Canine Kennel Club, and the American Rare Breed Association.

== Description ==
The Pont-Audemer Spaniel is a medium-sized dog, weighing 44 to 60 pounds (20–27 kg), and standing around 50–58 centimetres (20–23 in) at the withers. It is different from most sporting dog breeds in the US and UK in its length, and the pointed quality of the muzzle. The Pont-Audemer Spaniel's coat is curly or, at the very least, quite wavy, but smooth around the face. The most common pattern is brown and white roan but a solid brown coat is also acceptable. Both coat patterns can have red-brown “dead leaf glints”. Black or tan markings are faults. The hair on the face is short. The topknot can take up to five years to fully develop. Most Pontos have docked tails. Tails that are left intact are usually well feathered like that of a setter, although it is not unheard of for a Ponto to have the shorthaired “rat-tail” of an Irish Water Spaniel.

== Temperament ==
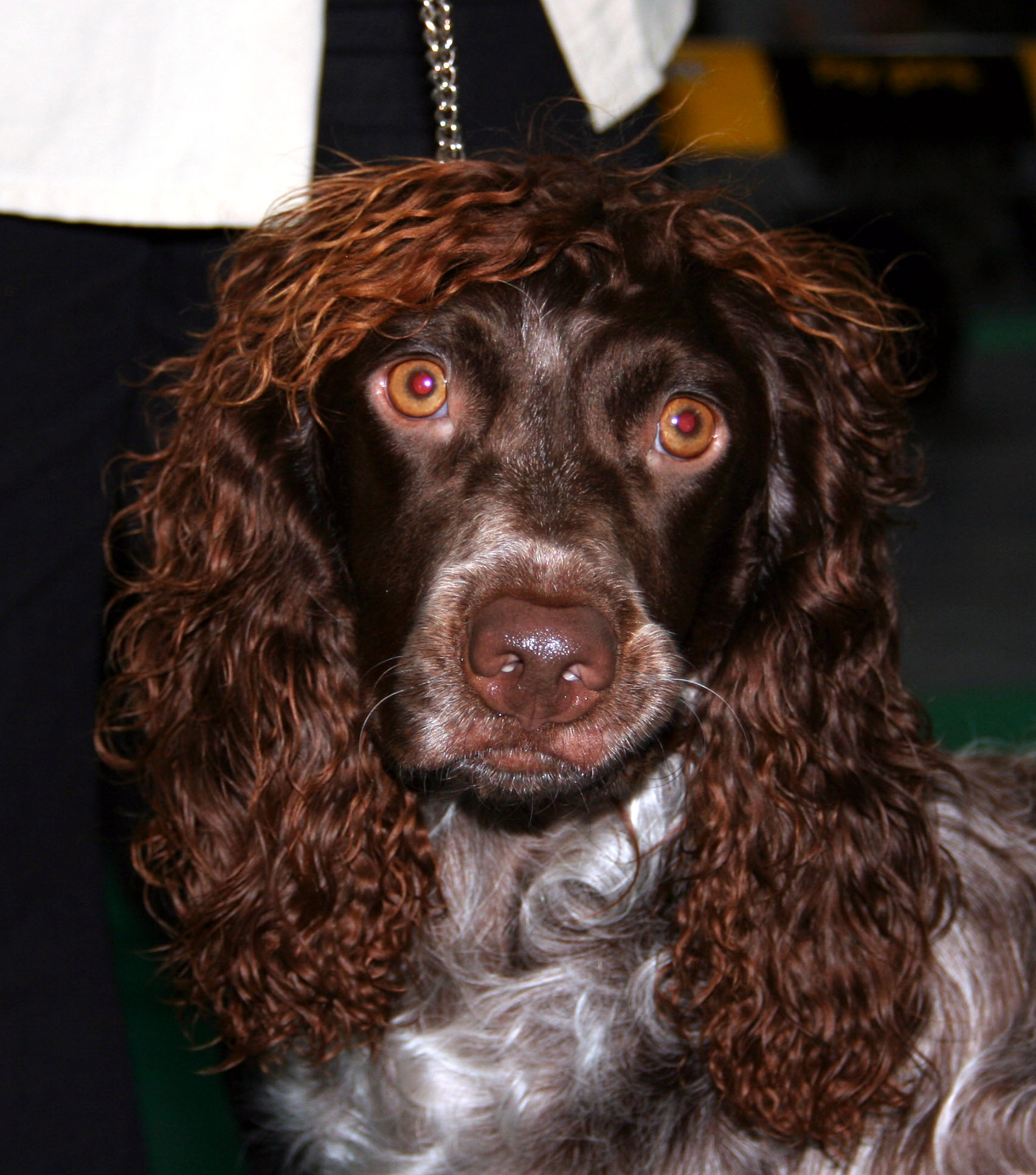
Head of a Pont-Audemer Spaniel

Though hardy, as well as hard-working, the breed has the typical spaniel traits of being easy to train, gentle, and affectionate. The dogs are known to have a fun-loving quality and in France are said to be le petit clown des marais (the little clown of the marshes).

Pont-Audemer Spaniels are usually found in a working gundog environment, and are rarely kept as mere family pets. The dogs specialize as water dogs. At the start of the 20th century they were prized for their use in hunting wild ducks in either the water or marshy conditions. They remain used in France in various terrain, and used for hunting rabbits or pheasants.

== Health ==
Alopecia has been reported in the Pont-Audemer Spaniel, appearing first between the ages of seven and eighteen months. The ears and nose areas are primarily affected. Biopsies on the affected animals showed that damage to the root sheath and clumping of pigment in hair shafts were the main reasons for the condition. Tests conducted ruled out endocrine related causes such as hyperthyroidism.

== See also ==
- List of dog breeds
