= Alanorarius =

Keeper of spaniels for hunting and falconry

In ancient European customs, an alanorarius was a keeper or manager of spaniels, or setting-dogs, for the sports of hunting and falconry.

The word is formed from the Gothic Alan, a greyhound.
