= Brittany Spaniel =

French breed of dog

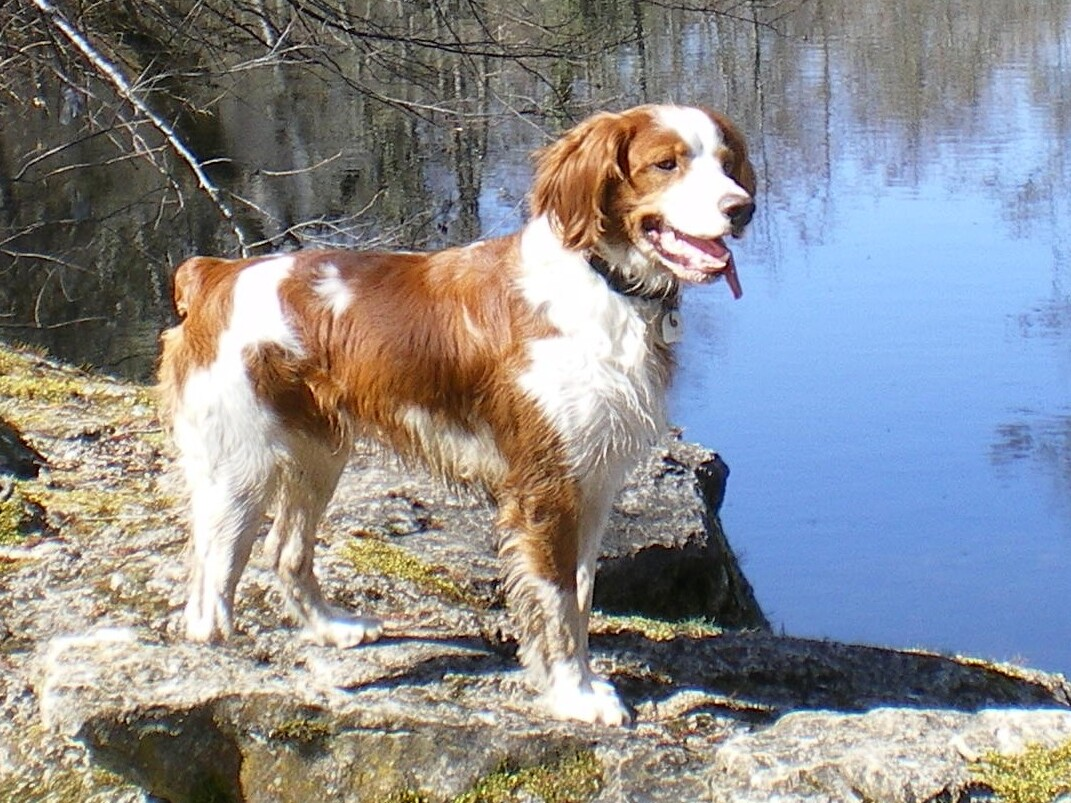

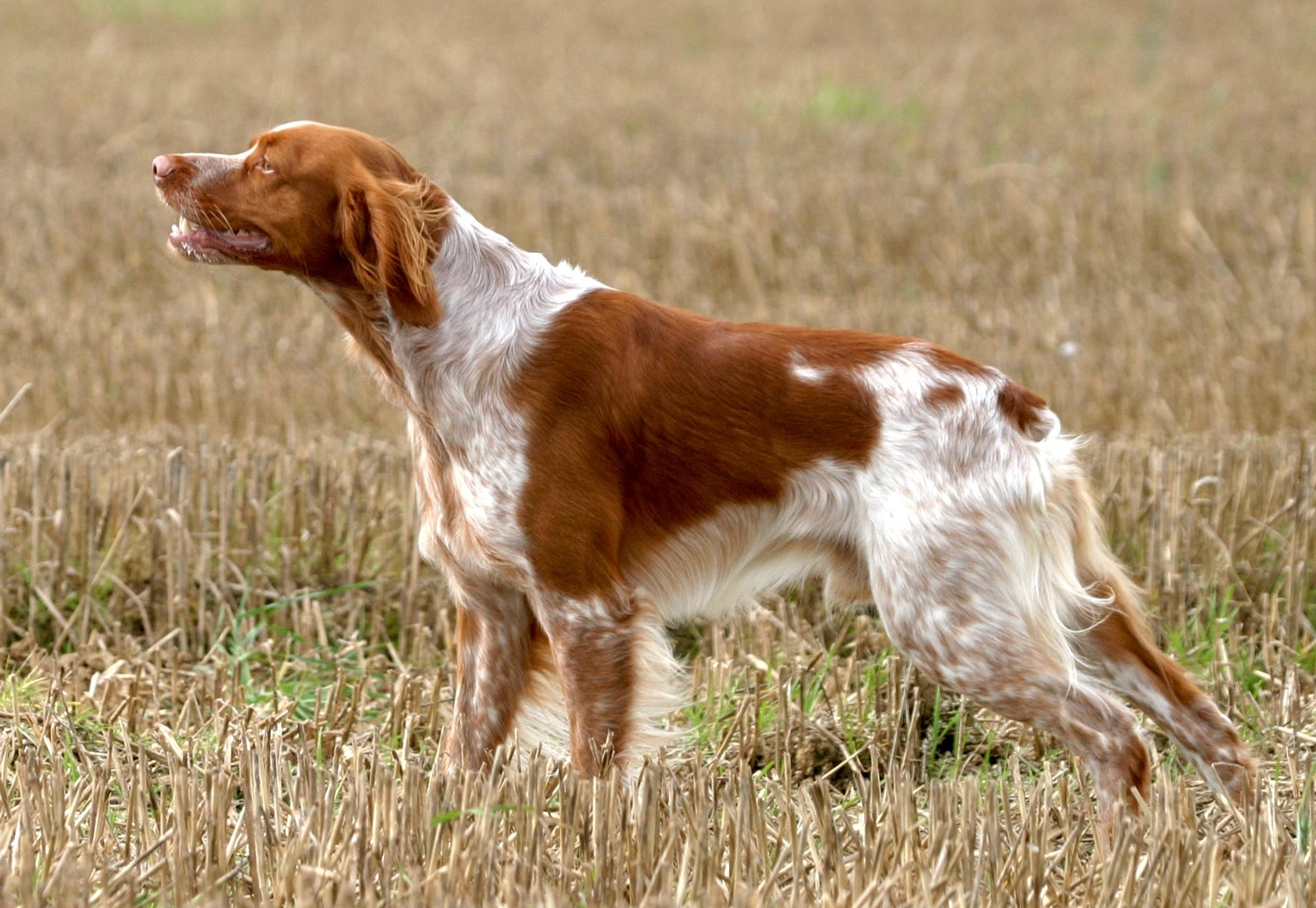
- On point for partridge
- Other names: Breton Spaniel; Épagneul Breton; American Brittany; Brittany; French Brittany
- Origin: France
Traits
- Height: 47–51 cm
- Coat: medium length, flowing
- Colour: piebald orange-and-white, liver-and-white or black-and-white; orange, liver or black roan; tricoloured
- Litter size: average 5
Kennel club standards
- Société Centrale Canine: standard
- Fédération Cynologique Internationale: standard

The Brittany Spaniel or Breton Spaniel (French: Épagneul Breton) is a French breed of gun dog of spaniel type, bred primarily for bird hunting. In the United States it may be called simply Brittany.

It developed between the seventeenth and nineteenth centuries in Brittany in north-west France, and was officially recognised early in the twentieth. It is one of five French breeds of spaniel, the others being the Épagneul Bleu de Picardie, the Épagneul de Pont-Audemer, the Épagneul Français and the Épagneul Picard.

== History ==
The Brittany Spaniel originated in the Brittany region of north-western France, for which it is named. Scenes of orange-and-white dogs of similar type hunting and retrieving game appear in tapestries and paintings from the seventeenth century. The earliest written description of such dogs is that of Reverend Davies in 1850, where he described hunting with small "bobtailed" dogs who pointed and were excellent retrievers. It was around the same time that the modern breed to have been bred by mating with English Setters.

The Breton was first recognised as a breed in 1907 when an orange-and-white dog named Boy was registered in France. As a result, the first standards were outlined in the same year. It was approved by the American Kennel Club in 1934; in 1982 the "Spaniel" was officially dropped from the name.

== Characteristics ==
The Breton Spaniel has a spaniel-type head, a bob-tail, and cobby appearance.

The tail may be short or completely absent, or may be of normal length – in which case it is usually carried more or less horizontal. Where legal, it may be docked to a length of between 3 and 6 cm; the Épagneul Breton is not on the list of breeds that may participate in shows of the Fédération Cynologique Internationale with a docked tail.

The coat may be black-and-white, orange-and-white or liver-and-white, either pied or roan, or may be tri-coloured; solid colours are not accepted.

=== American type ===
The American Brittany has been bred differently from the French and international Brittany Spaniel, and is somewhat larger than the original breed. It is a medium-sized dog, standing (44–52 cm (17.5–20.5 in) at the withers according to the American Kennel Club standard, tending to be larger and have a blockier head than the original French breed; body weights are between 14–18 kg (30–40 lb). The dogs are generally smaller than setters but leggier than spaniels. The American Brittany standard specifies an acceptable tri-colour of liver, orange, and white with very specific colour placement.

== Health ==
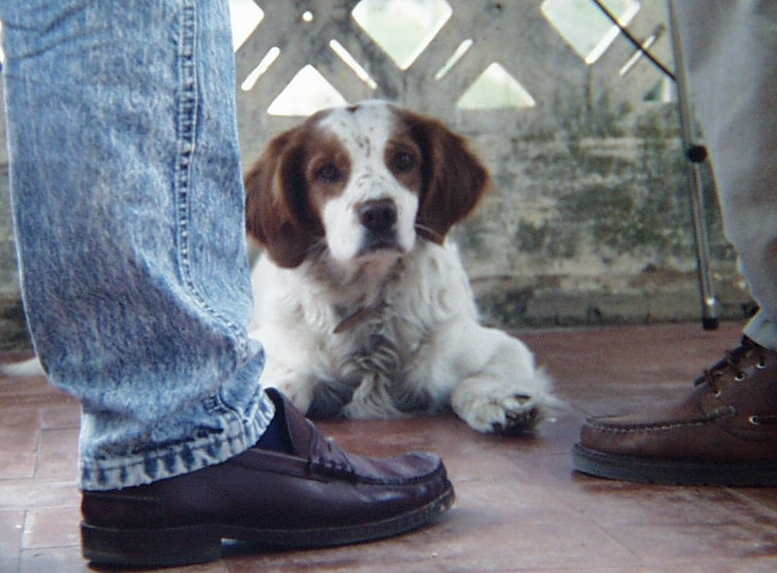
A puppy

A 2015 French study found an median longevity of 12.6 years. A 2024 UK study found a median longevity of 11.1 years for the breed, lower than the average of 12.5 for all dogs.

A North American study looking at over a million dogs found the dogs to be predisposed to hip dysplasia with an incidence of 4.22% compared to 3.52% overall. Another North American study looking at over 250,000 elbow records found the Brittany to have the fourteenth-lowest rate of elbow dysplasia of 60 breeds, with an incidence of 1.7%.

A North American study found it to have a higher-than-average incidence of glaucoma, at 0.95% compared to 0.89% overall.

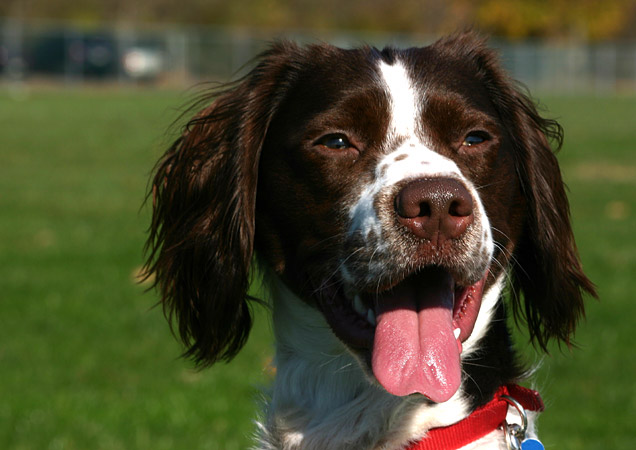
Liver-and-white

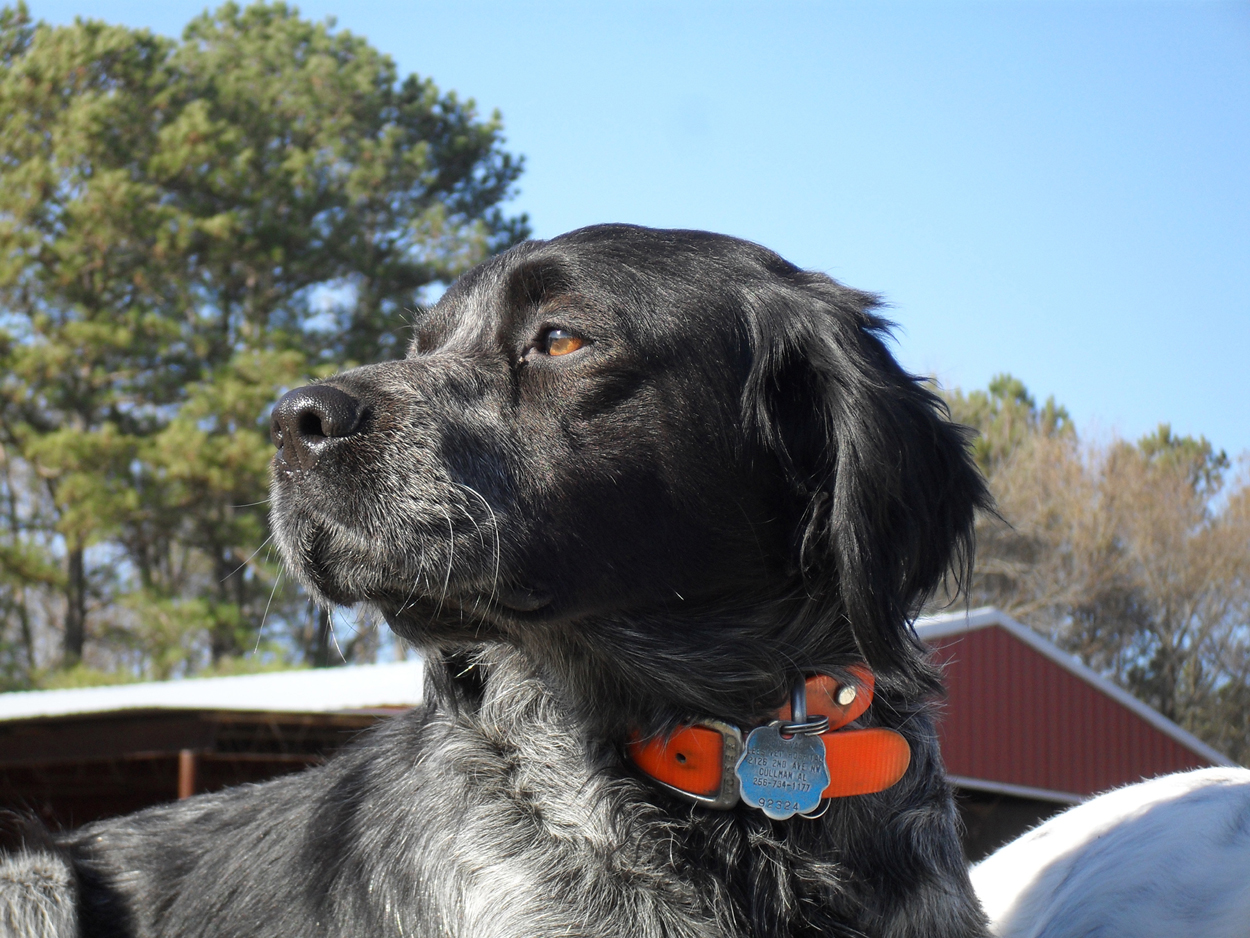
Black-and-white roan

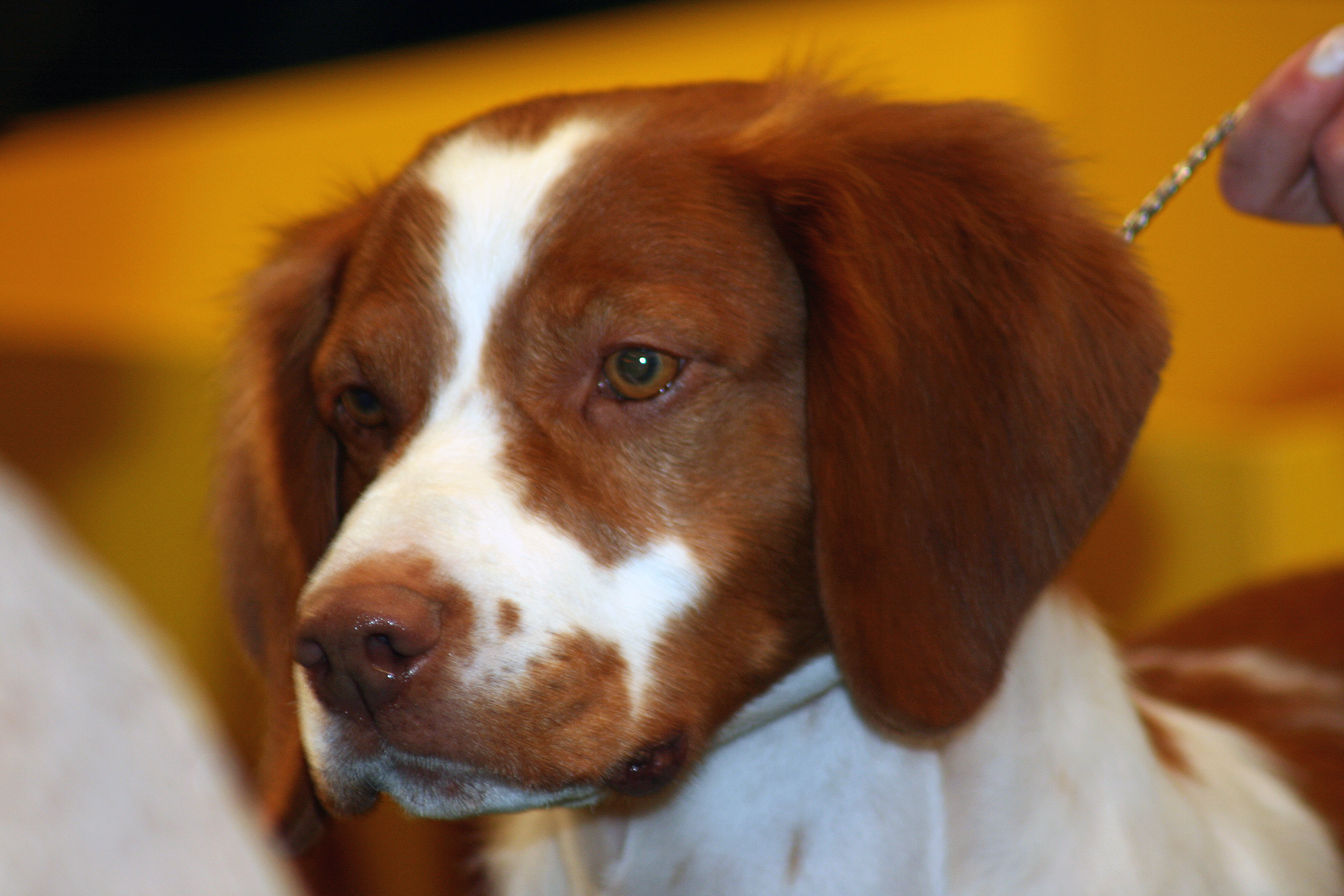
Orange-and-white
