= Canadian Kennel Club =

Canadian purebread dog organization

- Abbreviation: CKC
- Type: Kennel club
- Legal status: Active
- Region served: Canada
- Website: ckc.ca

The Canadian Kennel Club (or CKC; French: Club canin canadien), founded in 1888 and chartered under the Animal Purebred Act, is one of the national kennel clubs of Canada. It maintains breed registries services for those purebred dogs approved for its control by Agriculture and Agri-Food Canada, and provides governance for all CKC-approved dog conformation shows, dog trials and canine events. The CKC is a non-member partner with the Fédération Cynologique Internationale.

== History ==
The Canadian Kennel Club was founded in 1888, in London, Ontario. The first registered dog was Forest Fern, an English setter. The club's official publication, The Kennel Gazette, was first released in 1889. Until the 1990s, it accepted nose printing as a form of identification for registered dogs.

By the early 2000s, the CKC registered over 70,000 dogs per year, and approved of over 600 all-breed show annually.

=== Relationship with American Kennel Club ===
Early in the CKC's history, it formed a partnership with the American Kennel Club. Until 1894, the AKC allowed dogs to be shown in both countries without requiring registration with both clubs. Even after ending this policy, the AKC continued to uphold suspensions and cancellations of CKC registries. The CKC notably recognized several breeds, such as the Greenland dog and Karelian bear dog, years before the AKC did. In 2026, the AKC began recognizing CKC titles earned in the Conformation, Obedience, and Rally categories.

== Activities ==
=== Conformation showing ===
In the Canadian Kennel Club, a Champion dog is one that has won 10 points. A major is not required. Canadian show classes include Junior Puppy (for dogs aged 6 to 9 months), Senior Puppy (9 to 12 months), 12 to 18 Months, Canadian Bred, Bred By Exhibitor, Open, and Special Only. In addition, puppies can earn Best Puppy in Breed and Best Puppy in Show awards; the rules define "puppy" as a dog under 12 months of age.

A judge is allowed to disqualify a dog if its colour has been enhanced by dye, chalk, or other substances. Overuse of hairspray can also result in disqualification. However, this is a "judgement call", and the presence alone of an enhancement does not necessarily lead to disqualification.

=== Other events ===
The CKC also hosts agility, obedience, rally, and scent detection competitions. Mixed-breed dogs are allowed to participate in these. Other CKC sports include beagle-only scent trials, herding trials, retriever hunt tests, and Earthdog trials.

== Controversy ==
In a paper for the Canadian Veterinary Journal, Arman Koharik criticized the CKC's standards, which allow inbreeding, claiming that the dogs it allows to join are "caricatures of the original breeds." He argued that the club should set a minimum number of dogs as the foundation for a breed in order to prevent the health defects associated with inbreeding.

In 2020, CKC breeder Brenda Cormeau-Watson claimed that the club's Puppy List included breeders whose dogs failed to meet breed standards. She alleged that some of these breeders imported dogs from European puppy mills while claiming that they were Canadian-bred. French bulldogs were said to be the breed most affected by these practices, owing to their popularity. The club asserted that most of its breeders were legitimate, but admitted that there were "bad apples", and that breeders on the list can be investigated.

== See also ==
- List of kennel clubs
