= Spaniel =

Dog type

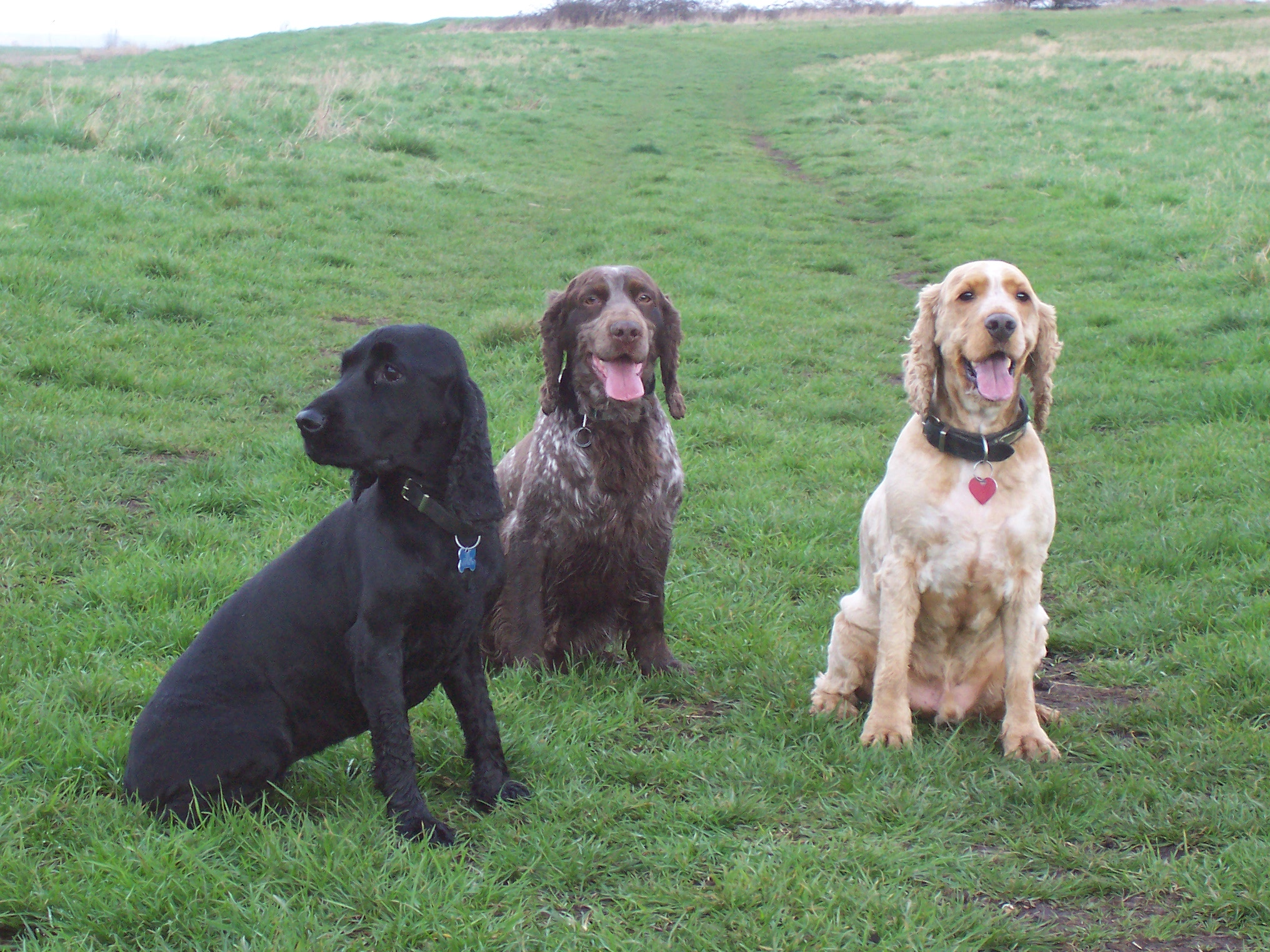
English Cocker Spaniels are small spaniels

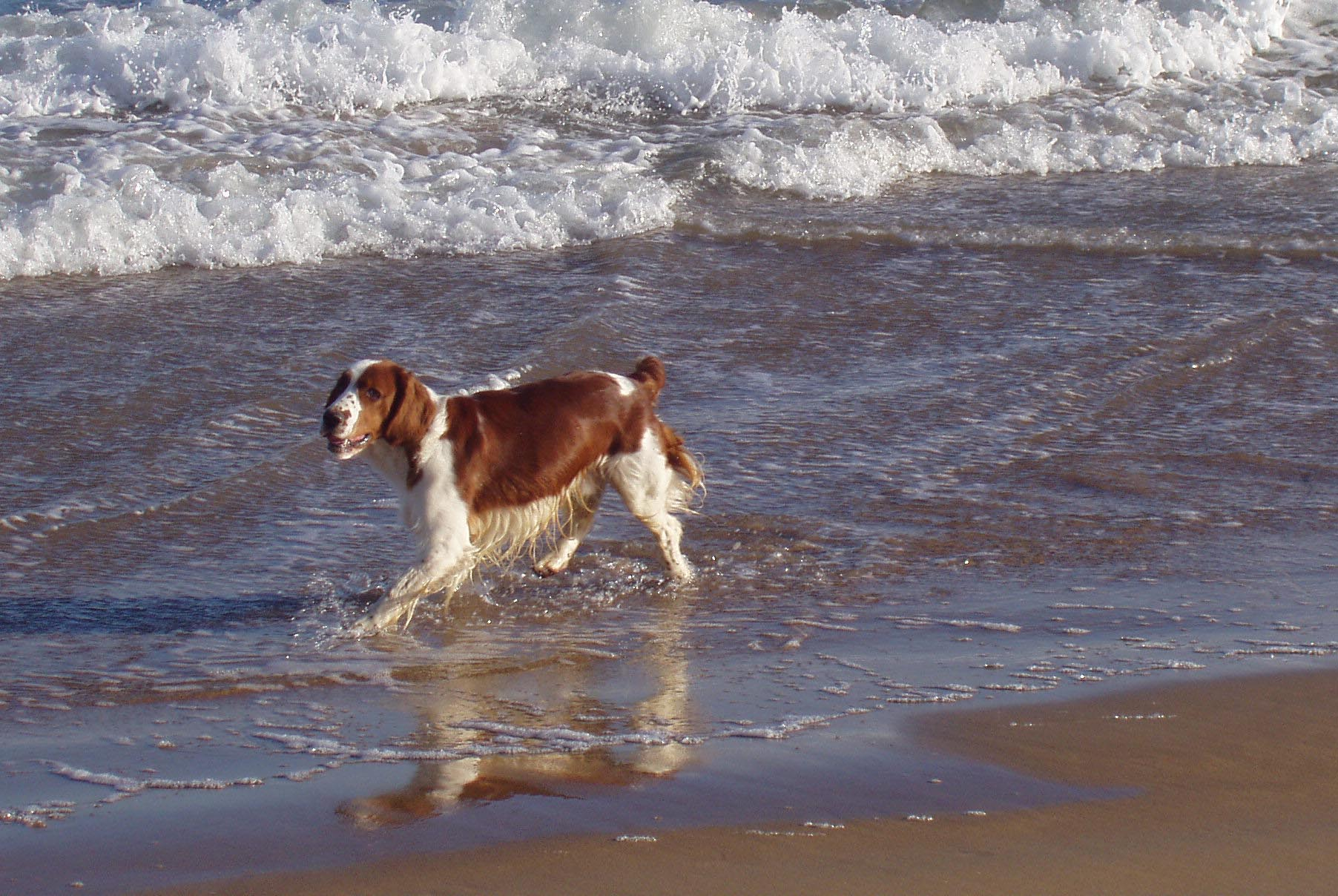
A Welsh Springer Spaniel on the beach

A spaniel is a type of gun dog. Spaniels were especially bred to flush game out of denser brush. By the late 17th century, spaniels had been specialized into water and land breeds. The extinct English Water Spaniel was used to retrieve water fowl shot down with arrows. Land spaniels were setting spaniels—those that crept forward and pointed their game, allowing hunters to ensnare them with nets, and springing spaniels — those that sprang pheasants and partridges (for hunting with falcon) and also rabbits and smaller mammals such as rats and mice (for hunting with greyhounds). During the 17th century, the role of the spaniel dramatically changed as Englishmen began hunting with flintlocks for wing shooting. Charles Goodall and Julia Gasow (1984) write that spaniels were "transformed from untrained, wild beaters, to smooth, polished gun dogs."

The word "spaniel" would seem to be derived from the medieval French espaigneul—"Spanish"—to modern French, espagnol.

== Definition and description ==
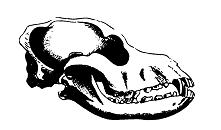
A drawing of a typical skull of a spaniel

The Oxford English Dictionary defines Spaniel as "a breed of dog with a long silky coat and drooping ears".

Not much has changed about spaniels in general over the years, as can be seen in this 1921 entry in Collier's New Encyclopedia:

Their distinguishing characteristics are a rather broad muzzle, remarkably long and full ears, hair plentiful and beautifully waved, particularly that of the ears, tail, and hinder parts of the thighs and legs. The prevailing color is liver and white, sometimes red and white or black and white, and sometimes deep brown, or black on the face and breast, with a tan spot over each eye. The English spaniel is a superior and very pure breed. The King Charles is a small variety of the spaniel used as a lapdog. The water spaniels, large and small, differ from the common spaniel only in the roughness of their coats, and in uniting the aquatic propensities of the Newfoundland dog with the fine hunting qualities of their own race. Spaniels possess a great share of intelligence, affection, and obedience, which qualities, combined with much beauty, make them highly prized as companions.

== History ==
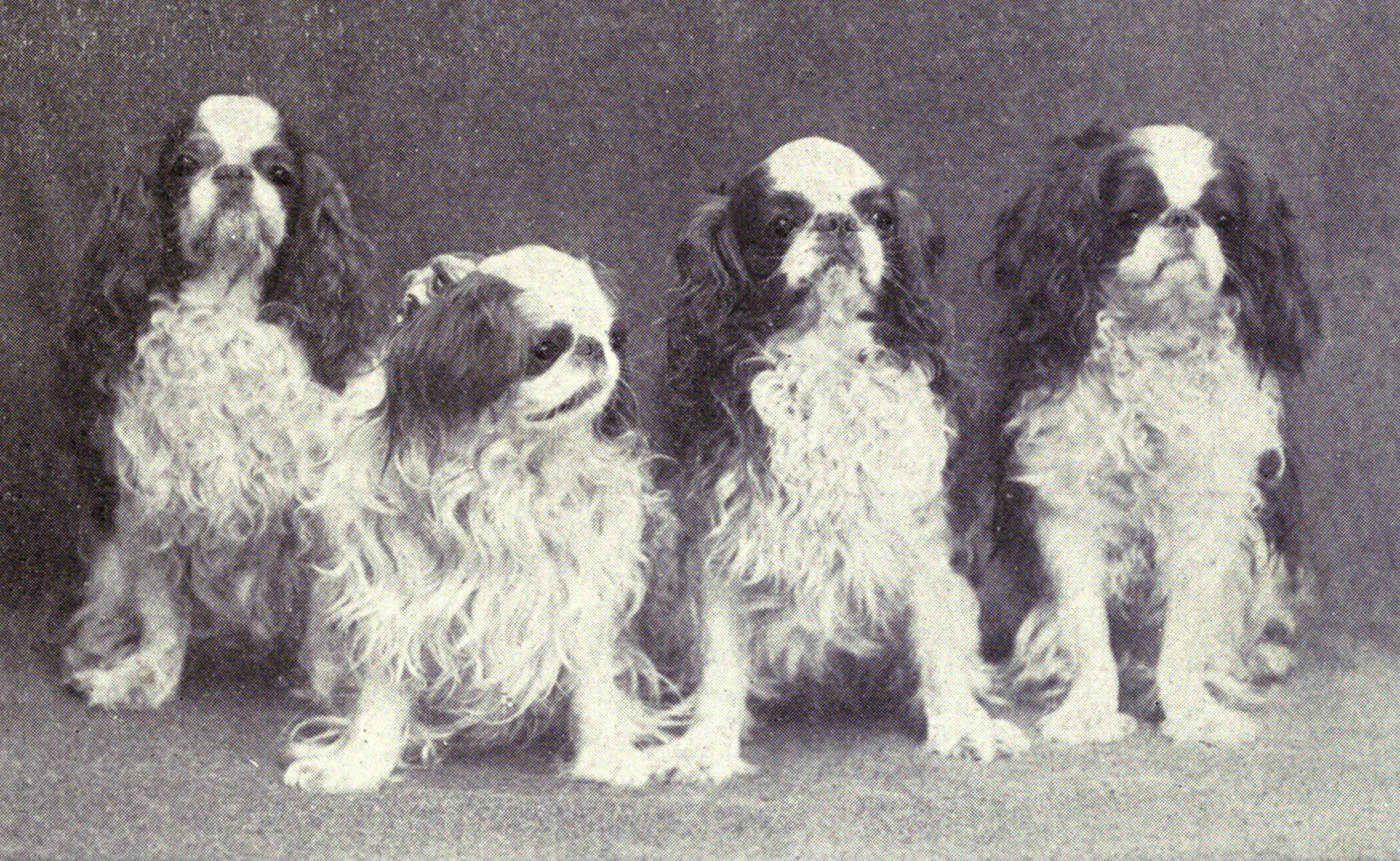
King Charles Spaniels, photographed in 1915, one of the smaller breeds, are primarily lap dogs

The origin of the word spaniel is described by the Oxford English Dictionary as coming from the Old French word espaigneul which meant "Spanish (dog)"; this in turn originated from the Latin Hispaniolus which simply means "Spanish".

In Edward, 2nd Duke of York's work The Master of Game, which was mostly a 15th-century translation of an earlier work by Gaston III of Foix-Béarn entitled Livre de chasse, spaniels are described as being from Spain as much as all Greyhounds are from England or Scotland. Sixteenth-century English physician John Caius wrote that the spaniels of the time were mostly white, marked with spots that are commonly red. He described a new variety to have come out of France, which were speckled all over with white and black, "which mingled colours incline to a marble blewe".

=== Celtic origin theory ===
In the appendices added to the 1909 re-print of Caius' work, the editors suggested that the type of dogs may have been brought into the British Isles as early as 900 BC by a branch of the Celts moving from Spain into Cornwall and on into Wales, England and Ireland. Theories on the origin of the Welsh Springer Spaniel support this theory, as it is believed that the breed specifically is a direct descendant of the "Agassian hunting dog" described in the hunting poem Cynegetica attributed to Oppian of Apamea, which belonged to the Celtic tribes of Roman Britain:

There is a strong breed of hunting dog, small in size but no less worthy of great praise. These the wild tribes of Britons with their tattooed backs rear and call by the name of Agassian. Their size is like that of worthless and greedy domestic table dogs; squat, emaciated, shaggy, dull of eye, but endowed with feet armed with powerful claws and a mouth sharp with close-set venomous tearing teeth. It is by virtue of its nose, however, that the Agassian is most exalted, and for tracking it is the best there is; for it is very adept at discovering the tracks of things that walk upon the ground, and skilled too at marking the airborne scent.

== Hunting ==
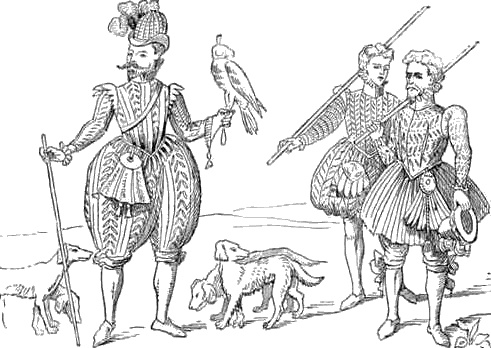
A 16th-century drawing of a hawking party with spaniels

When assisting hunters, spaniels are commonly trained to work within gun range, are steady to shot, and are able to mark the fall and retrieve shot game to hand with a soft mouth. Like most hunting dog breeds, many hunters choose spaniels that have a strong sense of smell as well. They are versatile hunters, traditionally being used for upland game birds, but are equally adept at hunting rabbits, waterfowl, rats, and mice. Due to their adaptability, spaniels are used for hunting in a wide variety of environments, including open fields, woodlands, farm lands—in briars, along fencerows and marshlands.

On the basis of function and hunting style, the Fédération Cynologique Internationale (FCI) draws a distinction between Continental and Anglo-American spaniels. The FCI places Continental dogs of the spaniel type in the pointing group (Group 7, sect. 1.2) because they function more like setters which "freeze" and point to game. Breeds in this group include the Blue Picardy Spaniel, the French Spaniel, the Brittany, the Pont-Audemer Spaniel, and the Stabyhoun. The FCI classifies most other dogs of the spaniel type as flushing or water dogs (Group 8, sections 2 and 3).

== Breeds ==
=== Contemporary ===
Breed	Also known as	Country/region of origin	Type of spaniel	Min. height	Max. height	Min. weight	Max. weight	Image
American Cocker Spaniel	Cocker Spaniel (in the United States)	United States	Flushing	13 in (33 cm)	15 in (38 cm)	24 lb (11 kg)	29 lb (13 kg)	
American Water Spaniel		United States	Flushing	15 in (38 cm)	18 in (46 cm)	25 lb (11 kg)	45 lb (20 kg)	
Blue Picardy Spaniel	Epagneul Bleu de Picardie	France	Setting	22 in (56 cm)	24 in (61 cm)	43 lb (20 kg)	45 lb (20 kg)	
Brittany	Brittany Spaniel	Brittany, France	Setting	17 in (43 cm)	20.5 in (52 cm)	30 lb (14 kg)	45 lb (20 kg)	Brittany Spaniel
Boykin Spaniel		United States	Flushing	15 in (38 cm)	18 in (46 cm)	25 lb (11 kg)	45 lb (20 kg)	
Cavalier King Charles Spaniel	Cavalier Spaniel	United Kingdom	Companion Flushing	12 in (30 cm)	13 in (33 cm)	13 lb (5.9 kg)	18 lb (8.2 kg)	
Clumber Spaniel		England	Flushing	17 in (43 cm)	20 in (51 cm)	55 lb (25 kg)	85 lb (39 kg)	
Drentse Patrijshond	Dutch Partridge Dog	Netherlands	Setting	21.5 in (55 cm)	25.5 in (65 cm)	55 lb (25 kg)	77 lb (35 kg)	
English Cocker Spaniel	Cocker Spaniel (In the United Kingdom)	England	Flushing	15 in (38 cm)	17 in (43 cm)	26 lb (12 kg)	34 lb (15 kg)	
English Springer Spaniel		England	Flushing	19 in (48 cm)	20 in (51 cm)	40 lb (18 kg)	50 lb (23 kg)	
Field Spaniel		England	Flushing	17 in (43 cm)	18 in (46 cm)	35 lb (16 kg)	50 lb (23 kg)	
French Spaniel	Épagneul français (in France)	France	Setting	21 in (53 cm)	25 in (64 cm)	45 lb (20 kg)	60 lb (27 kg)	
German Spaniel	Deutscher Wachtelhund	Germany	Setting	16 in (41 cm)	20 in (51 cm)	44 lb (20 kg)	66 lb (30 kg)	
Irish Water Spaniel	Whiptail, Shannon Spaniel, Rat Tail Spaniel, and Bog Dog	Ireland	Retriever	21 in (53 cm)	24 in (61 cm)	45 lb (20 kg)	65 lb (29 kg)	
King Charles Spaniel	English Toy Spaniel (in the United States)	England	Companion Flushing	9 in (23 cm)	10 in (25 cm)	6 lb (2.7 kg)	12 lb (5.4 kg)	
Kooikerhondje	Dutch Spaniel	Netherlands	Decoy Spitz or Pointing	14 in (36 cm)	16 in (41 cm)	20 lb (9.1 kg)	24 lb (11 kg)	
Markiesje	Dutch Tulip Hound	Netherlands	Companion Pointing	12.5 in (32 cm)	15.5 in (39 cm)	13 lb (5.9 kg)	18 lb (8.2 kg)	
Papillon	Continental Toy Spaniel, Épagneul Nain Continental	France	Companion Spitz	8 in (20 cm)	11 in (28 cm)	5 lb (2.3 kg)	10 lb (4.5 kg)	
Phalène	Continental Toy Spaniel, Épagneul Nain Continental	Belgium	Companion Spitz	8 in (20 cm)	11 in (28 cm)	5 lb (2.3 kg)	10 lb (4.5 kg)	
Picardy Spaniel	Épagneul Picard	France	Setting	22 in (56 cm)	23.5 in (60 cm)	44 lb (20 kg)	55 lb (25 kg)	
Pont-Audemer Spaniel	Épagneul Pont-Audemer	France	Setting	20 in (51 cm)	23 in (58 cm)	40 lb (18 kg)	53 lb (24 kg)	
Russian Spaniel	Russian hunting spaniel (Русский охотничий спаниель)	Russia	Flushing	15 in (38 cm)	17 in (43 cm)	28 lb (13 kg)	40 lb (18 kg)	
Stabyhoun	Frisian Pointer	Netherlands	Setting	19.6 in (50 cm)	21 in (53 cm)	30 lb (14 kg)	50 lb (23 kg)	
Sussex Spaniel		England	Flushing	13 in (33 cm)	15 in (38 cm)	35 lb (16 kg)	44 lb (20 kg)	
Welsh Springer Spaniel	Llamgi Cymru, Tarfgi Cymru	Wales	Flushing	17 in (43 cm)	19 in (48 cm)	35 lb (16 kg)	55 lb (25 kg)	

=== Extinct ===
Type of spaniel	Country/region of origin	Period of extinction	Image
Alpine Spaniel	Switzerland	1830s	
English Water Spaniel	England	1930s	
Norfolk Spaniel	England	1902	
Toy Trawler Spaniel	United Kingdom	1920s	
Tweed Water Spaniel	England	19th century	
Manilla Spaniel	Philippines	Early 20th century	

=== Misnamed ===
The following breeds are not true spaniels, but are named as such due to their resemblance to the spaniels.

Type of spaniel	Also known as	Country/region of origin	Min. height	Max. height	Min. weight	Max. weight	Image
Japanese Chin	Japanese Spaniel	Japan	9 in (23 cm)	10 in (25 cm)	4 lb (1.8 kg)	11 lb (5.0 kg)	
Pekingese	Chinese Spaniel	China	8 in (20 cm)	9 in (23 cm)	8 lb (3.6 kg)	14 lb (6.4 kg)	
Tibetan Spaniel		Tibet	9 in (23 cm)	11 in (28 cm)	9 lb (4.1 kg)	15 lb (6.8 kg)	

== See also ==
- List of dog breeds
- Alanorarius, a keeper of spaniels
- Hunting dog
- Dog type

== General and cited references ==
- Fogle, Bruce (2006). Dogs. Eyewitness Companion Guides. DK Adult. ISBN 978-0-7566-1692-2.
- Palika, Liz (2007). The Howell Book of Dogs: The Definitive Reference to 300 Breeds and Varieties. Howell Book House. ISBN 978-0-470-00921-5.
- Smith, Steve (2002). The Encyclopedia of North American Sporting Dogs: Written by Sportsmen for Sportsmen. Willow Creek Press. ISBN 978-1-57223-501-4.
