= Blue Picardy Spaniel =

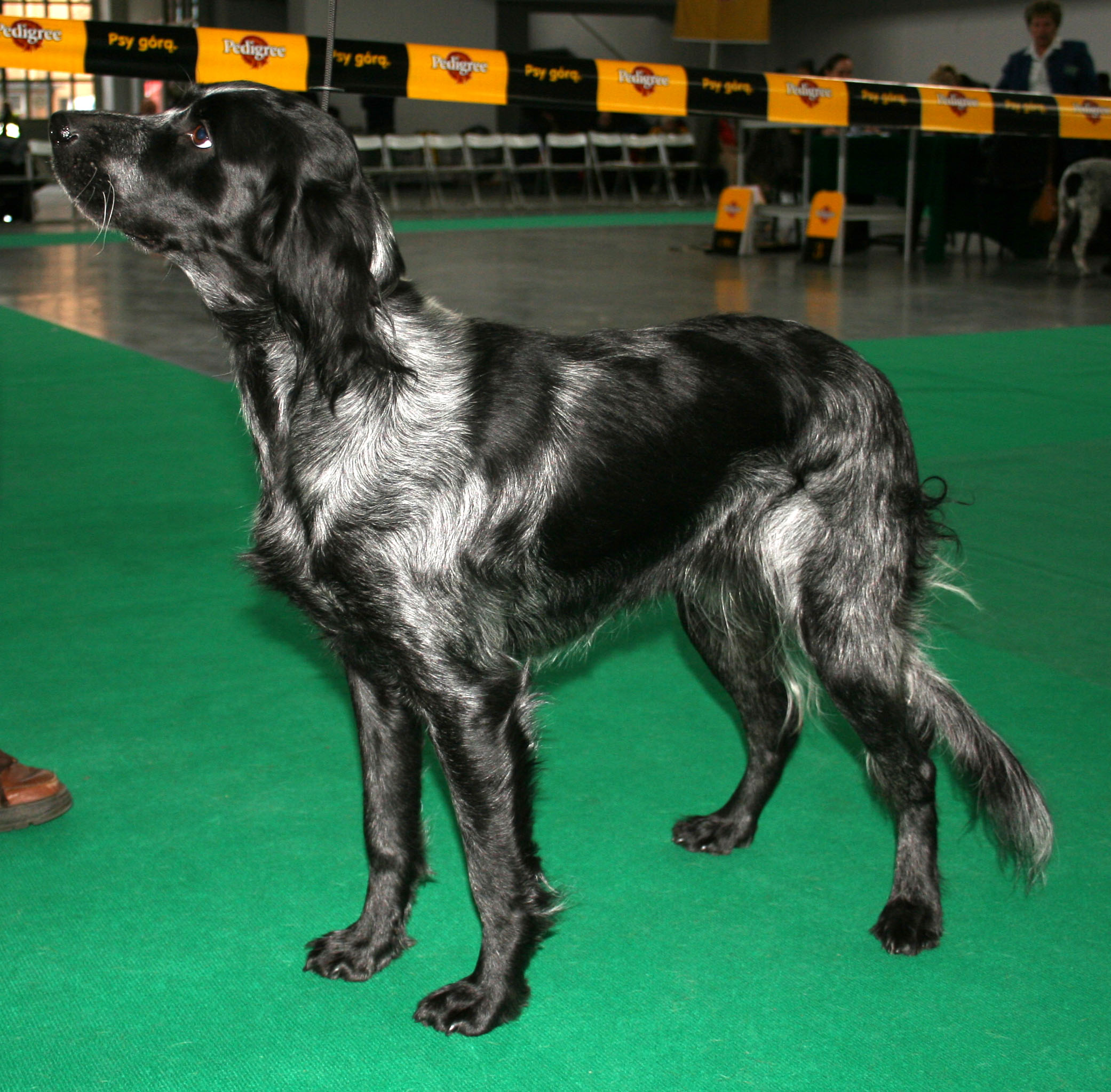
- A Blue Picardy Spaniel
- Other names: Épagneul Bleu de Picardie
- Common nicknames: Bleu Picard
- Origin: France
Kennel club standards
- Société Centrale Canine: standard
- Fédération Cynologique Internationale: standard

The Blue Picardy Spaniel (or Épagneul Bleu de Picardie) is a breed of Spaniel originating in France, from the area around the mouth of the River Somme, around the start of the 20th century. It is descended from Picardy Spaniels and English Setters, and is described as a quiet breed that requires much exercise due to its stamina. It is especially good with children. Similar to the Picardy Spaniel, it has a distinctive coloured coat. The breed is recognized by the Fédération Cynologique Internationale, the Canadian Kennel Club, the Société Centrale Canine, and the United Kennel Club. It is not yet recognized by the American Kennel Club though registration services are provided though the AKC's Foundation Stock Service. The Blue Picardy Spaniel can be found in its greatest numbers in France and Canada.

== Description ==
=== Appearance ===
A Blue Picardy Spaniel on average is around 22–24 inches (56–61 cm) high at the withers and weighs 43–45 pounds (20–20 kg). Its coat is speckled grey black forming a bluish shade, with some black patches. The coat is flat or a little wavy with feathering on the ears, legs, underside and tail. It has strong muscled legs.

It has a long broad muzzle, with thick ears covered in silky hair that usually end around the tip of the muzzle. Its chest is of medium size that descends down to the same level as the elbows. Both the forequarters and the hindquarters are well muscled. Its tail typically does not extend beyond the hock and is normally straight.

The breed shares many traits with the Picardy Spaniel, their breed standards being quite similar. The Blue Picardy Spaniel is described as being softer, as well as the obvious difference in coat color. The Picardy has a brown coat, whereas the Blue Picardy has a black and grey coat, which was brought into the breed by the introduction of English Setter blood.

=== Temperament ===
The Blue Picardy is considered to be a quiet breed, but it requires a great deal of exercise, as it has a high level of stamina. It loves to play and is a responsive and obedient breed which thrives on human companionship. It is especially good with children.

== History ==
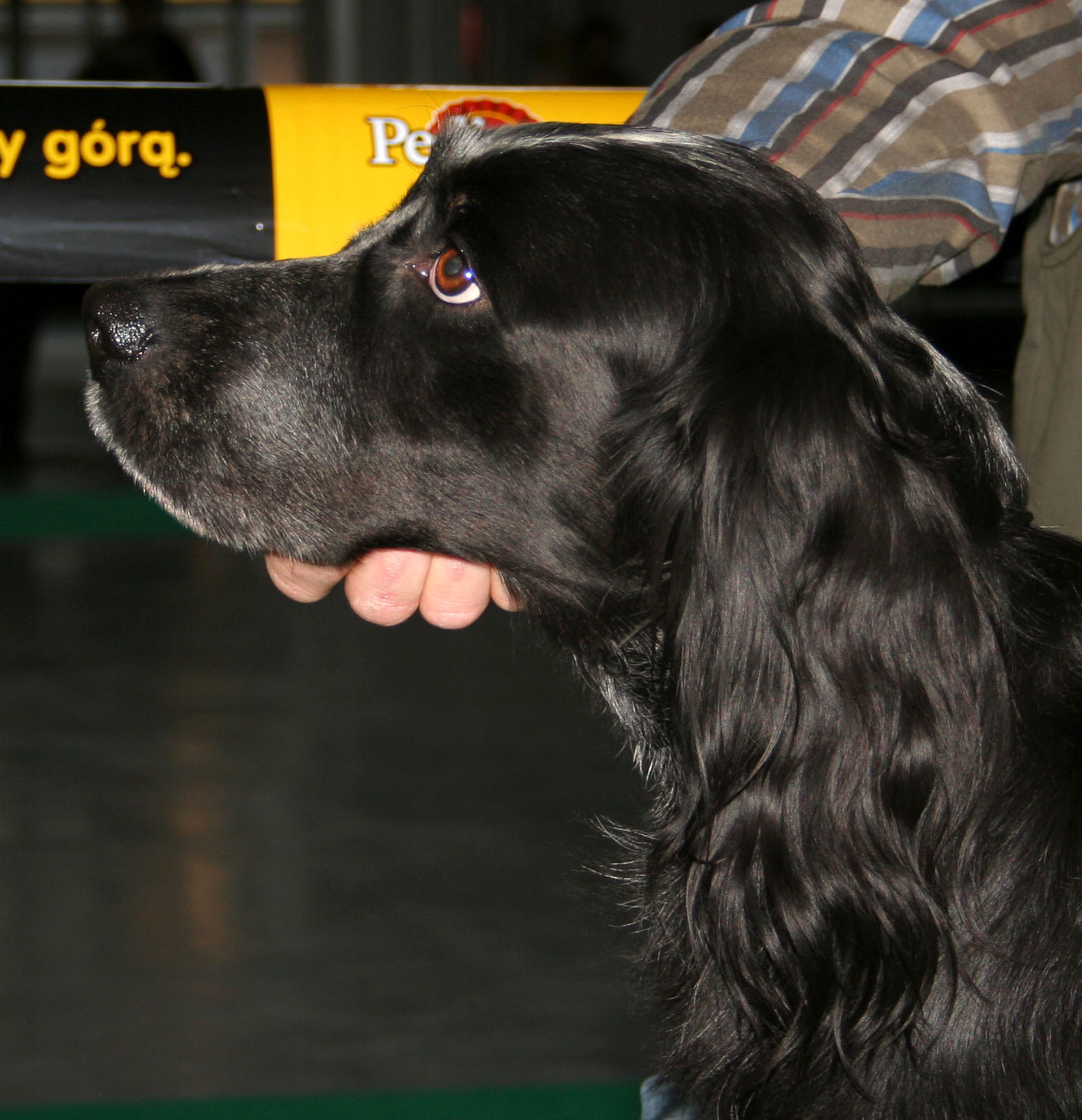
A close-up of the facial features of a Blue Picardy Spaniel.

At the turn of the 20th century the area around the mouth of the River Somme was considered a paradise for hunters interested in wildfowl. Because of quarantine restrictions in the United Kingdom, British shooters would board their dogs in the Picardy area, near the mouth of the Somme. This caused the infusion of English Setter blood into the local Spaniel population which led to the development of the Blue Picardy Spaniel.

While the first black, blue-grey Spaniel was recorded in 1875, it was not until 1904 when the Picardy Spaniel was first shown. This Spaniel was officially classified as a French Spaniel, and was shown at the Paris Canine Exposition. When the Picardy Spaniel and Blue Picardy Spaniel Club was formed in 1907, the two different breeds of Picardy Spaniel were categorised.

In France, the Blue Picardy was recognised as a separate breed in 1938. The first person to import the Blue Picardy Spaniel into Canada was Ronald Meunier of Saint-Julien, Quebec, around 1987, and the breed was then recognised by the Canadian Kennel Club effective 1 June 1995.
