= American Rare Breed Association =

Kennel club for dog breeds not recognized by the American Kennel Club

- Abbreviation: ARBA
- Type: Kennel Club
- Purpose: Rare dog breeds not recognized by the American Kennel Club
- Region served: United States
- Official language: English
- Website: www.arba.org

The American Rare Breed Association (ARBA) is a kennel club for owners and fanciers of dog breeds and types not recognized by the American Kennel Club.
