= Water spaniel =

Water spaniel (capitalized in the names of standardized breeds) was originally a term for water dogs generally, and today refer to several different breeds of water dogs that actually are spaniels, such as:

- American Water Spaniel
- English Water Spaniel, extinct
- Irish Water Spaniel
- Tweed Water Spaniel, extinct
