= The Intelligence of Dogs =

Book by Stanley Coren

The Intelligence of Dogs: A Guide to the Thoughts, Emotions, and Inner Lives of Our Canine Companions
- Author: Stanley Coren
- Language: English
- Genre: Science & Nature
- Publisher: Free Press
- Publication date: 10 May 1994
- Publication place: United States
- Media type: Print (hardback and paperback)
- Pages: 336

The Intelligence of Dogs: A Guide to the Thoughts, Emotions, and Inner Lives of Our Canine Companions is a 1994 book on dog intelligence by Stanley Coren, a professor of canine psychology at the University of British Columbia. The book explains Coren's theories about the differences in intelligence between various breeds of dogs. Coren published a second edition in 2006.

Coren defines three aspects of dog intelligence in the book: instinctive intelligence, adaptive intelligence, and working and obedience intelligence. Instinctive intelligence refers to a dog's ability to perform the tasks it was bred for, such as herding, pointing, fetching, guarding, or supplying companionship. Adaptive intelligence refers to a dog's ability to solve problems on its own. Working and obedience intelligence refers to a dog's ability to learn from humans.

== Methods ==
The book's ranking focuses on working and obedience intelligence. Coren sent evaluation requests to American Kennel Club and Canadian Kennel Club obedience trial judges, asking them to rank breeds by performance, and received 199 responses, representing about 50 percent of obedience judges then working in North America. Assessments were limited to breeds receiving at least 100 judge responses. This methodology aimed to eliminate the excessive weight that might result from a simple tabulation of obedience degrees by breed. Its use of expert opinion followed precedent.

Coren found substantial agreement in the judges' rankings of working and obedience intelligence, with Border Collies consistently named in the top ten and Afghan Hounds consistently named in the lowest. The highest ranked dogs in this category were Border Collies, Poodles, German Shepherds, Golden Retrievers, and Doberman Pinschers.

Dogs that are not breeds recognized by the American Kennel Club or Canadian Kennel Club (such as the Jack Russell Terrier) were not included in Coren's rankings.

== Evaluation ==
Coren's book presents a ranked list of breed intelligence, based on a survey of 208 dog obedience judges across North America. When it was first published there was much media attention and commentary in terms of both pros and cons. Over the years, Coren's ranking of breeds and methodology have come to be accepted as a valid description of the differences among dog breeds in terms of their trainability. A 2009 measurement of canine intelligence using another method confirmed the general pattern of these rankings, and Coren included an updated study using owner ratings of dog trainability and intelligence in the 2006 edition of the book.

The value of survey-based cognition findings have been dismissed by some cognitive researchers and dog trainers.

The 1995 edition of Coren's book lists 130 dog breeds, and assigns them to 79 ranks with some ties, grouped into six descending categories.

Rank	Breed	Category
1	Border Collie	Brightest Dogs: Understanding of new commands: fewer than 5 repetitions.; Obey first command: 95% of the time or better.
2	Poodle	Brightest Dogs: Understanding of new commands: fewer than 5 repetitions.; Obey first command: 95% of the time or better.
3	German Shepherd	Brightest Dogs: Understanding of new commands: fewer than 5 repetitions.; Obey first command: 95% of the time or better.
4	Golden Retriever	Brightest Dogs: Understanding of new commands: fewer than 5 repetitions.; Obey first command: 95% of the time or better.
5	Doberman Pinscher	Brightest Dogs: Understanding of new commands: fewer than 5 repetitions.; Obey first command: 95% of the time or better.
6	Shetland Sheepdog	Brightest Dogs: Understanding of new commands: fewer than 5 repetitions.; Obey first command: 95% of the time or better.
7	Labrador Retriever	Brightest Dogs: Understanding of new commands: fewer than 5 repetitions.; Obey first command: 95% of the time or better.
8	Papillon	Brightest Dogs: Understanding of new commands: fewer than 5 repetitions.; Obey first command: 95% of the time or better.
9	Rottweiler	Brightest Dogs: Understanding of new commands: fewer than 5 repetitions.; Obey first command: 95% of the time or better.
10	Australian Cattle Dog	Brightest Dogs: Understanding of new commands: fewer than 5 repetitions.; Obey first command: 95% of the time or better.
11	Pembroke Welsh Corgi	Excellent Working Dogs: Understanding of new commands: 5 to 15 repetitions.; Obey first command: 85% of the time or better.
12	Miniature Schnauzer	Excellent Working Dogs: Understanding of new commands: 5 to 15 repetitions.; Obey first command: 85% of the time or better.
13	English Springer Spaniel	Excellent Working Dogs: Understanding of new commands: 5 to 15 repetitions.; Obey first command: 85% of the time or better.
14	Belgian Shepherd Dog (Tervuren)	Excellent Working Dogs: Understanding of new commands: 5 to 15 repetitions.; Obey first command: 85% of the time or better.
15	Schipperke	Excellent Working Dogs: Understanding of new commands: 5 to 15 repetitions.; Obey first command: 85% of the time or better.
15	Belgian Sheepdog	Excellent Working Dogs: Understanding of new commands: 5 to 15 repetitions.; Obey first command: 85% of the time or better.
16	Collie	Excellent Working Dogs: Understanding of new commands: 5 to 15 repetitions.; Obey first command: 85% of the time or better.
16	Keeshond	Excellent Working Dogs: Understanding of new commands: 5 to 15 repetitions.; Obey first command: 85% of the time or better.
17	German Shorthaired Pointer	Excellent Working Dogs: Understanding of new commands: 5 to 15 repetitions.; Obey first command: 85% of the time or better.
18	Flat-Coated Retriever	Excellent Working Dogs: Understanding of new commands: 5 to 15 repetitions.; Obey first command: 85% of the time or better.
18	English Cocker Spaniel	Excellent Working Dogs: Understanding of new commands: 5 to 15 repetitions.; Obey first command: 85% of the time or better.
18	Standard Schnauzer	Excellent Working Dogs: Understanding of new commands: 5 to 15 repetitions.; Obey first command: 85% of the time or better.
19	Brittany	Excellent Working Dogs: Understanding of new commands: 5 to 15 repetitions.; Obey first command: 85% of the time or better.
20	Cocker Spaniel	Excellent Working Dogs: Understanding of new commands: 5 to 15 repetitions.; Obey first command: 85% of the time or better.
21	Weimaraner	Excellent Working Dogs: Understanding of new commands: 5 to 15 repetitions.; Obey first command: 85% of the time or better.
22	Belgian Malinois	Excellent Working Dogs: Understanding of new commands: 5 to 15 repetitions.; Obey first command: 85% of the time or better.
22	Bernese Mountain Dog	Excellent Working Dogs: Understanding of new commands: 5 to 15 repetitions.; Obey first command: 85% of the time or better.
23	Pomeranian	Excellent Working Dogs: Understanding of new commands: 5 to 15 repetitions.; Obey first command: 85% of the time or better.
24	Irish Water Spaniel	Excellent Working Dogs: Understanding of new commands: 5 to 15 repetitions.; Obey first command: 85% of the time or better.
25	Vizsla	Excellent Working Dogs: Understanding of new commands: 5 to 15 repetitions.; Obey first command: 85% of the time or better.
26	Cardigan Welsh Corgi	Excellent Working Dogs: Understanding of new commands: 5 to 15 repetitions.; Obey first command: 85% of the time or better.
27	Chesapeake Bay Retriever	Above Average Working Dogs: Understanding of new commands: 15 to 25 repetitions.; Obey first command: 70% of the time or better.
27	Puli	Above Average Working Dogs: Understanding of new commands: 15 to 25 repetitions.; Obey first command: 70% of the time or better.
27	Yorkshire Terrier	Above Average Working Dogs: Understanding of new commands: 15 to 25 repetitions.; Obey first command: 70% of the time or better.
28	Giant Schnauzer	Above Average Working Dogs: Understanding of new commands: 15 to 25 repetitions.; Obey first command: 70% of the time or better.
29	Airedale Terrier	Above Average Working Dogs: Understanding of new commands: 15 to 25 repetitions.; Obey first command: 70% of the time or better.
29	Bouvier des Flandres	Above Average Working Dogs: Understanding of new commands: 15 to 25 repetitions.; Obey first command: 70% of the time or better.
30	Border Terrier	Above Average Working Dogs: Understanding of new commands: 15 to 25 repetitions.; Obey first command: 70% of the time or better.
30	Briard	Above Average Working Dogs: Understanding of new commands: 15 to 25 repetitions.; Obey first command: 70% of the time or better.
31	Welsh Springer Spaniel	Above Average Working Dogs: Understanding of new commands: 15 to 25 repetitions.; Obey first command: 70% of the time or better.
32	Manchester Terrier	Above Average Working Dogs: Understanding of new commands: 15 to 25 repetitions.; Obey first command: 70% of the time or better.
33	Samoyed	Above Average Working Dogs: Understanding of new commands: 15 to 25 repetitions.; Obey first command: 70% of the time or better.
34	Field Spaniel	Above Average Working Dogs: Understanding of new commands: 15 to 25 repetitions.; Obey first command: 70% of the time or better.
34	Newfoundland	Above Average Working Dogs: Understanding of new commands: 15 to 25 repetitions.; Obey first command: 70% of the time or better.
34	Australian Terrier	Above Average Working Dogs: Understanding of new commands: 15 to 25 repetitions.; Obey first command: 70% of the time or better.
34	American Staffordshire Terrier	Above Average Working Dogs: Understanding of new commands: 15 to 25 repetitions.; Obey first command: 70% of the time or better.
34	Gordon Setter	Above Average Working Dogs: Understanding of new commands: 15 to 25 repetitions.; Obey first command: 70% of the time or better.
34	Bearded Collie	Above Average Working Dogs: Understanding of new commands: 15 to 25 repetitions.; Obey first command: 70% of the time or better.
35	Cairn Terrier	Above Average Working Dogs: Understanding of new commands: 15 to 25 repetitions.; Obey first command: 70% of the time or better.
35	Kerry Blue Terrier	Above Average Working Dogs: Understanding of new commands: 15 to 25 repetitions.; Obey first command: 70% of the time or better.
35	Irish Setter	Above Average Working Dogs: Understanding of new commands: 15 to 25 repetitions.; Obey first command: 70% of the time or better.
36	Norwegian Elkhound	Above Average Working Dogs: Understanding of new commands: 15 to 25 repetitions.; Obey first command: 70% of the time or better.
37	Affenpinscher	Above Average Working Dogs: Understanding of new commands: 15 to 25 repetitions.; Obey first command: 70% of the time or better.
37	Australian Silky Terrier	Above Average Working Dogs: Understanding of new commands: 15 to 25 repetitions.; Obey first command: 70% of the time or better.
37	Miniature Pinscher	Above Average Working Dogs: Understanding of new commands: 15 to 25 repetitions.; Obey first command: 70% of the time or better.
37	English Setter	Above Average Working Dogs: Understanding of new commands: 15 to 25 repetitions.; Obey first command: 70% of the time or better.
37	Pharaoh Hound	Above Average Working Dogs: Understanding of new commands: 15 to 25 repetitions.; Obey first command: 70% of the time or better.
37	Clumber Spaniel	Above Average Working Dogs: Understanding of new commands: 15 to 25 repetitions.; Obey first command: 70% of the time or better.
38	Norwich Terrier	Above Average Working Dogs: Understanding of new commands: 15 to 25 repetitions.; Obey first command: 70% of the time or better.
39	Dalmatian	Above Average Working Dogs: Understanding of new commands: 15 to 25 repetitions.; Obey first command: 70% of the time or better.
40	Soft-coated Wheaten Terrier	Average Working/Obedience Intelligence: Understanding of new commands: 25 to 40 repetitions.; Obey first command: 50% of the time or better.
40	Bedlington Terrier	Average Working/Obedience Intelligence: Understanding of new commands: 25 to 40 repetitions.; Obey first command: 50% of the time or better.
40	Smooth Fox Terrier	Average Working/Obedience Intelligence: Understanding of new commands: 25 to 40 repetitions.; Obey first command: 50% of the time or better.
41	Curly Coated Retriever	Average Working/Obedience Intelligence: Understanding of new commands: 25 to 40 repetitions.; Obey first command: 50% of the time or better.
41	Irish Wolfhound	Average Working/Obedience Intelligence: Understanding of new commands: 25 to 40 repetitions.; Obey first command: 50% of the time or better.
42	Kuvasz	Average Working/Obedience Intelligence: Understanding of new commands: 25 to 40 repetitions.; Obey first command: 50% of the time or better.
42	Australian Shepherd	Average Working/Obedience Intelligence: Understanding of new commands: 25 to 40 repetitions.; Obey first command: 50% of the time or better.
43	Saluki	Average Working/Obedience Intelligence: Understanding of new commands: 25 to 40 repetitions.; Obey first command: 50% of the time or better.
43	Finnish Spitz	Average Working/Obedience Intelligence: Understanding of new commands: 25 to 40 repetitions.; Obey first command: 50% of the time or better.
43	Pointer	Average Working/Obedience Intelligence: Understanding of new commands: 25 to 40 repetitions.; Obey first command: 50% of the time or better.
44	Cavalier King Charles Spaniel	Average Working/Obedience Intelligence: Understanding of new commands: 25 to 40 repetitions.; Obey first command: 50% of the time or better.
44	German Wirehaired Pointer	Average Working/Obedience Intelligence: Understanding of new commands: 25 to 40 repetitions.; Obey first command: 50% of the time or better.
44	Black and Tan Coonhound	Average Working/Obedience Intelligence: Understanding of new commands: 25 to 40 repetitions.; Obey first command: 50% of the time or better.
44	American Water Spaniel	Average Working/Obedience Intelligence: Understanding of new commands: 25 to 40 repetitions.; Obey first command: 50% of the time or better.
45	Siberian Husky	Average Working/Obedience Intelligence: Understanding of new commands: 25 to 40 repetitions.; Obey first command: 50% of the time or better.
45	Bichon Frise	Average Working/Obedience Intelligence: Understanding of new commands: 25 to 40 repetitions.; Obey first command: 50% of the time or better.
45	King Charles Spaniel	Average Working/Obedience Intelligence: Understanding of new commands: 25 to 40 repetitions.; Obey first command: 50% of the time or better.
46	Tibetan Spaniel	Average Working/Obedience Intelligence: Understanding of new commands: 25 to 40 repetitions.; Obey first command: 50% of the time or better.
46	English Foxhound	Average Working/Obedience Intelligence: Understanding of new commands: 25 to 40 repetitions.; Obey first command: 50% of the time or better.
46	Otterhound	Average Working/Obedience Intelligence: Understanding of new commands: 25 to 40 repetitions.; Obey first command: 50% of the time or better.
46	Jack Russell Terrier	Average Working/Obedience Intelligence: Understanding of new commands: 25 to 40 repetitions.; Obey first command: 50% of the time or better.
46	American Foxhound	Average Working/Obedience Intelligence: Understanding of new commands: 25 to 40 repetitions.; Obey first command: 50% of the time or better.
46	Greyhound	Average Working/Obedience Intelligence: Understanding of new commands: 25 to 40 repetitions.; Obey first command: 50% of the time or better.
46	Wirehaired Pointing Griffon	Average Working/Obedience Intelligence: Understanding of new commands: 25 to 40 repetitions.; Obey first command: 50% of the time or better.
47	West Highland White Terrier	Average Working/Obedience Intelligence: Understanding of new commands: 25 to 40 repetitions.; Obey first command: 50% of the time or better.
47	Scottish Deerhound	Average Working/Obedience Intelligence: Understanding of new commands: 25 to 40 repetitions.; Obey first command: 50% of the time or better.
48	Boxer	Average Working/Obedience Intelligence: Understanding of new commands: 25 to 40 repetitions.; Obey first command: 50% of the time or better.
48	Great Dane	Average Working/Obedience Intelligence: Understanding of new commands: 25 to 40 repetitions.; Obey first command: 50% of the time or better.
49	Dachshund	Average Working/Obedience Intelligence: Understanding of new commands: 25 to 40 repetitions.; Obey first command: 50% of the time or better.
49	Staffordshire Bull Terrier	Average Working/Obedience Intelligence: Understanding of new commands: 25 to 40 repetitions.; Obey first command: 50% of the time or better.
50	Alaskan Malamute	Average Working/Obedience Intelligence: Understanding of new commands: 25 to 40 repetitions.; Obey first command: 50% of the time or better.
51	Whippet	Average Working/Obedience Intelligence: Understanding of new commands: 25 to 40 repetitions.; Obey first command: 50% of the time or better.
51	Shar Pei	Average Working/Obedience Intelligence: Understanding of new commands: 25 to 40 repetitions.; Obey first command: 50% of the time or better.
51	Wire Fox Terrier	Average Working/Obedience Intelligence: Understanding of new commands: 25 to 40 repetitions.; Obey first command: 50% of the time or better.
52	Rhodesian Ridgeback	Average Working/Obedience Intelligence: Understanding of new commands: 25 to 40 repetitions.; Obey first command: 50% of the time or better.
53	Ibizan Hound	Average Working/Obedience Intelligence: Understanding of new commands: 25 to 40 repetitions.; Obey first command: 50% of the time or better.
53	Welsh Terrier	Average Working/Obedience Intelligence: Understanding of new commands: 25 to 40 repetitions.; Obey first command: 50% of the time or better.
53	Irish Terrier	Average Working/Obedience Intelligence: Understanding of new commands: 25 to 40 repetitions.; Obey first command: 50% of the time or better.
54	Boston Terrier	Average Working/Obedience Intelligence: Understanding of new commands: 25 to 40 repetitions.; Obey first command: 50% of the time or better.
54	Akita	Average Working/Obedience Intelligence: Understanding of new commands: 25 to 40 repetitions.; Obey first command: 50% of the time or better.
55	Skye Terrier	Fair Working/Obedience Intelligence: Understanding of new commands: 40 to 80 repetitions.; Obey first command: 30% of the time or better.
56	Norfolk Terrier	Fair Working/Obedience Intelligence: Understanding of new commands: 40 to 80 repetitions.; Obey first command: 30% of the time or better.
56	Sealyham Terrier	Fair Working/Obedience Intelligence: Understanding of new commands: 40 to 80 repetitions.; Obey first command: 30% of the time or better.
57	Pug	Fair Working/Obedience Intelligence: Understanding of new commands: 40 to 80 repetitions.; Obey first command: 30% of the time or better.
58	French Bulldog	Fair Working/Obedience Intelligence: Understanding of new commands: 40 to 80 repetitions.; Obey first command: 30% of the time or better.
59	Griffon Bruxellois	Fair Working/Obedience Intelligence: Understanding of new commands: 40 to 80 repetitions.; Obey first command: 30% of the time or better.
59	Maltese	Fair Working/Obedience Intelligence: Understanding of new commands: 40 to 80 repetitions.; Obey first command: 30% of the time or better.
60	Italian Greyhound	Fair Working/Obedience Intelligence: Understanding of new commands: 40 to 80 repetitions.; Obey first command: 30% of the time or better.
61	Chinese Crested Dog	Fair Working/Obedience Intelligence: Understanding of new commands: 40 to 80 repetitions.; Obey first command: 30% of the time or better.
62	Dandie Dinmont Terrier	Fair Working/Obedience Intelligence: Understanding of new commands: 40 to 80 repetitions.; Obey first command: 30% of the time or better.
62	Petit Basset Griffon Vendéen	Fair Working/Obedience Intelligence: Understanding of new commands: 40 to 80 repetitions.; Obey first command: 30% of the time or better.
62	Tibetan Terrier	Fair Working/Obedience Intelligence: Understanding of new commands: 40 to 80 repetitions.; Obey first command: 30% of the time or better.
62	Japanese Chin	Fair Working/Obedience Intelligence: Understanding of new commands: 40 to 80 repetitions.; Obey first command: 30% of the time or better.
62	Lakeland Terrier	Fair Working/Obedience Intelligence: Understanding of new commands: 40 to 80 repetitions.; Obey first command: 30% of the time or better.
63	Old English Sheepdog	Fair Working/Obedience Intelligence: Understanding of new commands: 40 to 80 repetitions.; Obey first command: 30% of the time or better.
64	Great Pyrenees	Fair Working/Obedience Intelligence: Understanding of new commands: 40 to 80 repetitions.; Obey first command: 30% of the time or better.
65	Scottish Terrier	Fair Working/Obedience Intelligence: Understanding of new commands: 40 to 80 repetitions.; Obey first command: 30% of the time or better.
65	Saint Bernard	Fair Working/Obedience Intelligence: Understanding of new commands: 40 to 80 repetitions.; Obey first command: 30% of the time or better.
66	Bull Terrier	Fair Working/Obedience Intelligence: Understanding of new commands: 40 to 80 repetitions.; Obey first command: 30% of the time or better.
67	Chihuahua	Fair Working/Obedience Intelligence: Understanding of new commands: 40 to 80 repetitions.; Obey first command: 30% of the time or better.
68	Lhasa Apso	Fair Working/Obedience Intelligence: Understanding of new commands: 40 to 80 repetitions.; Obey first command: 30% of the time or better.
69	Bullmastiff	Fair Working/Obedience Intelligence: Understanding of new commands: 40 to 80 repetitions.; Obey first command: 30% of the time or better.
70	Shih Tzu	Lowest Degree of Working/Obedience Intelligence: Understanding of new commands: 80 to 100 repetitions or more.; Obey first command: 25% of the time or worse.
71	Basset Hound	Lowest Degree of Working/Obedience Intelligence: Understanding of new commands: 80 to 100 repetitions or more.; Obey first command: 25% of the time or worse.
72	Mastiff	Lowest Degree of Working/Obedience Intelligence: Understanding of new commands: 80 to 100 repetitions or more.; Obey first command: 25% of the time or worse.
72	Beagle	Lowest Degree of Working/Obedience Intelligence: Understanding of new commands: 80 to 100 repetitions or more.; Obey first command: 25% of the time or worse.
73	Pekingese	Lowest Degree of Working/Obedience Intelligence: Understanding of new commands: 80 to 100 repetitions or more.; Obey first command: 25% of the time or worse.
74	Bloodhound	Lowest Degree of Working/Obedience Intelligence: Understanding of new commands: 80 to 100 repetitions or more.; Obey first command: 25% of the time or worse.
75	Borzoi	Lowest Degree of Working/Obedience Intelligence: Understanding of new commands: 80 to 100 repetitions or more.; Obey first command: 25% of the time or worse.
76	Chow Chow	Lowest Degree of Working/Obedience Intelligence: Understanding of new commands: 80 to 100 repetitions or more.; Obey first command: 25% of the time or worse.
77	Bulldog	Lowest Degree of Working/Obedience Intelligence: Understanding of new commands: 80 to 100 repetitions or more.; Obey first command: 25% of the time or worse.
78	Basenji	Lowest Degree of Working/Obedience Intelligence: Understanding of new commands: 80 to 100 repetitions or more.; Obey first command: 25% of the time or worse.
79	Afghan Hound	Lowest Degree of Working/Obedience Intelligence: Understanding of new commands: 80 to 100 repetitions or more.; Obey first command: 25% of the time or worse.

== See also ==
- List of dog breeds
- List of individual dogs
