= Boykin Spaniel =

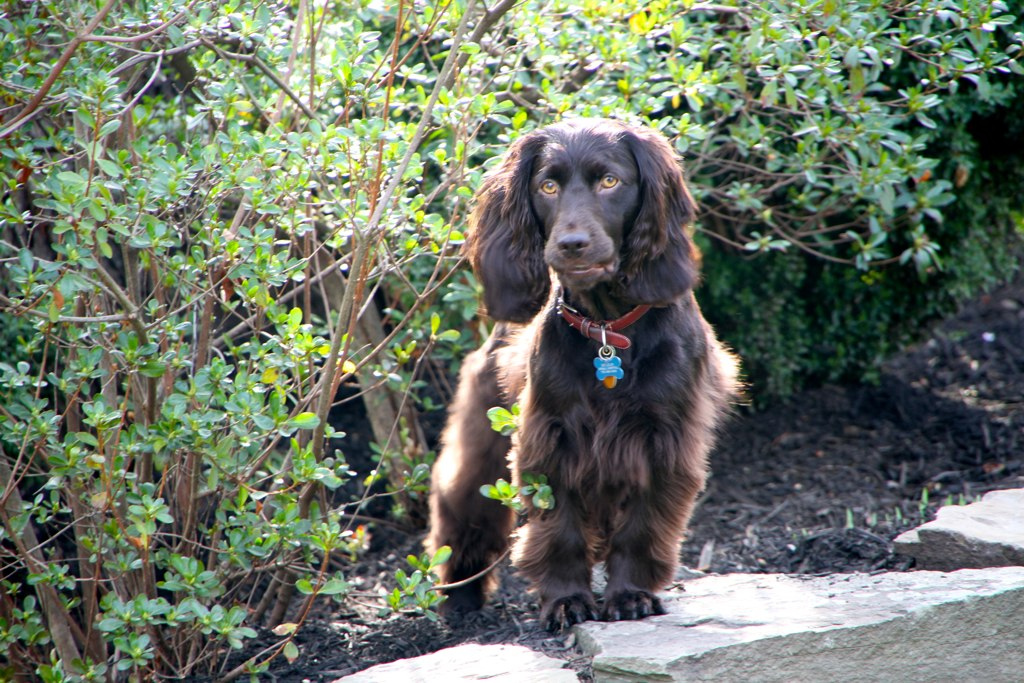
- Boykin Spaniel
- Common nicknames: Boykin, Swamp Poodle, LBD (Little Brown Dog, Little Brown Devil)
- Origin: United States
Traits
Height	Males	15.5–18 in (39–46 cm)
	Females	14–16.5 in (36–42 cm)
Weight	Males	30–40 lb (14–18 kg)
	Females	25–35 lb (11–16 kg)
- Coat: Medium length, straight to moderately curly.
- Color: Rich liver, brown, or dark chocolate.
- Litter size: about 5-8 puppies
Kennel club standards
- United Kennel Club: standard
- Notes: State dog of South Carolina

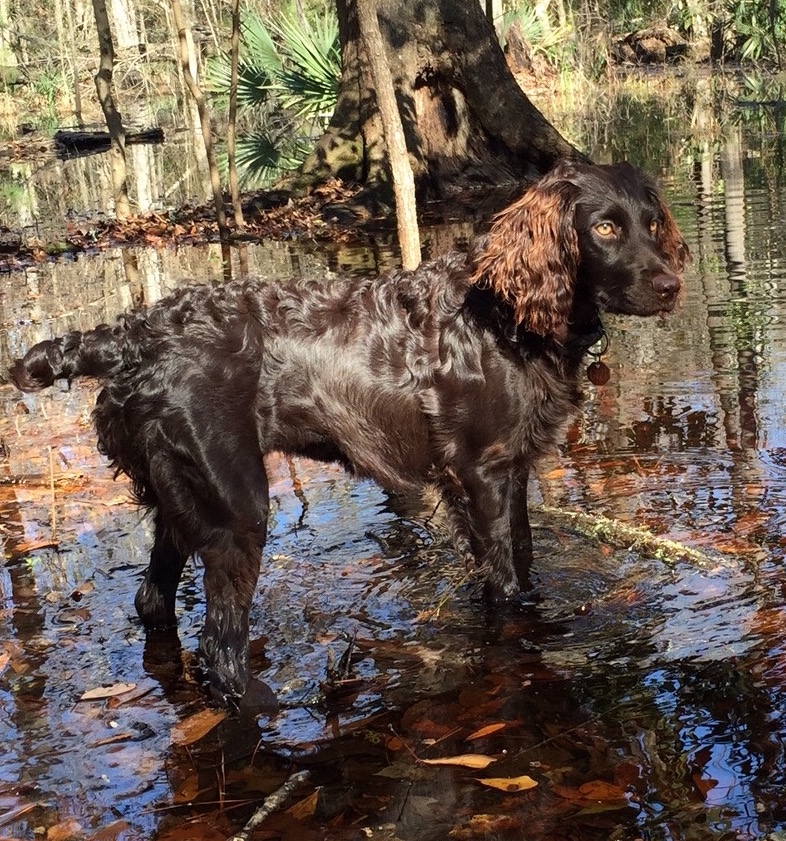
Boykin Spaniel flushing.

The Boykin Spaniel is a medium-sized breed of dog, a Spaniel bred for hunting wild turkeys and ducks in the Wateree River Swamp of South Carolina, in the United States. It is the state dog of South Carolina, where it was discovered and further developed by hunters in the early through mid 1900s. September 1 is Boykin Spaniel Day in South Carolina, originally established in 1984.

== Appearance ==
The Boykin Spaniel is only slightly larger than the English Cocker Spaniel but much heavier through the body width. Height at the withers for males ranges from 15.5–17 in (39–43 cm) and weight 30–40 lb (14–18 kg). Females are smaller, 14–16.5 in (36–42 cm) and 25–35 lb (11–16 kg). Buyers should be aware of the size and weight in the puppy's pedigree before choosing a breeder if size is a factor in their choice of dog. Traditionally, its tail is docked at the age of three days, leaving 1/3 length. Eyes are engaging and bright. The color ranges from brilliant gold to a dark amber. Puppies will have milky bluish-gold to amber eyes until a few months old. The coat color comes in liver or chocolate (shades of brown).

Coat length and density vary widely due to the variety of breeds that make up the recent background of this breed. The coat is flat to moderately curly with medium length, fine hair with light feathering acceptable on the legs, feet, ears, chest, and belly. Length is normally 1-2 inches throughout the body. A few bloodlines throw shorter, straight coats much like a Labrador Retriever. Feathering on the ears, chest, through the tuck-up and along the legs can be very little to moderate in density and length. Feathering may take on a sun-bleached golden to tawny color especially on the ears and should not be penalized. Groomed dogs should have a minimal of stripping or clipping, with slight shaping around the head and topline. Some individuals have a topknot like a Llewellin Setter. Field types are often shaved down and should not be penalized as long as it is of appropriate length to protect the skin. Improper shaving will result in some coats growing back in with excessive discoloration, fading or graying. White markings other than a mark on the chest, or a white mark on the chest that is more than 60% of the width of the chest, disqualify puppies from being registered with the Boykin Spaniel Society, although the American Kennel Club and United Kennel Club do not allow denial of registration for conformation reasons. White on the toes or chest is purely a cosmetic trait and will not affect the ability or health of the dog.

== Hunting use ==
The Boykin Spaniel is a versatile hunter, working as a retriever and upland hunter, flushing birds into flight. Pointing is not in character with the Boykin's hunting style, but many confuse the inherent characteristic of a "hesitant flush" with pointing. Of the six or eight different breeds used to create the current breed, three are pointing breeds for this reason. The field Boykin spaniel wants to be 100% precise when it flushes a bird, and as a dutiful partner it knows to wait until the hunter is positioned for the shot. Their stamina in hot weather and eagerness make them good for dove hunts, but also for pheasant and other upland game. They can be used in driving deer or in tracking wounded game. Their small size makes them easy to carry in a canoe or other small boat, and they are described as "the dog that doesn't rock the boat." However, an unacceptably high percentage of Boykin spaniels are not able to internally produce the proteins necessary to keep their muscles working during sustained work in warm temperatures, and can be fatal. As of 2017, Exercise Induced Collapse syndrome appears in about 10% of all Boykin spaniels due to inattentive breeding practices. Screening for the presence of the gene which causes EIC is done by simple DNA sample collection and analysis. Prospective buyers of Boykin spaniel puppies are advised to obtain verified proof of DNA testing from all breeders before buying.

== Care ==
As with all dogs, the Boykin Spaniels require daily exercise and regular grooming. Clipping the coat regularly is recommended especially if the dog is in the field, as the soft coat collects foxtails and briars.

== History ==
The first Boykin Spaniel, or the precursor of today's breed, was reportedly a small, stray spaniel type dog that befriended a banker walking from his home to the First Presbyterian Church in Spartanburg, South Carolina around 1900. Alexander L. White (1860–1942) liked the little dog and took it home. After the dog showed some aptitude for retrieving, White sent the dog called "Dumpy" to his longtime friend and hunting partner Lemuel Whitaker Boykin near Camden, South Carolina. "Whit" Boykin (1861–1932) experimented with crossbreeding different breeds, and the resulting dog is named after him. This breed is only one of two US-made breeds named for the family responsible for their creation. In Boykin's hands the little stray developed into a superb turkey dog and waterfowl retriever. This dog became the foundation stock for the Boykin spaniel. The dogs had to be small enough to ride in the small boats used by hunters in the swamps. The Chesapeake Bay Retriever, Springer Spaniel, Cocker Spaniel, American Water Spaniel, and various pointing breeds were used in the development of the breed, according to Whit Boykin's grandson Dr. Baynard Boykin. The area in which the breed developed, around Camden, South Carolina, was a resort and hunting area, and the breed was noticed by visitors and so spread around the United States. In 1977 the Boykin Spaniel Society was formed by the Boykin family and began maintaining a studbook in 1979. The BSS studbook has been "closed" since 1980, meaning that only dogs from BSS registered parents may be registered with the BSS. The Boykin Spaniel was recognized by the United Kennel Club in 1985. UKC has an open studbook. In the 1990s, a group of fanciers formed the Boykin Spaniel Club and Breeders Association of America in order to achieve AKC recognition of the breed and to gain access to the AKC Spaniel Hunt Tests held throughout the nation. In 2007 the Boykin Spaniel Club and Breeders Association of America (BSCBAA) was recognized by the AKC as the parent club for the breed.

In January 2006 the breed became eligible to compete in AKC Spaniel Hunt tests for official AKC titles. In July 2006 the Boykin Spaniel was eligible to earn AKC titles in AKC agility, tracking, rally obedience, and regular obedience.

== Health ==
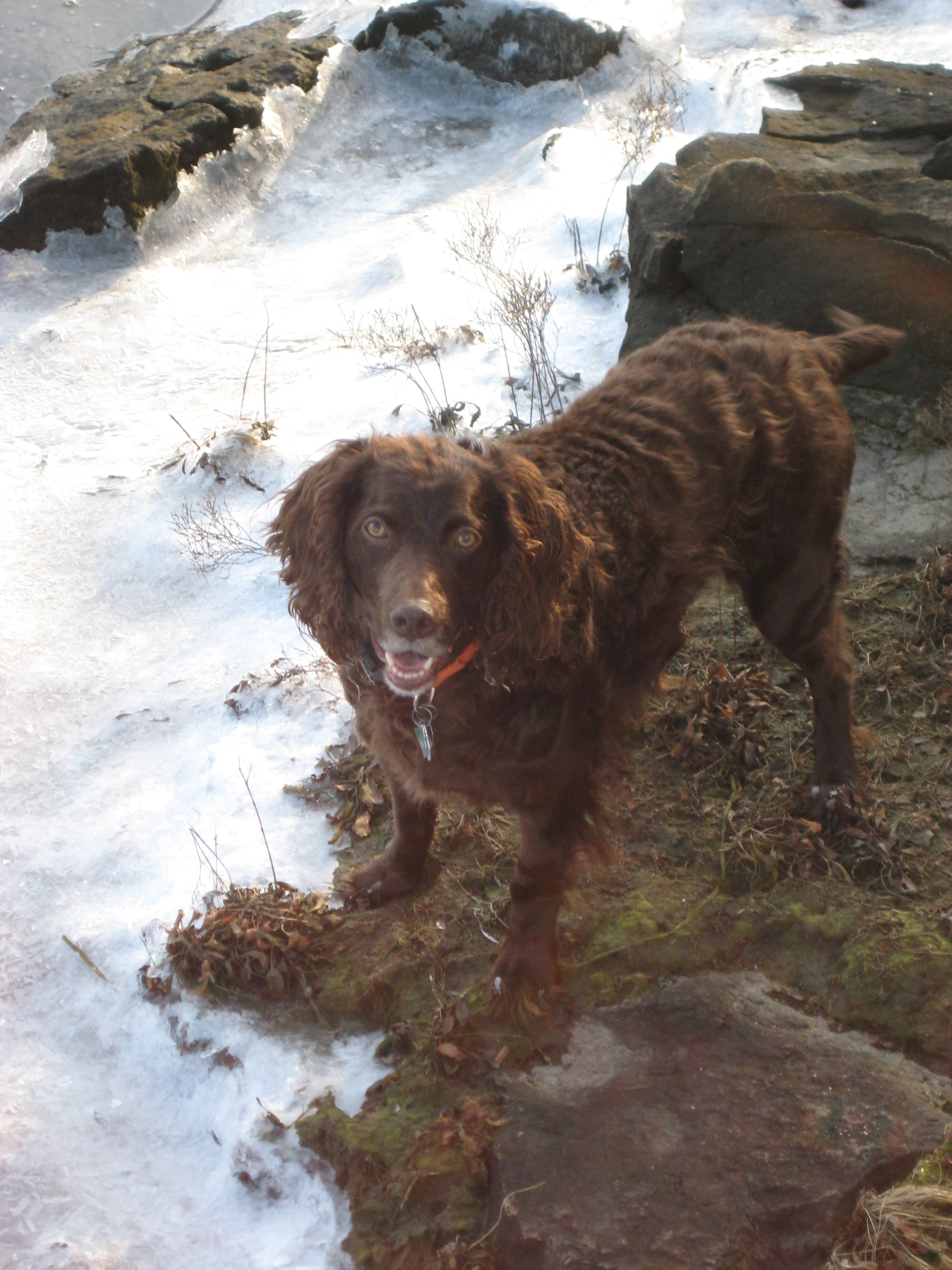
A Boykin Spaniel is adapted to various weather conditions.

According to statistics developed and maintained by the Orthopedic Foundation for Animals (OFA) as of November 2025, adult Boykin Spaniels have a hip dysplasia prevalence of 14.8% for those born after 2021. The prevalence has been declining steadily since 1990, down from 51.8% in Boykin Spaniels born in 1990 or earlier. Canine hip dysplasia is considered by scientists to be both hereditary and acquired (due to diet, too strenuous exercise, and spay/neuter status.)

The breed also has a susceptibility toward inherited heart disease, eye disease and patellar luxation. Skin and coat problems do exist and may be linked to allergic, thyroid or endocrine disorders. Elbow dysplasia, Cushing's disease and hypothyroidism are known in the breed.

In early 2010, exercise-induced collapse was positively identified in the breed by the University of Minnesota's Veterinary Diagnostics Laboratory. In 2013, the Boykin Spaniel Foundation in conjunction with Cornell University's Optigen laboratory did a random sampling of 180+ adult Boykin spaniels for Collie Eye Anomaly, an inherited disease of the eye which causes malformation of eye components and impaired vision, including partial-to-full blindness. A year later, the Boykin Spaniel Foundation did another 180-dog random sample for degenerative myelopathy, another inheritable disease which causes adult dogs to develop gradual, fatal deterioration of the spinal cord and results in death when the afflicted dogs are middle aged. DNA testing of these three autosomal recessive diseases can absolutely identify genetic carriers (one copy of the gene) and at-risk (two copies of the gene) individuals.

Before being used for breeding, dogs should be tested for hip dysplasia, hereditary eye disease, heart/cardiac abnormalities (specifically pulmonary stenosis), hereditary patellar luxation, hereditary exercise-induced collapse, degenerative myelopathy, and Collie Eye Anomaly. Eye examinations should be done annually.

== See also ==
- List of dog breeds
