= Canigou Cambrai =

English Cocker Spaniel

Ch. Canigou Cambrai
- Canigou Cambrai with the best in show trophy at Crufts.
- Other name: Albert
- Species: Canis lupus familiaris
- Breed: English Cocker Spaniel
- Sex: Male
- Born: 13 September 1992
- Died: June 2008 (Aged 15 years and nine months)
- Occupation: Show dog
- Title: Best In Show at Crufts
- Term: 1996–1997
- Predecessor: Ch. Starchelle Chicago Bear (Irish Setter)
- Successor: Ch. Ozmilion Mystification (Yorkshire Terrier)
- Owner: Tricia Bentley
- Parents: Ch. Cleavehill Pot of Gold (sire); Crankwood Miss Happy (dam)
- Offspring: Ch. Cornbow International; Ch. Quettadene Personality
- Awards: 28 CCs, 20 BOBs, 12 RCCs, three gundog groups, and Best in Show in both Crufts and the West of England Ladies Kennel Association in 1996.

Ch. Canigou Cambrai, also known as Albert (1992–2008), an English Cocker Spaniel, is the most recent of his breed to win Best in Show at Crufts in 1996, the seventh occasion it was awarded to a Cocker Spaniel and the first time for forty six years. For a while he was the most successful black male Cocker Spaniel of all time in the UK, and his descendants continue to be multi-show winning champions around the world.

== Show history ==
In November 1995, Albert won best in show and the dog challenge certificate (CC) at the Championship Show of the Devon and Cornwall Cocker Spaniel Club, beating Sh. Ch. Shenmore Seeing Stars into reserve. He became Cocker Spaniel of the Year for 1995, again beating Shenmore Seeing Starts into second place.

In 1996 he was entered in Crufts once again, where he won best of breed under the eyes of judges Ken McFarlane and Jack Clarke. He went on to win best in show, becoming the first Cocker Spaniel since 1950 to do so, and the only cocker to do so that wasn't bred in the Ware kennel of H.S. Lloyd.

At the centenary championship show in 2002 of The Cocker Spaniel Club UK, he won best veteran in show.

Cambrai was the most successful black male Cocker Spaniel of all time in the UK until 10 April 2004, when Sh. Ch. Charbonnel Warlord overtook his record with a 29th CC and best in show at the Cocker Spaniel Club of Scotland.

=== Offspring ===
Albert sired several show quality dogs, including multiple best in show winner in France and Belgium, Ch. Cornbow International "Ruben", and Ch. Quettadene Personality who was the top winning female in Finland in 2001. Albert's descendants continue to be show champions with Ch. Valotsara Unchain My Heart winning both the Czech Republic Junior title and the Luxembourg adult title, and one of her puppies, Ch. Adam Golden Janyt, was imported into America where he won Winners Male at the English Cocker Club of America National Speciality in April 2008.

Other descendants of Albert include Swedish Champion and runner-up junior at the World Dog Show in Milan in 2000, SwShCh Quettadene Lancelot, Australian champion Manunga Musketeer, and two time Polish champion Rain Or Shine Wrzeciono Czasu.

== See also ==
- List of individual dogs
