= American Water Spaniel =

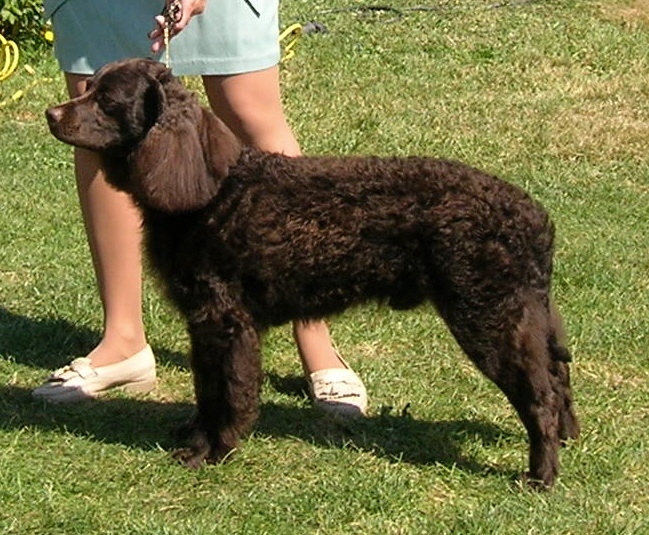
- American Water Spaniel
- Other names: American Brown Spaniel, American Brown Water Spaniel
- Common nicknames: AWS
- Origin: United States
Traits
Height	Males	15–18 inches (38–46 cm)
	Females	15–18 inches (38–46 cm)
Weight	Males	30–45 lb (14–20 kg)
	Females	25–40 lb (11–18 kg)
- Coat: Double coated, curly exterior layer
- Color: Shades of brown
- Litter size: 4-6 pups
Kennel club standards
- American Kennel Club: standard
- Fédération Cynologique Internationale: standard
- Notes: State dog of Wisconsin

The American Water Spaniel (often abbreviated to AWS) is a breed of spaniel which originated in the United States. It was developed in the state of Wisconsin during the 19th century from a number of other breeds, including the Irish and English Water Spaniels. The breed was saved by Dr. Fred J. Pfeifer, who set up the breed club and standard, and whose work led to recognition for the breed by the United Kennel Club, and later, the American Kennel Club. While they are the state dog of Wisconsin, they remain a rare breed.

They are medium-sized dogs, and have a double layered coat, which comes in a variety of brown related shades. A versatile hunting dog, they are also suitable for apartment life due to work by breeders to develop a breed with an even temperament. The AWS may have been involved in the development of the Boykin Spaniel.

== History ==
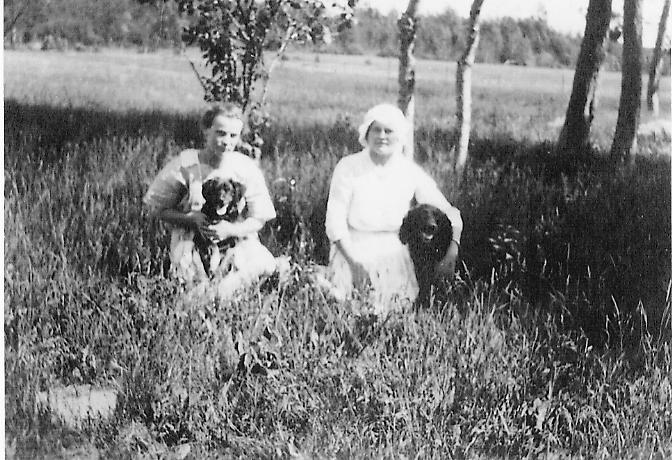
American Water Spaniels, pictured in 1913

Originating in Wisconsin, the American Water Spaniel is the Wisconsin state dog. The breed originated in the areas along the Fox River and its tributary the Wolf River during the early 19th century. Hunters needed a dog that could work on both land and water, a versatile hunter skilled at bringing in a variety of game. Hunters also wanted a hunting dog compact enough to be transported in a small skiff, one that was able to withstand Wisconsin's cold water temperatures. Breeds involved in the creation of the American Water Spaniel are thought to have included the English Water Spaniel, Irish Water Spaniel, Curly Coated Retriever, native Indian Dogs, the Poodle, and either the Sussex Spaniel or another type of field spaniel.

This little brown dog created was known at the time as the American Brown Spaniel, and weighed around 40 pounds (18 kg). It had a thick curly coat that protected it from the cold temperatures of the water and winter. It was used to hunt waterfowl, ruffed grouse, greater prairie chicken and a variety of fur–bearing animals.

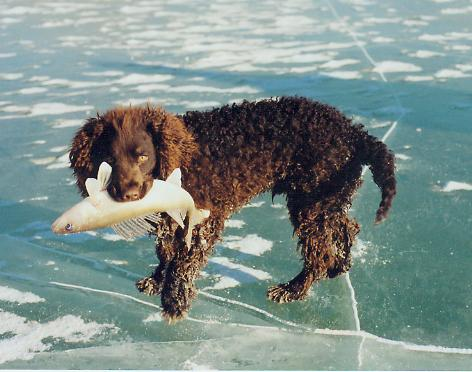
An American Water Spaniel's coat is water resistant

Over the years the numbers of the breed began to dwindle due both to a reduction in the duck population through those valley areas, and because of a switch in hunting – from a means to gather food for survival to that of recreation. Additionally, following World War II, new types of dogs became available in Wisconsin such as setters, pointers and other spaniels, allowing additional specialization in hunting.

Dr. Fred J. Pfeifer, from New London, Wisconsin, set up Wolf River Kennels in order to save the breed. Numbers held by the kennel fluctuated but at times went up to 132 dogs. He advertised the dogs widely across the country, selling male dogs for $25 and females dogs for $20. Part of a sales pitch that Pfeifer mailed to prospective dog owners read, "The American Brown Spaniel is distinctively an American production. Hunters have known this type for years and it was through their efforts that this dog was propagated.... For years we have bred only selective stock, breeding for gameness, stability, courage, intelligence, and beauty. They are dogs to admire and trust under all conditions whether in the home circle or in the field with the outdoor man."

Due to Pfeifer's work, the breed was recognized by the United Kennel Club (UKC) as the American Water Spaniel in 1920, and by the Field Dog Stud Book in 1938. Pfeifer's own dog, named "Curly Pfeifer" was the first American Water Spaniel to be registered with UKC. John Scofield of Missouri and Thomas Brogdan of Rush Lake, Wisconsin worked together with the American Water Spaniel Club (AWSC), gaining the breed recognition with the American Kennel Club (AKC) in 1940. Prior to recognition by the AKC, the breed had not been shown in the show ring.

The breed has links to the Boykin Spaniel, and is thought to have been the main breed used to develop the Boykin. The differences between the Boykin and the AWS are negligible with some dog historians suggesting that the original Boykin, called "Dumpy", who was found on the streets of Spartanburg, South Carolina, was actually an American Water Spaniel who had been misplaced in transit. However the breed clubs for the Boykin do not agree with this account.

The breed was made the state dog of Wisconsin in 1985. The American Water Spaniel remains a rare breed. During 1998 only 233 puppies were registered with the AKC, with an estimated 3,000 dogs in existence mostly around the Midwestern United States, in particular in Wisconsin, Minnesota and Michigan. In 2010, the breed was ranked 143rd most popular breed in the United States, out of 167 breeds. This is a decrease since 2000, when the breed was ranked 125th. The dogs are not classified specifically as either retrievers or as spaniels and so may not compete in AKC field trials, but may compete in AKC hunt tests (spaniel and retriever tests) and retriever hunting tests sponsored by the AWSC, the breed club in the United States. The American Water Spaniel Field Association was set up in 1993 by breed enthusiasts supporting AKC Spaniel classification and looking to provide field training opportunities to owners of the breed. In a vote held of members of the AWSC in 1999, they chose to keep the breed unclassified.

== Appearance ==
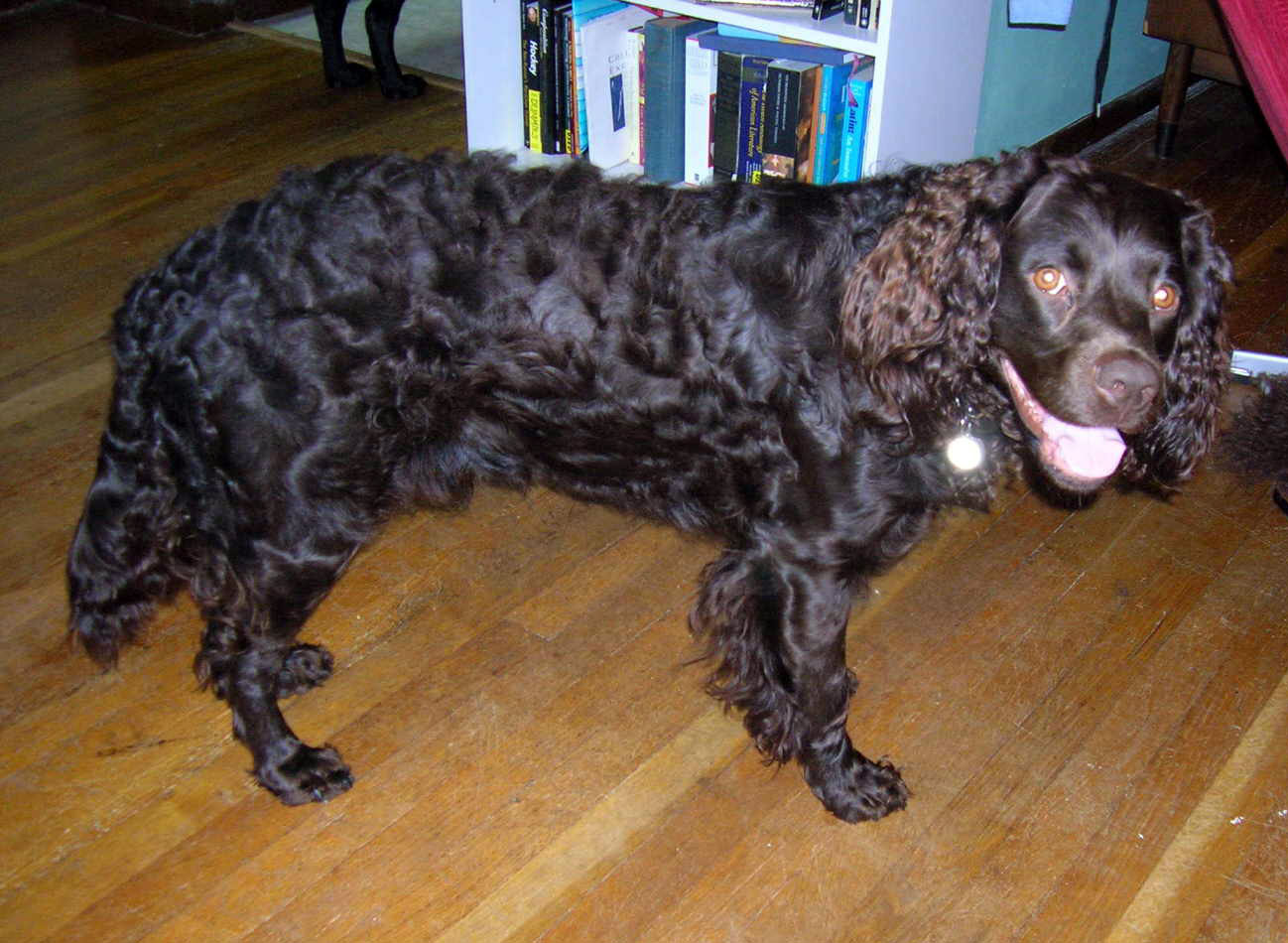
An AWS with a marcel pattern coat

The limited popularity of the American Water Spaniel restricted development, resulting in the breed being relatively unchanged since its origins in the 19th century. They are a medium-sized dog, with a curly liver, brown, or chocolate colored coat. The average height at the withers for the breed is 15–18 inches (38–46 cm), and their weight around 25–45 pounds (11–20 kg). They have similar features to the Irish Water Spaniel, but the Irish breed is larger at between 21–24 inches (53–61 cm) and weighing 55–65 pounds (25–29 kg). The coat of the American Water Spaniel can fall in two different patterns, either tightly curled or in the "marcel pattern" where the fur falls in waves. Working and show lines have not diverged as with some other breeds of spaniel, and both appear the same, with show dogs of this breed being rare.

The coat has a coarse outside layer which keeps water away and protects the dog from foliage such as briers. The inside layer provides insulation to keep the dog warm. The coat has an oily feel to it, which gives off a "doggy smell". The breed standard specifies color of the eyes should harmonize with the color of the coat, and should never be yellow. The skull is broad, and carries long, wide ears. The tail is not typically docked.

== Temperament ==
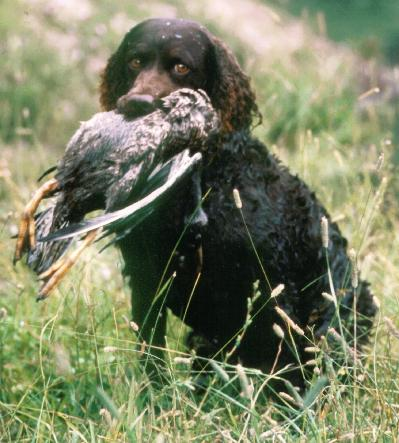
An AWS with a duck

In the field, the AWS is less exuberant than the English Springer Spaniel, but it is as skilled in retrieval as Labrador or Golden Retriever. It is versatile regardless of the type of terrain, and in the water it is not the fastest swimmer but has a high level of endurance. The breed is also good at agility and flyball, with the first of the breed receiving a flyball championship title in 1993.

Members of the breed enjoy being the center of attention, and can be quite vocal at times. It is a one family dog, and will often bond with one particular individual. For many years the breed was "pack bred", where they were allowed to live in a group. Since these times, breeders have been working to breed even tempered dogs that are suitable for both hunting and family life.

The AWS has a mind of its own at times and reaches peak performance with the owner who is dedicated to teaching the dog just what is expected of it. The breed takes well to training, and especially excels at training that offers some variety rather than routine training drills. However, members of the breed can may have issues with food possessiveness. They can be stubborn, and mentally are slow to mature from puppyhood. Some lines of the breed still retain dominant and aggressive temperaments; other than these lines, the AWS gets on well with children and enjoys playing with them. Even though they were originally bred to hunt, due to their size, they are suitable for apartment living as long as they receive enough exercise.

== Health ==
Pack breeding early in its development led to a level of genetic variation, so the hereditary conditions of more popular breeds are not common in the AWS. The breed however is known to suffer from eye issues including cataracts and progressive retinal atrophy. Inheritance is suspected in both conditions, with the average age of cataract onset at under one year old.

Additional concerns are hypothyroidism, allergies, epilepsy, diabetes and glandular disorders which may cause baldness. The hair loss occurs at around six months of age, affecting the neck, thighs and tail; however the frequency has been reduced through work conducted by the breed clubs. Hip dysplasia is seen in around 8.3% of the breed, according to surveys conducted by the Orthopedic Foundation for Animals over a twenty five-year period between 1974 and 1999. This was one of the lower results of the sporting breeds, with Greyhounds coming lowest with 3.4%, and the related Boykin Spaniel coming in second highest at 47%. There was no evidence of elbow dysplasia found. The breed has an average life span of 10–13 years.
