= English Water Spaniel =

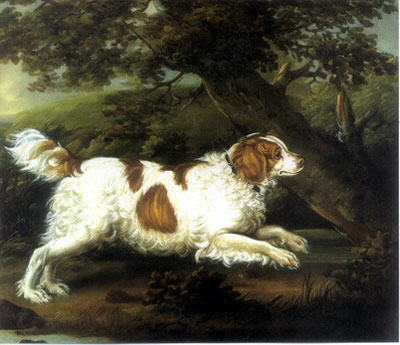
- "Quaille, an English Water Spaniel" (1797) by Henry Bernard Chalon (1770–1849)
- Other names: Water Dog; Water Rug
- Origin: United Kingdom
- Breed status: Extinct

The English Water Spaniel is a breed of dog that has been extinct since the first part of the 20th century, with the last specimen seen in the 1930s. It was best known for its use in hunting waterfowl and for being able to dive as well as a duck. It is described as similar to a Collie or to a cross between a Poodle and a Springer Spaniel with curly fur and typically in a white and liver/tan pattern.

Pre-dating the Irish Water Spaniel and thought to have been referred to by Shakespeare in Macbeth, it is believed to have genetically influenced several modern breeds of dog, including the American Water Spaniel, Curly Coated Retriever and the modern variety of Field Spaniel. It is unknown if the breed was involved in the creation of the Irish Water Spaniel.

== History ==
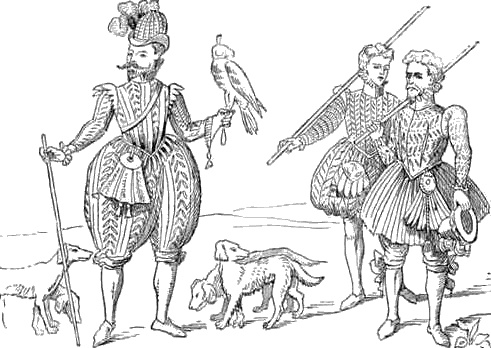
A 16th-century hawking party accompanied by Water Spaniels.

In 1565, Henry Stuart, Lord Darnley, the husband of Mary, Queen of Scots, was given a Water Spaniel by James Melville of Halhill. The dog had been brought to Scotland by an English merchant.

In 1570, Dr John Caius described the Water Spaniel. It has been suggested that Shakespeare also knew the breed "for he mentions the 'water rug' in Macbeth. " Furthermore, Shakespeare specifically mentions the breed in Act III Scene 1 of The Two Gentlemen of Verona when Launce says of his love, "She hath more qualities than a water-spaniel."

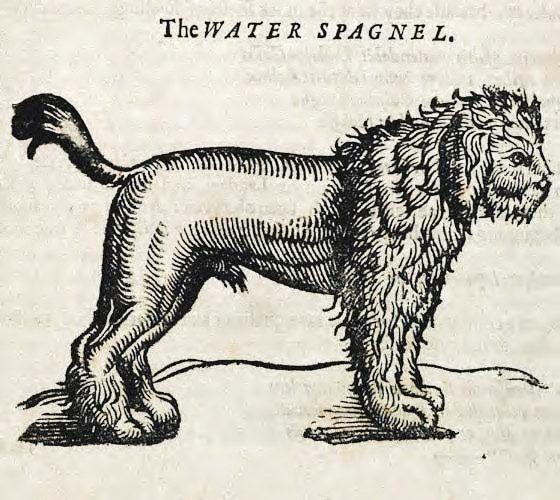
Water Spagnel

The breed is mentioned specifically by name as early as 1802, in Sportsman's Cabinet, where it is described as having "hair long and naturally curled, not loose and shaggy"; the description accompanied an engraving of a liver and white curly-coated spaniel. This shows that they pre-date the Irish Water Spaniel which was not developed as a breed until the 1830s. Unfortunately as the person credited with developing the Irish Water Spaniel, Justin McCarthy, left no written records, it is unknown if the English Water Spaniel was involved in its development. During the first half of the 18th century, the English Water Spaniel was used primarily for duck hunting in East Anglia.

The Kennel Club initially had a class for "Water spaniels other than Irish" as no standard was specifically set up for the English Water Spaniel and the judging of this class was described as "chaos" by Hugh Dalziel in British Dogs: Their Varieties, History, Characteristics, Breeding, Management, And Exhibition. Writing in 1897, Dalziel said of the breed, "I do not believe the breed is lost, but that scattered throughout the country there are many specimens of the old English water spaniel, which it only requires that amount of encouragement to breeding which it is in the power of show committees to give to perpetuate the variety and improve its form." Dalziel bemoaned the fact that while the Irish Water Spaniel continued, the English Water Spaniel was allowed to quietly be absorbed into other Spaniel breeds.

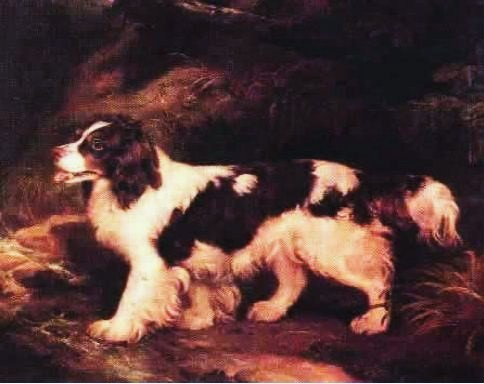
Water Spaniel (1815) by Ramsay Richard Reinagle (1775–1862)

The stud book of the Kennel Club also had a class for "Water spaniels other than Irish", however only fourteen dogs were registered in the twelve years up to 1903. This led some writers and judges of that time to believe that the English Water Spaniel was merely a cross of the Irish Water Spaniel as entrants in dogs shows in that same class do not match the description of the dog from earlier periods. Dogs awarded prizes as Water Spaniels during this period have been described as having "coats as flat as a Clumber, but with a bit of longish hair about the top of the skull."

Writing in 1967, author John F. Gordon stated, "After two centuries of breeding it is now extinct. None have been seen for over thirty years." Descendant breeds of the English Water Spaniel are thought to include the American Water Spaniel, which was also developed using additional stock from the Irish Water Spaniel and the Flat Coated Retriever breeds. The Curly Coated Retriever is considered to have descended from the Poodle, the retrieving setter, the St. John's water dog and the English Water Spaniel. Records for the origin of the modern Field Spaniel are more precise and show that one of the four progenitor dogs used in creating the breed was an English Water Spaniel-Cocker Spaniel cross which was registered at the time as a Sussex Spaniel due to his liver colour.

== Appearance ==
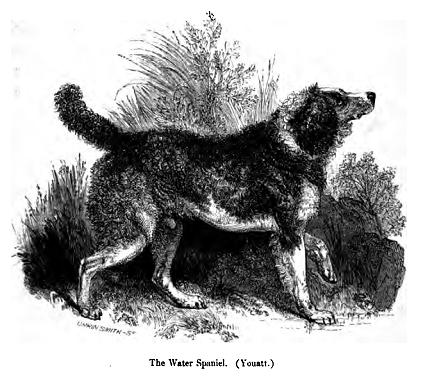
An 1859 drawing of a Water Spaniel.

Very unlike the Irish Water Spaniel in appearance, the English Water Spaniel more closely resembled a curly-haired version of the Springer Spaniel, with some traits of the Collie, poodle, and setter. The white and liver (tan) dog stood about 20 inches (51 cm) tall and looked like a typical, lean, long-legged spaniel with long ears and tail, a white underbelly, and a brown back, except that it had the coat of a water dog.

The English Water Spaniel was described as having a long and narrow head, with small eyes and ears that were long and covered in thick curls of fur. The body was moderately stout and barrel shaped, but not as much as that of the Field Spaniel. Its legs were long and straight with large feet. The dog varied in size with the larger varieties known as "Water Dogs" and the smaller as "Water Spaniels".

Due to the English Water Spaniel's colours of liver (tan) and white, it has been suggested that the breed may have been the source of the colours now found in the modern English Springer Spaniel and Welsh Springer Spaniel breeds.

== Hunting ==
Paintings by Henry Bernard Chalon and Ramsay Richard Reinagle both show English Water Spaniels working with their masters hunting ducks. An engraving by Henry Thomas Alken Snr. shows a slightly different looking English Water Spaniel, but also reinforces its area of work by again showing it while duck hunting. In The Sportsman's Repository (1820), the author advises that if an individual wishes to hunt ducks or any other type of waterfowl, then the hunter had best use an English Water Spaniel.

The breed is described as swimming and diving as well as the ducks themselves; and they are intelligent enough to avoid being lured away from the nesting places. The author described the best variety of the breed to be those with long ears whose coat was white under the belly and around the neck but brown on the back.
