= English Cocker Spaniel =

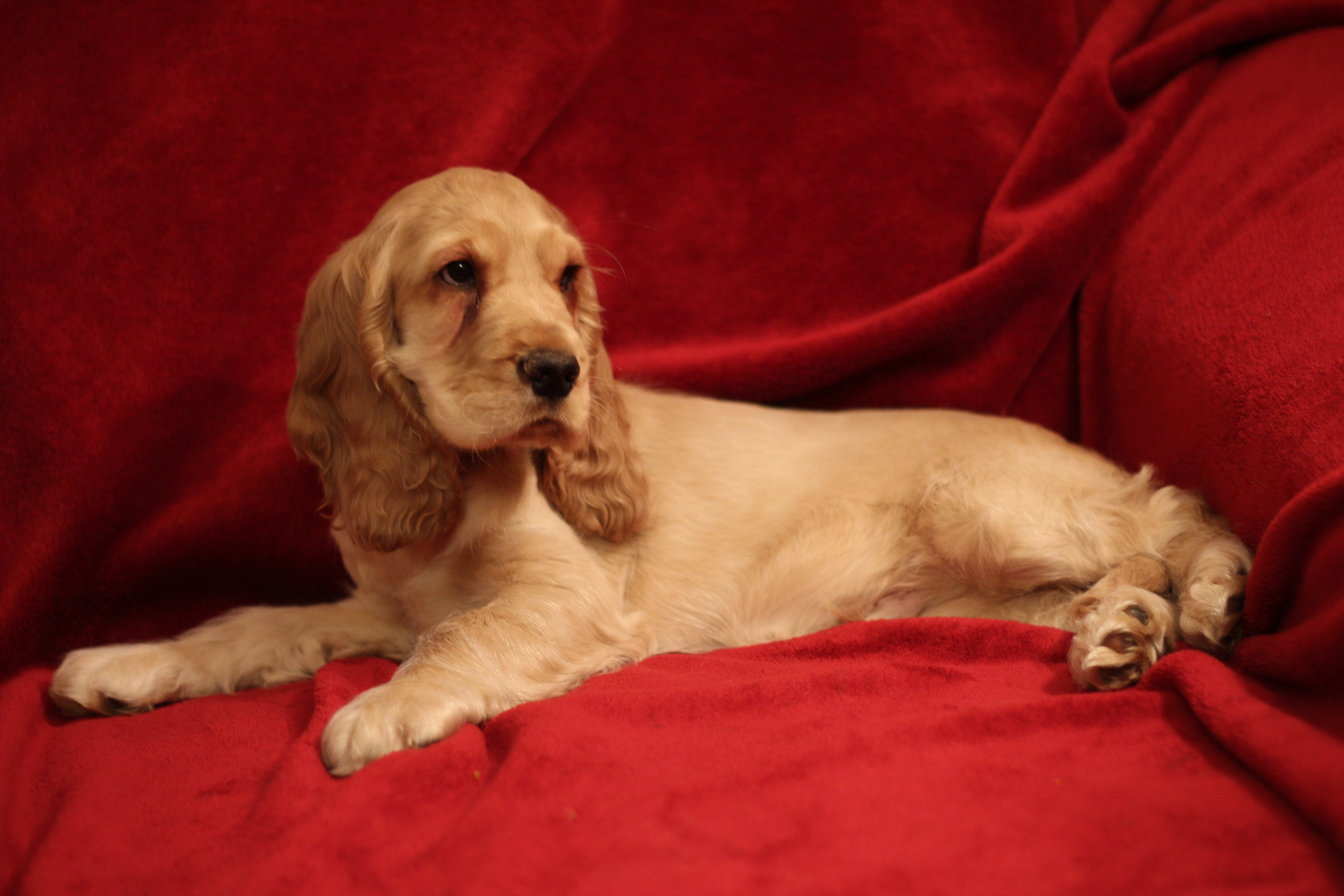
- Red English Cocker Spaniel
- Other names: Cocker Spaniel
- Common nicknames: Cocker, Cocker Spaniel
- Origin: England
Kennel club standards
- The Kennel Club: standard
- Fédération Cynologique Internationale: standard

The English Cocker Spaniel is a breed of gun dog. It is noteworthy for producing one of the most varied numbers of pups in a litter among all dog breeds. The English Cocker Spaniel is an active, good-natured, sporting dog standing well up at the withers and compactly built. There are "field" or "working" cockers and "house" cockers. It is one of several varieties of spaniel and is the foundation of its American cousin, the American Cocker Spaniel. The English Cocker is closer to the working-dog form of the Field Spaniel and the English Springer Spaniel. English Cocker Spaniels are also known as the "Merry Spaniel" due to their constantly wagging tails.

Outside the US, the breed is usually known simply as the Cocker Spaniel, as is the American Cocker Spaniel within the US. The OED states that the word cocker is derived from the fact the breed was used to flush woodcocks.

== History ==
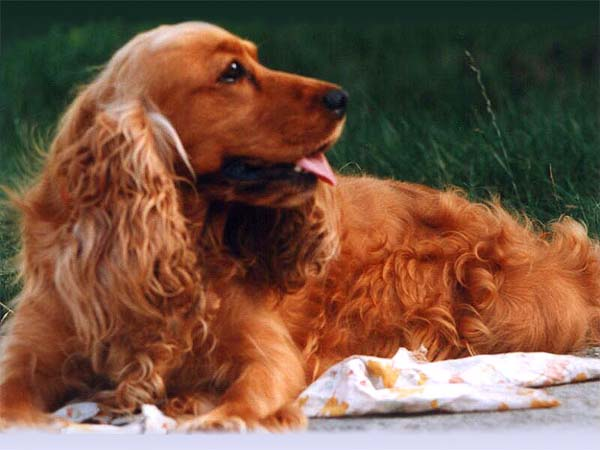
Red solid colour English Cocker Spaniel

Spaniel type dogs have been found in art and literature for almost 500 years. Initially, spaniels in England were divided among land spaniels and water spaniels. The differentiation among the spaniels that led to the breeds that we see today did not begin until the mid-19th century. During this time, the land spaniels became a bit more specialised and divisions among the types were made based upon weight. According to the 1840 Encyclopedia of Rural Sports, Cockers were 12–20 lb (5.5–9 kg). At this time it was not uncommon for Cockers and Springers to come from the same litter. Even a puppy from a "Toy" sized lineage could grow to be a springer.

There is no indication from these early sources that spaniels were used to retrieve game. Rather they were used to drive the game toward the guns.

During the 1850s and 1860s, other types of Cockers were recorded. There were Welsh Springer Spaniels and Devonshire Cockers. Additionally, small dogs from Sussex Spaniel litters were called Cockers. In 1874 the first stud books were published by the newly formed kennel club. Any spaniel under 25 lb (11 kg) was placed in the Cocker breeding pool, however, the Welsh Cocker was reclassified as a Springer in 1903 due to its larger size and shorter ear.

The sport of conformation showing began in earnest among spaniels after the Spaniel Club was formed in 1885. When showing, the new Springer and Cocker, both were in the same class until The Spaniel Club created breed standards for each of the types. The Kennel Club separated the two types eight years later. Since then, the Springer and Cocker enthusiasts have bred in the separate traits that they desired. Today, the breed differs in more ways than weight alone.

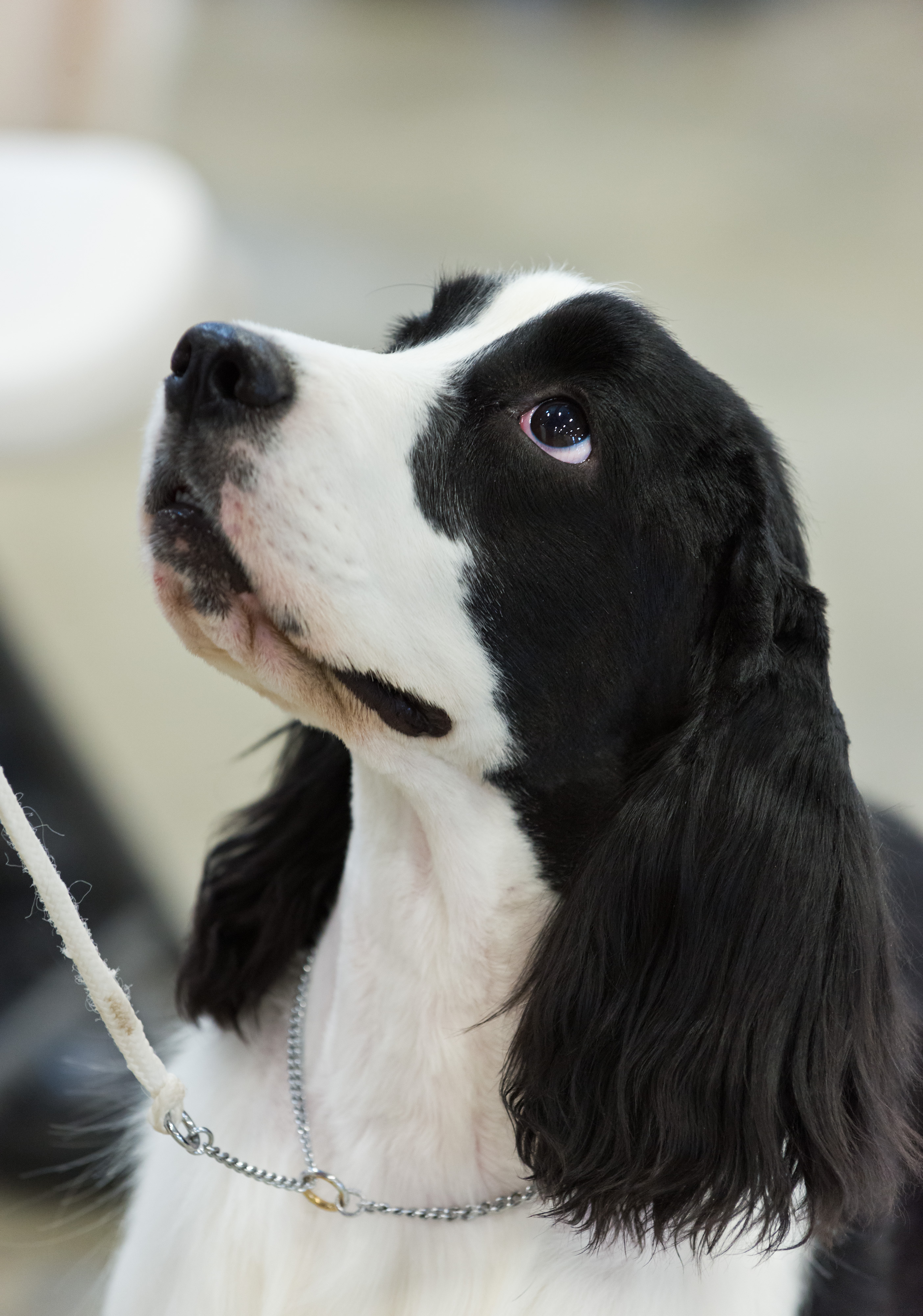
English Cocker Spaniel

At Crufts, the English Cocker Spaniel has been the most successful breed in winning Best in Show, winning on a total of seven occasions between 1928 and 2009, with wins in 1930, 1931, 1938, 1939, 1948, 1950 and 1996. In addition, the breed makes up three of the four winners who have won the title on more than one occasion with all three coming from H. S. Lloyd's Ware kennel. Due to World War II, the English Cocker Spaniel managed to be the only breed to have won the title between 1938 and 1950, although the competition was only held on four occasions during that period. The most recent best in show was Sh. Ch. Canigou Cambrai in 1996.

=== Field Spaniel ===
In the late 19th century with the increase in popularity of dog shows and the creation of standards for various breeds, the Spaniel family began to split into various different breeds. A group of enthusiasts decided to create a large black spaniel breed. Four dogs would act as progenitors for this new breed, of which two were Cocker Spaniels, one was a Cocker Spaniel/English Water Spaniel cross and one was a Norfolk Spaniel. This new breed was named the Field Spaniel, and was recognised by the Kennel Club in 1892.

=== American Cocker Spaniel ===
The American Cocker Spaniel was developed from the English Cocker Spaniel in the 19th century to retrieve quails and woodcocks. They were originally divided from the English Cocker solely on a size basis but were bred over the years for different specific traits. The two Cocker Spaniels were shown together in America until 1936, when the English Cocker received status as a separate breed. The American Kennel Club granted a separate breed designation for the English Cocker Spaniel in 1946. The American breed has a shorter snout.

== Description ==
The English Cocker Spaniel is a sturdy, compact and well-balanced dog. It has a characteristic expression showing intelligence and alertness. Its eyes should be dark and its lobular ears should reach "a bit past" the tip of the nose when pulled forward. Today, a significant difference in appearance exists between field-bred and conformation show-bred dogs. The Cocker's tail is customarily docked in North America. In countries where docking is legal, the tail is generally docked at about 4–5 inches (10–13 cm) in field-bred dogs while show dogs are generally docked closer to the body. Docking is now illegal in Australia and South Africa. In England and Wales, docking can only be carried out on dogs where the owners have proved that the dogs will be used as working or shooting dogs.

The breed standard indicates that the males of the breed are on average between 15.5 and 16 inches (39 and 41 cm) at the withers with the females a little smaller, growing to between 15 and 15.5 inches (38 and 39 cm). Both males and females of the breed weigh approximately 13–14.5 kilograms (29–32 lb). American Cocker Spaniels are smaller, with males being on average between 14.25 and 15.5 inches (36.2 and 39.4 cm) and females again being smaller on average at between 13.5 and 14.5 inches (34 and 37 cm), both weighing approximately 11–13 kilograms (24–29 lb).

The English Cocker Spaniel is similar to the English Springer Spaniel and at first glance, the only major difference is the larger size of the Springer. However, English Cockers also tend to have longer, and lower-set ears than English Springer Spaniels. In addition, Springer Spaniels also tend to have a longer muzzle, their eyes are not as prominent and the coat is less abundant.

=== Colour ===
The breed standard of the United Kingdom's Kennel Club states that in solid colours, no white is allowed except for a small amount on the chest and the American Kennel Club has standards for features including the expression, neck, topline, and body. In working Cockers, breeders value working ability over the colour of the dog.

Solid English Cocker colours can come in black, liver/brown, red/golden with black or brown pigmentation and Parti-coloured cockers come in blue roan, liver roan, orange roan with black or brown pigmentation, lemon roan with black or brown pigmentation, black and white ticked, liver and white ticked, orange and white ticked with black or brown pigmentation, lemon and white ticked with black or brown pigmentation, black and white, liver and white with brown pigmentation, orange and white with black or brown pigmentation, lemon and white with black or brown pigmentation.

Of the solid colours, sable is considered rare and controversial and is classified by some countries as being a type of parti-colour on account of its mixed hair shafts. While some have claimed this colour is from a cross with a different breed, geneticists have discovered English Cocker sable is unique to this breed. In addition, a silver/ash colour, usually associated with the Weimaraner dog, is considered genetically possible but is yet to be recorded by the United Kingdom's Kennel Club. Of the roan varieties, lemon roan with a light brown pigmentation is the most recessive of all the roans. Plain white Cockers are rarely born and not encouraged in the breed.

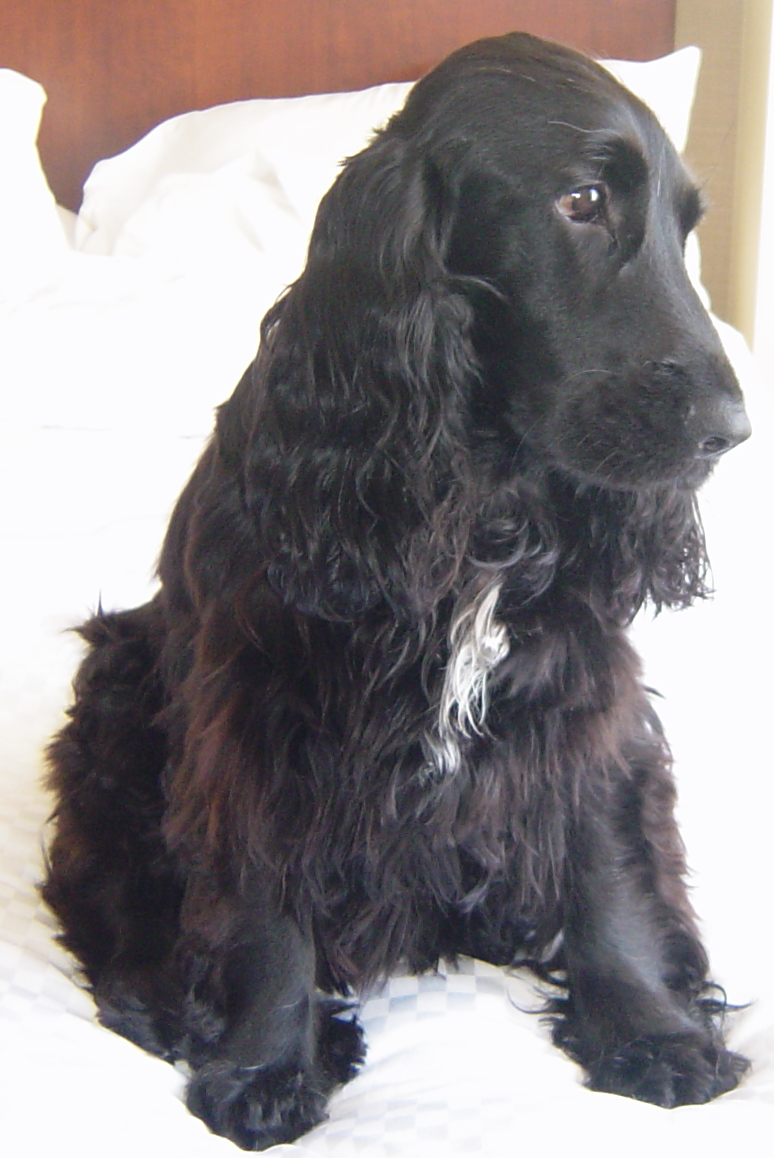
Solid black with acceptable amount of white on chest

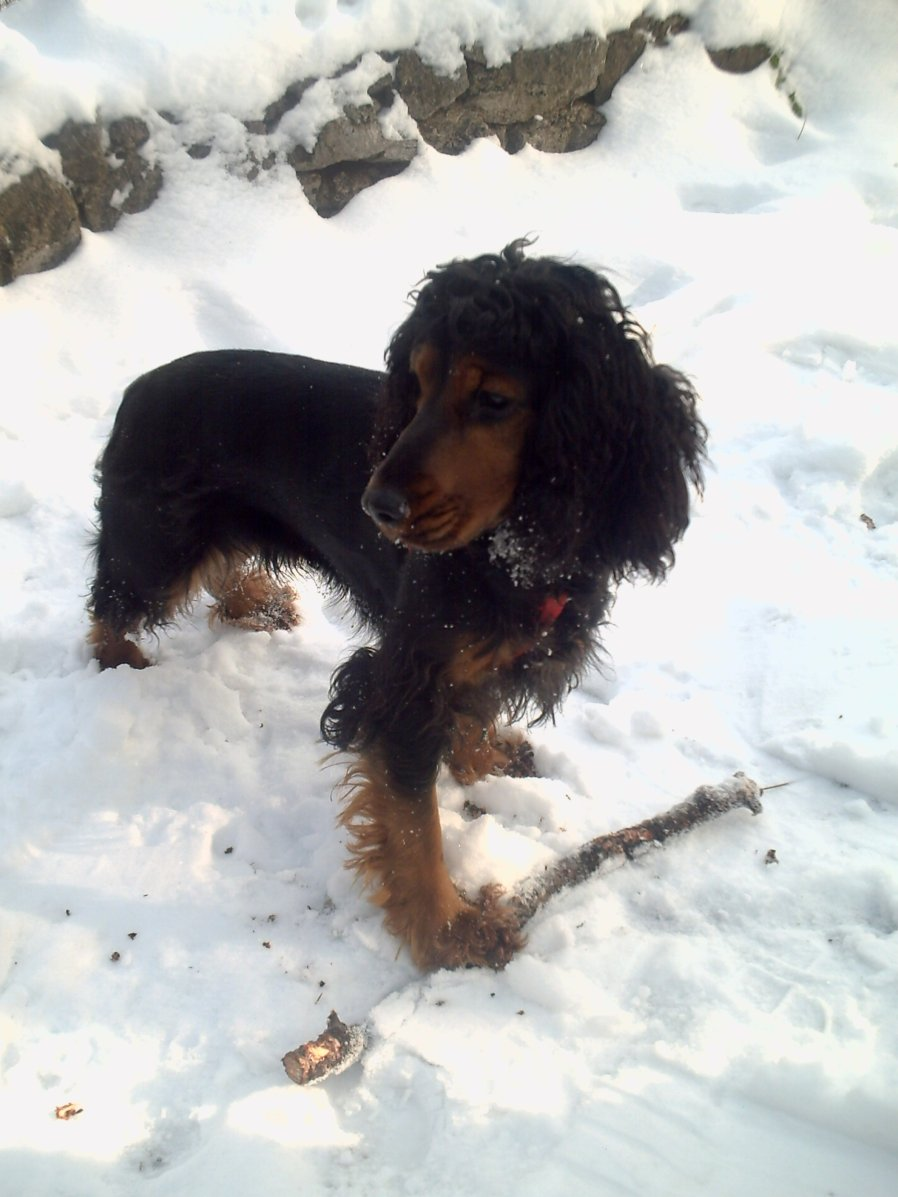
Black and tan

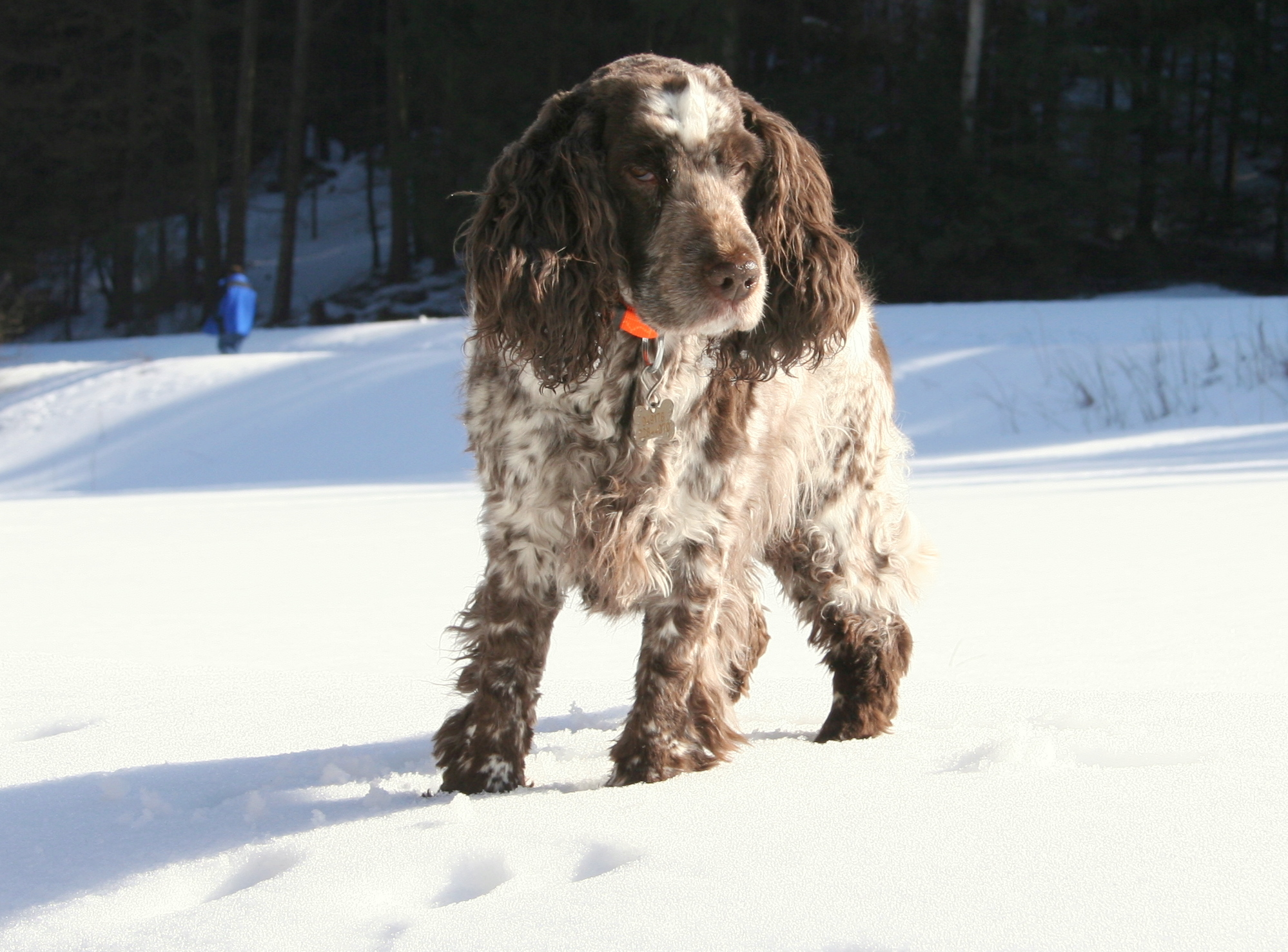
Liver Roan

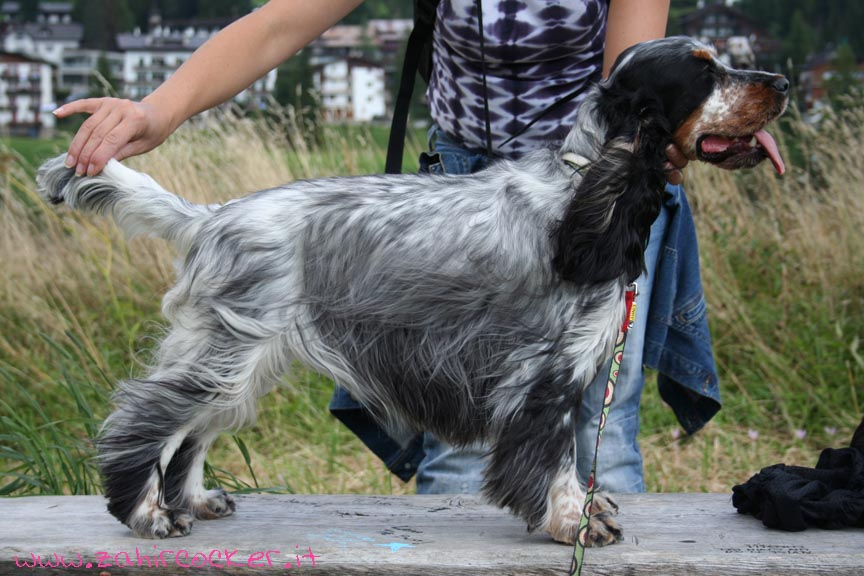
Blue Roan and Tan

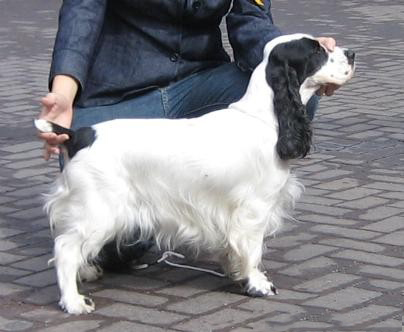
Black and White

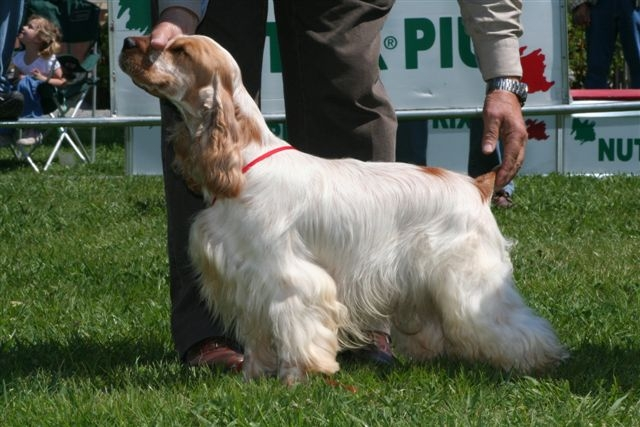
Orange and white

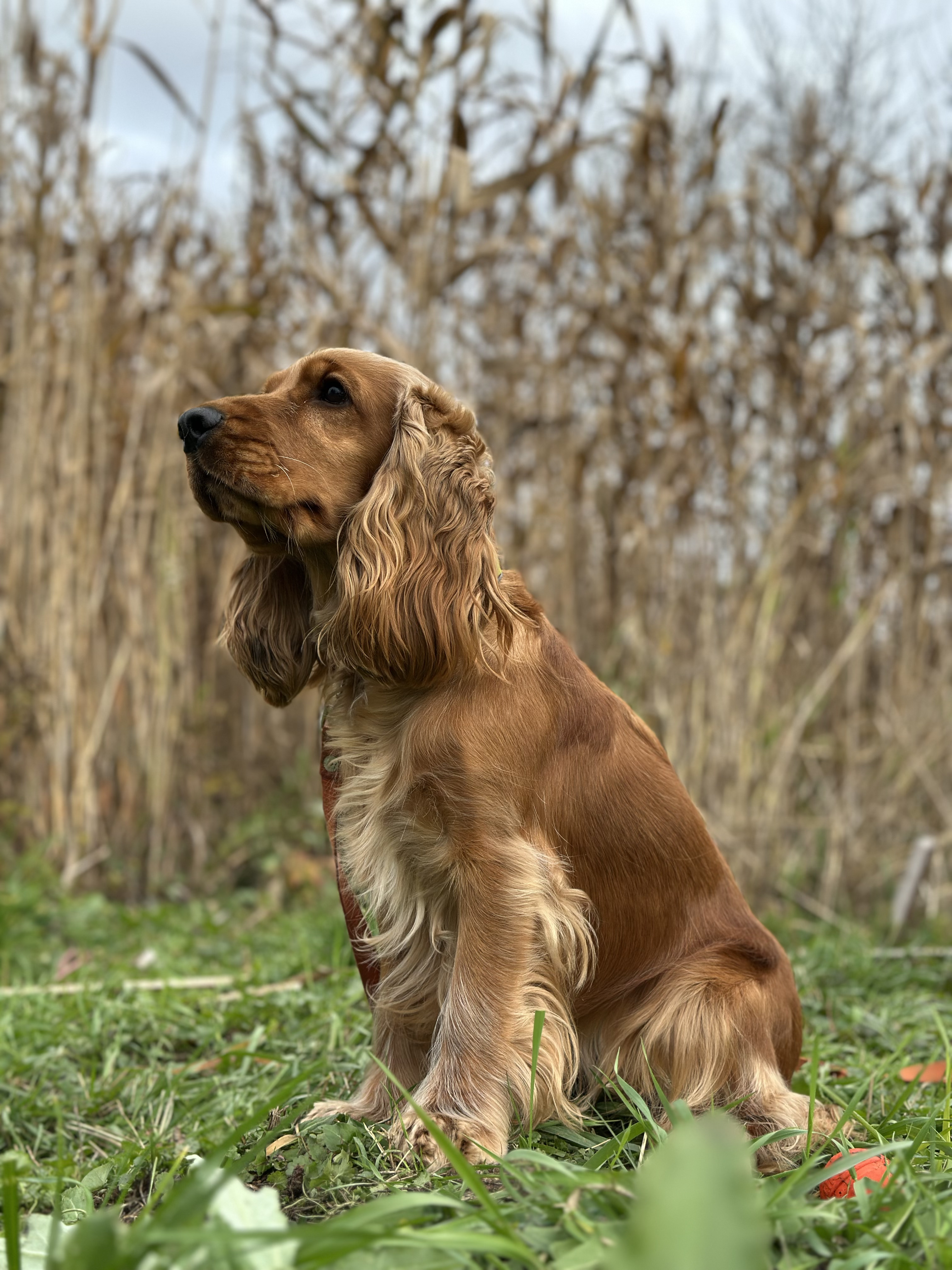
Red

== Temperament ==
The English Cocker Spaniel ranks 18th in Stanley Coren's The Intelligence of Dogs, being of excellent working/obedience intelligence.

With a good level of socialisation at an early age, Cocker Spaniels can get along well with people, children, other dogs and other pets. This breed is friendly and prefers to be around people; it is not best suited to the backyard alone. Cockers can be easily stressed by loud noises and by rough treatment or handling. When rewarded and trained kindly, the Cocker Spaniel will be an obedient and loving companion with a happy, cheerful nature.

== Health ==
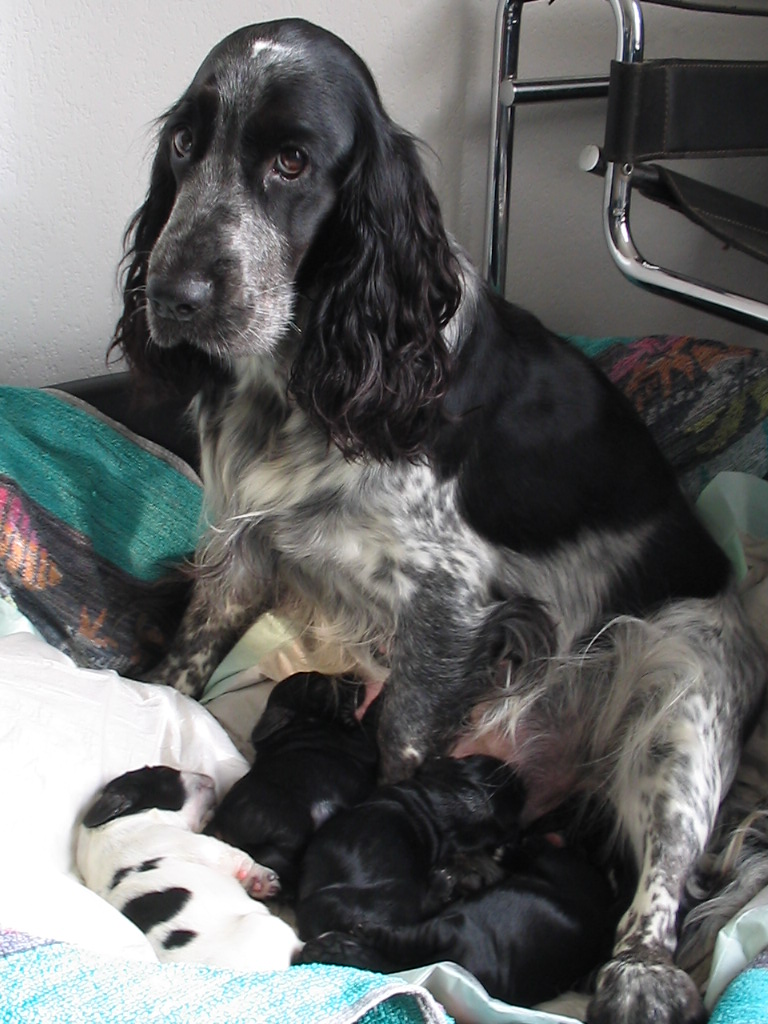
English Cocker with puppies

A 2022 UK study of veterinary clinic data found a life expectancy of 11.31 years slightly above the 11.21 overall average but below the 11.82 average for crossbreeds. A 2024 UK study found a life expectancy of 13.3 years for the breed compared to an average of 12.7 for purebreeds and 12 for crossbreeds. A 2024 Italian study found a life expectancy of 13 years for the breed compared to 10 years overall.

A 1996 study made by the University of Cambridge surveying 932 English Cocker Spaniel households throughout Britain found owners to report higher aggression in different coloured English Cocker Spaniels depending on the scenario. A 2009 study by Spanish researchers at the Autonomous University of Barcelona found that English Cocker Spaniels were more frequently produced to a referral clinic for aggression and that they had more impulsive attacks than other dogs. However, the notion of 'cocker rage' has been dismissed as a myth.

A review of 2,318 English Cocker Spainels attending veterinary care found the most common conditions to be: periodontal disease with 20.97% prevalence, otitis externa with 10.09% prevalence, obesity with 9.88% prevalence, anal sac impaction with 8.07% prevalence, diarrhoea with 4.87% prevalence, and aggression with 4.01% prevalence.

The English Cocker Spaniel is predisposed to chronic hepatitis, with one study finding the breed to be 2.78 times more likely to acquire the disease.

The English Cocker Spaniel is one of the more commonly affected breeds for progressive rod-cone degeneration. An autosomal recessive mutation in the PRCD gene is responsible for the condition in the breed.

== Working Cockers ==
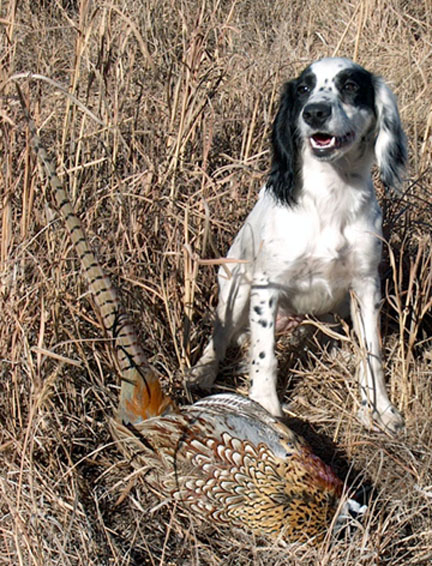
A field-bred English Cocker Spaniel with its quarry, a Common pheasant

This breed, like many others with origins as working dogs, has some genetic lines that focus on working-dog skills and other lines that focus on ensuring that the dog's appearance conforms to a breed standard; these are referred to as the "working" (or "field-bred") and "conformation" strains, respectively. After World War II, Cocker Spaniels bred for pets and for the sport of conformation showing increased enormously in popular appeal, and, for a while, was the most numerous Kennel Club registered breed. This popularity increased the view that all Cockers were useless as working dogs. However, for most dogs this is untrue, as even some show-bred Cockers have retained their working instinct.

Today, this breed is experiencing a resurgence in usage as a working and hunting dog. Dogs from working lines are noticeably distinct in appearance. As is the case with the English Springer Spaniel, the working type has been bred exclusively to perform in the field as a hunting companion. Their coat is shorter and ears less pendulous than the show-bred type. Although registered as the same breed, the two strains have diverged significantly enough that they are rarely crossed. The dogs that have dominated the hunt test, field trial and hunting scene in the United States are field-bred dogs from recently imported English lines. Working-dog lines often have physical characteristics that would prevent them from winning in the show ring. This is a result of selecting different traits than those selected by show breeders. The longer coat and ears, selected for the show ring, are an impediment in the field. Cuban authorities train and use English Cocker Spaniels as sniffer dogs to check for drugs or food products in passengers' baggage at Cuban airports.

== See also ==
- List of dog breeds
