= Exercise-induced collapse =

Genetic disorder of dogs

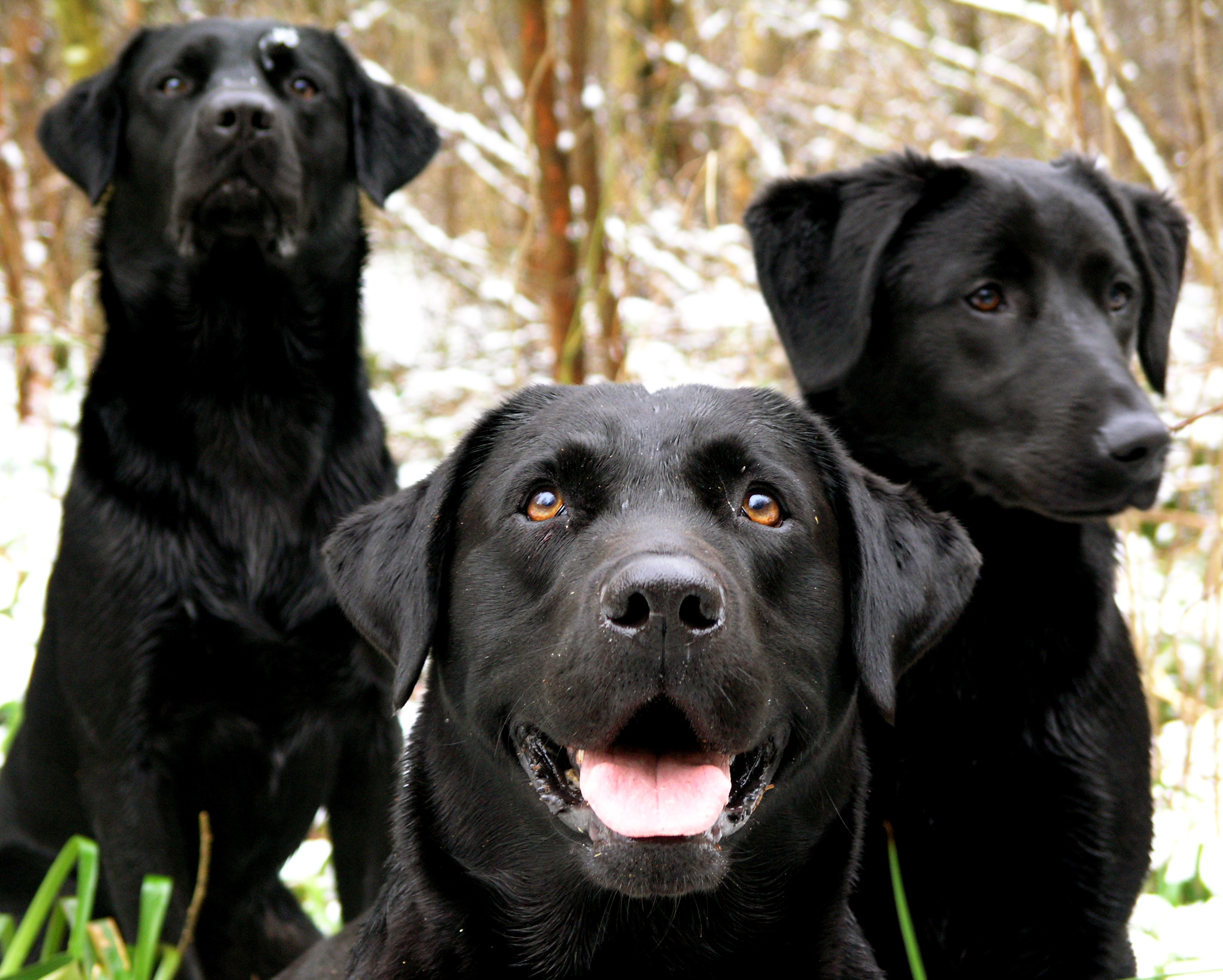

Exercise-induced collapse (EIC) is a genetic disorder that causes dogs of certain breeds to collapse after a period of intense exercise. The breeds affected are primarily sporting dogs (retrievers, spaniels).

== Description ==
Exercise-induced collapse (EIC) is a genetic disorder, mainly found in Labrador Retrievers, Chesapeake Bay Retrievers, Curly Coated Retrievers, and Boykin Spaniels. The genetic mutation has also been seen in a few cases in Cocker spaniels, German wire-haired pointers, Old English Sheepdogs, Bouvier des Flandres, Pembroke Welsh Corgis and Clumber Spaniels. Signs are most likely to first become apparent in young dogs when they enter heavy training, which is usually between 5 months and 1 year of age. Dogs of either sex can be affected. Dogs with this condition are always normal at rest and are described as being extremely fit, prime athletic specimens of their breed.

Dogs affected with this have no problem with regular exercise. The collapse occurs only with very strenuous exercise such as retrieving or participating in trials. Added excitement coincidental with the heavy exercise is more likely to bring on the collapse. Not all dogs with the disorder have an episode each time they exercise. It appears that the condition is more likely to occur with warmer temperatures. The lives of dogs with EIC are normal if extreme exercise is avoided.

== Symptoms and diagnosis ==
During collapse the dog’s hind legs become weak until they are no longer able to support the dog’s weight. In the most extreme cases the dog’s front legs also go weak and the dog collapses, its leg muscles loose. [3] The episode generally lasts no more than 15 minutes over which time the dog returns to normal. The dog does not appear to be in pain during the collapse.

Physiological systems (nervous system, cardiovascular and musculoskeletal systems) all appear normal in these dogs, as is a blood analysis both apart from and during an episode of collapse. Although tests have revealed elevated body temperature during collapse (average 107.1F (41.7C), many up to 108F (42.2C)), these temperatures are no different to those in normal dogs who have undertaken the same level of exercise.

== Research ==
Research into the condition has been done at the Western College of Veterinary Medicine at the University of Saskatchewan, the College of Veterinary Medicine at the University of Minnesota, and the Comparative Neuromuscular Laboratory at the School of Medicine of the University of California. The cause has been identified as a mutation is in the gene for dynamin-1 (DNM1). This gene is a protein that plays a key role in repackaging synaptic vesicles containing neurotransmitters. The action of DNM1 is only triggered with a high level of sustained exercise when it is needed for synaptic transmission in the brain and spinal cord.

The gene is recessive and for the dog to exhibit the exercise-induced collapse it must have two copies of the gene.[4] Nearly 40% of all Labrador retrievers that were tested for the gene between 2008 and 2017 were carriers, meaning they had one copy of the mutation. Approximately 6% had two copies of the gene and therefore had the potential to exhibit the collapse during exercise. There has been widespread testing and selective breeding in the years since the test for EIC was developed which has led to a decline in EIC in Labrador retrievers.

== Testing ==
Through grants from the AKC CHF a patented DNA test was developed by the University of MN. The Orthopedic Foundation for Animals provides a public database for those dogs that are DNA tested.

== Other collapse disorders ==
The UMN VBS Genetics Lab is also investigating cases of "atypical collapse" and also "Border Collie Collapse" where the dog is a carrier or clear of the disease on the DNA test, but continues to exhibit signs of the EIC disease.
