= Curly-coated Retriever =

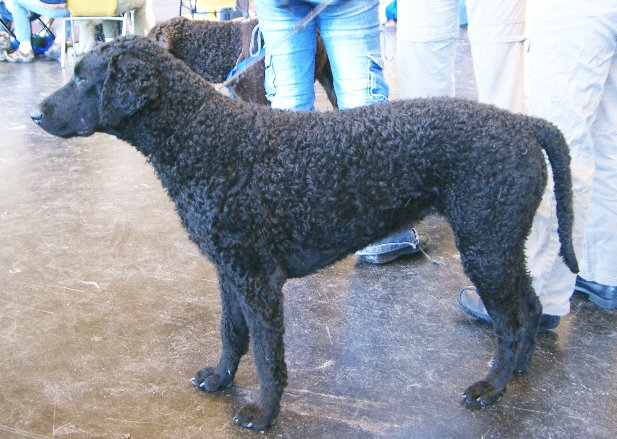
- A black Curly-coated Retriever is shown here. Curlies can also be liver in colour.
- Origin: United Kingdom - England
Kennel club standards
- The Kennel Club: standard
- Fédération Cynologique Internationale: standard

The Curly-coated Retriever (sometimes stylized as Curly Coated Retriever, and often called the Curly for short) is a breed of dog originally bred in England for upland bird and waterfowl hunting. It is the tallest of the retrievers and is easily distinguishable by the mass of tight curls covering its body. Curly Coated and Wavy Coated (now known as the Flat-Coated Retriever) were the first two recognised retriever breeds, established as early as 1860.

== Appearance ==
The Curly-coated Retriever is an active, well-muscled dog bred for upland bird and waterfowl hunting. The Curly-coated Retriever is somewhat different in structure than the more common retrievers. A Curly-coated Retriever will appear slightly leggy but is actually slightly longer than tall. It is balanced and agile with a significant air of endurance, strength, and grace. Curlies are soft-mouthed and regularly handle game with care. Show standards call for dogs to be between 25 and 27 inches (64 and 69 cm) at the withers, and for females to be between 23 and 25 inches (58 and 64 cm), however a wide range of sizes occurs, particularly in those dogs bred for the field, which generally run smaller. The country of origin breed standard calls for a taller dog and bitch, with only 27 inches (69 cm) for males and 25 inches (64 cm) for females listed. Weight should be in proportion to the height of the dog.

The breed sports a coat of tight, crisp curls. The tight curled coat of the Curly-coated Retriever repels water, burrs, and prevents damage that other sporting dogs with softer, thinner coats cannot escape. The only acceptable colours for the Curly-coated Retriever are solid black and solid liver. Occasional white hairs are permissible, but large white patches are a serious fault. Eyes should be either black or brown in black dogs, and brown or amber in liver dogs. Yellow eyes are unusual. The nose should be fully pigmented, and the same colour as the coat as the dog.

== Temperament ==
The Curly-coated Retriever was originally developed as a gamekeepers gun dog and their temperament and conformation reflect this purpose. Curly-coated Retrievers are still used in many countries as bird hunting companions, including in both upland and waterfowl hunting.

== Health ==
A 2024 UK study found a life expectancy of 12.2 years for the breed compared to an average of 12.7 for purebreeds and 12 for crossbreeds.

== See also ==
- List of dog breeds
- Chesapeake Bay Retriever
- Labrador Retriever
