= Irish Water Spaniel =

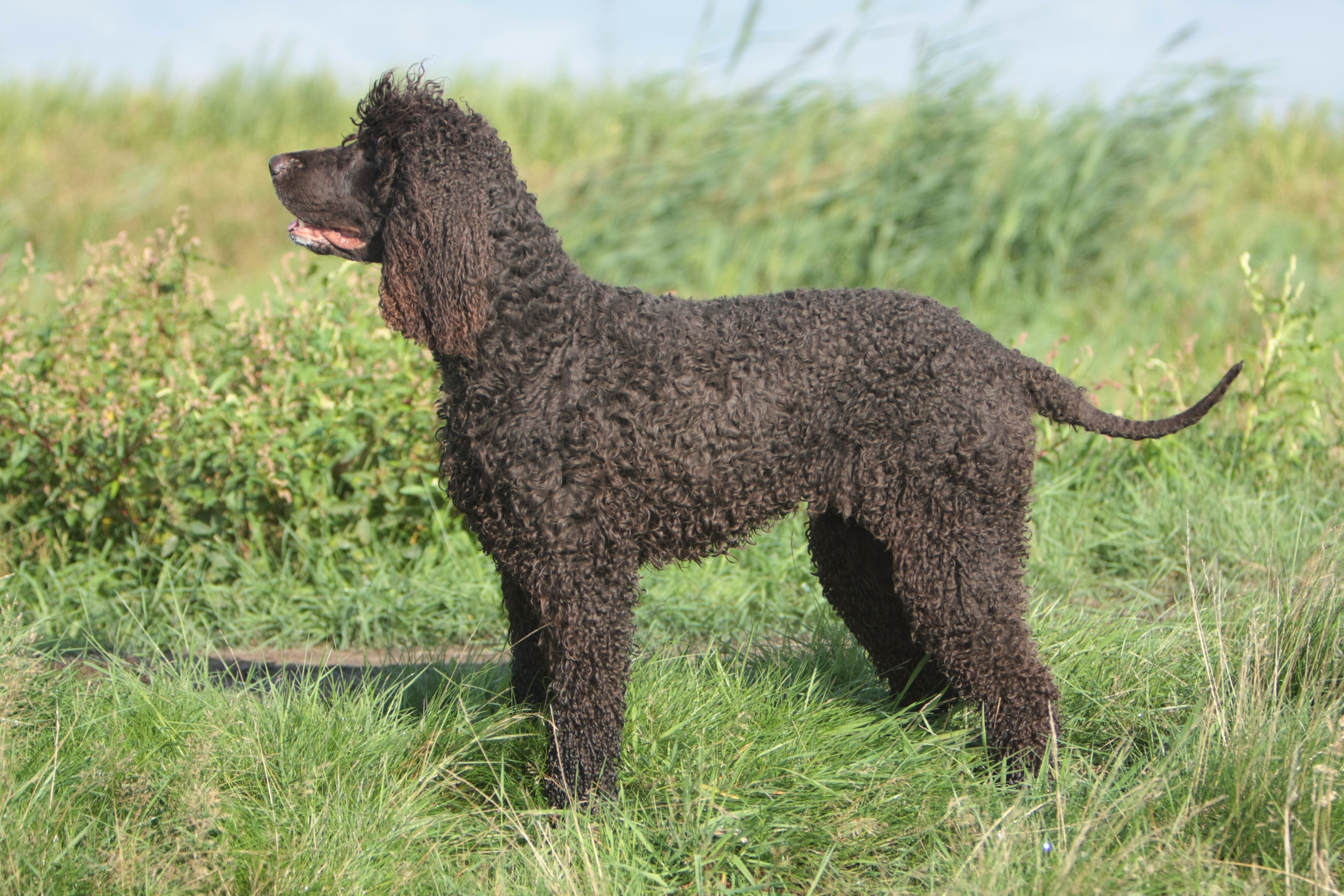
- Irish Water Spaniel
- Other names: Whiptail; Shannon Spaniel; Rat Tail Spaniel; Bog Dog
- Origin: Ireland
Kennel club standards
- Irish Kennel Club: standard
- Fédération Cynologique Internationale: standard

The Irish Water Spaniel (Irish: An Spáinnéar Uisce) is a breed of dog that is the tallest of the spaniels. It is one of Ireland's nine native dog breeds, also known as a "bog-dog". As a common hunting dog, they were often kept by historic landowning classes along with minor gentry, who commonly hunted and shot game. Performing a wide range of skills, such as the combined duties of pointers, setters, retrievers, and spaniels, they were a good fit for people who were unable to keep a team of dogs. The breed thrives in a working environment. They often love to please their owners, hunting and retrieving game happily. They are characterized by their curly coat, a distinctive "rat tail", and webbed feet, being very active and intelligent. They have a lifespan of about 10–12 years. Their inquisitive nature has earned them the nickname the "clown" of the spaniel family, and they'll often find surprising methods to complete tasks. Historically bred to hunt animals in marine settings such as marshes, today, their webbed feet make them skilled swimmers and are still used to hunt waterfowl. Now considered a rare breed, only a few thousand exist today, classifying them as a vulnerable native breed.

== Description ==
=== Appearance ===
The Irish Water Spaniel is a sturdy, cobby dog native to Ireland. The coat, consisting of dense curls, sheds very little. A topknot of long, loose curls grows downward from the crown of the head and often covers the eyes, with a "beard" growing at the back of the throat often being accompanied by "sideburns". The coat colour is a liver-puce to chocolate-brown hue, with a distinct "purple" undertone, not seen in many other breeds. The minimal coat shedding does not mean Irish Water Spaniels are necessarily "hypoallergenic", although people who may be allergic to dogs could potentially experience less of a reaction to them. Their coat has a natural oiliness to them.

In addition to their coat, the Irish Water Spaniel has several other distinguishing characteristics which places it amongst the more unique breeds, among these the most distinguishing being the smooth "rat tail" that tapers at the end, completely free of long hairs (except at the base, where it is covered for 2–3 inches with curls). The face is entirely smooth and, unlike the poodle, should require little or no trimming to stay that way. They have almond-shaped eyes, having a deep-hazel hue. Their expression is said to be alert and quizzical. An Irish Water Spaniel is ruggedly built and, given its name, is bred for the water. The breed has naturally webbed feet which aid in its powerful swimming skills. Altogether, the Irish Water Spaniel presents a picture of a smart, upstanding, strongly-built (but not leggy) dog, combining great intelligence and rugged endurance with a bold, dashing eagerness of temperament.

They are the largest of the Spaniel group. Dogs range in height from 22 to 24 inches (56–61 cm), and weigh 55 to 65 pounds (25–30 kg). Males will weigh around 55-56 pounds while females weigh slightly less at around 45 to 58 pounds.

=== Temperament ===
As with most breeds classed within the American Kennel Club's Sporting group, such as the various other spaniels, retrievers, setters, and pointers, the Irish Water Spaniel is, essentially, an active, willing and energetic companion. Similarly to its fellow sporting breeds, it has been bred from stock used to fetch game and return it undamaged, thus it maintains the natural instincts of loyalty and of wanting to please. The Water Spaniel has a keen sense of being a "team-player", which makes it a relatively easy breed to train and discipline from a young age. Because of its great intelligence and "quizzical" nature, it has the reputation of being the "clown" of the spaniels, and will often do ordinary things in extraordinary ways. Some individual dogs may be very wary of strangers, if not properly socialised early in life; likewise, not every Irish Water Spaniel can be trusted to get along with cats or small pets, including smaller dogs. Early socialisation and training is a must.

== History ==
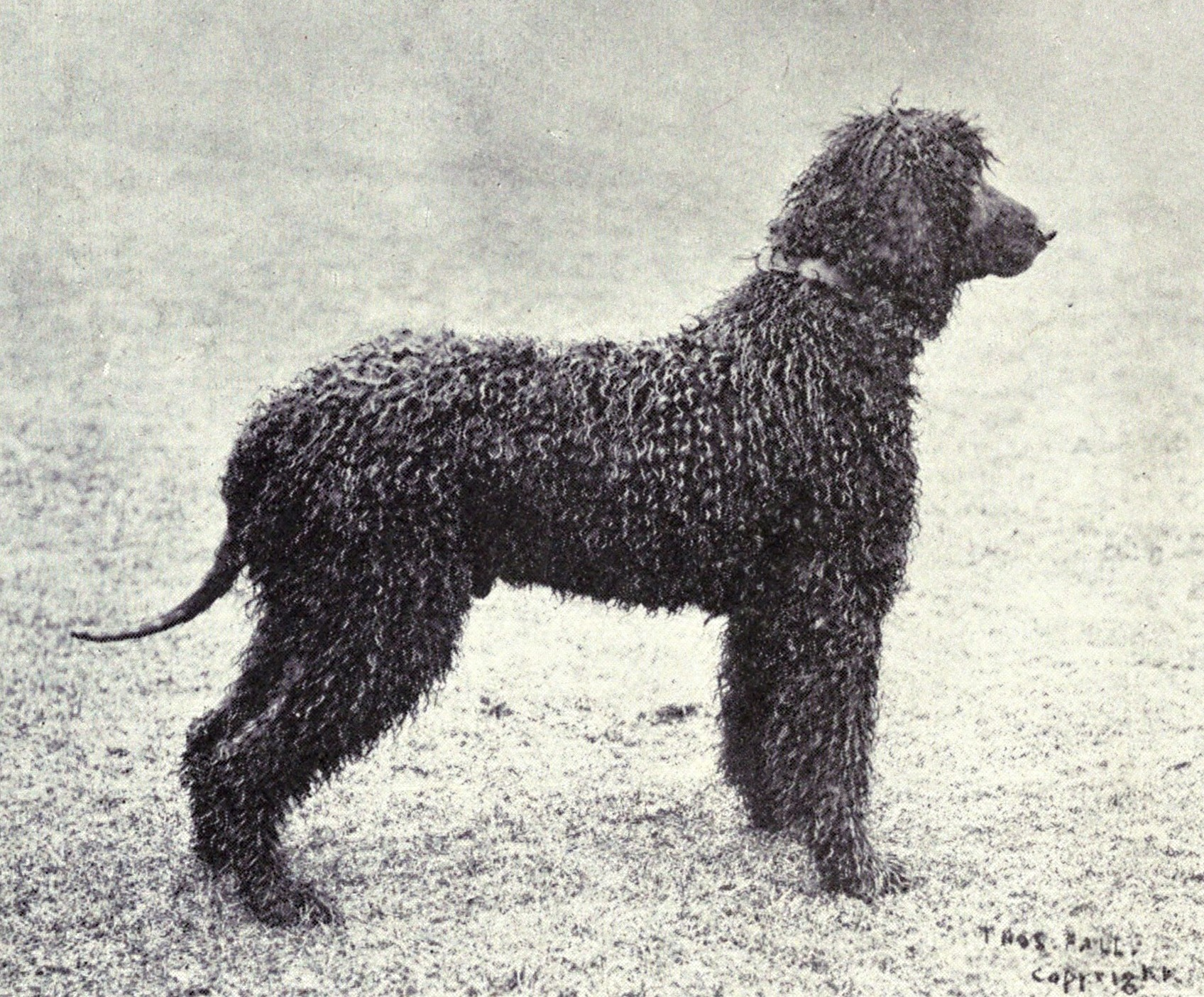
Irish Water Spaniel circa 1915

The modern breed as we know it was developed in Ireland in the 1830s. There is a strong case that the breed's ancestors originated in Persia and arrived in Ireland from Spain. However, it is not known from which other breeds Irish Water Spaniels were developed, as the acknowledged father of the breed, Justin McCarthy (from Dublin), left no breeding records. A range of breeds have been suggested, based largely on superficial traits, including the Poodle, Portuguese Water Dog, Barbet, generic "old water dogs", and the now-extinct English Water Spaniel, as well as the Northern and Southern Water Spaniels. However, whether or not Irish Water Spaniels are antecedents, descendants, or hybrids of these other breeds is a matter of some speculation. It is believed, in Irish folklore, to be the descendant of the mythological cryptid, the Dobhar-chú.

== Suitability as a pet ==
Irish Water Spaniels may make good family dogs, as they are usually excellent with respectful children and with other pets. They can make good guard dogs if they have been trained to do so, giving off a deep bark, and will protect their human families. Not usually an aggressive dog, Water Spaniels are nonetheless highly alert and sensitive to their surroundings.

All Irish Water Spaniels require a grooming regimen that includes maintaining healthy ears, teeth and nails. The tight double coat of the Irish Water Spaniel sheds lightly, thus many allergy sufferers have found them to be a comfortable breed with which to live or associate. The texture of the hair prevents the coat from becoming tightly woven into fabric and upholstery and any stray hairs are easily removed as they will gather together to form "dust bunnies". The coat can be maintained by even the novice owner if a regular effort is maintained to keep it clean and free of mats. A thorough combing to the skin should take place every 1–2 weeks to promote healthy skin and to remove any objects from the coat. Scissoring will be required every 6–8 weeks to neaten and shape the coat while regular exposure to water will promote the correct "ringlets" over the body coat.

Although happy to curl up and sleep at home, regular (possibly 2-3 times, daily) walks and exercise excursions are essential for a healthy, content Water Spaniel. An unexercised Water Spaniel may become a naughty, mischievous animal. An ideal home though would be a working environment, where the dogs' minds, as well as bodies, are exercised. Many Irish Water Spaniel owners work their dogs in the shooting field, in obedience tests, in agility competitions, or in the conformation show ring.

== Activities ==
The IWS is a versatile breed and is found in all types of canine events including:

- Championship
  - Junior Showmanship
- Companion events
  - Obedience trial
  - Rally obedience
  - Dog agility
  - Tracking trial
  - Fly ball
- Performance and other dog sports
  - Hunt tests
  - Field trial
  - Upland hunting
  - Dock jumping
  - Scent work / nose work

== Irish Water Spaniel Club of Ireland ==
The Irish Water Spaniel Club of Ireland is one of the oldest dog clubs in the world, supporting and promoting one of the most distinguished and oldest breed of dog in the world. The club is registered with the Irish Kennel Club.

== Irish Water Spaniel Club of America ==
The IWSCA is the AKC parent club for the IWS. The club exists to preserve and protect this rare breed. The Club helps educate owners and breeders and welcomes all members who share our love of this extraordinary, versatile dog. The IWSCA's commitment to the health of the Irish Water Spaniel is reflected in its endorsement of transparency in health findings in accordance with organisations such as Orthopedic Foundation of America (OFA), Canine Health Information Center (CHIC), Canine Eye Registration Foundation (CERF) and Canine Health Foundation.

=== IWSCA breeders ===
Most of the breeders in the IWSCA belong to the Breeders Education Committee (BEC) The BEC exists to inform and educate IWSCA breeders on issues of health, genetics and breeding practices designed to promote the ongoing health and welfare of the Irish Water Spaniel. To this end the BEC breeders have agreed to a rigorous set of recommended breeding practices such as: open information exchange, health testing in accordance with the Irish Water Spaniel CHIC protocol, collaboration with the IWSCA Health and Genetics Committee, participation in breed-specific health studies, promotion of responsible pet ownership, and responsibility for any puppy they have bred – for the life of that dog. Individual BEC breeders can be found on the IWSCA website.

== IWS Health Foundation ==
The IWS Health Foundation's aim is to serve the worldwide Irish Water Spaniel community by providing a forum for internet-based collection and circulation of information, research and educational materials relating to the health and life expectancy of the breed, and for anyone with an interest to promote research for the long-term benefit of the breed.

== Health ==
A 2024 UK study found a life expectancy of 10.8 years for the breed compared to an average of 12.7 for purebreeds and 12 for crossbreeds. Some major health concerns to watch out for in the breed include hip dysplasia and other joint problems, ear infections, alopecia, and distichiasis on occasion. Hip dysplasia affects a number of dog breeds, as it is when hip joints become mis-formed that cause pain and disability. This affects about 30% of the breed. Elbow dysplasia should also be looked out for, as it affects about 18% of the breed. About 14% of the breed experiences chronic ear infections, likely because of their long, drooping ears. This ailment can be resolved with good ear care. Another health issue that the breed may encounter are seizures. About 10% of the breed is affected by seizures, in which some may be a symptom of epilepsy.

== Work ==
The Irish Water Spaniel (furthest to the right) hunting with other dog breeds

The Irish Water Spaniel was originally bred to hunt waterfowl and upland birds on the marshes, bogs, and rivers of its native Ireland, as a result of its strong swimming skill. The breed has also been used to hunt a variety of different game because of its intelligence and excellent nose, eyesight, and hearing. In the workplace, they have been used drugs and explosives detectors and worked as therapy dogs.

== Popular culture ==
Although the Irish Water Spaniel is not a mainstream breed, having few features in popular culture, there are a few instances in which the breed has been a shown a spotlight. In Irish fiction, there are few of the breed that appear, but one that does is Maria, highlighted as a main character in Somerville and Ross' short story collection from the late 19th century.

The dog was also featured in Madraí na nGael, a six-part documentary series highlighting the nature of Ireland's nine native working dog breeds.

== Shows ==
There are several dedicated shows that allow owners to proudly exhibit their dog. The UK's IWS Association hosts about 3 major events a year.

In 1979, Ch. Oak Tree's Irishtocrat, also known as Dugan, won best-in-show honors at the Westminster Kennel Club event at Madison Square Garden, becoming the dog of the year as it was the first time in the event's 103-year history that the Irish Water Spaniel had won.

== See also ==
- List of dog breeds
