= Tweed Water Spaniel =

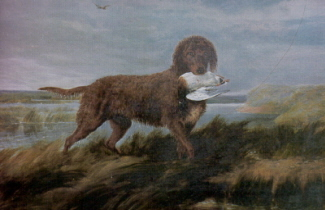
- "Water Spaniel" (most widely accepted image of a Tweed Spaniel)
- Other names: Tweed Spaniel; Ladykirk Spaniel
- Origin: England
- Breed status: Extinct

The Tweed Water Spaniel, or Tweed Spaniel, is a breed of dog extinct since the 19th century. It is best known for being involved in the early development of the modern Curly Coated Retriever and Golden Retriever breeds of dogs. They were described as generally brown, athletic dogs from the area around Berwick-upon-Tweed near the River Tweed and close to the Scottish Borders. A type of water dog, the breed was not well known outside the local area. This breed may have been created by crossing local water dogs with imported St. John's water dog, another breed which is also now extinct.

== History ==
The village of Norham, Northumberland, just south of the River Tweed was noted as being "long famous" for a breed of water spaniel of which were "invariably brown".

In 1816, Richard Lawrence wrote of the origins of the Tweed Water Spaniel, "Along rocky shores and dreadful declivities beyond the junction of the Tweed with the sea of Berwick, water dogs have derived an addition of strength, from the introduction of a cross with the Newfoundland dog, which has rendered them completely adequate to the arduous difficulties and diurnal perils in which they are systematically engaged." Although the quote refers specifically to the Newfoundland breed, it is actually more likely to mean the now extinct breed of the St. John's water dog which was sometimes referred to by its homeland's location of Newfoundland and Labrador.

Stanley O'Neil, an expert in Flat-coated Retrievers, wrote of the Tweed Water Spaniel in a letter during the late 19th century, "Further up the coast, probably Alnmouth, I saw men netting for salmon. With them was a dog with a wavy or curly coat. It was a tawny colour but, wet and spumy, it was difficult to see the exact colour, or how much was due to bleach and salt. Whilst my elders discussed the fishing I asked these Northumberland salmon net men whether their dog was a Water-Dog or a Curly, airing my knowledge. They told me he was a Tweed Water Spaniel. This was a new one on me. I had a nasty suspicion my leg was being pulled. This dog looked like a brown Water Dog to me, certainly retrieverish, and not at all spanielly. I asked if he came from a trawler, and was told it came from Berwick."

Linda P. Case, of the University of Illinois, speculated the Tweed Water Spaniel was so named because it was developed on the estate of Lord Tweedmouth, and in fact was simply the original name for a breed of dog that later became the Golden Retriever. However, this theory is against the documented evidence, as the early development of the Golden Retriever was fully documented and listed the three Tweed Water Spaniels involved specifically by breed.

== Appearance and temperament ==
The Tweed Water Spaniel had a long tail and a curly, liver-colored coat, and looked similar to the Irish Water Spaniel except it had a heavier muzzle and a pointed skull. The dog also had thick, slightly feathered, hound-like ears, droopy lips, and fore legs that were feathered, but hind legs that were not. Their size was that of a small retriever, with a liver-coloured curly coat. Instances of offspring which were liver-coloured but tan below the knees were noted in Hugh Dalziel's 1897 work British Dogs: Their Varieties, History, Characteristics, Breeding, Management, And Exhibition, although the author speculated this may have been due to Bloodhound ancestry in one of the parents of the litters.

The breed was known for its intelligence, courage, and sporting ability.

== Legacy ==
=== Golden Retriever ===
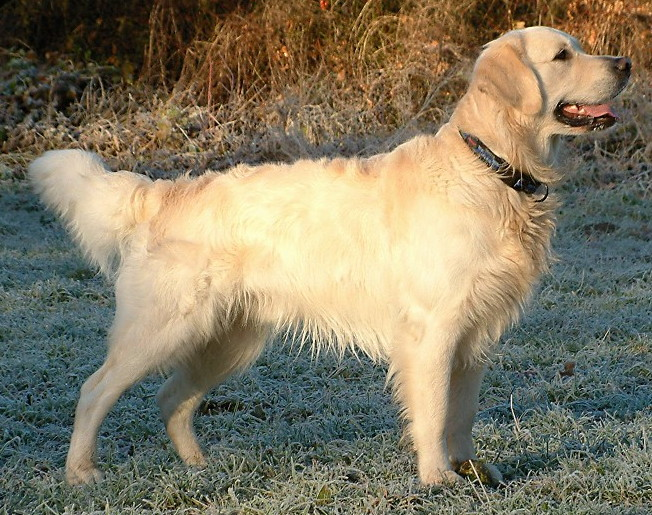
One of the first two dogs from which the modern Golden Retriever (pictured) is descended from was a Tweed Water Spaniel

Towards the end of the 19th century, Sir Dudley Coutts Majoribanks, Lord Tweedmouth, was developing a breed which was known at the time as a "yellow Retriever". This was unusual, as typically during this period all Retrievers were black. The main pairing from which the modern Golden Retrievers are said to have descended were from a dog named Nous that was a rare yellow Wavy-coated Retriever, and a female Tweed Spaniel named Belle that was given to Majoribanks by his cousin David Robertson. Four yellow puppies were produced from this pairing, named Ada, Crocus, Primrose and Cowslip.

Belle was not the only Tweed Spaniel in Majoribank's kennel. A further dog simply named Tweed was kept, although records show he was never bred, as he died at an early age. A second dog named Tweed was bred, to Cowslip from the previous Tweed/Retriever pairing which produced a further yellow puppy named Topsy. The two breeds were only crossbred two or three times, but began the development of the modern Golden Retriever.

=== Curly Coated Retriever ===
During the formation of the modern breed known as the Curly-coated Retriever, several breeds were used to bring their characteristics into this new breed. These included Poodles, Wetterhouns, Barbets, Irish Water Spaniels, Flat-coated Retrievers, and breeds that are now extinct, including the St John's water dog, the Large Rough Water Dog and the Tweed Water Spaniel. The Curly-coated Retriever has been considered purebred since the early 20th century.
