= Cantabrian Water Dog =

Spanish breed of dog

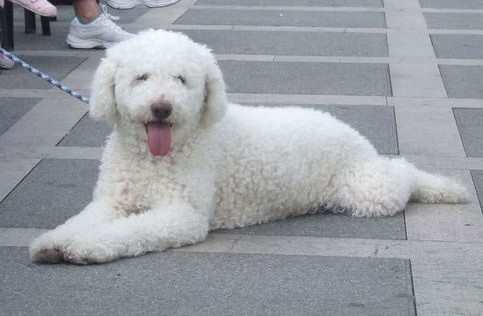
- Other names: Perro de Agua del Cantábrico; Perro de Lanas; Merlucero
- Origin: Spain
- Distribution: Cantabria
Traits
Height	Males	42–45 cm
	Females	40–43 cm
Weight	Males	15–17 kg
	Females	12–14 kg
- Coat: curled outer coat, thick undercoat; waterproof
- Colour: white
Kennel club standards
- Asociación Perro de Agua del Cantábrico: standard
- Notes: recognised in Spanish legislation

The Cantabrian Water Dog (Spanish: Perro de agua cantábrico), is a Spanish breed of water dog. It originates in coastal areas of Cantabria, in northern Spain, where it was used by fishermen for various tasks. It was officially recognised in Spanish law in 2012. It is not recognised by the Real Sociedad Canina de España, the national Spanish kennel club, but is listed among the Spanish breeds in the process of recovery.

The dogs are always white, and are in general smaller and lighter than examples of the Spanish Water Dog.

== History ==
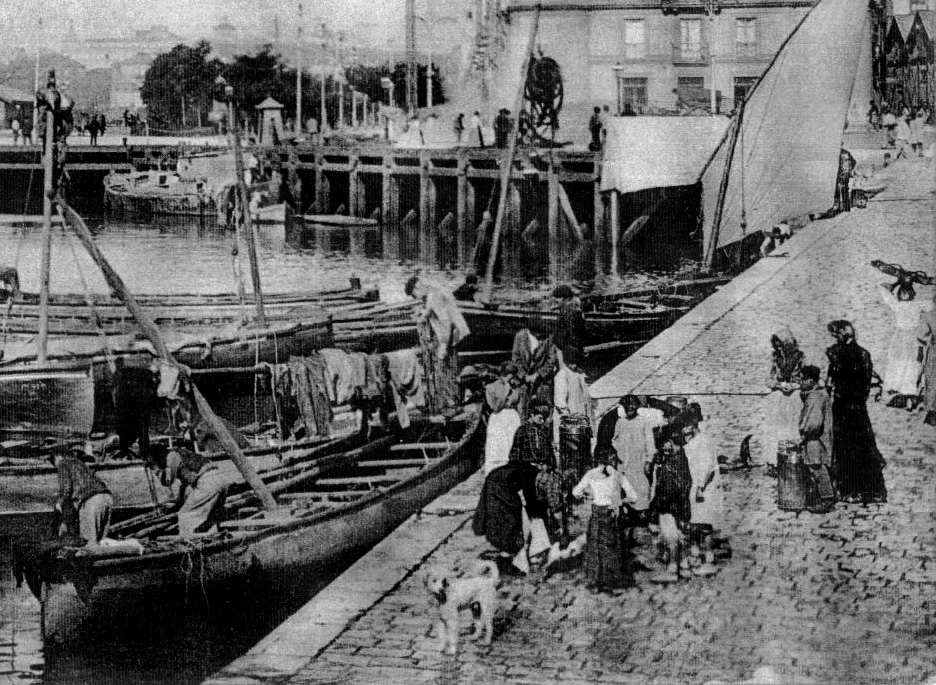
In the early twentieth century in the port of Santander, in Cantabria

The Cantabrian Water Dog is a traditional breed of the coastal areas of Cantabria, in northern Spain, where it was used by fishermen for various tasks. It may share some common origins with the French Barbet.

It was officially recognised in Spanish law in 2012, after a request for recognition from the Government of Cantabria was favourably received by the Comité de Razas ('breeds committee') of the Ministerio de Medio Ambiente y Medio Rural y Marino, as the Spanish ministry of agriculture was then known.

A census in 2009 found a total of 1216 of the dogs.

== Characteristics ==
The population of Cantabrian Water Dog shows a clear morphological and genetic differentiation that allows discrimination from other dog populations in the same group with close geographic distribution. One genetic study place it as close to the Spanish Water Dog as to the Barbet or Caniche. These animals are lighter and shorter than those of the Spanish breed, where they were previously included. Thus, 75% of males and 38% of females would be excluded from the breed standard for height at the withers, while using the criterion of weight, 91% of males and 80% females would be excluded.

== Use ==
The work of this breed has been traditionally related to fishing work: collecting fish that fell into the water, watching the ships when they were moored in port, taking the rope between ships and to the dock, or acting like a lifeguard.
