= Stabyhoun =

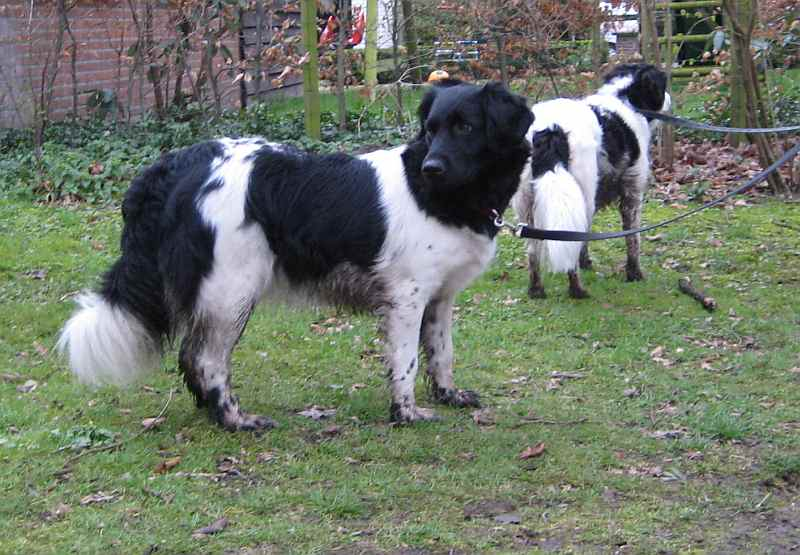
- A Stabyhoun
- Other names: Stabij; Beike; Stabijhoun; Fryske Stabij
- Common nicknames: Staby
- Origin: The Netherlands
Kennel club standards
- Dutch Kennel Club: standard
- Fédération Cynologique Internationale: standard

The Stabyhoun, or Stabijhoun or Stabij (in Frisian), is one of the rarest dog breeds in the world. It hails from the Dutch province of Friesland; its origins lie in the forested region of eastern and southeastern Friesland. The breed has been mentioned in Dutch literature dating back to the early 1800s, but it was not until the 1960s that the breed became known outside its native province; the first Stabyhouns left the Netherlands some decades later, in the 2000s. The name Stabijhoun translates roughly to "stand by [me] dog". The dog is considered a Dutch national treasure. Today, there are only a few thousand Stabyhouns worldwide.

== History ==
=== Origins ===
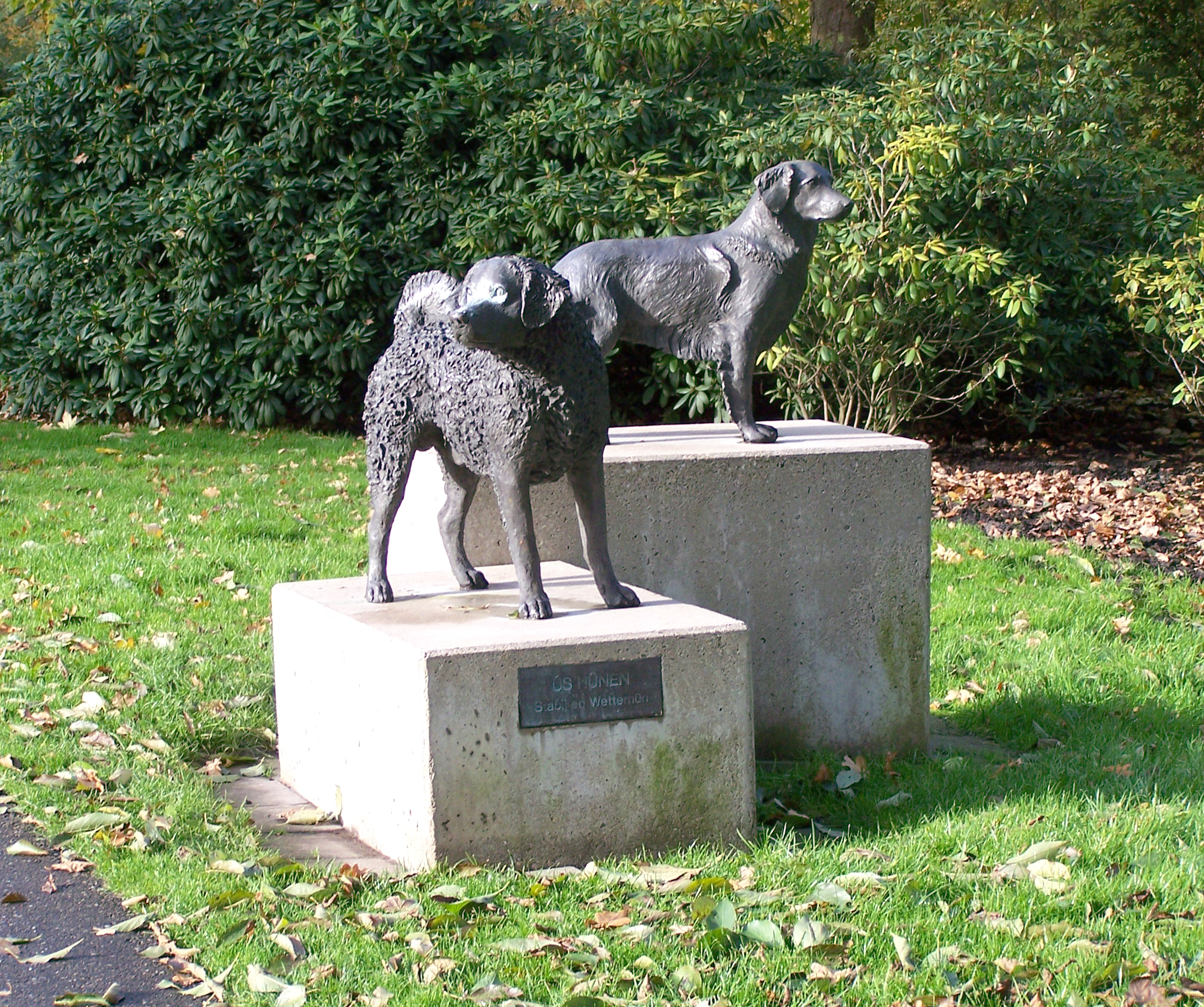
"Ús Hûnen" (Our Dogs): sculptures found in the Frisian capital's central park, depicting a Stabij in the background, with Wetterhoun in the foreground.

The Stabyhoun is mentioned in the early 19th century Frisian literature of Joost Halbertsma, Waling Dijkstra, and Nynke fan Hichtum. Historically, this breed was used for hunting foxes, small game, and birds. A fixture on Frisian farms, Stabyhouns have proven to be skillful mole-catchers. During the hunting season, it was used as an all-round gun dog. Today, the Stabyhoun remains a competent hunter, although British and German hunting breeds remain more popular. Known for its calm disposition, the Stabij is a soft-mouthed retriever, a fine pointer, excellent tracker, and a good alert dog. It has also been used by dairy farmers as a cart dog.

These dogs used to be found nearly exclusively on farms, whose owners had limited means and needed a general-purpose farm dog capable of working, hunting, and keeping watch, whilst being a faithful and reliable family companion.

The breed's appearance and purpose have not changed. In order to optimise the traits of the working farm dog in earlier days, the Stabyhoun was often mixed with another old and rare Frisian breed, the Wetterhoun, whose rugged coats and huskier physiques made Stabijs more robust.

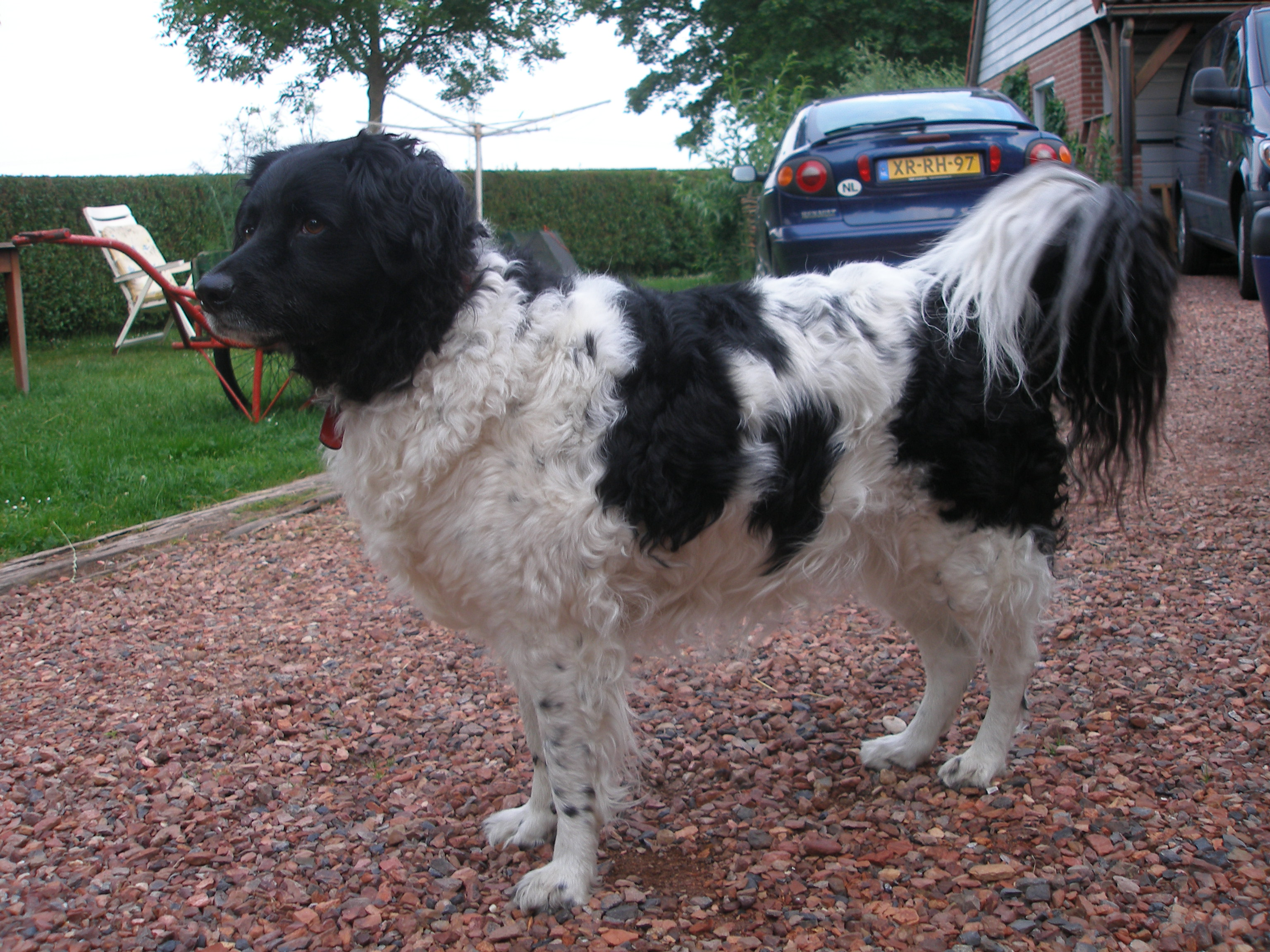
Two rare Frisian breeds mixed: a Wetterhoun/Stabyhoun

However, in 1942 the Stabyhoun received official breed recognition, and crossbreeding of the Stabyhoun and Wetterhoun ceased altogether in an effort to prevent the extinction of these increasingly rare breeds.

Today, the Stabyhoun enjoys a small but devoted following amongst Dutch sportsmen and families. Its numbers are increasing slowly but steadily. This breed has caught the attention of dog lovers in the United Kingdom, Scandinavia, and North America.

=== The Working Stabyhoun ===
Historically, the Stabyhoun was an all-around working farm dog. Apart from hunting, these dogs were used to guard property and to catch pests such as rats, moles, and polecats. This versatility is still evident in the breed today. Due to the Stabij being a canine jack-of-all-trades, it has not attracted the attention of hobbyists looking to pursue a certain sport or activity.

The Stabyhoun is both a soft-mouthed retriever and pointer with a strong tracking abilities. It works very well in water, not shying away from frigid rivers or lakes, and is easily controlled over greater distances. It retrieves any game alive and undamaged. Despite its more modest build, it is a powerful and sturdy dog, with larger Stabyhouns historically used to pull dog-carts when need arose.

The Stabyhoun is now used in almost all types of dog trials and activities: dog agility, obedience, hunting, triathlon, endurance, and frisbee, amongst others.

== Description ==
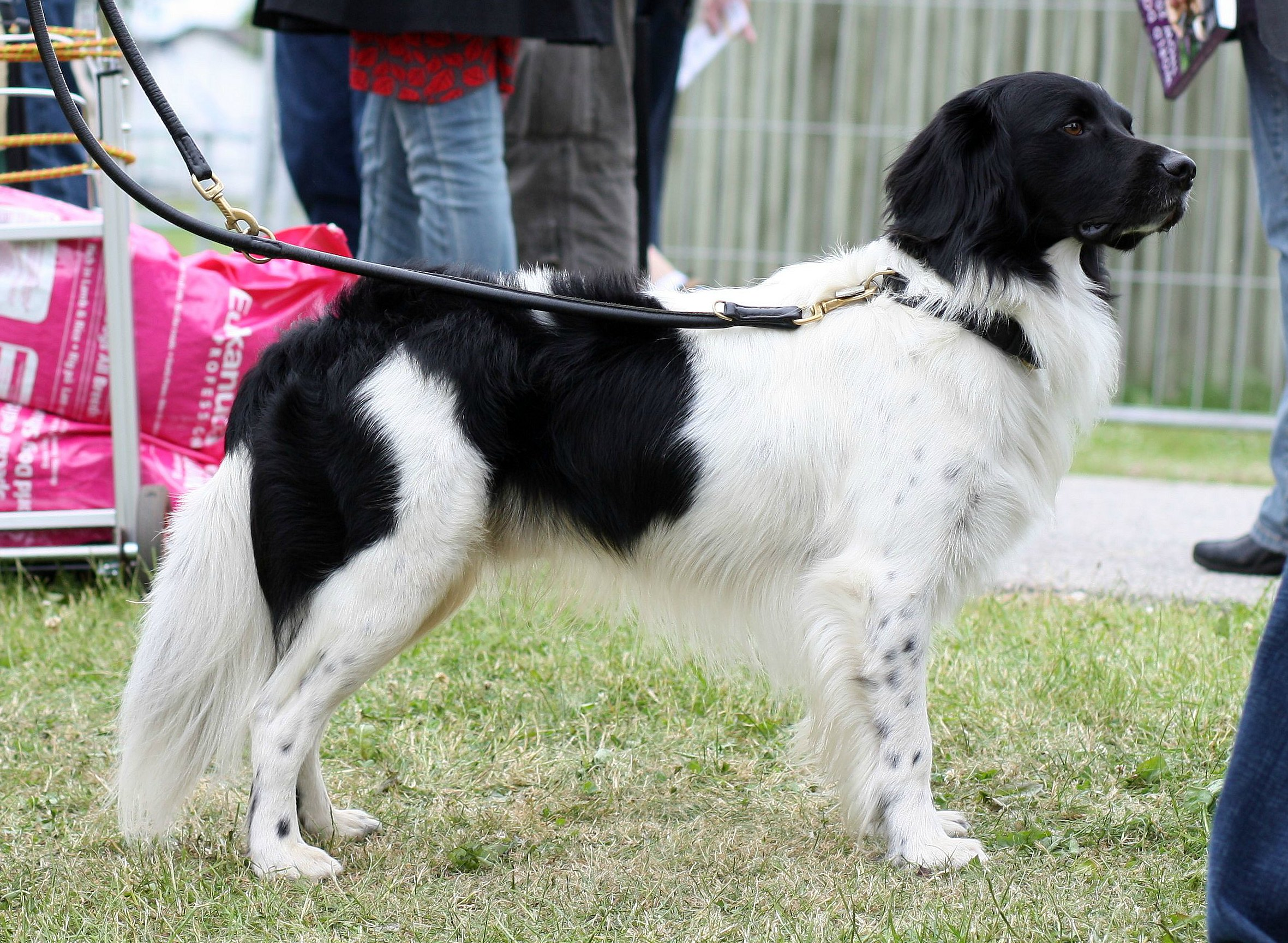
An adult Stabyhoun

=== Temperament ===
The Stabyhoun is known for its gentle disposition. This breed is friendly, sensitive, intelligent, calm, patient, and biddable but may be stubborn on occasion. The Stabyhoun is extremely tolerant of children and other animals. With steady yet gentle training, this breed will be obedient and devoted to its guardian. Stabyhouns should never be vicious or snappy.

Although a Stabyhoun can be very calm indoors, like all sporting breeds, it enjoys plenty of physical activity. Given their Frisian roots, Stabyhouns relish the opportunity to swim.

=== Appearance ===
Sturdily built with a soft silky coat, the Stabyhoun is greater in length than height. It should be of good physical scale and balance and neither muscular nor slender in build. Feminine and masculine facial features are distinct such that sex is easily distinguished.

==== Coat ====
Most Stabyhouns have a black and white coat and typically have a solid black head and white tipped tail. Brown and white Stabyhouns are less common but may be found in the Netherlands, whilst orange and white coated Stabyhouns have become increasingly rare.

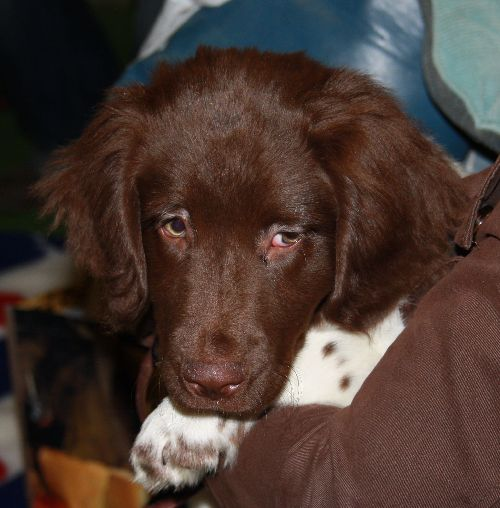
A rare brown and white Stabij puppy

Ticking and/or roaning in the white portions of the coat are acceptable, but tricolour is considered a fault. Males are 53 cm (21 in) and females are 50 cm (20 in) at the withers. The ideal weight of a Stabyhoun is 45 lb (20 kg) for a female and 50–55 lb (23–25 kg) for a male.

==== Head and Face ====
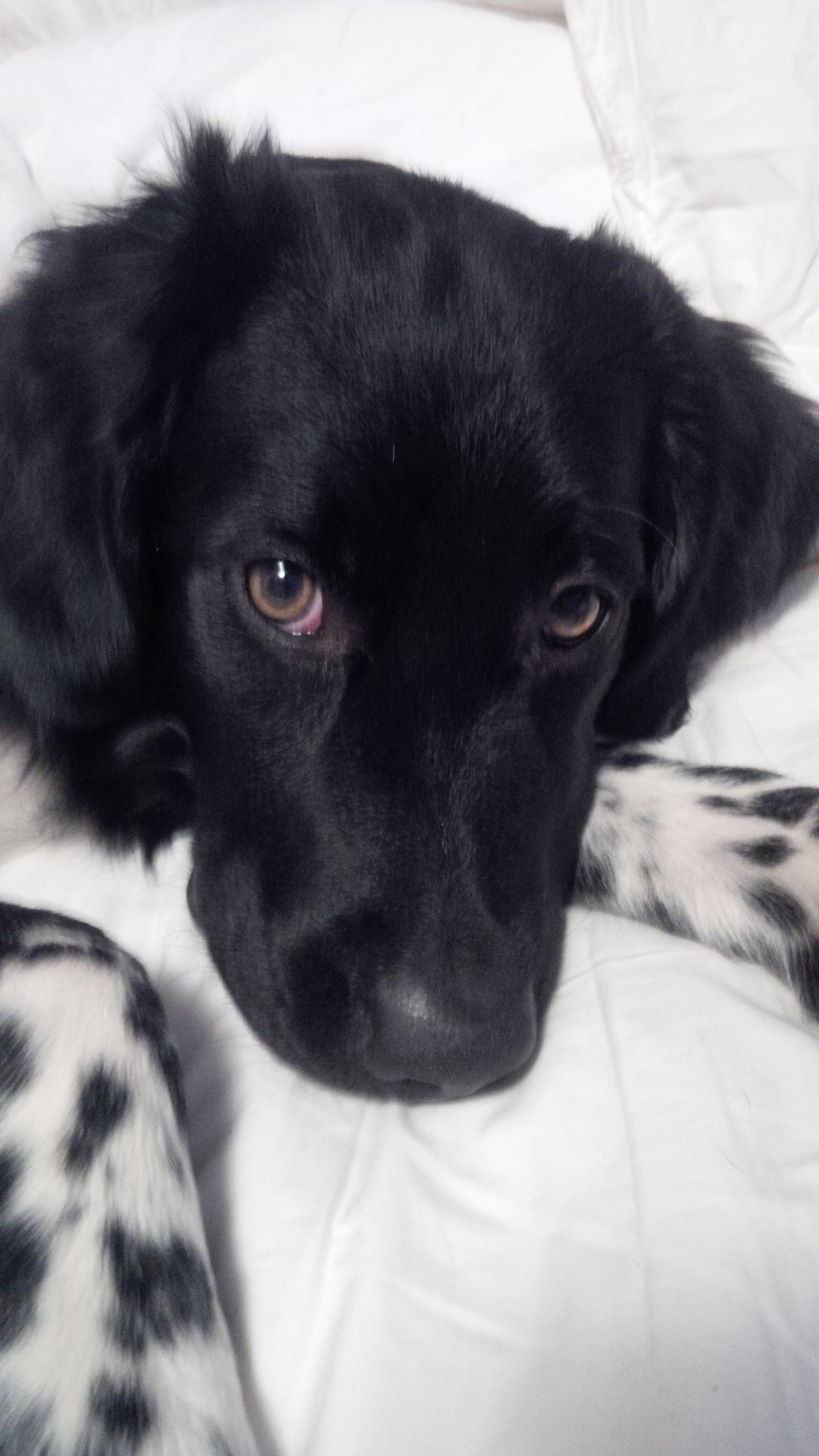
An adolescent Stabij

The head should show more length than width, with the skull and foreface equally long. The hair on the head is short. The skull should be slightly domed—but not narrow—and may never give the impression of being wide. The head is carried low on a strong, slightly arched neck. The stop is only slightly indicated. The foreface is powerful, tapering gently towards the nose without giving the appearance of a point. The bridge is straight, and the muzzle is broad; the nose is well-developed and has wide nostrils. Lips are tight and cover the teeth, which are strong and have a scissor bite. The neck should be free of throatiness or dewlap. The expression of the face should always be gentle and intelligent.

The ears are set fairly low, medium in size, and strongly developed. The ears project from the head and are moderately long and shaped like a mason's trowel. Feathering on the ears is typical, with hair growing longer at the base of the ear and steadily decreasing in length. The bottom third of the ear is covered with short hair.

The eyes should lie level in the head and be of medium size with tight rounded lids. There should not be the appearance of haw or a third eyelid. Dogs with black and white coats should have dark brown eyes, while brown and white Stabyhouns may have brown- or orange-coloured eyes. Bird-of-prey eyes are considered a fault.

==== Body ====
The Stabyhoun's coat is long and sleek. Although a slight wave over the croup is permissible, it should never be curly. The hair behind a Stabyhoun's front and rear quarters is longer and fuller but should never feather. Any curling of the coat suggests that cross-breeding has occurred in a dog's line and, for this reason, cannot be considered a purebred Stabyhoun.

A Stabyhoun's body should be powerful with well-rounded ribs. Its back is straight, with the croup sloping slightly. The loin is powerful, and the belly is only moderately tucked up. The tail is long, reaching to the hock. It is set low and carried downwards with a gentle bend upwards toward the tip of the tail. In action, the tail is lifted but never so as to curl. Like the hair behind a Stabyhoun's front and rear quarters, the tail hair should be long, full, and bushy. However, the tail hair should not feather.

The shoulder is well laid against the chest, the blades laid back and angulated. The lower forequarters should be powerful and straight, likewise the forelegs. A Stabyhoun's pasterns should be strong. The hindquarters are powerful and well angulated with a low placed hock. The feet should be round and rather big, with toes that are well developed and arched. A Stabyhoun should have thick pads.

== Health ==
A relatively healthy breed with no common health issues at present, the Stabyhoun has an average life span of 13-15 years. Diet, exercise, care, and environment are the factors that most impact the breed's health and lifespan.

Known congenital health conditions in the breed are patent ductus arteriosus (PDA), epilepsy, elbow dysplasia, hip dysplasia, and Type 1 Von Willebrands Disease (vWB). Other conditions recorded are radius curvus, hereditary cataracts, steroid responsive meningitis-arteritis (SRMA), and non-specific cancer. The heritability of these conditions is unknown, but with careful breeding, most of these problems have been eliminated. Epilepsy used to be more prevalent but is no longer as common.

=== Grooming ===
The Stabyhoun does not require special care apart from regular brushing to minimise tangling. The dogs moult (shed) twice a year, and thorough brushing helps the process of shedding. Without brushing, Stabyhoun hair can get tangled and matted in the manner of dreadlocks. The fine hair behind the ears is particularly prone to tangling and matting. Washing with harsh soaps and shampoos should be avoided whenever possible because they strip the coat of its natural oils and shine. The Stabyhoun coat will naturally rid itself of dirt and mud. After a swim, the dog is usually clean and dry in a matter of hours.

=== Breeding ===
Due to the limited size of the Stabyhoun population, careful breeding is essential. The Dutch Association for Stabyhouns and Wetterhouns (Nederlandse Vereniging voor Stabij- en Wetterhounen/NVSW), the Ameri-Can Stabyhoun Association, and the UK Stabyhoun Association have breed advisors who research and approve pairings. In an effort to control inbreeding, the association keeps breeding to a minimum and carefully considers prospective matches. Despite there being modest Stabij populations outside of the Netherlands, the breeding population is small, and the greatest genetic diversity remains in the Netherlands. Since Stabyhouns represent Dutch–in particular, Frisian–culture and heritage, breeders keep puppy and dog prices affordable; Stabyhoun breeders are commonly hobby breeders as a result.

Bitches may deliver no more than five litters in their lifetime. They may be bred only between the age of 18 months and nine years and be rested at least one year between litters. The average Stabyhoun litter size is seven. The hips of prospective mating pairs must be x-rayed (not below a FCI-C result), and the match between bitch and stud has to be approved by the Dutch Club's breeding committee. A stud must be 18 months of age or older to breed, and it must have with the same show and hip results as its female mate. Stud dogs are not to sire more than three litters a year or more than ten in their lifetime. Stud owners are expected to attend breeders' days so that the dogs may be evaluated and paired with potential mates.

== See also ==
- List of dog breeds
- Friesian cattle
- Friesian horse
