= Field dog =

Field dog can refer to any kind of gun dog used to work a field, or more specifically:

- Pointing dog, a dog used to point out game in a field
- Flushing dog, a gun dog used to scare game out of hiding.
