= Golden Retriever =

Scottish breed of dog

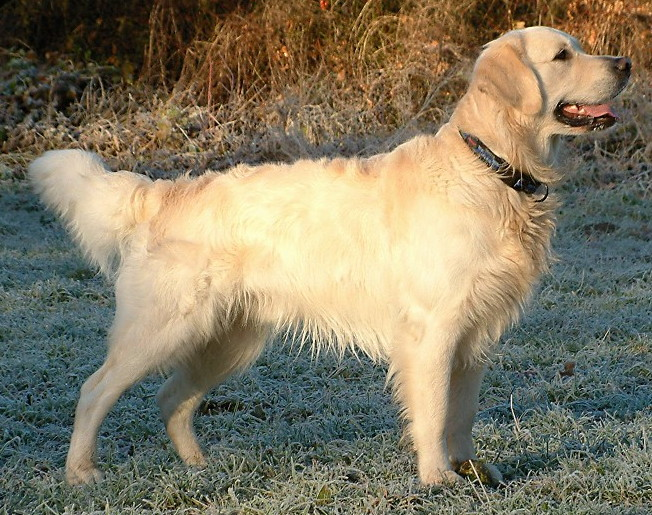
- Other names: Flat-coated Retriever, Golden; Yellow or Golden Retriever
- Origin: Great Britain
- Foundation stock: Flat-coated Retriever; Tweed Water Spaniel; Red Setter; Bloodhound; Labrador Retriever
Traits
Height	Males	56–61 cm (22–24 in)
	Females	51–56 cm (20–22 in)
- Weight: 25–34 kg (55–75 lb)
- Coat: Flat or wavy double coat with good feathering, dense water-resistant undercoat
- Colour: Any shade of gold or cream
- Litter size: 7.2±2.7
Kennel club standards
- The Kennel Club: standard
- Fédération Cynologique Internationale: standard

The Golden Retriever is a British breed of retriever dog of medium-large size. It is characterised by a gentle and affectionate nature and a striking golden coat. It is a working dog, and registration is subject to successful completion of a working trial. It is commonly kept as a companion dog and is among the most frequently registered breeds in several Western countries; some may compete in dog shows or obedience trials, or work as guide dogs.

The Golden Retriever was bred by Sir Dudley Marjoribanks at his Scottish estate Guisachan in the late nineteenth century. He cross-bred Flat-coated Retrievers with Tweed Water Spaniels, with some further infusions of Red Setter, Labrador Retriever and Bloodhound. It was recognised by the Kennel Club in 1913, and during the interwar period spread to many parts of the world.

== History ==
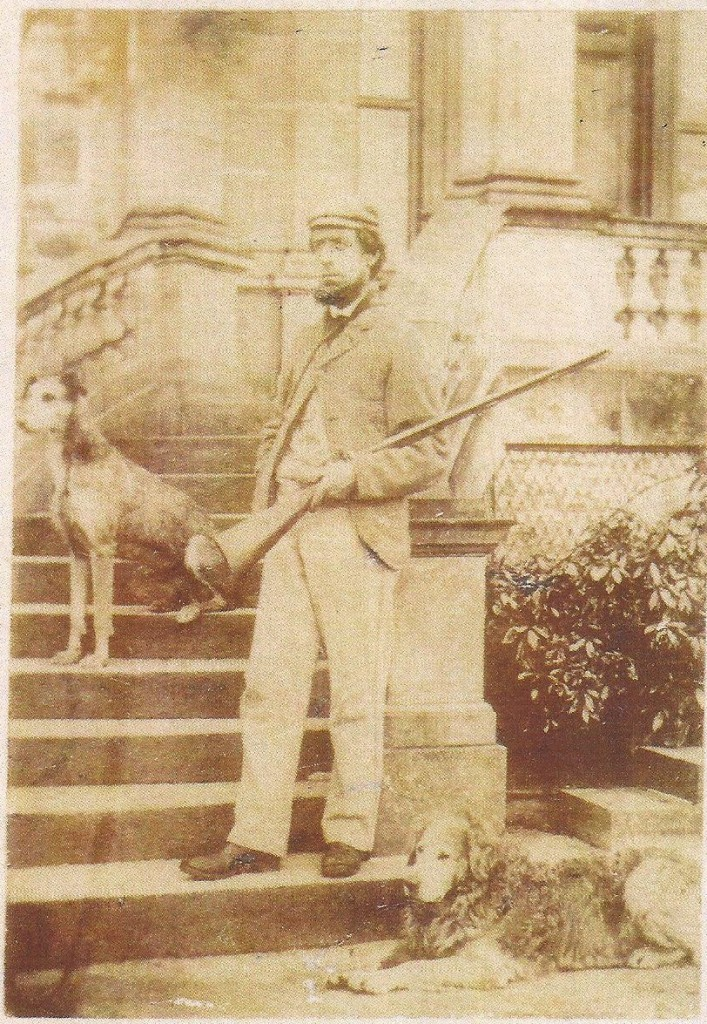
Nous, sitting, at Guisachan, 1870s

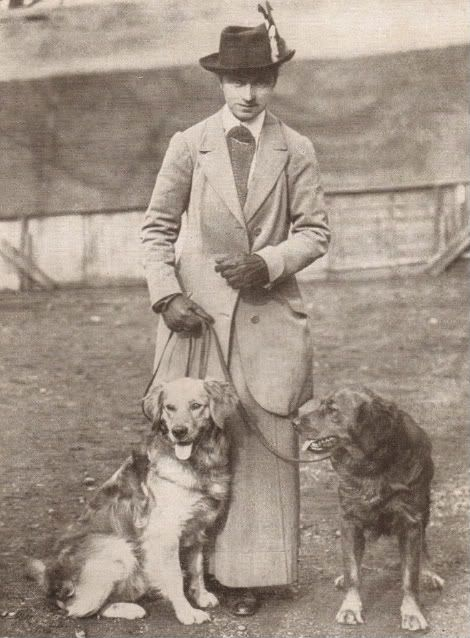
Winifred Charlesworth with two of her Golden Retrievers, 1910s

The Golden Retriever was developed in Scotland in the nineteenth century by Sir Dudley Marjoribanks (later to become Baron Tweedmouth) from Flat-coated Retrievers judiciously crossed with Tweed Water Spaniels and some other British dog breeds. Before the 1952 publication of the detailed stud book, meticulously maintained by Marjoribanks, a number of romantic tales about the breed's origins were published.

In the 1860s, Marjoribanks set out to create what, to his mind, was the ultimate breed of retriever at Guisachan, his Scottish estate. He started by acquiring a yellow-coloured Flat-coated Retriever dog named Nous; (Note: Accounts vary as to whether Sir Dudley Marjoribanks acquired Nous in 1865 or 1868.) Nous had been whelped in June 1864 and was the only yellow pup in an otherwise all black-coloured litter. Although uncommon, occasionally liver-, brown-, golden- or yellow-coloured purebred Flat-coated Retriever pups are whelped to matings of two black parents. It was Nous's pedigree that gave rise to the romantic tales of the Golden Retriever's heritage. One early account claimed Nous was purchased from a Russian circus trainer in Brighton; another claimed he was bought from a cobbler; and yet another claimed he was bought from a gypsy. The stud book states that Nous was a Flat-coated Retriever bred by Henry Pelham, 3rd Earl of Chichester on his Stanmer Park estate near Brighton.

In 1868, Nous was mated to a Tweed Water Spaniel female named Belle, who is recorded in the stud book as being whelped in 1863 and being of "Ladykirk breeding". The litter from this mating consisted of four yellow pups: Primrose, Ada, Cowslip, and Crocus. The female selected from this litter, Cowslip, was mated to a Tweed Water Spaniel called Tweed with the mating producing a bitch pup called Topsy. Cowslip was subsequently mated to a Red Setter called Sampson; that mating produced a dog pup called Jack. Topsy was mated with a black Flat-coated Retriever called Sambo and a bitch pup from that litter, Zoe, was mated back to Jack and two pups from that mating were retained, a dog called Nous II and a bitch called Gill. Gill was mated to a black Labrador Retriever called Tracer, and a bitch pup from that mating, Queenie, was mated back to Nous II; all Golden Retrievers descend from this mating. The progeny from these various matings varied in colour from pure black to light cream, but it was the golden-coloured ones that were retained and mated to each other, forming the foundation stock of the Golden Retriever breed. Marjoribanks is also known to have used a sandy-coloured Bloodhound and another Labrador in subsequent years of the breeding programme.

Sir Dudley Marjoribanks's early breeding programme

Nous ♂ FCR	Belle ♀ TWS
Sampson ♂ RS	Cowslip ♀	Tweed ♂ TWS
Topsy ♀	Sambo ♂ FCR
Jack ♂	Zoe ♀
Gill ♀	Tracer ♂ Lab
Nous II ♂	Queenie ♀

- FCR = Flat-coated Retriever
- TWS = Tweed Water Spaniel
- RS = Red Setter
- Lab = Labrador Retriever

In 1952, Marjoribanks's great-nephew, Giles Fox-Strangways, 6th Earl of Ilchester, teamed up with Elma Stonex, and together they studied Marjoribanks's stud book. In 1960, their research was published, presenting all of the evidence required to counter all tales of Russian ancestry. The stud book, which covers the period from 1868 to 1890, is preserved in the library of the Kennel Club in London. In the early days, Golden Retrievers were called the "Flat-coated Retriever, Golden". (Note: In the 19th century, the Flat-coated Retriever was frequently called the Wavey-coated Retriever, and accordingly the Golden Retriever was often called the 'Wavy-coated Retriever, Golden'.) Initially, the Golden Retriever was considered a colour variety of the former breed. In 1903, the Kennel Club recorded the first examples, listing them in the same register as Flat-coats. In 1904 a Golden Retriever won a field trial and in 1908 the first examples were exhibited at conformation shows. In 1911, a breed club for the breed in England, the Golden Retriever Club, was formed, and the breed was given a new name, the "Yellow or Golden Retriever". From this point, they were increasingly seen as a separate breed from the Flat-coated Retriever. It was not until 1913 that the Kennel Club began recording them on a separate breed register from the Flat-coated Retriever, and in 1920, the "Yellow or" was dropped from the breed name, and they were officially called the "Golden Retriever".

One early twentieth-century enthusiast of the breed, Winifred Charlesworth, was instrumental in establishing the breed club and in securing its separate Kennel Club recognition. It was she who drew up the first breed standard, which was adopted by the Kennel Club and, with only minor amendments, remains essentially unchanged. She bred and exhibited the first Golden Retriever Show Champion, was a strong advocate for maintaining the working instincts of the breed, and is credited with popularising it at field trials and introducing it to shooting sportsmen. (Note: Charlesworth was still exhibiting and running her dogs in field trials after the Second World War, and was very outspoken in her views that Golden Retrievers should not be shown without also competing in field trials, calling any handler who did so a "show-bench lounger".)

In the years after the First World War, its popularity increased markedly, and in the 1920s and 1930s it spread through much of the Western world. The Canadian Kennel Club recognised the breed in 1927, and the American Kennel Club in 1932. The first examples were registered in France in 1934 and in Australia in 1937. The worldwide popularity of the breed meant it did not suffer the misfortunes many British dog breeds did during the Second World War due to British wartime restrictions on the breeding of larger dogs, with ample quality breeding stock available globally to ensure none of its characteristics were lost. Since the 1940s, its popularity has continued to grow, and it has become one of the most recognised and most frequently registered dog breeds in the Western world.

== Description ==
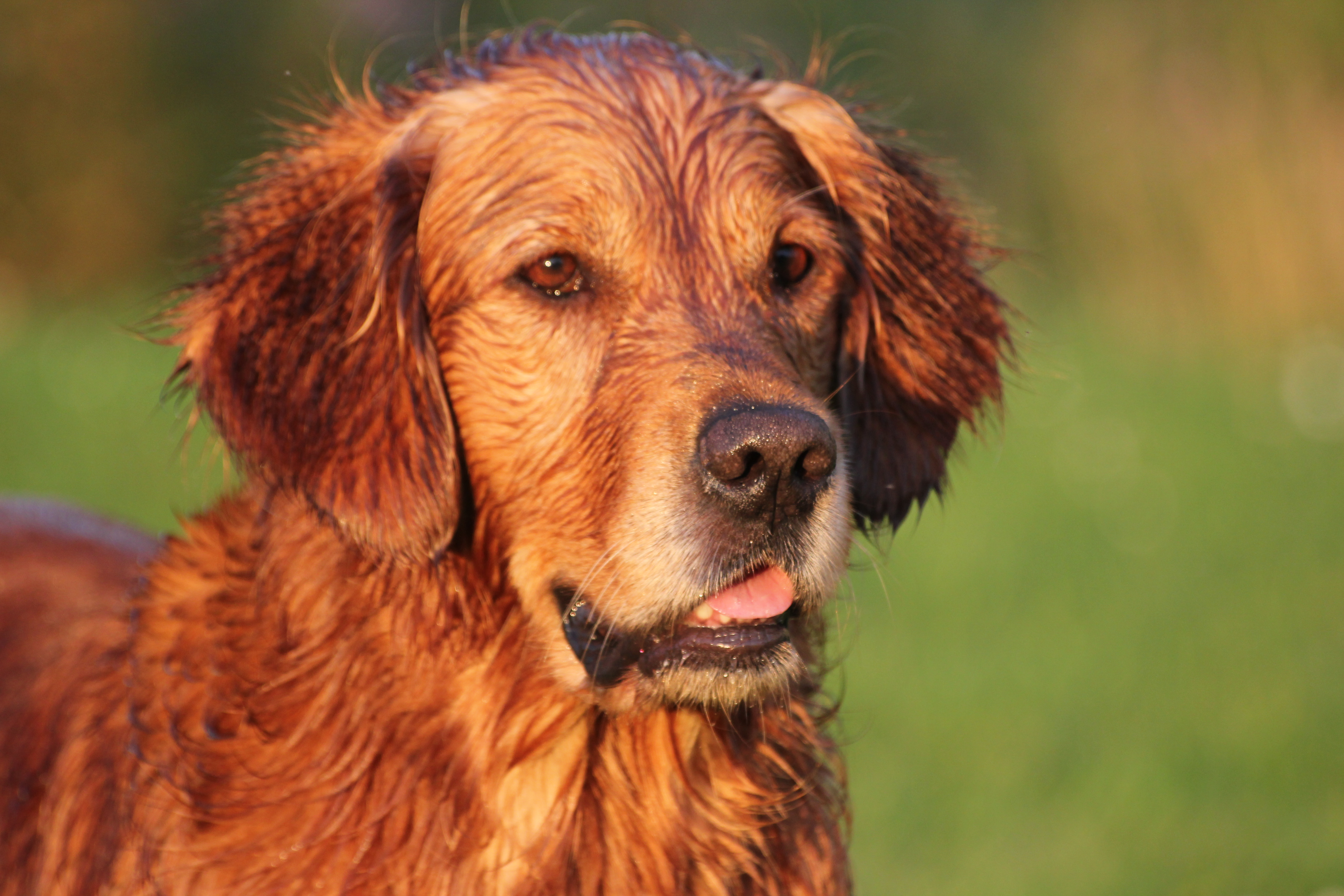
Facial features

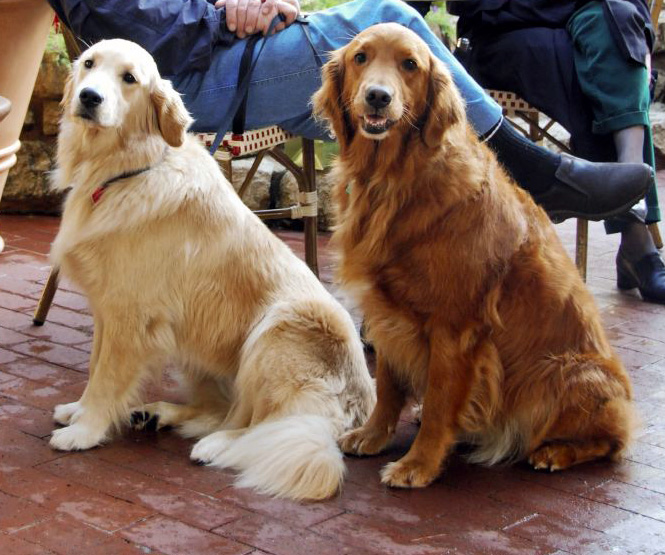
Differences in coat colours

=== Appearance ===
The Golden Retriever is a powerfully built, medium-sized breed of dog; according to the Kennel Club breed standard, dogs stand from 56 to 61 centimetres (22 to 24 in) and bitches from 51 to 56 centimetres (20 to 22 in). Healthy adult examples typically weigh between 25 and 34 kilograms (55 and 75 lb).

The Golden Retriever has a broad head with a well-defined stop, dark eyes set well apart, a wide and powerful muzzle, a large black nose, dark-pigmented and slightly drooping flews, and ears of moderate size set high and hanging with a slight fold. The neck is muscular and fairly long with loose-fitting skin, the shoulders well laid-back and long-bladed, and the body deep through the chest with well-sprung ribs. The back is usually level from withers to croup, and the long, straight tail is usually carried flat, roughly in line with the back. The forelegs are straight with good bone, the hind legs are powerful with well-bent stifles and muscular thighs, and the feet are cat-like.

The double coat is a recognisable and striking feature: the outer coat is long, flat, or wavy, with good feathering on the forelegs, while the undercoat is dense and provides weather resistance. The coat can be any shade of cream, yellow, or gold; it typically becomes paler with age. The Kennel Club breed standard prohibits red or mahogany-coloured coats, but a few white hairs on the chest are permitted. Originally, only yellow or golden coloured examples were permitted; this excluded many outstanding cream coloured dogs. To overcome this, in 1936, the Kennel Club amended its standard to include the cream colour. The cream colour, which in more modern times can be almost white, has become the dominant colour and is particularly favoured by conformation show exhibitors. Golden Retrievers that are bred for conformation shows tend to have longer and finer coats than those bred for working as gundogs.

The Kennel Club breed standard is accepted by every kennel club worldwide except those in Canada and the United States. Breed standards in North America call for a slightly taller dog (Note: The American Kennel Club specifies that dogs should stand from 23 to 24 inches (58 to 61 cm) and bitches from 21 1/2 to 22 1/2 inches (55 to 57 cm).) and the cream colour is not permitted.

=== Temperament ===
The Golden Retriever is considered an intelligent, gentle-natured, and very affectionate breed. As is typical with retriever breeds, the breed is generally calm and biddable, being very easy to train and extremely keen to please their humans. The breed is known to make excellent pets and family dogs, being generally extremely tolerant of children and keen to accompany any family member in a range of activities. Due to their affable natures, the breed is often completely devoid of guarding instincts. However, there have also been reports of some very aggressive Golden Retrievers in certain lineages. It has been suggested that genetic factors partially cause these variations in aggression.

The breed usually retains many of its gundog traits and instincts, including an excellent sense of smell and a strong instinct to retrieve; even among those not trained as gundogs, it is typical for Golden Retrievers to present their owners with toys or other objects. Compared to other retriever breeds, the Golden Retriever is typically quite slow to mature.

== Health ==
A 2024 UK study found a median life expectancy (95% CI) of 13.2 (13.1–13.2) years for the breed compared to an average of 12.7 for purebreeds and 12 for crossbreeds. A 2024 Italian study found a life expectancy of 10 years for the breed compared to 10 years overall. A 2005 Swedish study found that 22% of Golden Retrievers died by the age of 10, less than the overall rate of 35% of dogs dying by the age of 10.

The breed is unusually prone to cancer, with one United States study finding cancer to be the cause of death in approximately 50% of the population, the second highest in the study. Several European studies found a much lower prevalence (20–39%), which may reflect the significant genetic divergence between the American and European populations. They are especially prone to haemangiosarcoma and lymphoma, with an estimated lifetime risk of one in five for the former and one in eight for the latter. The breed is also the subject of the Golden Retriever Lifetime Study, a long-term prospective research project conducted by the Morris Animal Foundation to investigate cancer and other diseases in dogs.

The high prevalence of cancer deaths among Golden Retrievers may partly represent a lack of other congenital diseases. One UK study found the odds (95% CI) of metastatic neoplasia in the breed to be 4.86 (2.48–9.50) times greater than the odds of metastatic neoplasia in a large control population of dogs with Petlog microchips in the country.

The Golden Retriever has a genetic predisposition to primary hypothyroidism; a 2015 review of 5 studies found that Golden Retrievers accounted for 17% of cases.

Nonepidermolytic ichthyosis is caused by an autosomal recessive trait in the Golden Retriever. A mutation in the PNPLA1 gene is responsible.

== Use ==
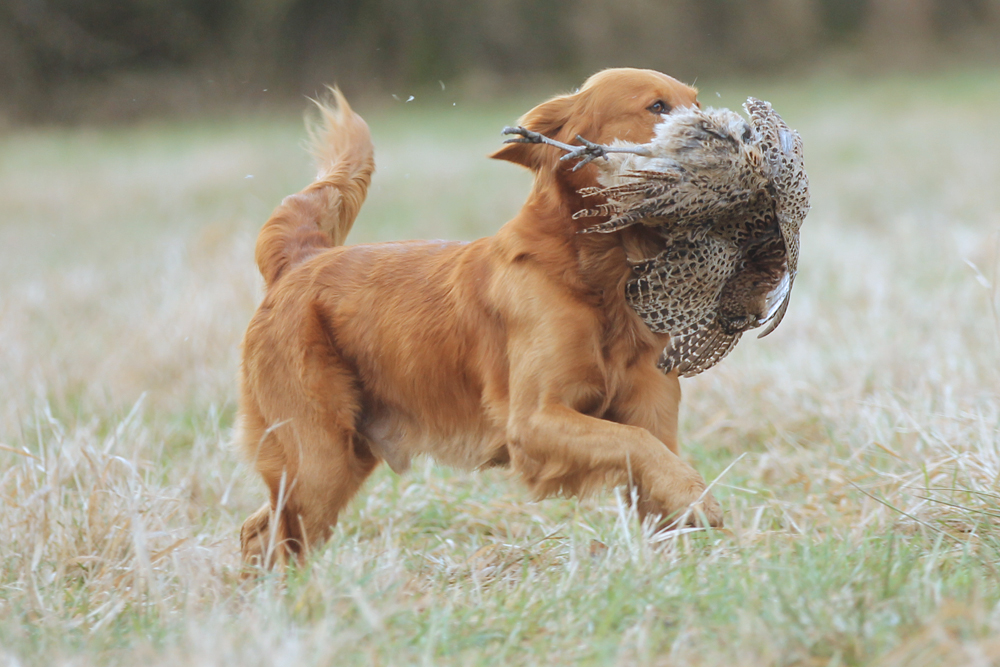
Retrieving a shot gamebird

The Golden Retriever is one of the most commonly kept breeds of companion dog in the Western world, and is often among the top ten dog breeds by number of registrations in the United Kingdom, the United States, Australia and Canada. It is a frequent competitor at dog shows; separate show lines of the breed have been developed. The dogs can be trained as guide dogs and therapy dogs, and may compete in obedience trials and other dog sports.

The Golden Retriever is still used as a gundog by sportsmen, both as a hunting companion in the field and for competing in field trials. It is used more for retrieval of land-based gamebirds such as grouse and partridge than for wildfowl hunting. Those used as gundogs are usually from working lines specifically bred for field use; dogs from pet or show lines are rarely suitable. A Golden Retriever with a traditional dense double coat is well suited to working in cold and wet conditions, as the coat provides water resistance and insulation. Compared to other retriever breeds, the Golden Retriever is not a strong swimmer; its long coat causes it to sit low in the water when swimming.

The Golden Retriever is much less commonly used by sportsmen as a hunting companion than the Labrador Retriever. One reason is that the breed is generally quite slow to mature, particularly compared to the Labrador; often when a Golden Retriever is still in basic training a Labrador of the same age has already completed a season of hunting. Another is its long coat, which requires more maintenance and grooming than that of the Labrador, particularly after working in muddy conditions or close cover, as their long hair is more prone to picking up dirt and burrs. More Golden Retrievers are bred as pets or for the show ring than for hunting, so it can be hard for sportsmen to find pups bred from proven working lines.

== Notable Golden Retrievers ==
- Liberty, presidential pet of President Gerald R. Ford
- Bailey, pet of 2020 US presidential candidate Elizabeth Warren
- Orca, PDSA Gold Medal recipient for bravery
- Mayor Max, elected Mayor of Idyllwild, California
- Buddy, dog actor in the film Air Bud
- Tucker Budzyn, social media influencer (2018-2026)
