= Moustache (dog) =

Dog which participated in the French Revolutionary and Napoleonic Wars

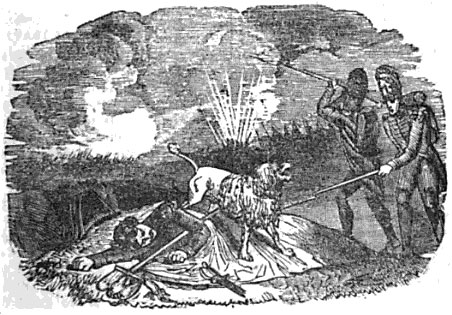
- An engraving of Moustache at the Battle of Austerlitz, from 1836
- Other names: Mous, Mustache
- Species: Canis familiaris
- Breed: Barbet
- Sex: Male
- Born: Approx. September 1799; Falaise, Normandy, France
- Died: 11 March 1812 (aged about 12); Badajoz, Spain
- Resting place: Badajoz, Spain
- Nationality: French
- Occupation: Military dog
- Employer: French Army
- Years active: 1800–1812
- Known for: Participating in several battles of the French Revolutionary and Napoleonic Wars
- Awards: Awarded a medal by Marshal Jean Lannes

Moustache, sometimes abbreviated to Mous, (September 1799 – 11 March 1812) (Note: The 1811 date given in Cano and de Fivas is presumably an error as the siege of Badajoz took place in March–April 1812 and Moustache would only be 11 years old in 1811.) was a barbet who is reputed to have played a part in the French Revolutionary and Napoleonic Wars. His story is recounted in many publications but may be partly fictionalised. Moustache is said to have been born in Falaise, Normandy, France, in 1799 and to have joined a grenadier regiment at Caen. He followed the regiment through the Italian Campaign of the Revolutionary Wars and is said to have alerted the regiment to a surprise night attack by Austrian forces. He is reported to have been present at the Battle of Marengo, during which he lost an ear, and with a cuirassier regiment at the Battle of Austerlitz.

At Austerlitz Moustache was apparently responsible for the discovery of an Austrian spy, and the recovery of the regiment's standard from the Austrians. As a result of wounds taken at Austerlitz Moustache had a leg amputated and was reportedly rewarded with a medal by Marshal Jean Lannes. He is later said to have followed a unit of dragoons to Spain where he fought in several actions of the Peninsular War. Seeing action in the Sierra Morena and later, with a gunboat unit, at the Battle of Badajoz, where he was killed by a cannonball. Moustache was interred beneath a gravestone on the battlefield but his memorial is said to have been smashed and his bones burned after the war.

== Historical sources ==
One of the earliest written accounts of Moustache's life is that written by Arna Cano and published in The Kaleidoscope magazine of Liverpool in January 1826. This, published twenty years after the dog's death, may be partially fictionalised. A similar story is recounted in a detailed French-language account written by Alain de Fivas and published in 1864. Moustache is mentioned in at least eleven English, French and German publications. (Note: These works include those listed in the references and further reading.) The story presented here is drawn largely from the Cano and de Fivas accounts and notes any disagreement with the other accounts.

== Early life ==
Moustache, a black barbet, was born in Falaise in Normandy, France in approximately September 1799. At the age of six months Cano states that he was sent to Caen to live with a grocer and whilst there encountered a group of grenadiers on parade. He goes on to say that Moustache followed behind the regiment, which had no other dogs, as it left the town and, on the approval of the drum major, was allowed to accompany the unit on campaign. The regiment was headed to Italy as part of the Italian Campaign fought by France against Austria during the French Revolutionary Wars.

Though Moustache was not a trained military dog, he apparently took to military life well, comfortably crossing the Great St Bernard Pass through the Alps with First Consul Napoleon Bonaparte's army in spring 1800. It is during this stage that one of Moustache's most famous actions is reputed to have taken place. Whilst the regiment was encamped near Belbo the Austrians are said to have mounted a surprise night attack on the camp in stormy weather conditions. It is claimed that Moustache noticed the approaching Austrian troops and barked to alert the grenadiers, who stood to, and repulsed the attack.

Other sources place this event as occurring in Alexandria, Egypt during the Egyptian campaign against the Ottoman Empire. This variant may have been inspired by Napoleon's letter to General Auguste de Marmont just prior to the 1799 Battle of Abukir when Marmont was in Alexandria. It urged Marmont to provide an attack warning system by securing "a large quantity of dogs which can be made use of by posting them in front of your fortifications". After this event, the Colonel of the grenadier regiment is said to have formally placed Moustache on the roll as a grenadier and gave him a collar bearing the regiment's name. Additionally, he ordered that Moustache receive the field rations entitled to a grenadier and that he be combed by the unit's barber once per week.

== Austrian campaigns ==
=== Battle of Marengo ===
Both Cano and de Fivas say that whilst en route to Spinetta Marengo Moustache took part in a small engagement between a company of his regiment and some Austrians. He was standing at the front of the company when he received a bayonet wound to his left shoulder. Moustache spent several days recovering in the hospital of the regimental surgeon. Though he was not fully recovered from the wound, still having a limp, Moustache is said to have taken to the field with the regiment on 14 June 1800 at the Battle of Marengo. During the battle he persistently barked at the Austrian forces and was only dissuaded from attacking them by their fixed bayonets.

Moustache did engage in close combat with one opponent - a pointer owned by an Austrian corporal that approached the French lines. De Fivas says that Moustache quickly pounced on the larger, stronger dog and fought with him for some time before a musket shot killed the pointer. Cano states that Moustache was also wounded by the shot, losing an ear. Moustache deserted the grenadiers shortly after the French victory at Marengo, apparently because one of them attempted to chain him to a sentry box, and instead joined a company of mounted cuirassiers.

=== Battle of Austerlitz ===
According to de Fivas, Moustache was responsible for the discovery of an Austrian spy in the French camp just prior to the Battle of Austerlitz. The dog is alleged to have leapt to his feet and barked at the Austrian to alert French soldiers. Some sources state that this event occurred around the time of the earlier battles of Marengo or Abukir.

Moustache's greatest achievement is said to have taken place at Austerlitz. De Fivas states that Moustache went into battle with the cuirassiers and was present when the regimental standard bearer was surrounded by Austrian soldiers. The standard bearer apparently killed three Austrians before he was himself cut down, wrapping the flag around him as he fell to prevent its capture. It is at this point that de Fivas alleges that Moustache confronted the five or six remaining Austrians and was about to be bayoneted when the group was hit by a blast of artillery grapeshot. Moustache, wounded in the leg, is reputed to have torn the flag off the body of the standard bearer and returned it to the French camp.

In recognition of this action Marshal Jean Lannes is reported to have ordered that Moustache's old collar be replaced with a copper medal on a piece of red ribbon. De Fivas states that this medal was engraved with the words "II perdit une jambe à la bataille d'Austerlitz, et sauva le drapeau de son régiment" on the front, and "Moustache, chien français : qu'il soit partout respecté et chéri comme un brave" on the reverse, which translates to "He lost a leg at the Battle of Austerlitz and saved the regimental flag" and "Moustache, A French dog: Everywhere respected and cherished as a hero" respectively. At least one other source says instead that the medal was silver and had a tricolore collar.

Moustache later had to have his wounded leg amputated. Other rewards he is said to have received for this event include an order being issued that whichever regiment he presented himself at would have to feed him the rations of a serving soldier and that he was placed on the regimental books and was to receive the pay and rations of a soldier. A further legend says that Moustache was presented to Napoleon himself and demonstrated to have performed a trick whereby he would cock his leg whenever France's enemies were mentioned.

=== Battle of Essling ===
At the Battle of Essling, Moustache was supposed to have found a mate. Upon joining the front lines, a fellow Poodle was spotted amongst the enemy. During the course of the battle, the two met and the female Poodle accompanied Moustache back to the French camp. This relationship lasted about a year and together the pair produced puppies which were looked after by the women of the camp.

== Spanish campaign ==
Moustache is said to have left the cuirassiers after he was struck by a cavalryman with the flat of his sword. De Fivas says that he attached himself to a unit of dragoons which he followed to Spain, taking part in two campaigns with them during which he would walk ahead of their column and bark warnings whenever he heard a noise. During a battle in the Sierra Morena mountain range in southern Spain Moustache is alleged to have led back to camp the horses of dragoons killed on the battlefield. Shortly after this he is said to have been secretly taken by a Colonel who wished to own him. After spending seventeen days in captivity the dog apparently escaped by an open window and joined with a gunboat crew. Afterwards he participated in the Battle of Badajoz where he was struck by a cannonball and killed on 11 March 1812, at the age of twelve years.

Moustache was reputedly buried on the battlefield alongside his medal and ribbon with a gravestone engraved with the words "Ici repose le brave Moustache" ("Here lies the brave Moustache"). Though he was wounded many times in his life it is said that all of his wounds were to his front. After the allied victory over the French in the Peninsular War, it is alleged that the Spanish destroyed his gravestone and the Inquisition ordered his bones to be dug up and burned.

== See also ==
- List of individual dogs
