= Spanish Water Dog =

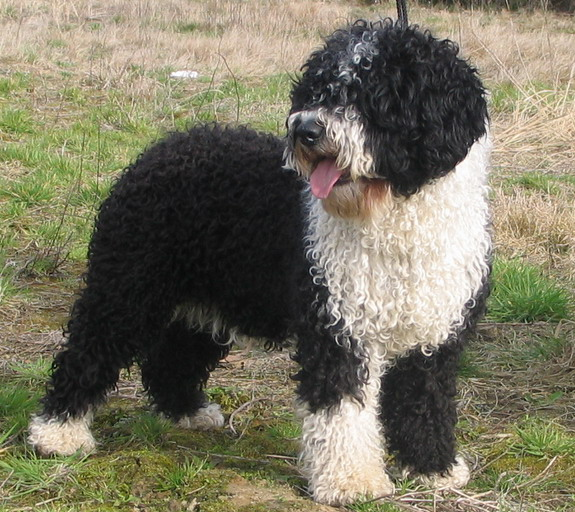

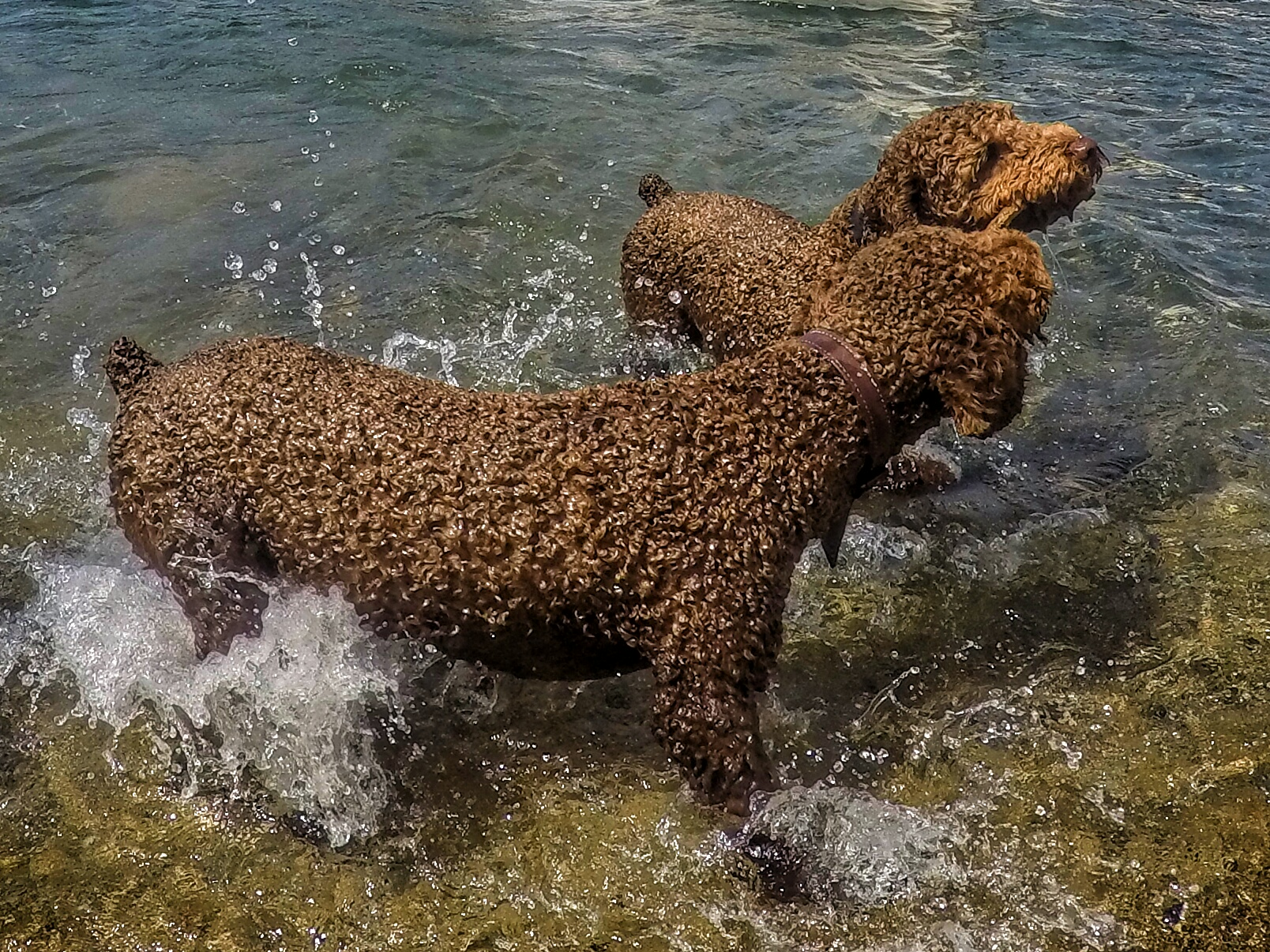
- Other names: Perro de Agua Español
- Origin: Spain
Traits
Height	Males	45–50 cm (18–20 in)
	Females	41–46 cm (16–18 in)
Weight	Males	18–22 kg (40–49 lb)
	Females	14–18 kg (31–40 lb)
Kennel club standards
- Real Sociedad Canina de España: standard
- Fédération Cynologique Internationale: standard

The Spanish Water Dog or Perro de Agua Español is a Spanish breed of water dog. It was traditionally used for a variety of tasks: as a herding dog for sheep or cattle; as a gundog to find and retrieve game in marshlands; and as an aid to inshore fishermen on the Cantabrian coast. In the twenty-first century it is kept principally as a companion dog.

Three sub-populations of the breed were identified in the late twentieth century: the Marismeño ('marsh dog') of the Marismas del Guadalquivir at the mouth of the river of the same name; the Serrano ('sierra dog') of southern Andalucia; and the Norteño ('northern dog') of Cantabria and Asturias. This last was recognised in Spanish law in 2012 as a separate breed, the Cantabrian Water Dog.

== History ==
The Perro de Agua is a traditional dog population of Spain. It was always a minority breed, present in smaller numbers than some other Spanish dogs. The population is thought to have remained fairly stable until the 1970s and 1980s, when – as a consequence of changes to methods of both agriculture and fishery – numbers fell sharply, to the point that the dogs were considered to be at risk of extinction. Until this time there had been no scientific study of the breed; in the 1980s a study of the dogs in the province of Malaga was carried out, and further work was done by researchers at the Universidad de Córdoba in the 1990s.

Three sub-populations of the breed were identified, on the basis both of observed differences in physical size and of differences in the distribution of coat colours; the characteristics of the head were found to be similar in all of the dogs. The sub-groups were: the Marismeño ('marsh dog') of the Marismas del Guadalquivir, at the mouth of the river of the same name in western Andalucia; the Serrano ('sierra dog') of southern Andalucia; and the smaller Norteño ('northern dog') of Cantabria and Asturias.

The Perro de Agua Español was recognised by the Real Sociedad Canina de España, the Spanish kennel club, in 1975; it was definitively accepted by the Fédération Cynologique Internationale in 1999; and was recognised in Spanish law by Royal Decree in 2001. The Norteño sub-population of Cantabria and Asturias was recognised in Spanish law in 2012 as a separate breed, the Cantabrian Water Dog.

== Characteristics ==
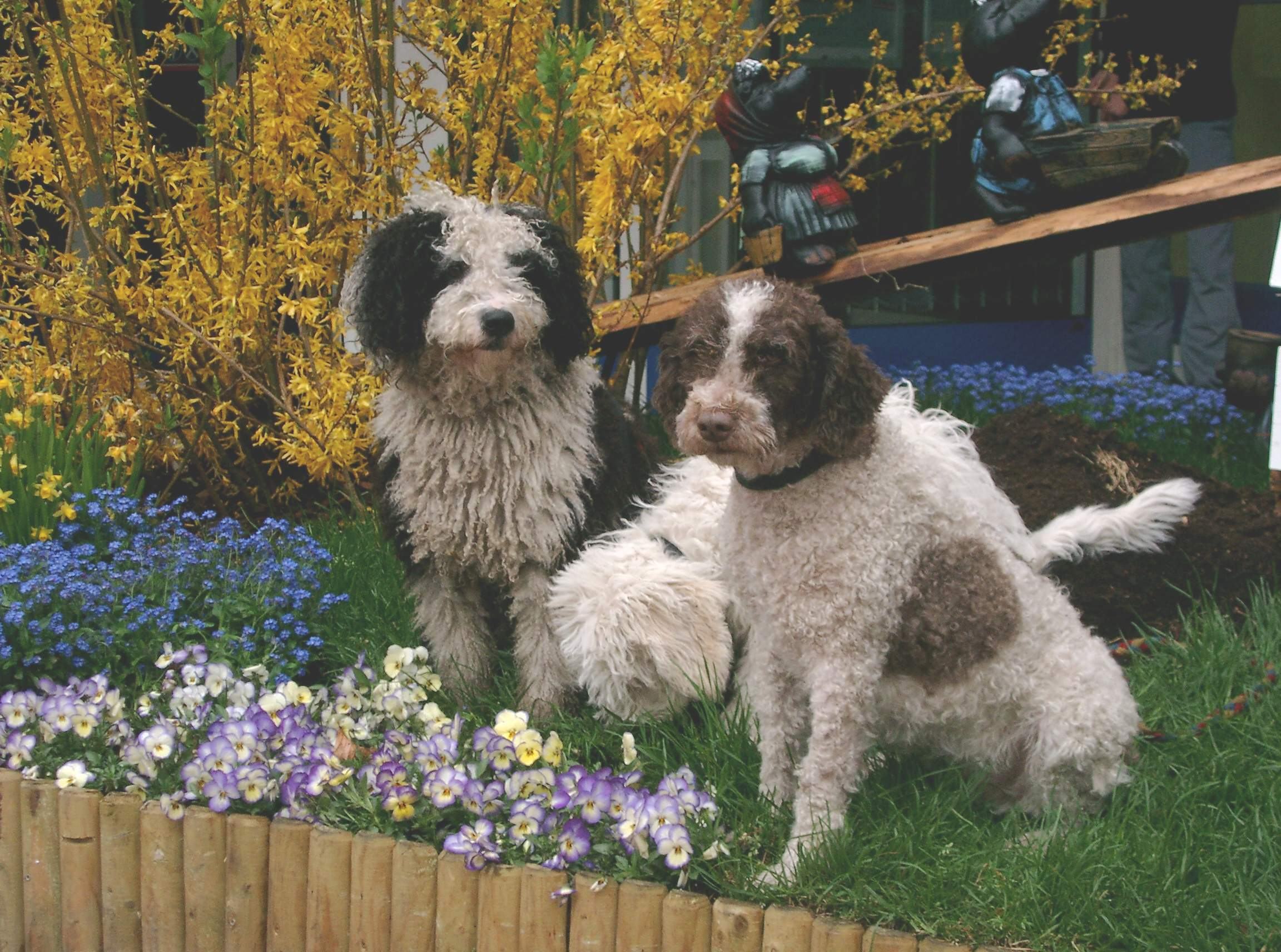
Black and white, solid white, brown and white

The Perro de Agua is a medium-sized, athletic, robust dog that is slightly longer than tall. Approximately half are born with natural bobbed (short) tails.

The head is strong and carried with elegance. The skull is flat and the top is parallel with the top of the muzzle. The nose, eye-rims and paw pads are the same colour as the darkest part of the coat or darker. The eyes are set fairly wide apart, and are hazel, chestnut or dark brown in colour, depending on the coat colour. The ears are set at medium height on the skull, and are triangular.

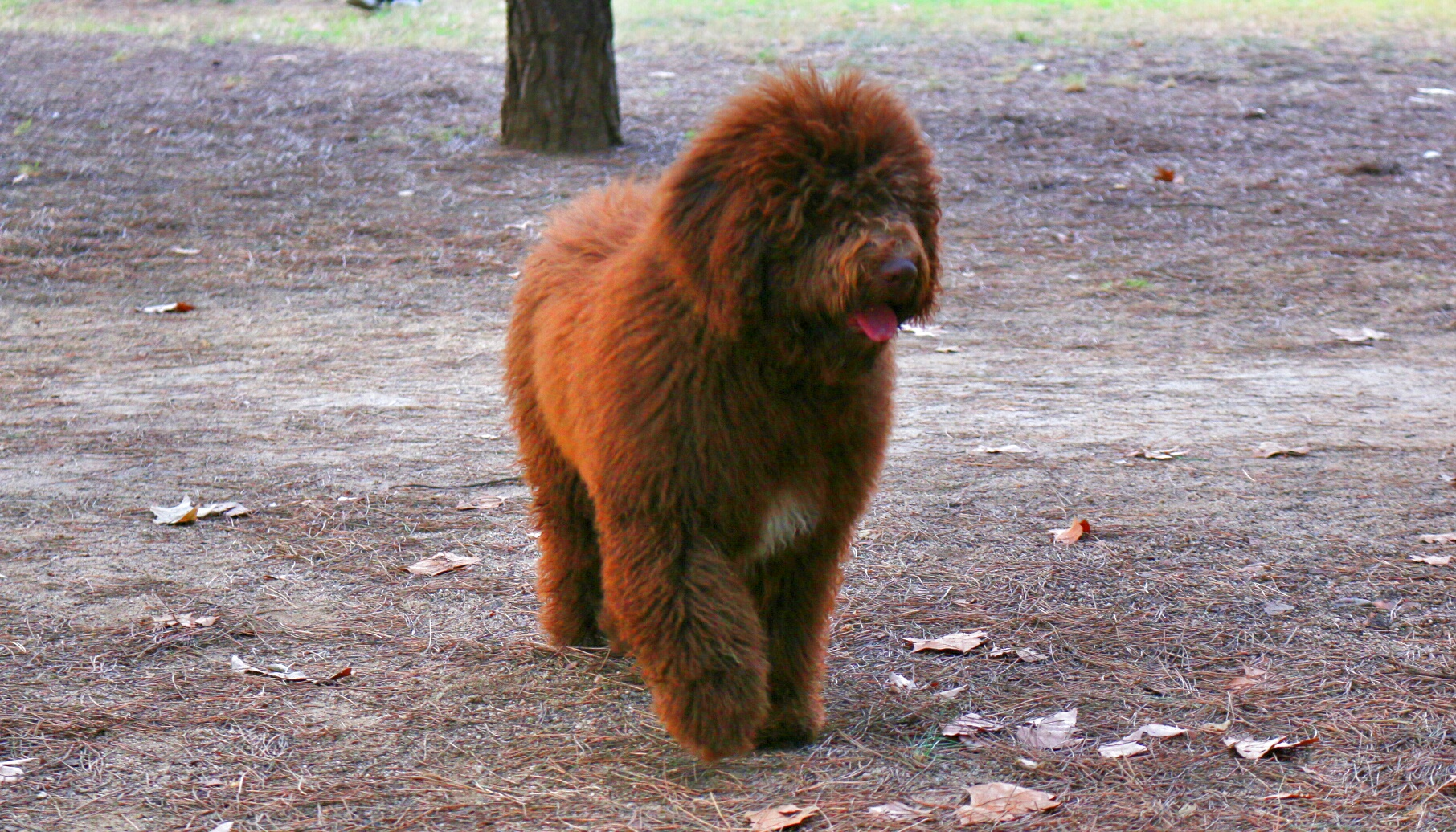
Solid brown

It has a distinctive curly coat which is woolly in texture and may form cords when long.

It may be solid black, beige, brown, or white; bicolour where the second colour is white; or particolour. Tri-coloured dogs are strictly prohibited by the international standards for the breed, as are black-and-tan or brown-and-tan colour combinations.

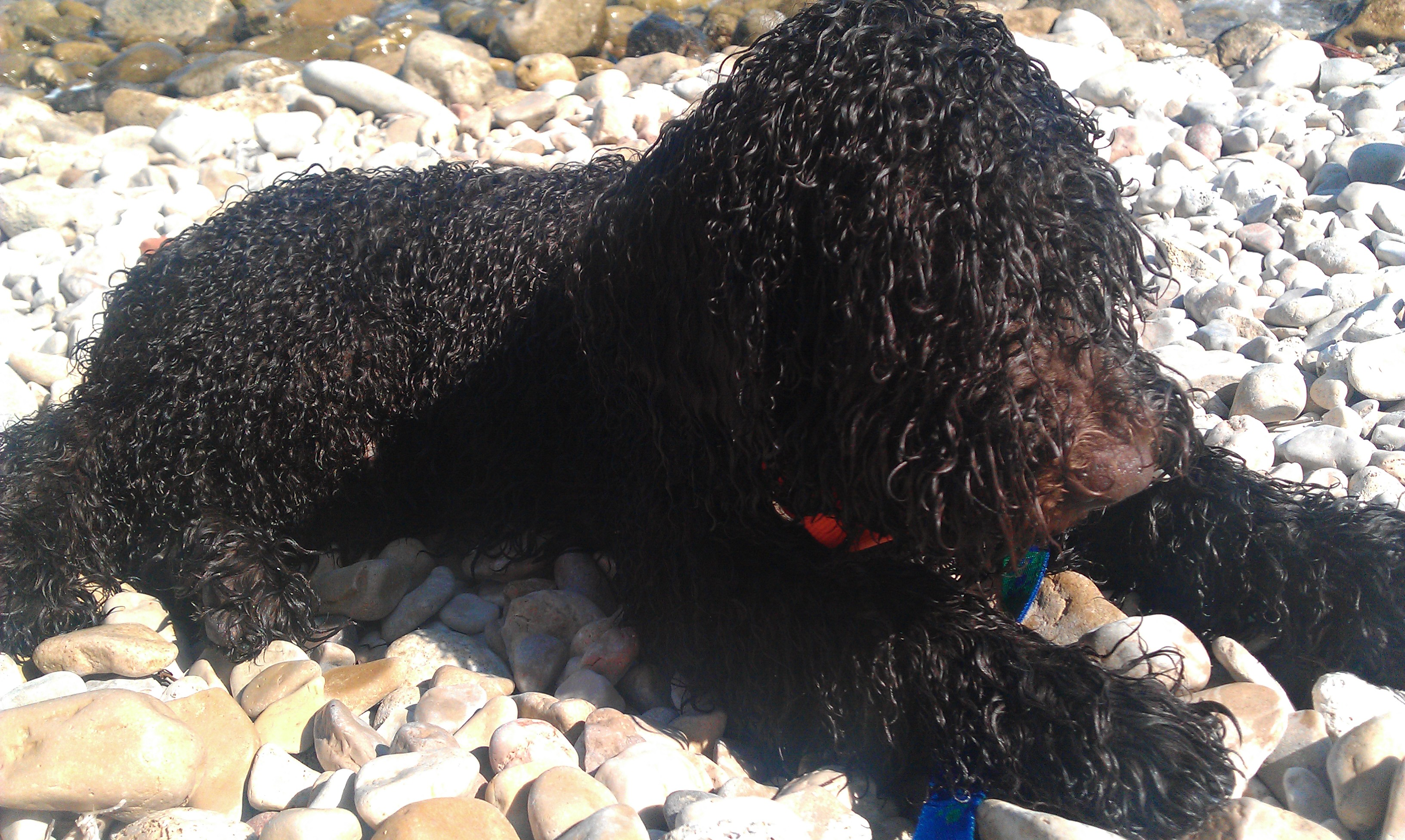
Solid black

It is a medium-sized dog. The approximate measurements are:

- Males
  - Height (at the withers): 44–50 cm (17–20 in)
  - Weight: 18–22 kg (40–49 lb)
- Females
  - Height (at the withers): 40–45 cm (16–18 in)
  - Weight: 14–18 kg (31–40 lb)

== Health ==
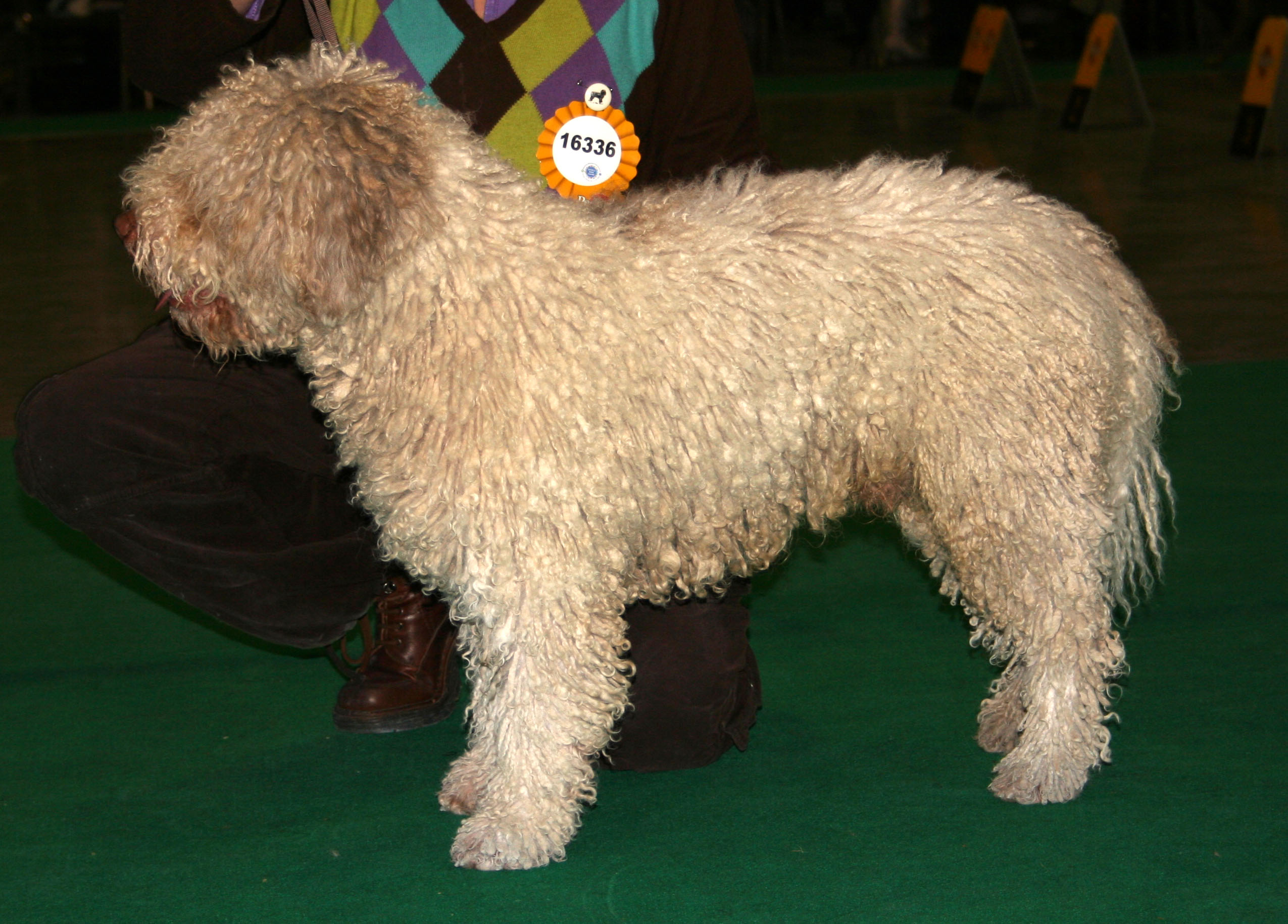
Spanish Water Dog

The life expectancy is thought to be about 14 years. Recent health testing has uncovered the following issues:

- Hip dysplasia
- Progressive retinal atrophy (prcd-PRA)
- Hypothyroidism
- Hypoadrenocorticism (also known as Addison's disease)
- Exocrine pancreatic insufficiency
- Allergies
- Cataracts
- Congenital hypothyroidism with goitre (CHG)
- Distichia
- Cherry eye
- Neuroaxonal dystrophy
