= Water dog =

Dog type

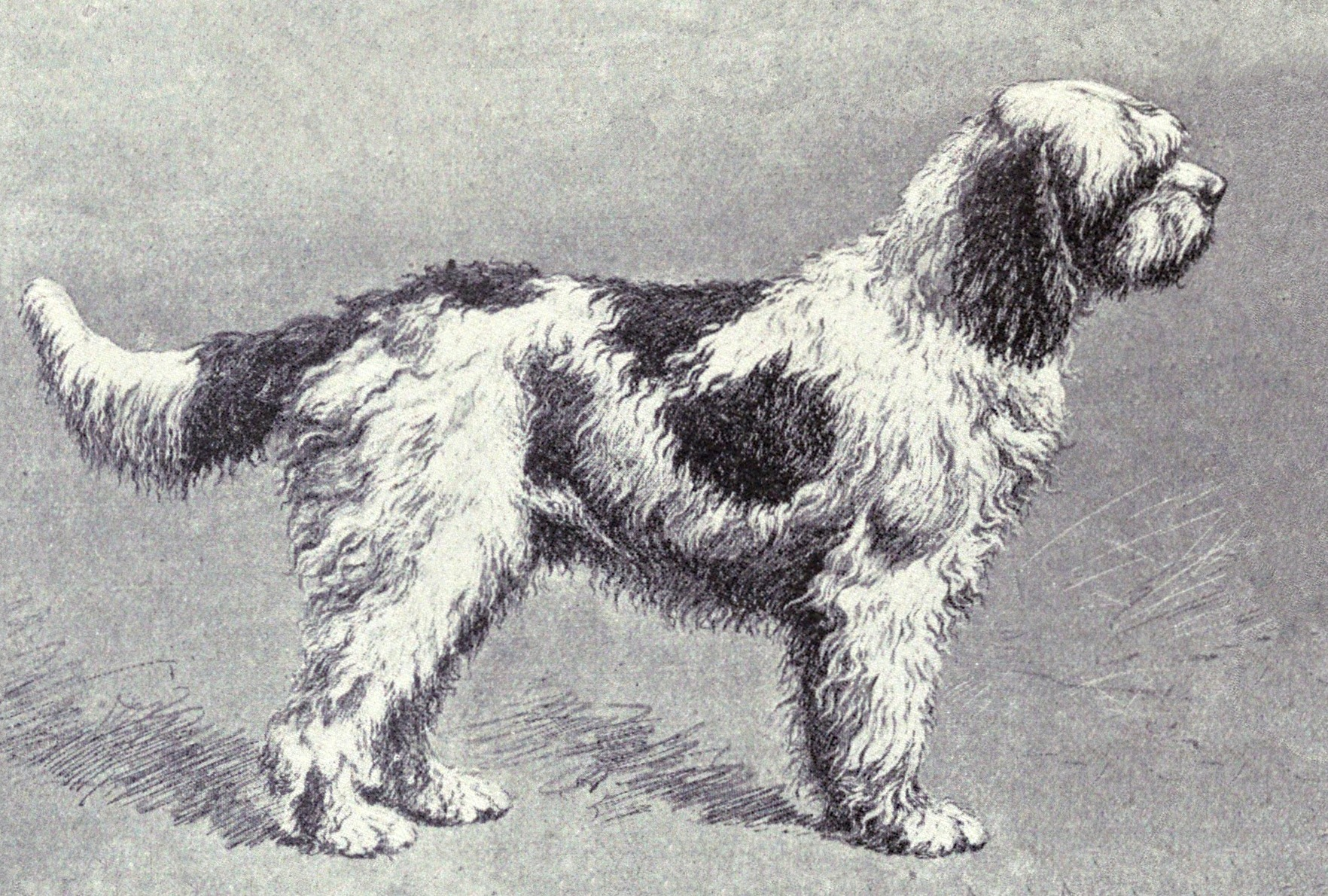
The Barbet, one of the oldest breeds of water dogs.

A water dog is a type of gundog bred to flush and retrieve game from water. Water dogs are considered the progenitors of most modern retriever dog breeds.

== Description ==
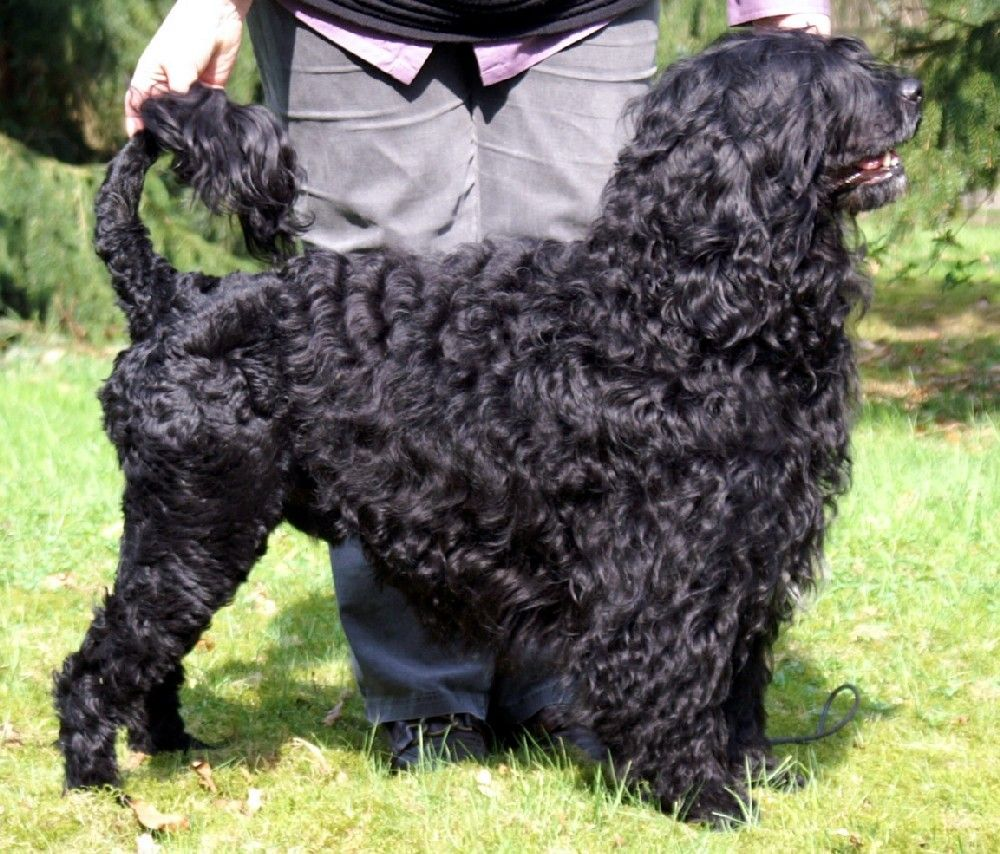
A Portuguese Water Dog with its coat clipped in the classic water dog clip.

Water dogs are usually medium-sized, active dogs; their most distinctive feature are their tight waterproof coats and their strong desire to swim. Traditionally many long haired water dogs breeds have their coats clipped with a bare midriff and hindquarters to assist in swimming by reducing drag, whilst retaining a long coat around their torso to prevent thermal shock when jumping into freezing water. This classic clip is seen to this day in dog shows with some breeds such as Poodles retaining a variation of this clip. Paintings by artists like Francisco Goya and Albrecht Durer in the 15th century depict early Standard Poodles, which were used for retrieving game birds from water.

== History ==
Water dogs are an ancient type of dog, used by ancient mariners to retrieve objects lost overboard as well as to pass messages between boats, they were known to the Romans who called them "lion dogs" after the distinctive clipping of their coats. Water dogs continued to be seen aboard ships until modern times. They were known to be prevalent in the Spanish Armada and could still be seen through to the 20th century aboard fishing vessels, particularly in the waters around Spain and Portugal.

In addition to their roles as ships' dogs, in Medieval Europe water dogs were used quite widely by hunters to retrieve ducks from water that had been shot with a bow and arrows, as well as the arrows and bolts that had missed their mark.

With the invention of modern firearms the need for dogs to retrieve arrows disappeared and many of the European water dogs breeds became predominantly ornamental, such as the poodle, whilst others adapted into modern gundogs, like the Wetterhoun. It is believed that water dogs were used, along with other types, in the breeding of most modern retriever breeds.

== List of breeds ==
This is a list of dog breeds usually considered water dogs.

| Breed | Alternate name(s) | Country of origin | Image |
|---|---|---|---|
| American Water Spaniel | American Brown Spaniel & American Brown Water Spaniel | United States | |
| Barbet | French Water Dog | France | |
| Cantabrian Water Dog | Perro de agua cantábrico, Perro de lanas & Merlucero | Spain | |
| English Water Spaniel † | Water Dog & Water Rug | England | |
| Irish Water Spaniel | Whiptail, Shannon Spaniel, Rat Tail Spaniel & Bog Dog | Ireland | |
| Lagotto Romagnolo | Romagna Water Dog & Water Dog of Romagna | Italy | |
| Poodle | Pudelhund & Caniche | France, Germany | |
| Portuguese Water Dog | Cão de Água Português & Cão de Água Algarvio | Portugal | |
| Pudelpointer ‡ | | Germany | |
| Spanish Water Dog | Perro de agua Español | Spain | |
| Tweed Water Spaniel † | Tweed Spaniel & Ladykirk Spaniel | England | |
| Wetterhoun | Otterhoun & Dutch Spaniel | Netherlands | |

† Extinct breed
‡ Often considered a versatile gundog
