= Barbet (dog breed) =

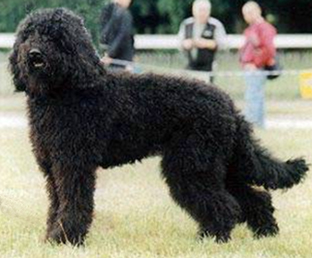
- Other names: French water dog
- Origin: France
Traits
Height	Males	58–65 cm (23–26 in)
	Females	53–61 cm (21–24 in)
- Coat: thick, long, wooly, wavy, curly
- Colour: Solid black, grey, brown, fawn, pale fawn, white or pied
Kennel club standards
- Société Centrale Canine: standard
- Fédération Cynologique Internationale: standard

The Barbet is a medium-sized breed of French water dog. It is a rare breed. The breed's name comes from the French word barbe, meaning 'beard'.

== Description ==
=== Appearance ===
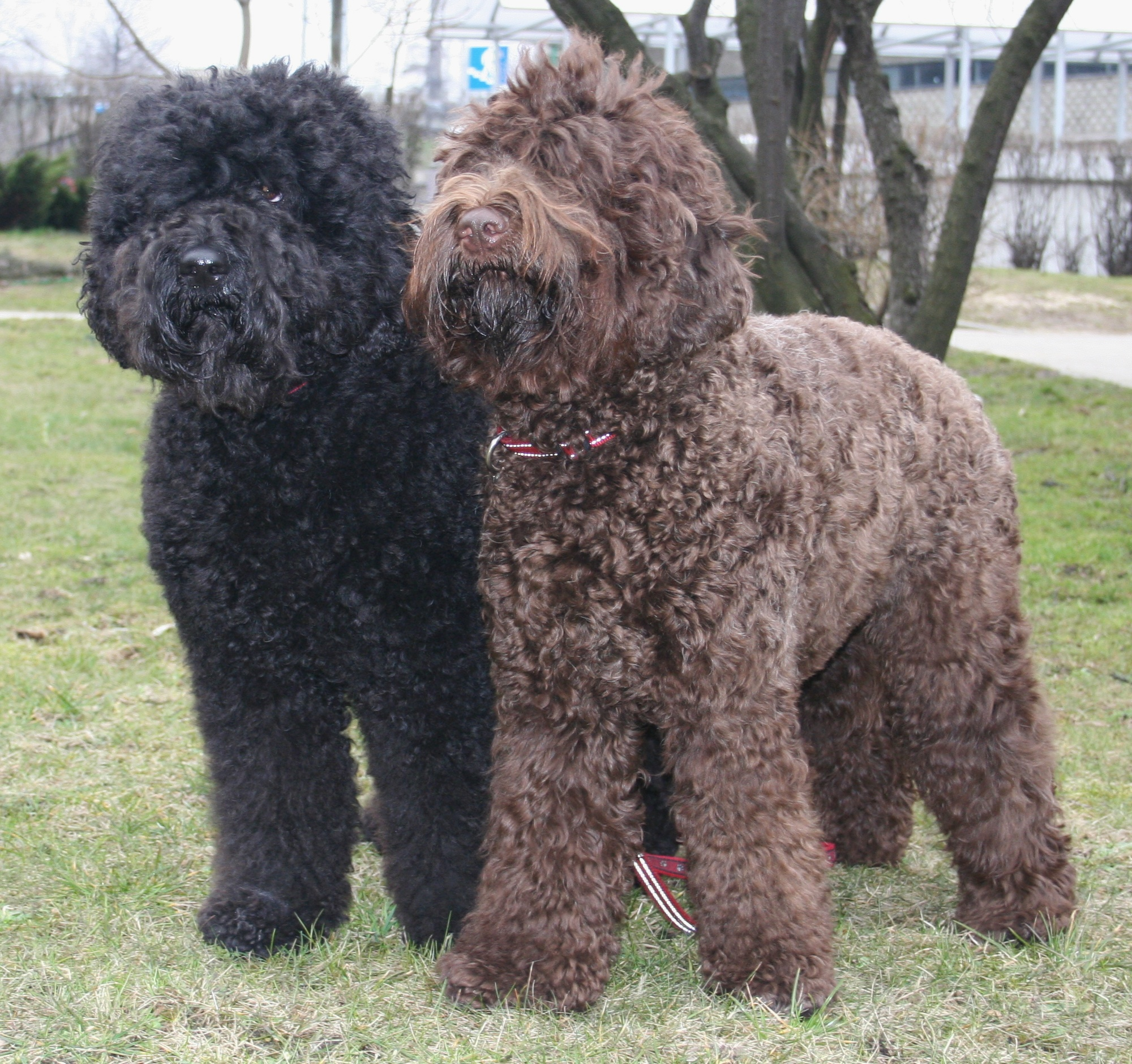
Two female barbets

The barbet is a prototypic water dog, with a long, woolly, and curly coat. Their coats grow continuously and must be trimmed and groomed regularly, otherwise the coat can become matted.

Most Barbets, especially those shown in conformation shows, are black or brown, sometimes with white markings. Other rare colors include fawn, grey, pari, creme, and pied.

Male Barbets are usually 21 to 25 in (53 to 64 cm) tall and between 40 and 60 lb (18 and 27 kg), while females usually reach 20 to 23 in (51 to 58 cm) and 30 to 50 lb (14 to 23 kg).

=== Temperament ===
The Barbet is described as friendly, obedient, and intelligent. Due to their history as water dogs, many Barbet love swimming and playing in water.

They are capable retrievers for waterfowl hunting. In France, the barbet can take the test d'aptitudes naturelles (TAN), a basic water-retrieving test, and has recently been permitted to participate in the brevet de chasse a l'eau (BCE), a general hunting-dog test involving field and water trials. In Germany, the barbet takes part in field trials.

== Health ==
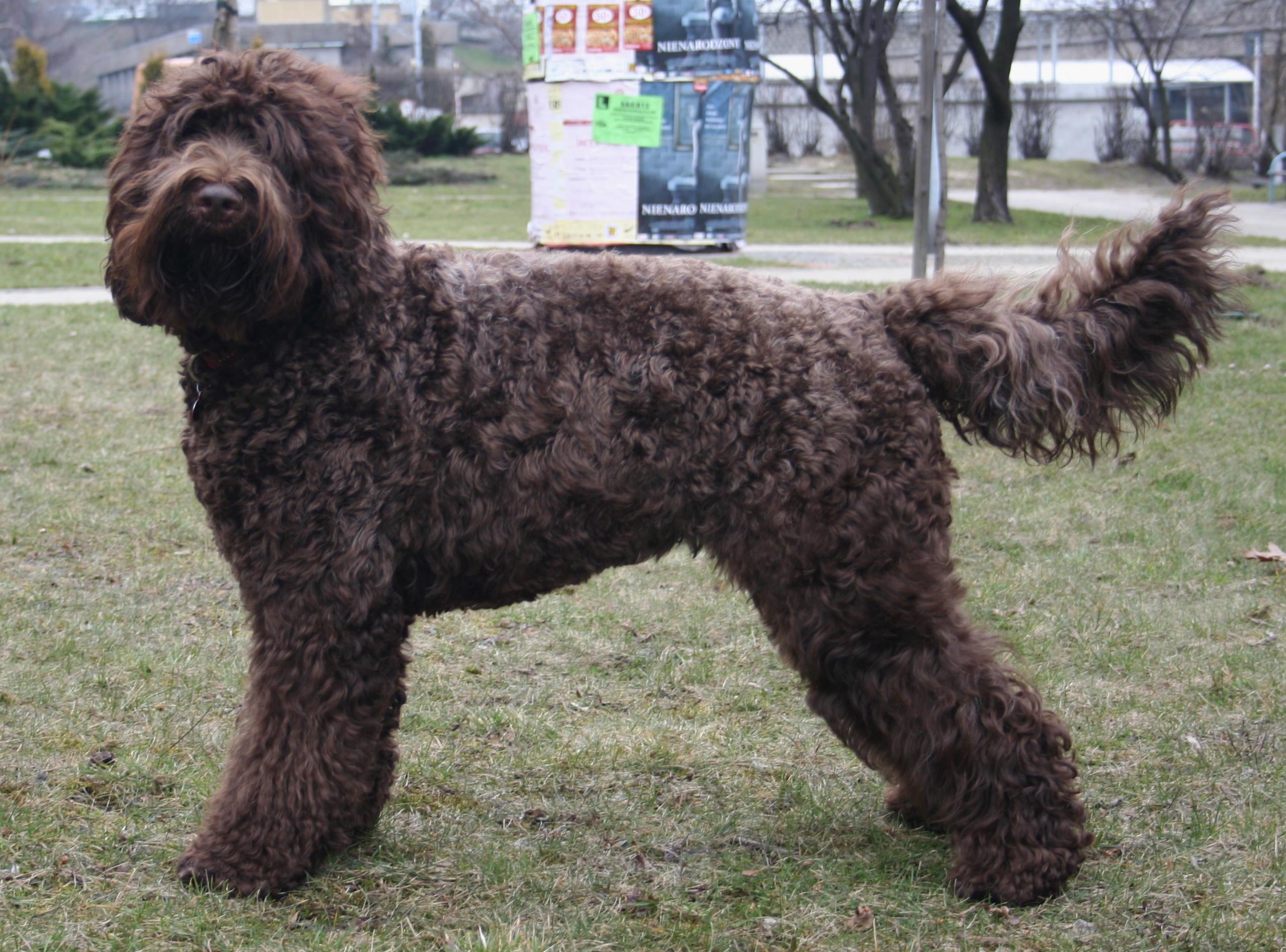

Barbets are a relatively healthy breed with a life expectancy of 13 to 15 years. Due to the rarity of the breed, there is limited data on breed-specific concerns. They can have hip dysplasia, epilepsy, and like most long-eared dogs are prone to ear infections.

The Barbet is a rare breed, which limits the genetic variety available. A 2006 study found a coefficient of inbreeding of 12.4%, significantly higher than the eight other French breeds examined in the study, while a 2013 study found a coefficient of 9.1%, likewise very high.

== History ==
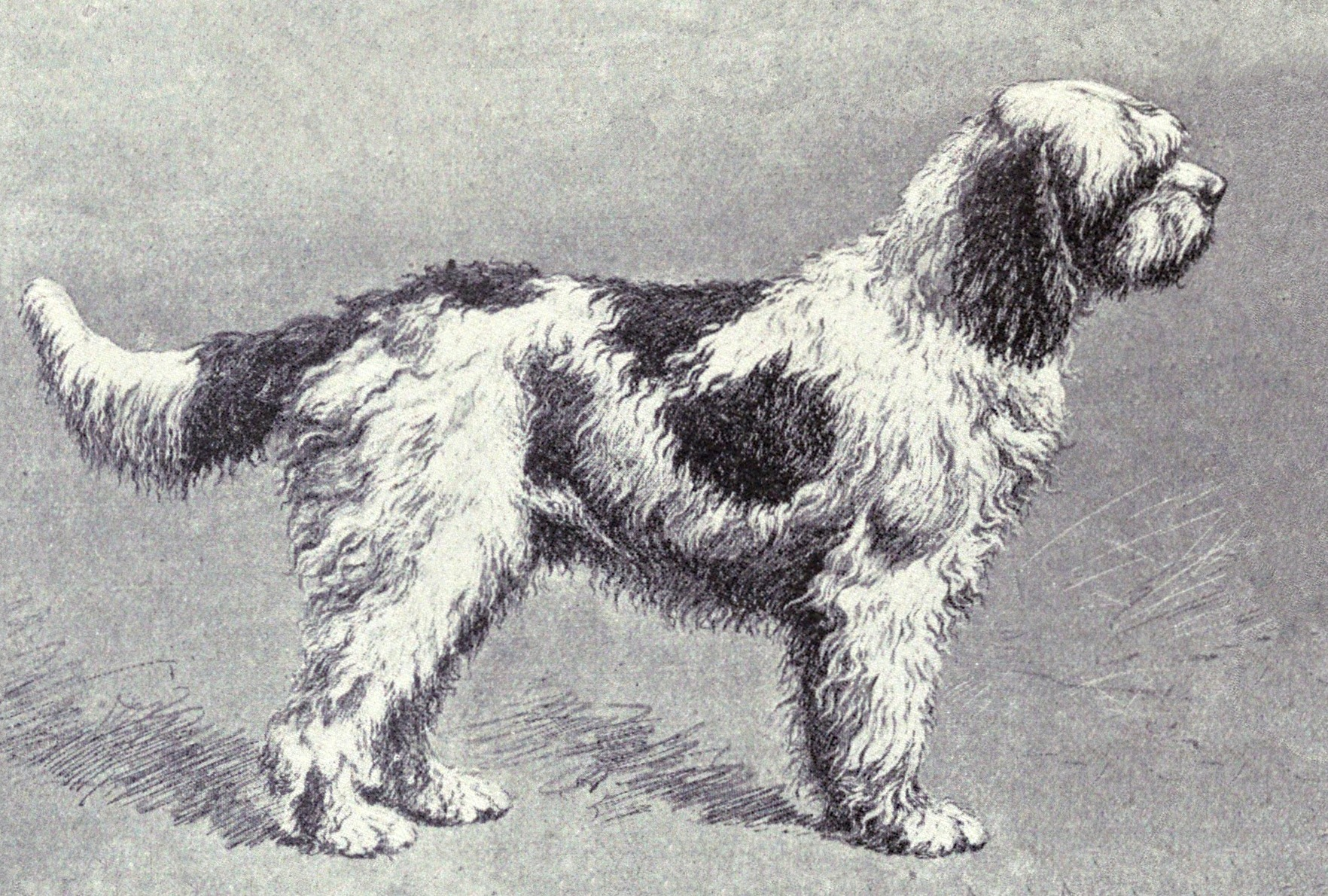
Barbet d'Arret, circa 1915

The Barbet as it is known today is a fairly rare and recent breed development. Over the centuries, the breed existed in various forms, at times serving simply as a companion or guardian dog, but more often utilised as an all-around flushing or working dog. The term barbet gradually became a generic name for any dog with a long, curly, and/or woolly coat. Barbets are perhaps best-known for being a retriever of hunters' quarry, valued by duck, goose, and other fowl-hunters amongst the marshes, wetlands, estuaries and along the coastal areas of France; this wet and dirty job eventually spawned the term "muddy as a barbet", popularised in the 19th century. Between the late 18th and early 19th centuries, the same type of dog was known as the barbet in France, the barbone in Italy, and the Pudel in Germany; additionally, for nearly 100 years, barbets and poodles were considered the same breed.

Like many others, the breed went nearly extinct after WWII. In the 1970s, French breeders attempted to revive the breed. In France, there were 307 Barbets registered between 1975 and 2001. Due to cross-breeding with the Standard Poodle and other breeds, the modern Barbet is notably taller than the historical breed. The dogs with more Poodle in them also tend to have smaller, tighter curls.

It is listed in Group 8 (retrievers, flushing dogs and water dogs) by the Société Centrale Canine, the French Kennel Club, and the Fédération Cynologique Internationale (International Canine Federation), a similar category of breeds as the "sporting" dogs of North American kennel clubs. It was introduced to the US in 1994 and recognized by the American Kennel Club in 2020.

=== Great Britain (UK) ===
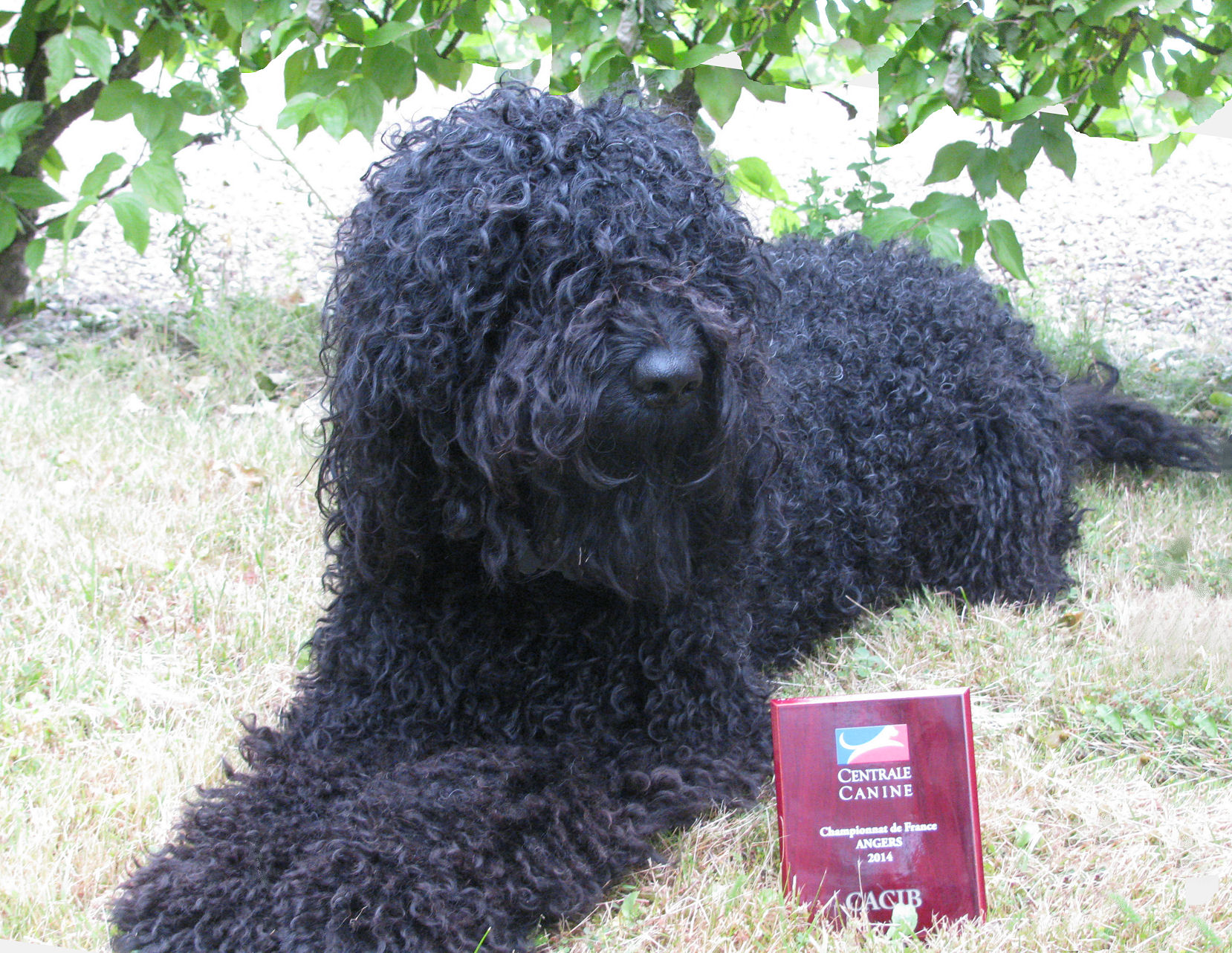
UK-born barbet

The first Barbet, a male, was brought into the UK in 2001, although he did not reproduce. In 2007, two unrelated females were brought in from France; the majority of Barbets currently in the UK are descendants of these. Since then, further examples of the breed have been imported from France, Netherlands, Canada, Poland, and Sweden.

In April 2018, the Barbet became the 220th breed recognized by The Kennel Club of the UK and the Barbet can now be shown in Import Register classes at all UK dog shows held under The Kennel Club rules. Barbets born in the UK prior to this date were registered in France by the Société Centrale Canine (SCC), a national affiliate of the Fédération Cynologique Internationale (FCI). There are on average only one or two British-born litters born per year. In 2018, there were approximately 140 barbets living in the UK.

The majority of Barbets in the UK are kept as pets, although a small number are used regularly as gun dogs, agility dogs, and for search-and-rescue work; they can also take part in conformation shows in the UK and in FCI-member countries, with two British Barbets achieving French Champion status in 2014.

== Notable Barbets ==
- Moustache (1799 – 1812) a barbet who is reputed to have played a part in the French Revolutionary and Napoleonic Wars.
- Médor, a famous parisian barbet. He refused to leave the grave of his master, who died during the July Revolution and thus became a symbol of fidelity and an icon of the uprising.

== See also ==
- List of dog breeds
