= Wetterhoun =

Wetterhoun Frisian Water Dog
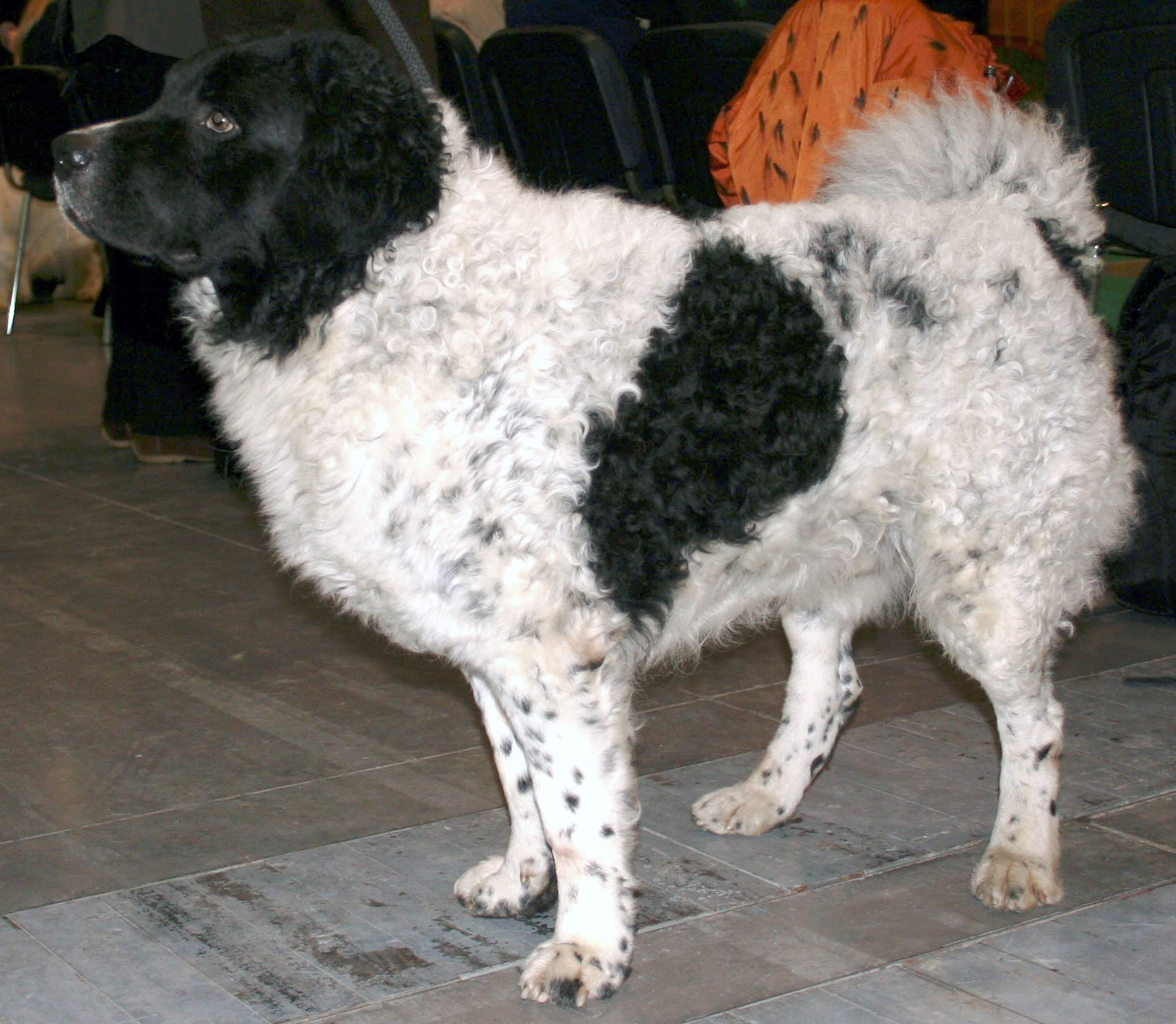
- Black and white Wetterhoun
- Other names: Otterhoun
- Origin: Netherlands
Kennel club standards
- Dutch Kennel Club: standard
- Fédération Cynologique Internationale: standard

The Wetterhoun (translated into English as the Frisian Water Dog) is a breed traditionally used as a hunting dog for small game and waterfowl and native to the province of Friesland in the Netherlands. The name of the breed comes from the West Frisian Wetterhûn, meaning "water dog." The plural of Wetterhoun is Wetterhounen in Frisian. The breed may also be called the Otterhoun (not to be confused with the Otterhound) or Dutch Spaniel, as it can be used to flush game for a hunter's gun.

== Appearance ==
The Wetterhoun is a medium-sized dog, measuring at 55-59 centimeters (21.6-23 inches) at the withers and weighing between 25 and 35 kilos (55 and 77 pounds) at maturity. Their coat is thick and curly except for the head, ears, and legs, where it is smoother in texture; the water repellant coat is described as feeling oily to the touch. Coat colour may be solid black or brown, black and white, or brown and white, with or without ticking or roaning. The texture of the coat should not be woolly, as such hair is not water repellent. The ears are low-set and hang flat to the head, and the tail curls tightly over the back. The breed has an unusual, somewhat stern expression due to the shape of the eyes, which distinguishes this breed from others.

== History ==
The first Wetterhouns lived at least 400 years ago in the Dutch province of Friesland. The breed is believed to have originated from Romani dogs, crossed with an indigenous Frisian dog, perhaps the now extinct Old Water Dog. Dogs of this type were kept for the difficult and dangerous hunting of fitch (Mustela putorius) and otter (Lutra lutra) in the water. The dogs were also used for retrieving waterfowl and served as watch dogs. Although the dogs almost disappeared during World War II, fanciers were able to bring the breed back through careful breeding, and it has since gained popularity.

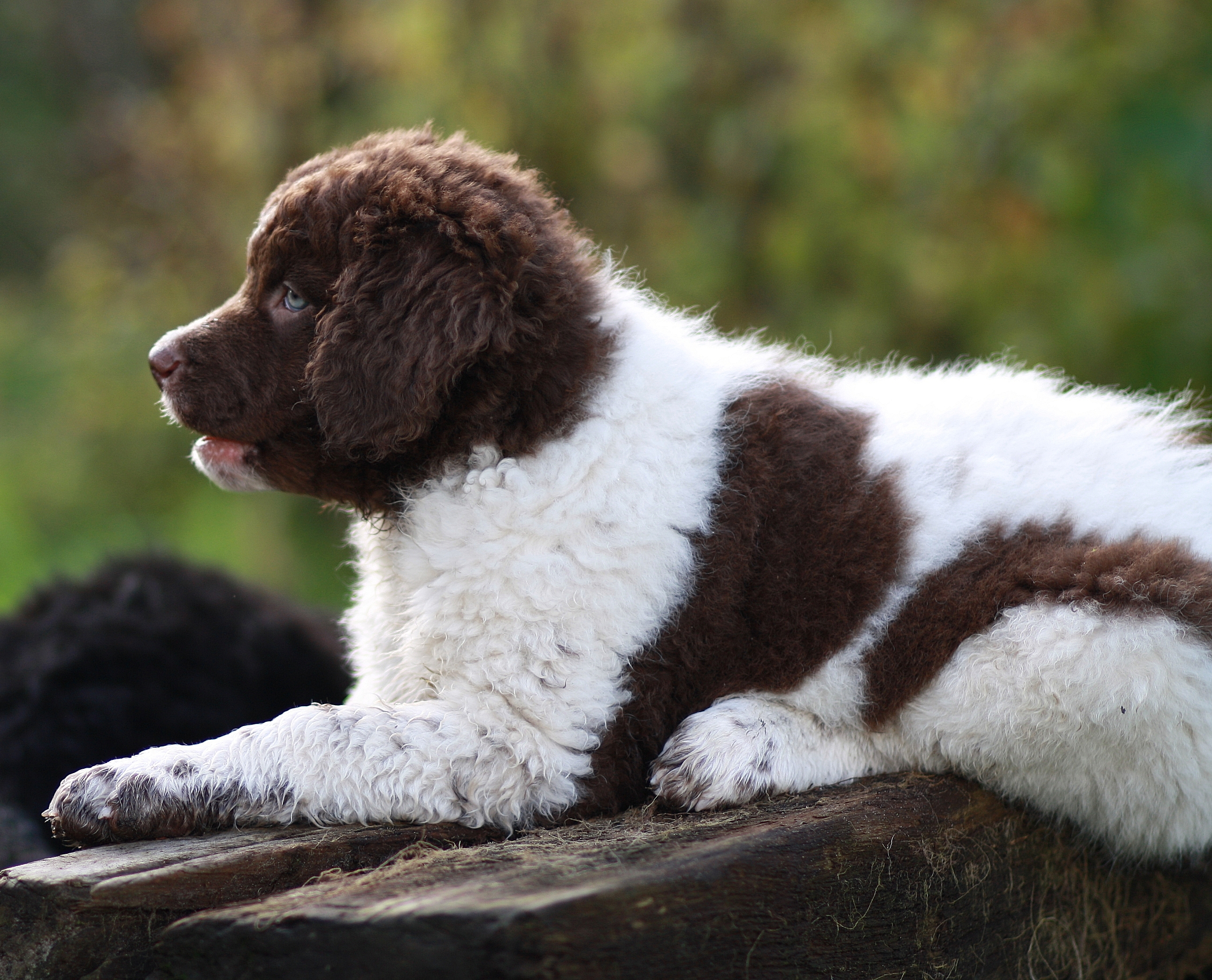
A Wetterhoun puppy

Databases are maintained by the Nederlandse Vereniging voor Stabij- en Wetterhounen (The Dutch Club for the Stabij and Wetterhoun) for assessing pedigrees and computing inbreeding coefficients.

Internationally, the breed is recognised by the Fédération Cynologique Internationale in the water dogs section of Group 8. The United Kennel Club recognises the breed in the gun dog group. The breed is also recognised by a number of minor registries, hunting clubs, and internet-based dog registry businesses and promoted as a rare breed for those seeking an unusual pet.

== Temperament ==
The Wetterhoun is an excellent gun dog, effectively retrieving across both land and water; however, its strong will and natural guarding abilities make early training imperative. The breed standard describes the Wetterhoun as reserved, remarking that it is "the ideal guard dog," despite never being aggressive and enjoying the company of its family.

Although it is described as strong willed, the Wetterhoun is never stubborn or willfully disobedient. They do demonstrate tenacity and a desire to complete tasks, no matter the challenge. They remain focused to complete whatever they believe to be their task. The breed is sensitive and should never be treated harshly or trained using punishment. Given proper socialisation and exposure to different people, animals, and environments in early life, the Wetterhoun is extremely tolerant—so much so that adults should be mindful that children do not take advantage of the Wetterhoun's gentle nature.

== See also ==
- List of dog breeds
