= Dog intelligence =

Intellectual capacity of dogs

Dog intelligence or dog cognition is the process in dogs of acquiring information and conceptual skills, and storing them in memory, retrieving, combining and comparing them, and using them in new situations.

Studies have shown that dogs display many behaviors associated with intelligence. They have advanced memory skills, and are able to read and react appropriately to human body language such as gesturing and pointing, and to understand human voice commands. Dogs demonstrate a theory of mind by engaging in deception, and self-awareness by detecting their own smell during the "sniff test", a proposed olfactory equivalent to the mirror test.

== Evolutionary perspective ==
Dogs have often been used in studies of cognition, including research on perception, awareness, memory, and learning, notably research on classical and operant conditioning. In the course of this research, behavioral scientists uncovered a surprising set of social-cognitive abilities in the domestic dog, abilities that are neither possessed by dogs' closest canine relatives nor by other highly intelligent mammals such as great apes. Rather, these skills resemble some of the social-cognitive skills of human children. This may be an example of convergent evolution, which happens when distantly related species independently evolve similar solutions to the same problems. For example, fish, penguins and dolphins have each separately evolved flippers as solution to the problem of moving through the water. With dogs and humans, we may see psychological convergence; that is, dogs have evolved to be cognitively more similar to humans than we are to our closest genetic relatives.

However, it is questionable whether the cognitive evolution of humans and animals may be called "independent". The cognitive capacities of dogs have inevitably been shaped by millennia of contact with humans. As a result of this physical and social evolution, many dogs readily respond to social cues common to humans, quickly learn the meaning of words, show cognitive bias and exhibit emotions that seem to reflect those of humans.

Research suggests that domestic dogs may have lost some of their original cognitive abilities once they joined humans. For example, one study showed compelling evidence that dingoes (Canis dingo) can outperform domestic dogs in non-social problem-solving experiments. Another study indicated that after being trained to solve a simple manipulation task, dogs that are faced with an unsolvable version of the same problem look at a nearby human, while socialized wolves do not. Thus, modern domestic dogs seem to use humans to solve some of their problems for them.

In 2014, a whole genome study of the DNA differences between wolves and dogs found that dogs did not show a reduced fear response; they showed greater synaptic plasticity. Synaptic plasticity is widely believed to be the cellular correlate of learning and memory, and this change may have altered the learning and memory abilities of dogs.

Most modern research on dog cognition has focused on pet dogs living in human homes in developed countries, a small fraction of the dog population. Dogs from other populations may show different cognitive behaviors. Breed differences possibly could impact on spatial learning and memory abilities.

== Studies history ==
The first intelligence test for dogs was developed in 1976. It included measurements of short-term memory, agility, and ability to solve problems such as detouring to a goal. It also assessed the ability of a dog to adapt to new conditions and cope with emotionally difficult situations. The test was administered to 100 dogs and standardized, and breed norms were developed. Stanley Coren used surveys done by dog obedience judges to rank dog breeds by intelligence and published the results in his 1994 book The Intelligence of Dogs.

== Perception ==
Perception refers to mental processes through which incoming sensory information is organized and interpreted in order to represent and understand the environment. Perception includes such processes as the selection of information through attention, the organization of sensory information through grouping, and the identification of events and objects. In the dog, olfactory information (the sense of smell) is particularly salient (compared with humans) but the dog's senses also include vision, hearing, taste, touch and proprioception. There is also evidence that dogs sense the Earth's magnetic field.

One researcher has proposed that dogs perceive the passing of time through the dissipation of smells.

== Awareness ==
The concept of object permanence is the ability of an animal to understand that objects continue to exist even when they have moved outside of their field of view. This ability is not present at birth, and developmental psychologist Jean Piaget described six stages in the development of object permanence in human infants. A similar approach has been used with dogs, and there is evidence that dogs go through similar stages and reach the advanced fifth stage by an age of 8 weeks. At this stage they can track "successive visible displacement" in which the experimenter moves the object behind multiple screens before leaving it behind the last one. It is unclear whether dogs reach Stage 6 of Piaget's object permanence development model.

A study in 2013 indicated that dogs appear to recognize other dogs regardless of breed, size, or shape, and distinguish them from other animals.

In 2014, a study using magnetic resonance imaging demonstrated that voice-response areas exist in the brains of dogs and that they show a response pattern in the anterior temporal voice areas that is similar to that in humans.

Dogs can pass the "sniff test" suggesting potential self-awareness in the olfactory sense, and also show awareness of the size and movement of their bodies.

== Social cognition ==
=== Social learning: observation and rank ===
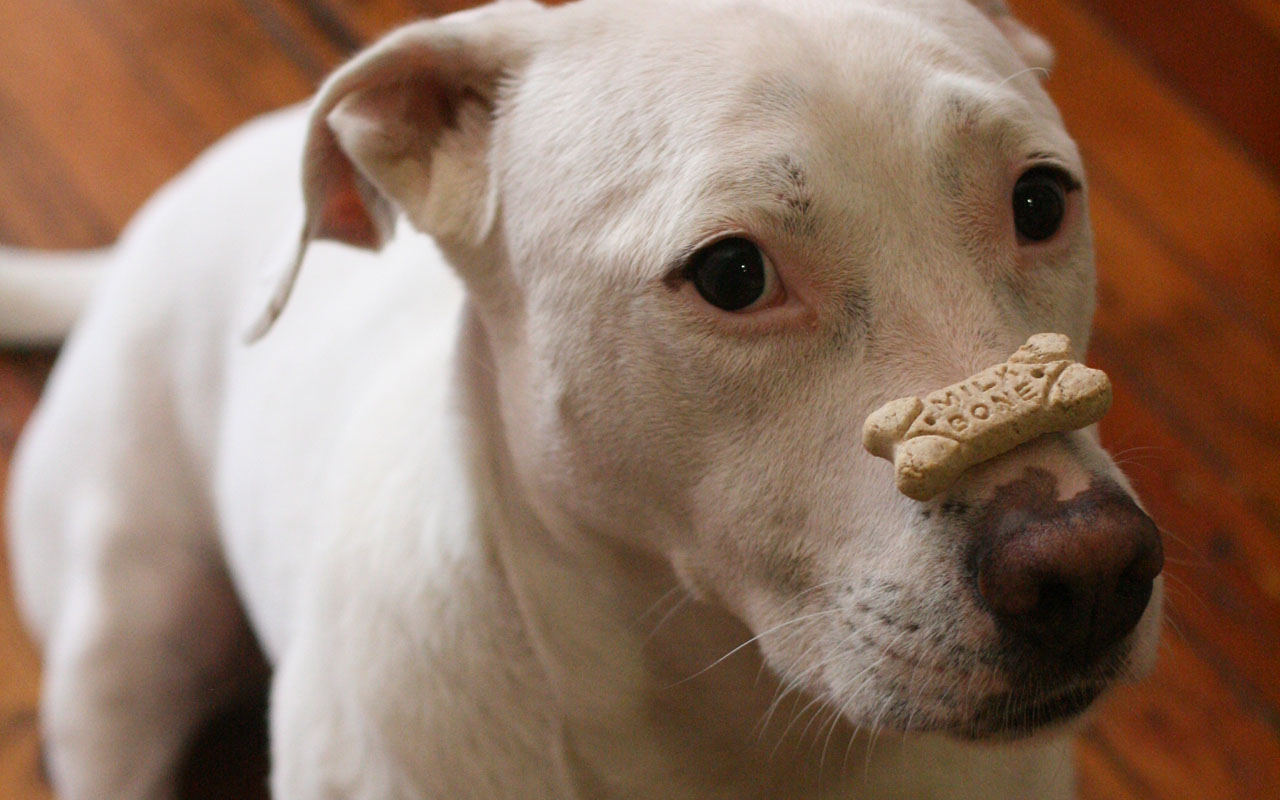
A dog being instructed by its owner to resist eating a dog biscuit

Dogs are capable of learning through simple reinforcement (e.g., classical or operant conditioning), but they also learn by watching humans and other dogs.

One study investigated whether dogs engaged in partnered play would adjust their behavior to the attention-state of their partner. The experimenters observed that play signals were only sent when the dog was holding the attention of its partner. If the partner was distracted, the dog instead engaged in attention-getting behavior before sending a play signal.

Puppies learn behaviors quickly by following examples set by experienced dogs. This form of intelligence is not particular to those tasks dogs have been bred to perform, but can be generalized to various abstract problems. For example, Dachshund puppies were set the problem of pulling a cart by tugging on an attached piece of ribbon in order to get a reward from inside the cart. Puppies that watched an experienced dog perform this task learned the task fifteen times faster than those left to solve the problem on their own.

The social rank of dogs affects their performance in social learning situations. In social groups with a clear hierarchy, dominant individuals are the more influential demonstrators and the knowledge transfer tends to be unidirectional, from higher rank to lower. In a problem-solving experiment, dominant dogs generally performed better than subordinates when they observed a human demonstrator's actions, a finding that reflects the dominance of the human in dog-human groups. Subordinate dogs learn best from the dominant dog that is adjacent in the hierarchy.

=== Following human cues ===
Dogs show human-like social cognition in various ways. For example, dogs can react appropriately to human body language such as gesturing and pointing, and they also understand human voice commands. In one study, puppies were presented with a box, and shown that, when a handler pressed a lever, a ball would roll out of the box. The handler then allowed the puppy to play with the ball, making it an intrinsic reward. The pups were then allowed to interact with the box. Roughly three quarters of the puppies subsequently touched the lever, and over half successfully released the ball, compared to only 6% in a control group that did not watch the human manipulate the lever.

Similarly, dogs may be guided by cues indicating the direction of a human's attention. In one task a reward was hidden under one of two buckets. The experimenter then indicated the location of the reward by tapping the bucket, pointing to the bucket, nodding at the bucket, or simply looking at the bucket. The dogs followed these signals, performing better than chimpanzees, wolves, and human infants at this task; even puppies with limited exposure to humans performed well.

Dogs can follow the direction of pointing by humans. New Guinea singing dogs are a half-wild proto-dog endemic to the remote alpine regions of New Guinea and these can follow human pointing as can Australian dingoes. These both demonstrate an ability to read human gestures that arose early in domestication without human selection. The dog brain has been shown to distinguish between human emotions shown in faces of strangers, particularly happiness, but also between emotions of negative valence such as fear, anger and sadness. Dogs and wolves have also been shown to follow more complex pointing made with body parts other than the human arm and hand (e.g. elbow, knee, foot). Dogs tend to follow hand/arm pointed directions more when combined with eye signaling as well. In general, dogs seem to use human cues as an indication on where to go and what to do. Overall, dogs appear to have several cognitive skills necessary to understand communication as information; however, findings on dogs' understanding of referentiality and others' mental states are controversial and it is not clear whether dogs themselves communicate with informative motives.

For canines to perform well on traditional human-guided tasks (e.g. following the human point) both relevant lifetime experiences with humans—including socialization to humans during the critical phase for social development—and opportunities to associate human body parts with certain outcomes (such as food being provided by humans, a human throwing or kicking a ball, etc.) are required.

In 2016, a study of water rescue dogs that respond to words or gestures found that the dogs would respond to the gesture rather than the verbal command.

== Memory ==
=== Episodic memory ===
Dogs have demonstrated episodic-like memory by recalling past events that included the complex actions of humans. In a 2019 study, a correlation has been shown between the size of the dog and the functions of memory and self-control, with larger dogs performing significantly better than smaller dogs in these functions. However, in the study brain size did not predict a dog's ability to follow human pointing gestures, nor was it associated with their inferential and physical reasoning abilities. A 2018 study on canine cognitive abilities found that various animals, including pigs, pigeons and chimpanzees, are able to remember the what, where and when of an event, which dogs cannot do.

=== Learning and using words ===
Various studies have shown that dogs readily learn the names of objects and can retrieve an item from among many others when given its name. For example, in 2008, Betsy, a Border Collie, knew over 345 words by the retrieval test, and she was also able to connect an object with a photographic image of the object, despite having seen neither before. In another study, a dog watched as experimenters handed an object back and forth to each other while using the object's name in a sentence. The dog subsequently retrieved the item given its name.

In humans, "fast mapping" is the ability to form quick and rough hypotheses about the meaning of a new word after only a single exposure. In 2004, a study with Rico, a Border Collie, showed he was able to fast map. Rico initially knew the labels of over 200 items. He inferred the names of novel items by exclusion, that is, by knowing that the novel item was the one that he did not already know. Rico correctly retrieved such novel items immediately and four weeks after the initial exposure. Rico was also able to interpret phrases such as "fetch the sock" by its component words (rather than considering its utterance to be a single word). Rico could also give the sock to a specified person. This performance is comparable to that of 3-year-old humans.

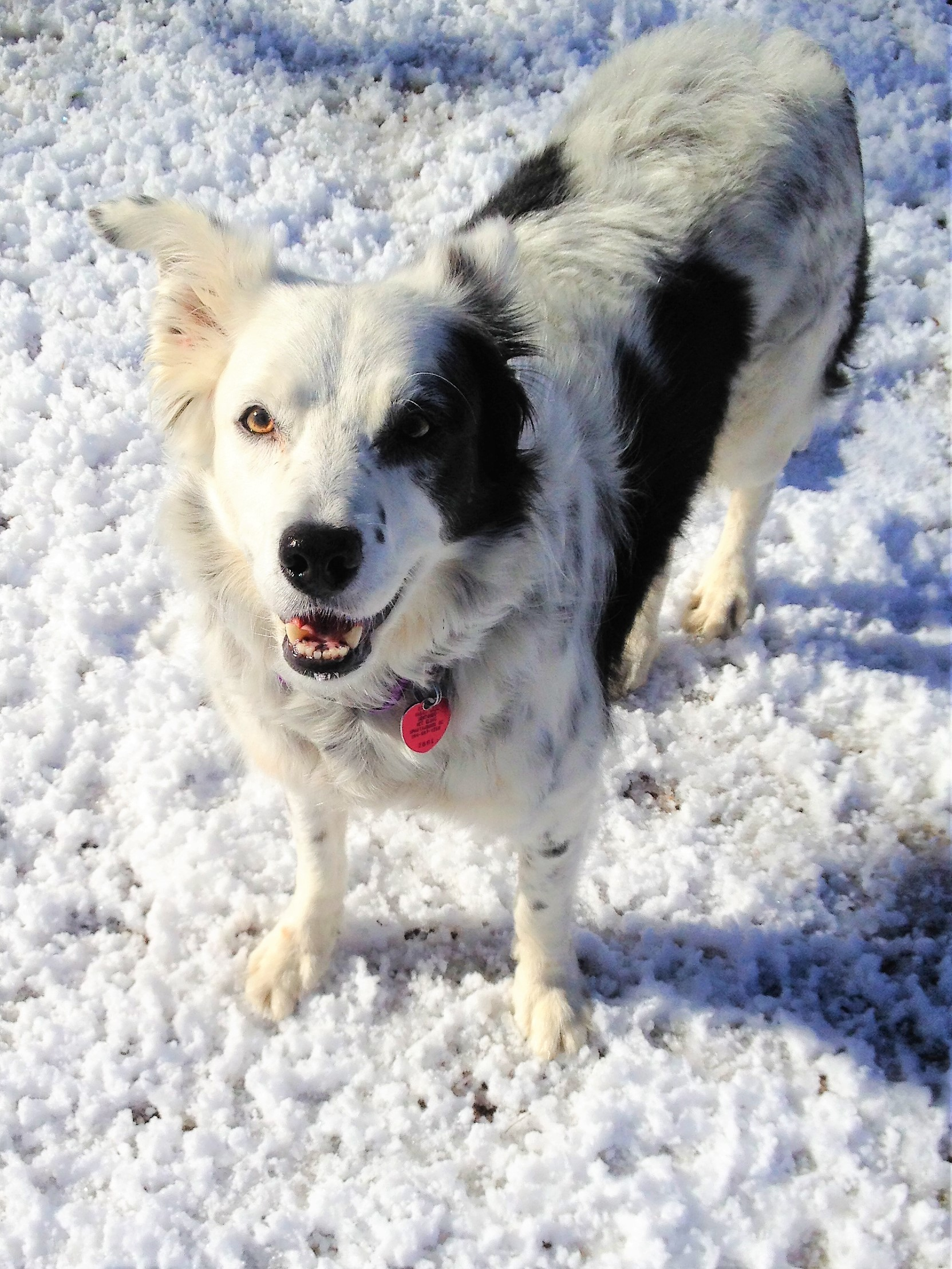
Chaser the Border Collie

In 2013, a study documented the learning and memory capabilities of a Border Collie, "Chaser", who had learned the names and could associate by verbal command over 1,000 words at the time of its publishing. Chaser was documented as capable of learning the names of new objects "by exclusion", and capable of linking nouns to verbs. It is argued that central to the understanding of the Border Collie's remarkable accomplishments is the dog's breeding background—collies bred for herding work are uniquely suited for intellectual tasks like word association which may require the dog to work "at a distance" from their human companions, and the study credits this dog's selective breeding in addition to rigorous training for her intellectual prowess.

Some research has suggested that while dogs can easily make a distinction between familiar known words and nonsensical dissimilar words, they struggle to differentiate between known familiar words and nonsense words that differ by only a single sound, as measurements of the dogs' brain activity showed no difference in response between a known word and a similar but nonsensical word. This would give dogs the word processing capability equivalent to the average 14-month human infant. An fMRI study found that the dog brain distinguished, without training, a familiar from an unfamiliar language. The study also found that older dogs were better at discriminating one language from the other, suggesting an effect of the amount of exposition to the language.

== Emotions ==
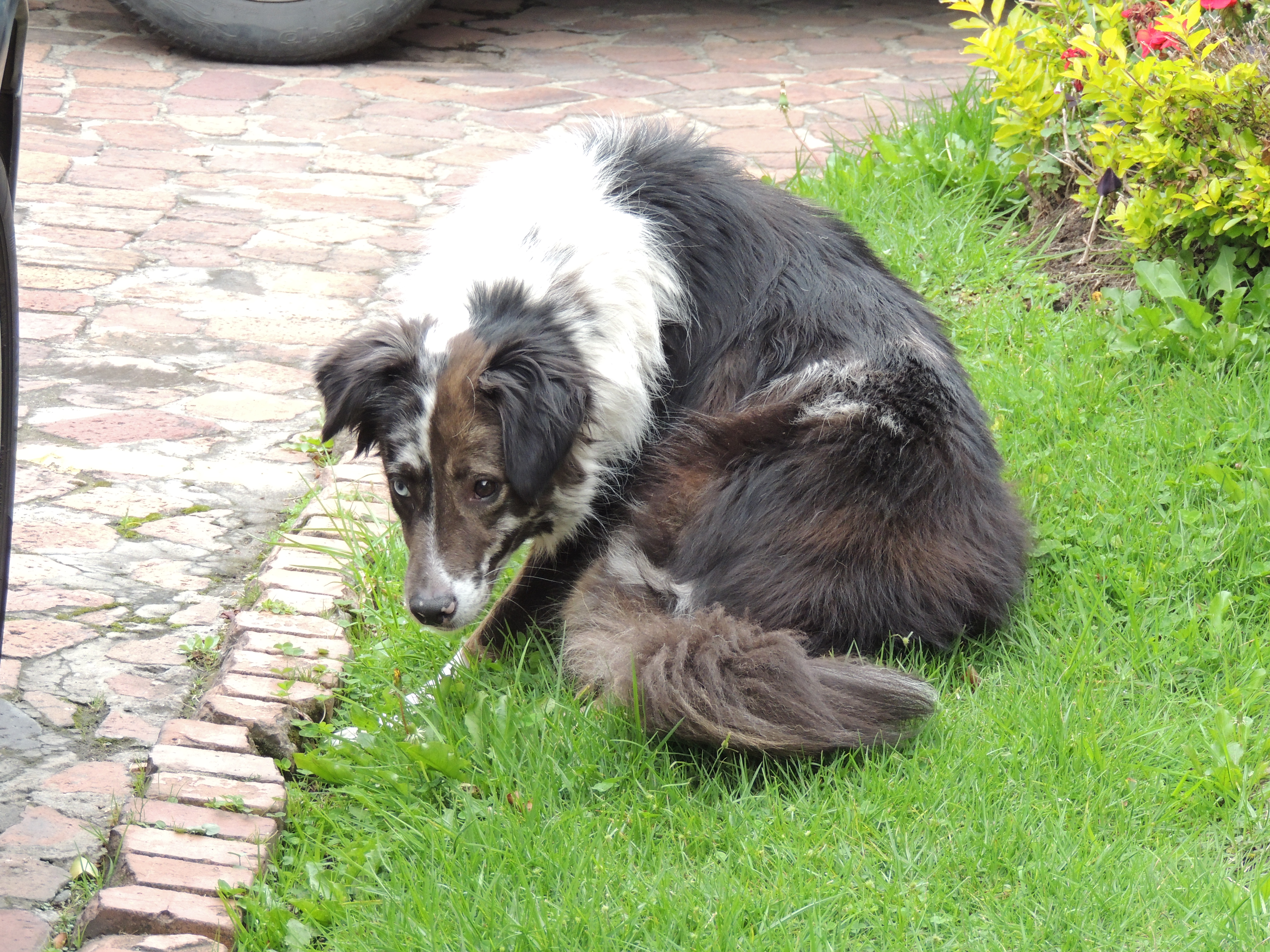
Mix-breed dog showing curiosity and fear while staring at a cat.

Studies suggest that dogs feel complex emotions, like jealousy and anticipation. However, behavioral evidence of seemingly human emotions must be interpreted with care. For example, in his 1996 book Good Natured, ethologist Frans de Waal discusses an experiment on guilt and reprimands conducted on a female Siberian Husky. The dog had the habit of shredding newspapers, and when her owner returned home to find the shredded papers and scold her she would act guilty. However, when the owner himself shredded the papers without the dog's knowledge, the dog "acted just as 'guilty' as when she herself had created the mess." De Waal concludes that the dog did not display true guilt as humans understand it, but rather simply the anticipation of reprimand.

One limitation in the study of emotions in non-human animals, is that they cannot verbalize to express their feelings. However, dogs' emotions can be studied indirectly through cognitive tests, called cognitive bias test, which measure a cognitive bias and allow to make inference about the mood of the animal. Researchers have found that dogs suffering from separation anxiety have a more negative cognitive bias, compared to dogs without separation anxiety. On the other hand, when dogs' separation anxiety is treated with medications and behavior therapy, their cognitive bias becomes less negative than before treatment. Also administration of oxytocin, rather than a placebo, induces a more positive cognitive bias and positive expectation in dogs. It is therefore suggested that the cognitive bias test can be used to monitor positive emotional states and therefore welfare in dogs.

There is evidence that dogs can discriminate the emotional expressions of human faces. In addition, they seem to respond to faces in somewhat the same way as humans. For example, humans tend to gaze at the right side of a person's face, which may be related to the use of right brain hemisphere for facial recognition. Research indicates that dogs also fixate the right side of a human face, but not that of other dogs or other animals. Dogs are the only non-primate species known to do so.

== Problem solving ==
Dogs learned to activate a robot to deliver them food rewards.

Dogs have been observed to learn to use public transport to arrive at a desired destination. In Moscow out of 500 dogs, 20 learned to commute. Eclipse, a black labrador in Seattle, would occasionally ride the bus ahead of its owner when eager to get to the dog park. Ratty, a Jack Russell terrier in Yorkshire, England, traveled 5 mi (8.0 km) by bus to be fed at two pubs.

Captive-raised dingoes (Canis dingo) can outperform domestic dogs in non-social problem-solving. Another study indicated that after undergoing training to solve a simple manipulation task, dogs faced with an unsolvable version of the same problem look at the human, whereas socialized wolves do not. Modern domestic dogs use humans to solve their problems for them. Sex-specific dynamics are an important contributor to individual differences in cognitive performance of pet dogs in repeated problem-solving tasks.

== Learning by inference ==
Dogs have been shown to learn by making inferences in a similar way to children. Dogs have the ability to train themselves and learn behaviors through watching and interacting with other dogs. In one study dogs were first introduced to a setting with two bowls, one with a reward. After four demonstrations to show dogs there was at least one reward in one of two bowls by lifting the empty bowl, showing it, and laying it down, 33% of dogs correctly inferred the reward bowl more often than the empty bowl.

== Theory of mind ==
Theory of mind is the ability to attribute mental states—beliefs, intents, desires, pretense, knowledge, etc.—to oneself and others and to understand that others have beliefs, desires, intentions, and perspectives that are different from one's own. There is some evidence that dogs demonstrate a theory of mind by engaging in deception. For example, one observer reported that a dog hid a stolen treat by sitting on it until the rightful owner of the treat left the room. Although this could have been accidental, if deliberate it would suggest that the thief understood that the treat's owner would be unable to find the treat if it were out of view. A study found that dogs are able to discriminate an object that a human partner is looking for based on its relevance for the partner and they are more keen on indicating an object that is relevant to the partner compared to an irrelevant one; this suggests that dogs might have a rudimentary version of some of the skills necessary for theory of mind. Dogs can figure what a human is seeing.

== Tool use ==
Dogs have been trained to follow commands to drive cars.

== See also ==
- Animal cognition
- Cat intelligence
- Dog behavior
- List of individual dogs
- Animals taking public transportation
