= Good Nature =

Good Nature may refer to:

- Good Nature (Youthmovies album)
- Good Nature (Turnover album)

== See also ==
- Good Natured, a book by primatologist Frans de Waal
