= Betsy (dog) =

Border collie (born 2002)

Betsy (born 2002) is a black and white longhaired Border Collie, credited with being one of the world's most intelligent dogs.

== Biography ==
Betsy lives in Vienna, Austria with her owner, who goes by the pseudonym "Schäfer" (English: Shepherd). Betsy is also a pseudonym given to her by animal cognition researchers. At ten weeks of age, Betsy was able to sit on command and knew numerous objects, such as a ball and set of keys, by their name and would fetch them on verbal command. Betsy was discovered after her owner answered a request by National Geographic Magazine to submit intelligent animals for study. Betsy was one of two dogs whose intelligence exceeded that of Rico, a Border Collie from Germany, who knows over 200 words. Betsy was featured on the cover of the March 2008 edition of National Geographic.

== Intelligence ==
Betsy has a vocabulary of more than 340 words, which rivals that of the great apes in terms of intelligence and lateral thinking. After hearing a word only twice, Betsy is able to decipher that the sound is a command or instruction and regards it as such. Betsy is believed to learn in the same way that human toddlers do, if not faster. Betsy is capable of interpreting the correlation between a two-dimensional photograph and the object it depicts, and is able to retrieve the item simply by seeing the image, despite never having seen the depicted object or the photograph before. During testing, Betsy retrieved the correct item 38 out of 40 times. Betsy knows 15 people by only their name. It is believed that Betsy's unusual intelligence can be attributed to dogs' prolonged association with humans, evolution and her breed—the Border Collie was found to be the most intelligent breed of dog by psychology professor Stanley Coren in his 1994 book The Intelligence of Dogs. Juliane Kaminski, a cognitive psychologist who tested Betsy, hypothesised that her abilities are the result of the use of the Border Collie breed as working dogs, their high motivation levels and that they historically had to pay close attention to their owners' commands when engaged in herding.

== See also ==
- Rico, a Border Collie who was known to understand over 280 words
- Chaser, a Border Collie with a vocabulary of 1022 words
- List of individual dogs
- Koko, a gorilla who learned sign language
- Alex, a grey parrot known for intelligent use of speech
- Dog intelligence
- Human-animal communication
- Animal cognition
