= Rico (dog) =

Border Collie noted for its intelligence

Rico (December 13, 1994 – 2008) was a Border Collie dog who made the news after being studied by animal psychologists Juliane Kaminski and colleagues from the Max Planck Institute for Evolutionary Anthropology in Leipzig after his owners reported that he understood more than 200 simple words. Kaminski et al. wrote in Science that these claims were justified: Rico retrieved an average of 37 out of 40 items correctly. Rico could also remember items' names for four weeks after his last exposure.

== Testing and results ==
Kaminski et al. eliminated the Clever Hans effect using a strict protocol: each of the 200 items whose names Rico knew was randomly assigned to one of 20 sets of 10 items. While the owner waited with the dog in a separate room, the experimenter arranged a set of items in the experimental room and then joined the owner and the dog. Next, the experimenter instructed the owner to request that the dog bring two randomly chosen items (one after the other) from the adjacent room.

Rico's vocabulary was thus broadly comparable to that of language-trained apes, dolphins, sea lions, and parrots.

Rico also responded correctly to a new word with a single exposure, apparently using a canine equivalent of the fast mapping mechanism used by humans. Subject to the anti-Clever Hansing protocols above, a new object was placed alongside seven familiar objects. Rico was told to retrieve the new object, using a word that he had never heard before. Not only could Rico correctly retrieve the object, he also responded correctly to the name of the new object, presumably using a process of elimination.

== Implications ==
Nature columnist Paul Bloom of Yale University, a scientist specializing in children's acquisition of semantics and language, commented on the study, saying that "for psychologists, dogs may be the new chimpanzees." He also had reservations, pointing out that children learn new words in many ways, while Rico learns only through rewards for successfully fetching an object. "If any child learned words the way Rico did, the parents would run screaming to the nearest neurologist."

Border Collies are bred to respond in clever ways to a combination of human vocal commands and whistles, which makes them excellent sheep dogs. Whether Rico's clever responses equate to any kind of language comprehension or even whether they demonstrate any language skill (apart from distinguishing the difference among sounds) is at best unclear.

There are several open questions regarding Rico's abilities that could serve to further illuminate the nature of canine intelligence:

- Can Rico demonstrate understanding of a word other than by fetching an object?
- Could Rico be told not to fetch a specific object (akin to telling a human child "don't touch!")?
- Can Rico learn a word for any object that is not small and fetchable?
- Can the same results be produced with nonlinguistic sounds?

According to Julia Fischer,

"[Rico's ability] tells us he can do simple logic . . . It's like he's saying to himself, 'I know the others have names, so this new word cannot refer to my familiar toys. It must refer to this new thing.' Or it goes the other way around, and he's thinking, 'I've never seen this one before, so this must be it.' He's actually thinking."

== Rico in popular culture ==
Ukrainian indie-rock band Poupée F made a song called "Rico the Clever", which is based on this story.

"Finding Rico", a citizen science investigation named after the dog, was launched in 2021 with the goal of finding and studying other intelligent dogs.

== See also ==
- Betsy, a Border Collie known to understand over 340 words
- The Border Collie Chaser had a vocabulary of 1022 words, could reason by exclusion, and could recognise objects by the groups they belong to
- List of individual dogs
- Koko, a gorilla who learned sign language
- Alex, a grey parrot known for intelligent use of speech
- Dog intelligence
- Human-animal communication
- Animal cognition
