= Clifford L. B. Hubbard =

Welsh antiquarian

- Hubbard with his pet dingo named "Dingy-Pooh" in 1949
- Born: Clifford Lionel Barry Hubbard; 6 April 1913; Clydach
- Died: 16 June 2000 (aged 87); Aberaeron
- Occupations: Antiquarian, writer

Clifford Lionel Barry Hubbard (6 April 1913 – 16 June 2000) was a Welsh antiquarian, dog writer and expert on canine subjects. He has been described as the "greatest canine bibliographer of all time".

== Life ==
Hubbard was born in Clydach and spent his childhood in Aberaeron. He worked as a young man at the European Supreme Dog Bureau in Bayswater and at kennels in Llanarth. He studied the breeding and history of dogs. In 1948, it was reported that Hubbard had 670 British dogs books in his own library. Hubbard was the editor of The Dog Lover's Library series, published by Ivor Nicholson & Watson. He possessed several thousands antiquarian dog books by 1951. He emigrated to Sydney that year to join his wife and children who had emigrated the previous year. His entire collection of books was deposited on loan to the Commonwealth National Library. He spent 5 years in Australia. Upon his return he loaned books to the National Library of Wales. In the 1960s he worked in the book department of Harrods and continued to expand his own book collection.

Hubbard obtained a dingo puppy from zoo owner Garrard Tyrwhitt-Drake named "Dingy-Pooh" and raised it as a domestic pet. In 1972, Hubbard opened the Doggie Hubbard Bookshop in Buxton which moved to Ponterwyd in 1981. The library contained thousands of antiquarian dog books in English and other languages. He donated his entire collection of over 25,000 dog books to the National Library of Wales. His own publications included many books on canine subjects and articles in Kennel Gazette, Dog World and Our Dogs under the pseudonym Canis. Hubbard exhibited at Crufts for over forty years. His last attendance was in 1999, aged 86.

== Death ==
Hubbard died on 16 June 2000 and was buried in Aberaeron.

== Selected publications ==
- Working Dogs of the World. London: Sidgwick & Jackson. 1947.
- Dogs in Britain. London: Macmillan. 1948.
- The Puzzle Bog of Dogs. London: Frederick Warne. 1949.
- The Complete Dog Breeders' Manual. London: Sampson Low. 1954.
- The Observer's Book of Dogs. London: Frederick Warne. 1957.
- A Kennel of Dogs. London: Paul Elek. 1977.
