= George Watson Little =

American veterinarian

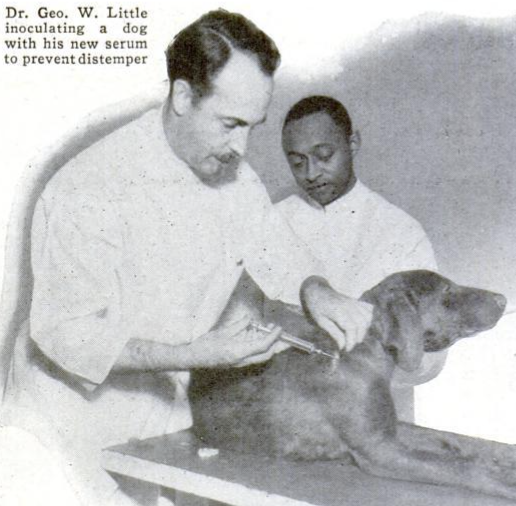
- George Watson Little inoculating a dog in 1935
- Born: 1885
- Died: 19 December 1964 (aged 78–79); New York City
- Occupation: Veterinarian

George Watson Little (1885 – 19 December 1964) was an American veterinarian and dog writer.

== Career ==
Little graduated from Cornell School of Veterinary Surgery and Medicine in 1900 and was a captain in the Officers Reserve Corps. He taught at New York University. During World War I he lectured on "Horses in Welfare" for the Army Corps and was awarded a memorial cup for his patriotic service. He was Chief Surgeon of the American Society for the Prevention of Cruelty to Animals for 14 years and was the head of their animal hospital. In 1935, Little developed a serum preparation to immunize dogs against distemper. He also developed a radium treatment for cancer in animals.

Little was chief judge at the annual pet show of the Madison Square Boys Club for 38 years. His Dr. Little's Dog Book published in 1924 listed canine remedies such as castor oil and milk of magnesia for constipation and cough syrup or creosote steam baths for respiratory infections. Historian Katherine C. Grier has described Little as "perhaps the first American celebrity small-animal veterinarian".

Little was the founder of Dog Heroes, Inc., an animal welfare organization that gave national recognition to heroic deeds accomplished by dogs.

== Death ==
Little died at Mary Manning Walsh Nursing Home, New York City, on 19 December 1964.

== Selected publications ==
- "A New Treatment for Distemper in Dogs". Popular Science Monthly. 91: 434. 1917.
- Dr. Little's Dog Book (1925)
- Diet for Dogs (1929)
- True Stories of Heroic Dogs (1951)
