= Dog writer =

Person who writes about dogs

A dog writer is someone who writes about dogs, such as reporting on dog shows or creating written dog training guides. Additional roles of dog writers include breed features in dog-focused publications, pet care columns, and human interest stories involving dogs.

The term was first used in 1935, when the Dog Writers Association was established. They state 'Some 70 years ago, there was no such thing as a dog writer. There were newsmen and newswomen and magazine writers. Most of the papers assigned sportswriters, reporters, and even copyboys, to cover dog shows. Still, these were the ones who made the dog world an indelible part of our popular culture by writing about dogs on the sports pages of most papers.'

== Notable writers ==
- Edward C. Ash
- Clifford L. B. Hubbard
- Rowland Johns
- George Watson Little
