= Canine Companions for Independence =

American non-profit organization

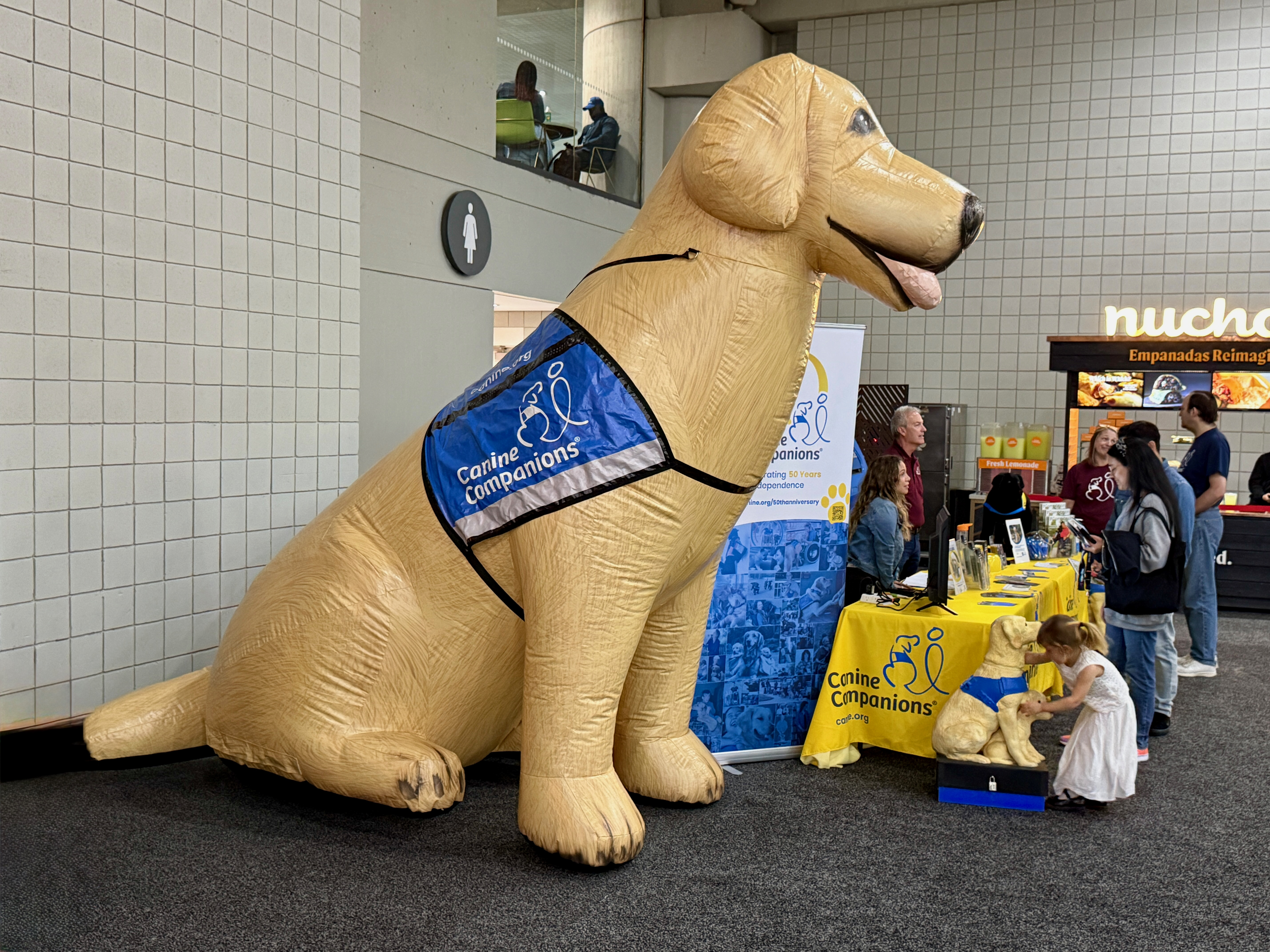
Canine Companions

Canine Companions for Independence is a US-based 501(c)(3) nonprofit organization that breeds and trains dogs to become assistance dogs. It provides these dogs to people who need them, and it trains each person-dog team. As of 2021, it has placed over 7,000 assistance dogs with recipients at no charge.

== Foundations ==
Canine Companions for Independence was founded in Santa Rosa, California, in July 1975 by Bonnie Bergin as the first program of its kind. While teaching in Asia, she had seen disabled people using burros and thought that dogs could serve similar roles in the US. The organization now has a national presence. As of 2024, it has seven training centers and field offices in Washington, California, Texas, Ohio, New York, and Florida. There are also numerous chapters, each of which supports volunteer puppy raisers and fund raising.

The organization pairs people with disabilities with highly trained assistance dogs and ongoing support at no cost to the recipient. All expenses pertaining to the breeding, raising, and training of the dogs are financed via private donations from corporations, individuals, and other foundations, as well as fundraising projects. It is estimated that each assistance dog and a lifetime of follow-up support for the dog costs $50,000. The Lions Club Project for Canine Companions for Independence, which was founded in 1983 as a significant provider of financial and volunteer support to Canine Companions, has donated a total of $3 million. In 2015, Canine Companions partnered with Henry Schein Animal Health, a provider of animal health products to veterinarians, which provides puppy raisers with free health care products.

A special program, "The Veterans Initiative," provides trained service dogs for disabled and injured veterans. The program received funding from a partnership between PetSmart and Canine Companions. In December 2014, the organization joined the United States Department of Veterans Affairs in a study to determine whether service dogs improve the quality of life for veterans with post-traumatic stress disorder.

In 2017, the organization worked with Chrysler brand on a new social online social initiative to raise awareness and support for the work done by Canine Companions. The campaign, "Give a Dog a Job", let people follow along with the training of a particular puppy named Foley, and engage with him and his trainers on Facebook, Instagram and Twitter.

== The dogs ==
Canine Companions trains different types of working dogs: service dogs (e.g., mobility assistance dogs, service dogs for veterans with post-traumatic stress disorder), skilled companions trained to work with an adult or child with a disability under the guidance of a facilitator, hearing dogs for the deaf and hard-of-hearing, and dogs for "facility teams." Facility teams consist of a dog and a human partner, who is usually a rehabilitation specialist, educator, or medical specialist. These dogs carry most of the skills of service dogs as well as specialized skills for however the services of the dog will be incorporated into facility programs and services.

== Breeding and raising ==
Canine Companions uses a breeding program to supply their dogs. They use Golden Retrievers and Labrador Retrievers, as well as crosses of the two breeds.

Canine Companions also works with the Duke Puppy Kindergarten, part of the Duke Canine Cognition Center.

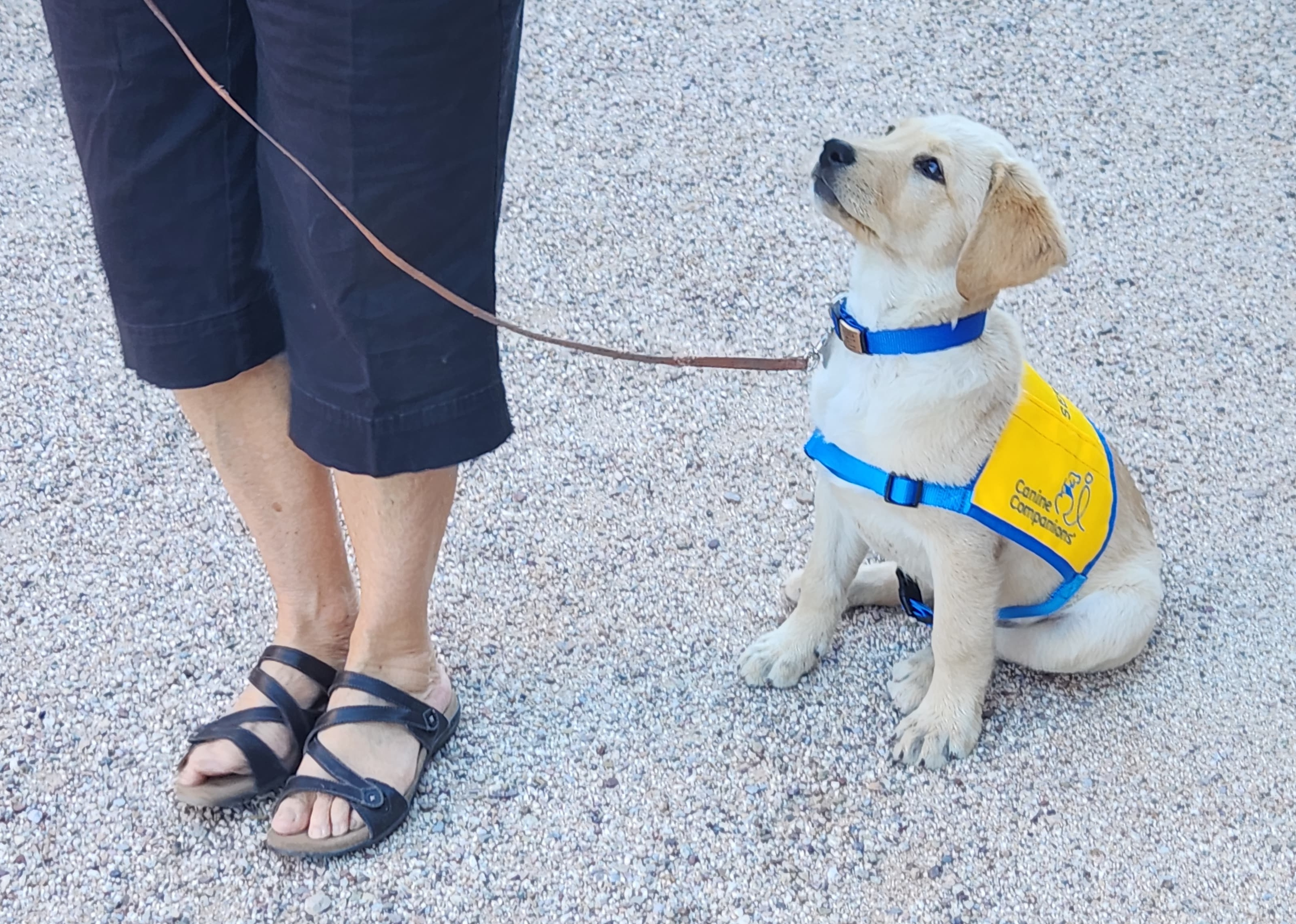
Three-month-old Lab-golden cross practicing with volunteer puppy raiser

Puppies are raised by volunteers who commit to keeping the dogs for 16 to 18 months, when they change to professional trainers.

During these 16 to 18 months, the volunteer puppy raisers are responsible for teaching the puppy its first 30 commands. Several of these commands will be used during advanced training. For example, a puppy who has learned up will put its front paws on various objects, including walls and fences. During advanced training, professional trainers may build that command and associated behavior into skills like turning light switches on and off. The puppies often accompany their puppy raisers to everyday places like school or work to prepare them for life as a service dog.

== Final training ==
The four- to nine-month professional training begins when the dog is returned by the volunteer puppy raisers to one of the organization's seven training centers across the US. The first months of training reviews what the dogs have learned. This period also includes in-depth health and temperament assessments, and each dog learns over 40 commands. The commands are designed to increase a person's independence. For example, the dog may pull a manual wheelchair, retrieve dropped items, and open doors. Dogs may be trained as hearing dogs that alert their deaf handler to sounds in the environment and lead the handler to the source of the sound. In 2018, Canine Companions began a pilot program training service dogs to assist veterans with post-traumatic stress disorder by providing a gentle buffer in crowds, turning on lights and interrupting nightmares and anxiety behaviors.

Individuals invited to be matched with a dog travel to the training center that serves their state for a two-week course that teaches the recipients how to work with their new partners. This includes learning about dog psychology, dog grooming and care, as well as commands that the dogs know. Matching the dogs with the person is done carefully to make sure their activity levels and personalities match. At the conclusion, the individuals go through testing and then participate in a graduation ceremony.

Canine Companions teams return for routine follow-up over the course of the placement. Canine Companions dog users may also periodically return for reunions or extra follow-up training at any time. Their usual term in service is eight to ten years.
