= Letters from Wolfie =

2004 novel by Patti Sherlock

Letters From Wolf
- First edition
- Author: Patti Sherlock
- Language: English
- Genre: Children's historical novel
- Publisher: Viking Books
- Publication date: May 2004
- Publication place: United States
- Media type: Print (hardback)
- Pages: 229
- ISBN: 0-670-03694-3
- LC Class: PZ7.S54517 Let 2004

Letters From Wolfie is a children's novel by Patti Sherlock. It is about Mark Cantrell, a boy living in the United States during the Vietnam War, and his dog, Wolfie. The novel was inspired by real events, and has a strong anti-war sentiment. Letters from Wolfie won the 2005 Merial Human-Animal Bond Award from the Dog Writers Association of America and was nominated for the Young Readers Medal in California, the Young Reader's Choice Award in Rhode Island, and the Maine Student Book Award. It has been translated into Japanese.

== Characters in Letters From Wolfie ==
- Mark: A boy living in the United States during the Vietnam War, he decides to send his dog, Wolfie, to become an army dog.
- Danny: Mark's brother and a soldier in the war until his injury from stepping into a mine; once outgoing, but becomes withdrawn after his experience in the war
- Wolfie: Mark's dog who becomes an army dog. He is described as an energetic, playful German Shepherd mix.
- Tucker: Wolfie's handler; a tough guy who softens after meeting Wolfie, writes letters to Mark
- Claire: Mark's crush who helps Mark in his time of need. She is against the war.
- Eve: Mark's mother who opposes the war.
- Effie: Mark's neighbor who thinks Mark is very smart. She makes desserts for him mostly every day.
- Randall: Marks dad, who strongly believes in the war.
