= Chaser (dog) =

Dog with the largest tested memory of any non-human animal

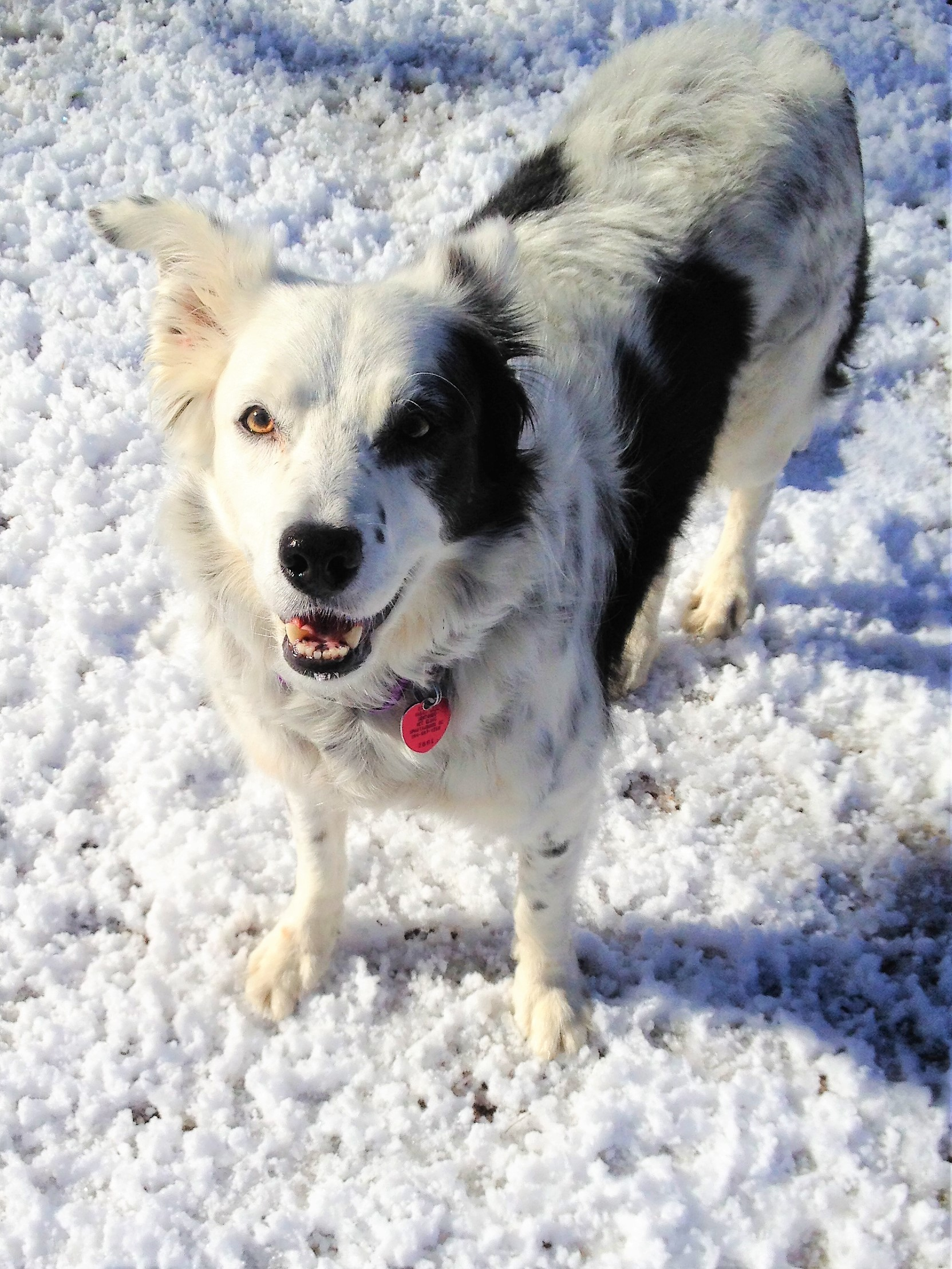
- Chaser in 2013
- Species: Canis familiaris
- Breed: Border Collie
- Sex: Female
- Born: April 28, 2004; Pauline, South Carolina, US
- Died: July 23, 2019 (aged 15); Spartanburg, South Carolina, US
- Title: The Smartest Dog In The World
- Owner: John W. Pilley
- www.chaserthebc.com

Chaser (April 28, 2004 – July 23, 2019) was a Border Collie with the largest tested memory of any non-human animal. Chaser worked with behavioral psychologist John W. Pilley, at his home in Spartanburg, South Carolina, from eight weeks old in June 2004, until Pilley's death in June 2018. Pilley spent that time training her in a formal research project. Chaser could identify and retrieve 1,022 toys by name. Chaser had the largest tested memory of any non-human animal.

In November 2021, Chaser was named the official mascot of Spartanburg Community College, the first mascot in the college's history.

== Background ==
She was bred by Wayne West at Flint Hill Farms in Pauline, South Carolina. She was taught by her owner, Wofford College Professor Emeritus of Psychology John W. Pilley. Pilley's wife, Sally, had given Chaser to him as a 76th birthday present. "She came to me when she was eight weeks old and had been with us ever since", she said. "We were playing with her out in the front yard one day, and a red Jeep came flying past us and she went flying out after the car, so we decided to name her Chaser."

Pilley's formal research was published in Elsevier's journals Behavioural Processes and Learning and Motivation.

== Memory study ==
Chaser could identify and retrieve 1,022 toys by name, which was the result of a years-long research effort initiated by Pilley on June 28, 2004. Pilley documents the following milestones as Chaser's vocabulary grew over time: 50 words at 5 months, 200 words at 7.5 months, 700 words at 1.5 years, and 1,000+ at 3 years.

Chaser began to understand that objects have names at five months of age. At this point, she became able to pair a novel object with a novel name in one trial, although rehearsal was necessary to log it into her long-term memory. She recognized common nouns such as 'house', 'tree', and 'ball', as well as adverbs, verbs and prepositional objects. Based on that learning, she and her owner and trainer Pilley continued her training, demonstrating her ability to understand sentences involving multiple elements of grammar, and to learn new behaviors by imitation.

Chaser could also learn new words by "inferential reasoning by exclusion", that is, inferring the name of a new object by excluding objects whose names she already knew.

== Presence in documentaries ==
Chaser and Pilley were featured in the documentary film, Seniors: A Dogumentary, from director Gorman Bechard. The film premiered in March 2020 at the Belcourt Theatre in Nashville, and was released on DVD and pay-per-view in September 2020. Sharon Knolle in MoviePaws called it "a heartwarming celebration of these sweet animals and the people who make sure their last years are spent with a lot of love and comfort."

The two were also spotlighted in a 60 Minutes piece exploring canine intelligence that aired in 2014.

== Deaths ==
On June 17, 2018, Pilley died in Spartanburg, South Carolina. He was recognized as both a professor and scientist for his research in canine cognition, the latest and most prominent example being with Chaser. Pilley's daughter, Deb Pilley Bianchi, who was involved in training and caring for Chaser, completed a book which she and John Pilley were in the process of writing before he died.

After Pilley's death, Chaser lived with Pilley's wife Sally, and their adult daughters, Deb and Robin Pilley. A year later, on July 23, 2019, Chaser died from natural causes, at the age of 15 years, in the family's home in Spartanburg. In a Facebook post, the family wrote a tribute to Chaser: "We... were with her as she passed. It was peaceful, beautiful, quiet. She had been doing really well and then a couple of weeks ago, she started going downhill very quickly... She is buried with the other Pilley dogs, sprinkled with John Pilley's ashes."

== See also ==
- Alex, a grey parrot known for intelligent use of speech
- Ayumu, a chimpanzee who can remember number sequences
- Betsy, a Border Collie known to understand over 340 words
- Rico, a Border Collie who was reported to understand over 200 words
- Koko, a gorilla who learned sign language
- Kanzi, a bonobo who learned language through keyboard lexigrams
- List of individual dogs
- Human-animal communication
- Talking birds, including a budgerigar named Puck
