= John W. Pilley =

American canine researcher

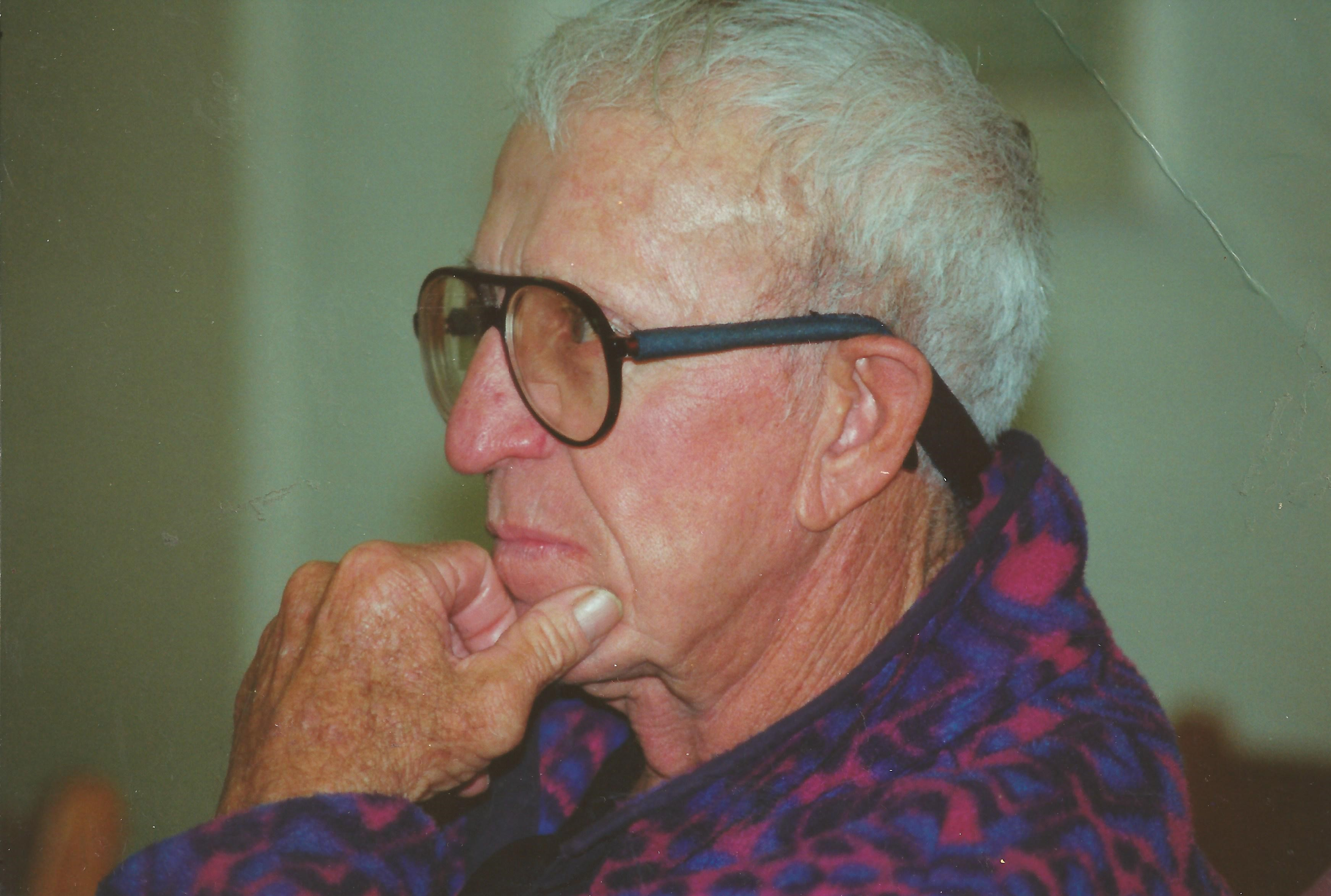
- Born: July 1, 1928; Memphis, Tennessee, U.S.
- Died: June 17, 2018 (aged 89); Spartanburg, South Carolina, U.S.
- Years active: 1969–2018
- Known for: Owner and trainer of Chaser the border collie
- Title: Professor of psychology 1969–1996; professor emeritus of psychology, 1996–2018
- Spouse: Sally Pilley (married 1955)
- Children: Deborah Pilley Bianchi, Robin Pilley

Academic background
- Education: Ph.D. psychology (1969)
- Alma mater: Memphis State

Academic work
- Discipline: Behavioral psychologist
- Institutions: Wofford College

John W. Pilley (July 1, 1928 – June 17, 2018) was an American behavioral psychologist best known for his research into canine cognition and language learning with his Border collie, Chaser, who had the largest tested memory of any non-human animal. He was a professor emeritus in the Department of Psychology at Wofford College and was an avid kayaker throughout his life. Pilley was awarded an honorary Doctor of Psychology from Wofford College in 2016.

== Education ==
Pilley was a graduate of Abilene Christian University in Abilene, Texas. He studied at Pepperdine University and received his theological degree from Princeton Theological Seminary in Princeton, New Jersey. He received master's degrees from Stetson University and Memphis State University, where he also received his Ph.D. in psychology.

== Career ==
In 2013, Pilley teamed with writer Hilary Hinzmann to pen the book, Chaser: Unlocking the Genius of the Dog Who Knows a Thousand Words, which became a New York Times bestseller. Training Chaser was his most notable achievement as Chaser could recognize 1022 words or items. It also discussed other dogs that he trained.
