= Edward C. Ash =

English naturalist and dog writer

- Born: Edward Cecil Ash; 1888
- Died: November 1938 (aged 50); Manston, Kent
- Occupation: Writer
- Spouse: Judith Nora (m. 1913)

Edward Cecil Ash (1888 – November 1938) was an English farmer, naturalist and dog writer.

== Life ==
Ash was born in 1888. He obtained a diploma with honours from the Royal Agricultural College. In 1927, Ash authored the two-volume Dogs: Their History and Development. The book was originally two million words in length but was reduced at the publisher's request to 500,000. The book has been described as a "remarkable modern work". In the 1930s, Ash was considered one of the world's greatest authorities on dogs. He used the pseudonyms A. D. Brasset and A. D. Fielding.

He was also known for his studies of spiders.

From 1911 to 1921, Ash worked as a farmer at Wickham Market in Suffolk. He was a member of the East Suffolk County Council. Ash married Judith Nora in 1913 at Trimley St Mary and they resided at Dallinghoo Hall, Wickham Market. They had three daughters. He joined the British Army in February 1916 and served in the Royal Field Artillery. In 1922, Ash pursued a divorce from his wife over alleged misconduct but there was insufficient evidence presented in court.

In 1929, Ash's private secretary Edna Mary Hine hanged herself at his residence in Ramsden Heath. She had suffered from appendicitis but feared an operation and commented to others that she "preferred to be dead". In 1930, he purchased Lawn House at Ramsden Heath with 14 acres of land on a seven's years lease. Ash filed for bankruptcy in 1932.

In 1935 he lost a high court case against the publishers of a book called The Dog, Hutchinson, and their printers, before Mr. Justice Farwell, in which he alleged that the defendants had infringed his copyright. At that time, his address was given as Manston Close, Manston, Ramsgate.

He married again, to his secretary, Mary McPherson.

== Death ==
Ash was found dead in a gas filled nursery of his home at Manston, Kent in 1938. His wife Mary had discovered his body after she returned from the cinema. The coroner's verdict was suicide "when his mind was disturbed".

== Selected publications ==
- British Spiders: Their Lives, Loves, and Tragedies. London: Robert Holden & Co. 1923.
- Ants, Bees and Wasps: Their Lives, Loves and Tragedies. London: Robert Holden & Co. 1925.
- Dogs and How to Know Them. London: Epworth Press. 1925.
- Dogs: Their History and Development. New York: Houghton Mifflin. 1927.
- Farming. London: Methuen & Co. 1928.
- The Practical Dog Book. London: Simpkin Marshall. 1931.
- Puppies: Their Choice, Care and Training. J. Miles. 1933.
- The Greyhound; Coursing, Racing and Showing. London: Cassell. 1935.

== External ilnks ==
Media related to Edward C. Ash at Wikimedia Commons
