= Cognitive bias in animals =

Influence of decision making by emotions or irrelevant stimulus in animals

Cognitive bias in animals is a pattern of deviation in judgment, whereby inferences about other animals and situations may be affected by irrelevant information or emotional states. It is sometimes said that animals create their own "subjective social reality" from their perception of the input. In humans, for example, an optimistic or pessimistic bias might affect one's answer to the question "Is the glass half empty or half full?"

To explore cognitive bias, one might train an animal to expect that a positive event follows one stimulus and that a negative event follows another stimulus. For example, on many trials, if the animal presses lever A after a 20 Hz tone it gets a highly desired food, but a press on lever B after a 10 Hz tone yields bland food. The animal is then offered both levers after an intermediate test stimulus, e.g. a 15 Hz tone. The hypothesis is that the animal's "mood" will bias the choice of levers after the test stimulus; if positive, it will tend to choose lever A, if negative it will tend to choose lever B. The hypothesis is tested by manipulating factors that might affect mood – for example, the type of housing the animal is kept in.

Cognitive biases have been shown in a wide range of species including rats, dogs, rhesus macaques, sheep, chicks, starlings and honeybees.

== In rats ==
In what has been described as a "landmark study", the first study of cognitive bias in animals was conducted with rats. This showed that laboratory rats in unpredictable environments had a more pessimistic attitude than rats in predictable environments.

One study on rats investigated whether changes in light intensity – a short-term manipulation of emotional state – has an effect on cognitive bias. Light intensity was chosen as a treatment because this specifically relates to anxiety-induction. Rats were trained to discriminate between two different locations, in either high ('H') or low ('L') light levels. One location was rewarded with palatable food and the other with aversive food. Rats switched from high to low light levels (putatively the least negative emotional manipulation) ran faster to all three ambiguous locations than rats switched from low to high light levels (putatively the most negative manipulation).

Another study investigated whether chronic social defeat makes rats more pessimistic. To induce chronic psychosocial stress, rats were subjected to daily social defeat in a resident–intruder paradigm for three weeks. This chronic psychosocial stress makes rats more pessimistic.

Using the cognitive bias approach, it has been found that rats which are subjected to either handling or playful, experimenter-administered manual stimulation (tickling) showed different responses to the intermediate stimulus: rats exposed to tickling were more optimistic. The authors stated that they had demonstrated "...for the first time a link between the directly measured positive affective state and decision making under uncertainty in an animal model".

== In pet dogs ==
Up to five million pet dogs in the UK, approximately 50% of the population, may perform undesirable separation-related behaviour when left home alone. Dogs were trained to move from a start position to a food bowl. When the bowl was on one side of the room ('positive' location, P) it contained a small quantity of food, and when on the opposite side ('negative' location, N) it was empty. In test trials, the bowl (empty) was placed at one of three ambiguous locations between P and N (near-positive (NP), middle (M), or near-negative (NN). Three test trials were presented at each location. The researchers measured how quickly the dogs moved to the ambiguous locations, fast indicating anticipation of food (an 'optimistic' judgement) or more slowly (a 'pessimistic' judgement). These cognitive bias tests show that dogs which exhibit high levels of separation-related behaviour in a separation test also have a more negative underlying mood.

== In pigs ==
Domestic pigs do not appear to develop a cognitive bias when kept in different stocking densities. Farmed pigs trained to expect food inside a bowl in one location and not in another, and then tested to show their responses to ambiguous spatial locations. Forty growing pigs were housed in groups of 10 at different density for 8 weeks prior to the start of the test. Tests on three occasions for each pig did not reveal any difference in cognitive bias according to the pig's history of stocking density.

One study shows that restriction of collared peccaries (Pecari tajacu) in metabolism pens affects their emotional state and increases faecal glucocorticoid (a stress hormone) metabolite concentrations. The researchers noted that these effects were mitigated by environmental enrichment.

== In honeybees ==
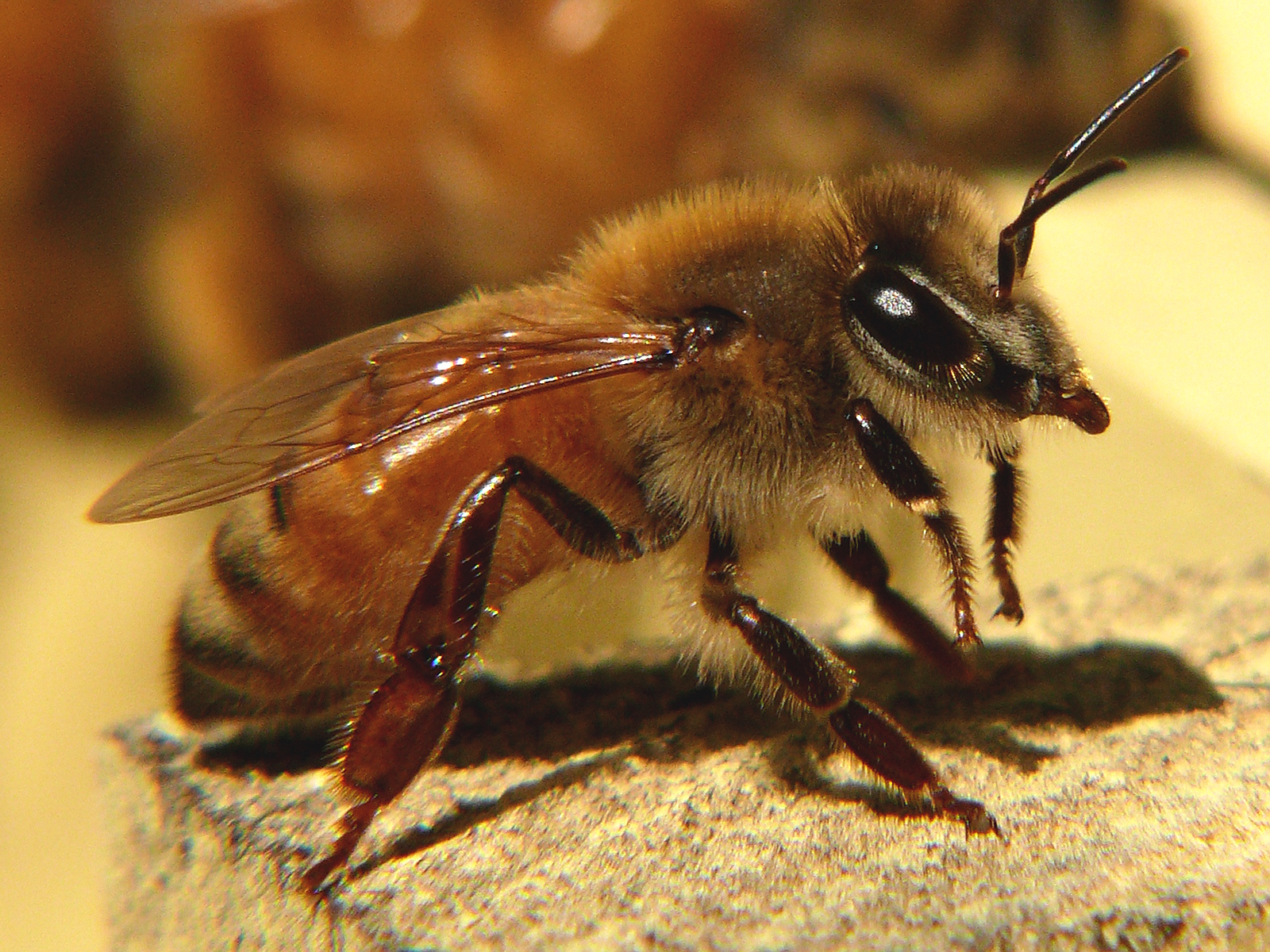
Honeybees become pessimistic after being shaken

Honeybees (Apis mellifera carnica) were trained to extend their proboscis to a two-component odour mixture (CS+) predicting a reward (e.g., 1.00 or 2.00 M sucrose) and to withhold their proboscis from another mixture (CS−) predicting either punishment or a less valuable reward (e.g., 0.01 M quinine solution or 0.3 M sucrose). Immediately after training, half of the honeybees were subjected to vigorous shaking for 60 s to simulate the state produced by a predatory attack on a concealed colony. This shaking reduced levels of octopamine, dopamine, and serotonin in the hemolymph of a separate group of honeybees at a time point corresponding to when the cognitive bias tests were performed. In honeybees, octopamine is the local neurotransmitter that functions during reward learning, whereas dopamine mediates the ability to learn to associate odours with quinine punishment. If flies are fed serotonin, they are more aggressive; flies depleted of serotonin still exhibit aggression, but they do so much less frequently.

Within 5 minutes of the shaking, all the trained bees began a sequence of unreinforced test trials with five odour stimuli presented in a random order for each bee: the CS+, the CS−, and three novel odours composed of ratios intermediate between the two learned mixtures. Shaken honeybees were more likely to withhold their mouthparts from the CS− and from the most similar novel odour. Therefore, agitated honeybees display an increased expectation of bad outcomes similar to a vertebrate-like emotional state. The researchers of the study stated that, "Although our results do not allow us to make any claims about the presence of negative subjective feelings in honeybees, they call into question how we identify emotions in any nonhuman animal. It is logically inconsistent to claim that the presence of pessimistic cognitive biases should be taken as confirmation that dogs or rats are anxious but to deny the same conclusion in the case of honeybees."
