= Dog Writers Association of America =

American trade group

- Founded: 1935
- Headquarters location: Hughesville, MD
- Official website: https://dogwriters.org/

The Dog Writers Association of America was established as the Dog Writers Association on February 13, 1935, at a meeting at the Westminster Kennel Club in New York. Beginning with eight dues-paying members, it gathered dog writers (i.e. the journalists, sportswriters, or others who covered dog shows for the sports pages of newspapers), and obtained amenities and recognition for them at dog shows. In 2010, the association claimed 600 members, and stated as part of its mission to encourage quality writing about dog sports and dog companionship. It does this through an annual writing competition with various awards such as the Maxwell Medallion and Merial Human-Animal Bond Award, which are awarded at an annual dinner on the eve of the Westminster Kennel Club Dog Show.

The DWAA publishes a monthly newsletter called Ruff Dratfs, and also runs an annual writing contest.

== Awards ==
=== Merial Human-Animal Bond Award ===
- 2005 - Letters from Wolfie
