= Stanley Coren =

American psychologist

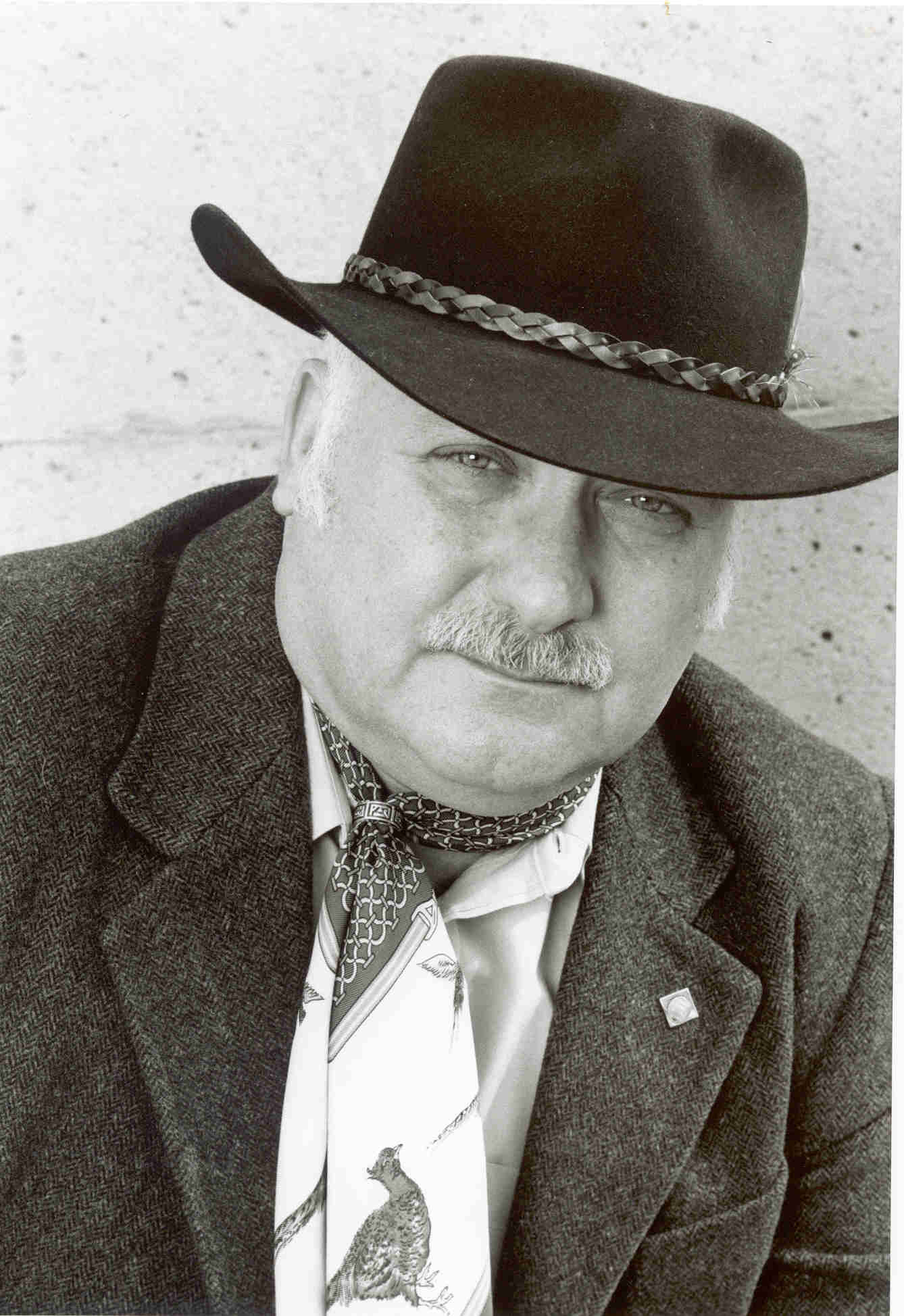
- Born: November 19, 1942 (age 84); Philadelphia, Pennsylvania, U.S.
- Website: www.stanleycoren.com

Stanley Coren (born 1942) is a psychology professor, neuropsychological researcher and writer on the intelligence, mental abilities and history of dogs. He works in research and instructs in psychology at the University of British Columbia in Vancouver, British Columbia. He writes for Psychology Today in the feature series Canine Corner.

== Background ==
Coren was born in Philadelphia, Pennsylvania in 1942 to a secular Jewish family and attended undergraduate classes at the University of Pennsylvania before earning his doctorate at Stanford University. He went on to teach in The Graduate Faculty of The New School for Social Research in New York, New York before moving to the University of British Columbia in 1973, where he was a psychology professor and the Director of the Human Neuropsychology and Perception Laboratory until 2007. He teaches and researches as a professor emeritus and serves as an adjunct professor in the graduate program at Bergin University of Canine Studies.

Outside of the classroom, Coren is an aficionado of dogs, and has made a career of research into dog behaviour that has led him to national television and into international media. He is an instructor with the Vancouver Dog Obedience Training Club, and has participated in obedience trials and competitions across Canada.

== Research ==
Coren has written research papers and articles in a wide range of psychological topics areas including sensory processes (vision and hearing), neuropsychology (handedness, sleep, birth stress effects and behavior genetics) and cognition (information processing and intelligence) published in Science, Nature, and The New England Journal of Medicine. He was named as a Fellow of the Royal Society of Canada. One of his publications (co-authored with Lawrence M. Ward and James T. Enns), Sensation and Perception, has been listed as required reading for coursework at universities and went through six editions before Coren retired in 2007.

Coren's research in psychology can be divided into four subject areas.

=== Sensory processes ===
Coren began his research career studying vision and visual processes. Much of his early work dealt with various visual illusions, and was done in collaboration with Joan. S. Girgus. They are credited with reopening the interest of psychologists in these visual phenomena, and pointing out how they shed light on basic visual processing. He is also credited with several breakthroughs in the study of what is known as subjective contours or illusory contours Later Coren and A. Ralph Hakstian developed methods for screening vision and hearing without the use of technical equipment, using behaviorally validated questionnaires. These allow group or survey testing for sensory deficits specifically for color blindness, color discrimination ability, visual acuity, binocular vision and stereopsis and hearing sensitivity or absolute threshold of hearing. These tests have been disseminated and were reprinted in psychological and sensory textbooks.

=== Handedness ===
Coren worked on left-handedness and its causes and consequences. Specifically his research led him to believe that left-handedness could be a marker for various psychological and physical problems. Findings indicated that left-handedness was often associated with difficult or stressful births. Research showed that left-handers were much more susceptible to accident-related injuries because the constructed world and most machinery and tools are designed for the safety and convenience of right-handers. However the work that caused the largest stir and the most controversy was a series of studies in collaboration with Diane F. Halpern which showed that left-handers have shorter life spans, often dying younger because of accidents or problems associated with a compromised immune system (possibly a long-term consequence of birth stress related trauma). Although originally the source of much controversy, with confirming data coming from a number of other laboratories, these conclusions have become well enough accepted to appear in basic psychological textbooks. The discovery of a possible genetic basis of left-handedness suggests that there may be two types of left-handers, natural left-handers and a separate group who arrive at their left-handedness because of birth stress and are more susceptible to immune system related problems. Coren has suggested that in addition to genetics and birth stress other mechanisms might also contribute to the appearance of left-handedness, such as hormonal factors as in the Geschwind–Galaburda hypothesis.

=== Sleep ===
Coren 's research into sleep deprivation suggests that this is contributing to accidents, psychological disturbances, and increased susceptibility to illness. This line of reasoning eventually led to the series of studies which demonstrated that simply losing one hour of sleep due to the shift to daylight saving time can cause an increase in traffic accidents and other accident related fatalities on the Monday following the time change

=== Dog behavior and the human–canine bond ===
Later in his career, Coren shifted to the study of canine behavior and the relationship that people have with their dogs. This shift away from neuropsychological research also marked a shift in his publishing strategy, away from single study publications in research journals, to publication of his new data as part of material presented in popular book form. Many of his books on dogs do contain previously unpublished empirical data. For example, his book The Intelligence of Dogs is based on a survey sent to all of the dog obedience judges in the United States and Canada, and resulted in the ranking of 110 dog breeds by intelligence. This ranking caused a rather large media stir.

His book Why We Love the Dogs We Do looks at the personality of people and how the owner's personality predicts their relationship with various dog breeds. It is based on a survey of more than 6000 people who took a personality test and reported on their experiences with the various dogs that they have owned. This book proved to be very popular and Coren's personality test is now used by some dog shelters to determine whether prospective owners are suitable for a particular breed of dog. Similarly, his book Why does my dog act that way? uses data from approximately a thousand dogs to determine features of the personality of various dog breeds. However other books that he has written on dog behavior have provided less formal data presentation and in these his creative contribution is based on the organization and interpretation of the research of others, as is the case in How to speak dog.

== Books ==
Coren's first book outside of professional psychology circles was 1993's The Left-Hander Syndrome: the causes and consequences of left-handedness, which presented data on the significant challenges faced by left-handed people in society. His research was discussed widely, and has been printed and discussed in a number of professional journals such as Psychiatric Times. His next book was Sleep Thieves, the result of his studies into sleep and the lack of it. The book examined how the reduction of sleeping time in modern society has created problems of sleep deprivation for many people.

The 1994 publication of The Intelligence of Dogs brought Coren to the wider public eye. A combination of Coren's background in psychology and his love of dogs, the book became an international hit, and has gone through 16 printings to this point.

Since then, Coren has gone on to pen a number of other books on dog intelligence, dog learning and thinking ability, the human canine bond and its implications for people in modern society that have continued to make him a favorite among dog lovers.

The Intelligence of Dogs has been translated into 26 different languages.

A list of his books (listing the most recent editions of each) includes:

- Gods, Ghosts and Black Dogs: The fascinating folklore and mythology of dogs (Hubble & Hattie, 2016)
- The Wisdom of Dogs. (Blue Terrier Press, 2014)
- Do Dogs Dream? Nearly Everything Your Dog Wants You to Know. (W.W. Norton & Co., 2013)
- Born to Bark: My Adventures with an Irrepressible and Unforgettable Dog. (Free Press, 2010)Winner of the Maxwell Medal of Excellence from the Dog Writers Association of America
- Dogs All-In-One for Dummies. (Wiley, 2010)
- The Modern Dog. (Free Press, 2008)
- Why do dogs have wet noses? (Kids Can Press, 2008) Winner of the Animal Behavior Society's award for Best Children's Book
- Understanding your dog for dummies. (Wiley Publishing Inc. 2007)
- Why does my dog act that way? A complete guide to your dog’s personality. (Free Press, 2006)
- The Intelligence of Dogs (Free Press, 2006) [Revised and updated edition, first edition 1993]
- Sensation and Perception 6th ed. (John Wiley & Sons, 2004) [First edition 1978]
- The Pawprints of history: Dogs and the course of human events. (Free Press, 2003)
- How to speak dog: Mastering the art of dog-human communication. (Fireside Books, Simon & Schuster - Free Press 2001)
- Why We Love The Dogs We Do. (Free Press, 1998)
- What Do Dogs Know? (Free Press, 1997)
- Sleep Thieves. (Free Press, 1996)
- The left-hander syndrome: the causes and consequences of left-handedness. (Vintage Books, 1993) [Revised edition with new "Afterword", first edition 1991][Finalist for the Los Angeles Times Book Award]
- Left-handedness: Behavioral implications and anomalies. (Advances in Psychology, North-Holland, 1990)
- Lateral preferences and human behavior. (Springer Verlag, 1981)
- Seeing is Deceiving: The Psychology of Visual Illusions. (Routledge, 2020 -The Revival edition; first edition Lawrence Erlbaum Associates, 1978).

== Other publications ==
Coren is a contributor to a number of dog and pet related magazines including Modern Dog, AKC Family Dog, AnimalSense, and Pets Magazine. He was both on the editorial board and a contributor to Pets: Part of the Family and Puppy and Dog Basics Magazine. He also does the Canine Corner informational blog on the Psychology Today Website which was awarded a Medal of Excellence for the best educational blog series from the Dog Writers Association of America for 2014,.

== Television ==
The success of "The Intelligence Of Dogs," led to the creation of the television show Good Dog!, appearing on the Life Network in Canada and syndicated in Australia and New Zealand. The show is focused on training for the family dog, including how to read body language and how to test intelligence. Coren is also one of the humans on The Animal Attraction, an Australian Broadcasting Corporation program. In 2008 he was featured on the TV show Pet Central broadcast on the Pet Network in Canada.

Coren was involved in the development of The Dog Companion DVD series aimed at aiding dogs with separation issues, providing video intended to give dogs something they can watch when left alone.

== Awards and honors ==
Coren is a Fellow of the Royal Society of Canada and a Killam Senior Research Fellow. He has been elected to fellowship status by the American Psychological Association, Canadian Psychological Association and the Association for Psychological Science. Other honors include a Canadian Psychiatric Association Research Award (1992), the Robert E. Knox Master Teacher Award, and he was awarded the honorary degree of Doctor of Science by the University of Guelph for his scientific and literary contributions.

His writing and his books have received the Maxwell Medal of Excellence from the Dog Writers Association of America for 2011, and the Animal Behavior Society's Outstanding Children's Book Award for 2007. He was named "Writer of the Year" by the International Positive Dog Training Association. His book “Why Do Dogs Have Wet Noses” was named as one of the top 10 Canadian children's books of 2006 by the Ontario Library Association, and received the Red Cedar Book Award (2009) for best nonfiction children's book (sponsored by library associations in British Columbia). His Canine Corner informational blog on the Psychology Today Website was awarded a Medal of Excellence as the best educational blog series from the Dog Writers Association of America for 2014,.
