= Bonnie Bergin =

American canine researcher

Bonita M. Bergin
- Born: 1945 (age 80–81); Port Angeles, Washington
- Education: Nova Southeastern University
- Known for: Inventor of the concept of the "service dog"
- Scientific career
- Fields: Assistance Dog Education and Human-Canine Life Sciences
- Workplaces: Bergin University of Canine Studies, Paws for Purple Hearts

Bonita M. Bergin (also known as Bonnie Bergin) is an American canine researcher. She is the inventor of the concept of the service dog. She is the founder and president of the Bergin University of Canine Studies and the founder of Canine Companions for Independence and Paws for Purple Hearts.

== Career ==
Bergin is a former special education teacher. In her work, she looked "for ways to keep people with disabilities out of institutions". During a trip to Asia in 1975, she saw disabled people using donkeys to assist with transportation and other life needs. Bergin assumed that a dog could perhaps provide people the same assistance. She proposed bringing a dog to the Santa Rosa Disability Center to work with interred people. Bergin went to an animal shelter and adopted a puppy and began training it. That was the first dog she ever trained. Bergin has "trained dogs to do everything from read basic words to identify diseased plants in Napa's vineyards." In 2001, Bergin was awarded the Use Your Life award by Oprah Winfrey.

=== Bergin University of Canine Studies ===
Located in Penngrove, California, Bergin University is the "first and only program in the world that focuses on training dogs and learning about dogs." The school was founded as the Bergin University of Canine Studies The university is accredited by the Accrediting Council for Independent Colleges and Schools. Students come to Bergin from all over the world, and graduates leave equipped with the skills and knowledge to start their own assistance dog organizations or dog-related businesses.

The school offers Associate, Bachelor and master's degree programs and follows a unique model where students enrolled in the university train assistance dogs with the goal of placing the dogs with people with emotional and physical disabilities. The school offers classes on all aspects of dogs, from genetics to behavior, nutrition and dogs in popular culture. As part of the curriculum, students also train dogs at local animal shelters, helping those shelters place those dogs in their forever homes. The Bergin University dogs, which are bred on site, start being trained at 3 to 4 weeks old and are worked with for up to two years to learn 106 different commands. After graduation, dogs may be placed to work with paraplegic or quadriplegic people or others with emotional or physical disabilities. These people join a waitlist to obtain a dog for a fee of $2,750. The cost to train a dog at Bergin University is upwards of $25,000. In 2013, the university awarded Cesar Millan an honorary degree in canine science.

=== Paws for Purple Hearts ===
Paws for Purple Hearts was established as a 501(c)(3) nonprofit in 2011.

== Recognition ==
- 1993, Distinguished Alumni, Sonoma State University
- 2010, Hall of Fame, International Association of Canine Professionals

== Bibliography ==
Works by Bonita Bergin

- Bonnie Bergin's Guide to Bringing Out the Best in Your Dog: The Bonnie Bergin Method. New York: Little Brown & Co (1995). ISBN 0316092843
- Teach Your Dog to Read. London: Souvenir Press Ltd (2006). ISBN 0285637754

Works by Bonita Bergin and others

- Bergin, Bonita, Bonnie Mader and Lynette A. Hart. "Social Acknowledgments for Children with Disabilities: Effects of Service Dogs". Child Development. Vol. 60, No. 6 (Dec., 1989), pp. 1529–1534.
