= Good Natured =

Book by Frans de Waal

Good Natured: The Origins of Right and Wrong in Humans and Other Animals
- Author: Frans de Waal
- Publisher: Harvard University Press
- Publication date: 1996
- Media type: Print (hardcover and paperback)
- Pages: 296
- ISBN: 0-674-35660-8
- OCLC: 33442348
- Dewey Decimal: 599/.052/4 20
- LC Class: BJ1335 .W33 1996

Good Natured is a book by primatologist Frans de Waal on animal behavior and the evolution of ethics.

== Publishing history ==
The book was published in 1996 by Harvard University Press under the full title Good Natured: The Origins of Right and Wrong in Humans and Other Animals. Much of the book details observations of primate behavior, especially that of chimpanzees and bonobos. On the final page, he concludes:

We seem to be reaching a point at which science can wrest morality from the hands of philosophers. That this is already happening—albeit largely at a theoretical level—is evident from recent books by, among others, Richard D. Alexander, Robert Frank, James Q. Wilson, and Robert Wright (journalist). The occasional disagreements within this budding field are far outweighed by the shared belief that evolution needs to be part of any satisfactory explanation of morality. … It takes up space in our heads, it reaches out to fellow human beings, and it is as much a part of what we are as the tendencies that it holds in check.
