= Český Fousek =

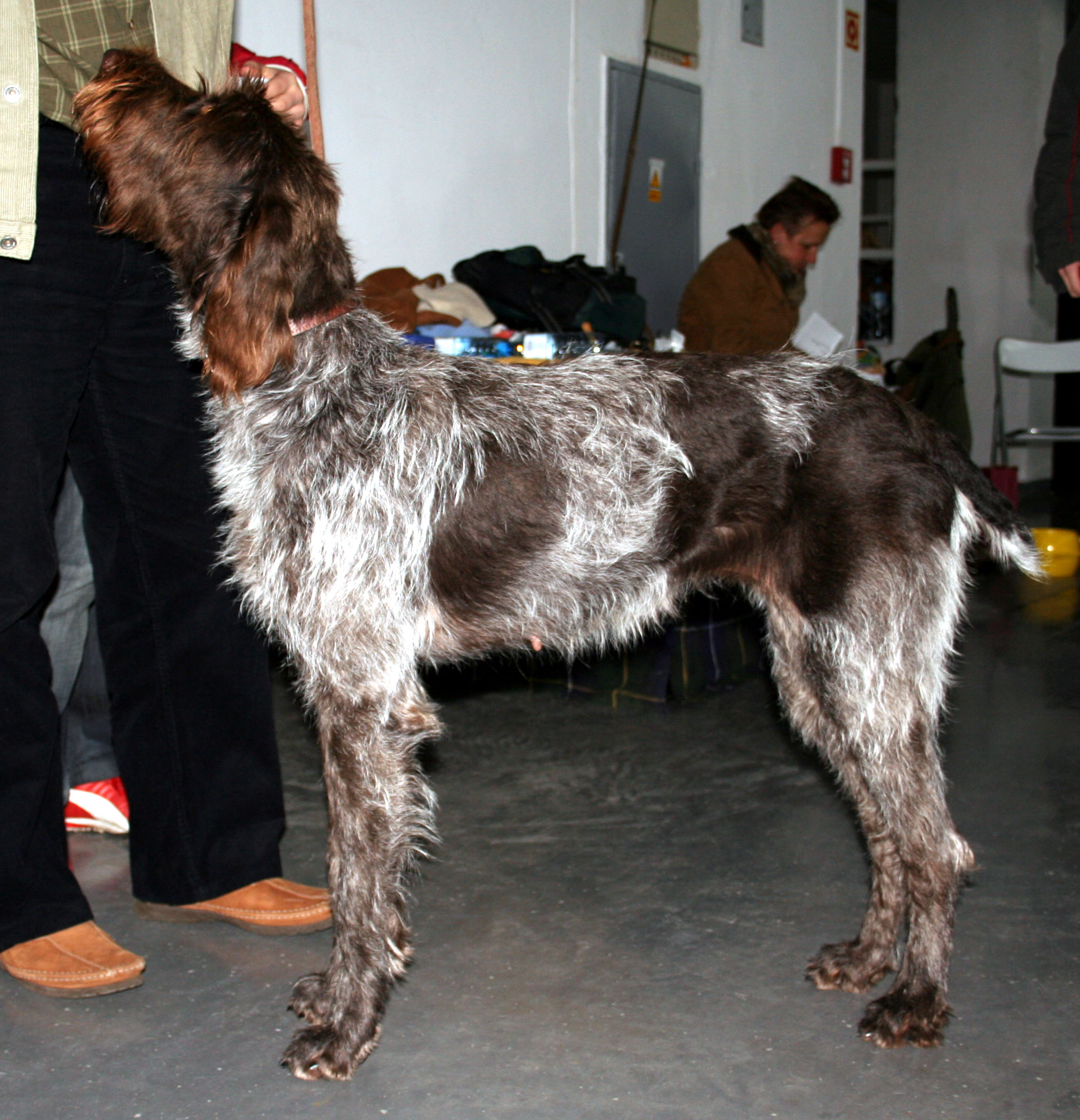
- Other names: Bohemian Wire-haired Pointing Griffon; Rough-coated Bohemian Pointer; Barbu tchèque
- Origin: Czech Republic
Kennel club standards
- Czech Kennel Club: standard
- Fédération Cynologique Internationale: standard

The Český Fousek is a Czech breed of versatile hunting dog that was traditionally and currently used to hunt, point, and retrieve. The name is in Czech, in which český means Czech and fousek is derived from vousy (facial hair) or vousky (whiskers). While the name is used for both sexes, Český Fousek specifically refers to a male dog while the female is traditionally called Česká Fouska. The breed is part of the griffon hunting dog family and have the beard and moustache ("facial furnishings") common to wirehairs. There is a large difference in size between the females and males of this breed, with the weight difference being up to 11 kilograms (24 lb).

== History ==
The Český Fousek is a much newer wirehaired versatile hunting dog in relation to many other European or Continental breeds, with written standards first established in the nineteenth century and FCI recognition in 1964. The breed nearly became extinct in the 1920s, and was saved by dedicated breeders in Czech Republic by breeding with other versatile hunting breeds, such as the German Shorthaired Pointer and German Wirehaired Pointer. This caused problems for acceptance of the breed by the FCI as the German Kennel Club (Verband für das Deutsche Hundewesen) opposed it based on being nearly genetic identical to the Stichelhaar. Separately, this happened again in the US in the 1980s and 1990s with infusion of the Český Fousek into the Wirehaired Pointing Griffon, causing a split among members and the forming of two new and separate clubs, the Cesky Fousek North America (formerly Bohemian Wirehaired Pointing Griffon Club of America) and the American Wirehaired Pointing Griffon Association.

The Český Fousek was used in the creation of the foundation stock of the Slovak Rough-haired Pointer.

== Description ==
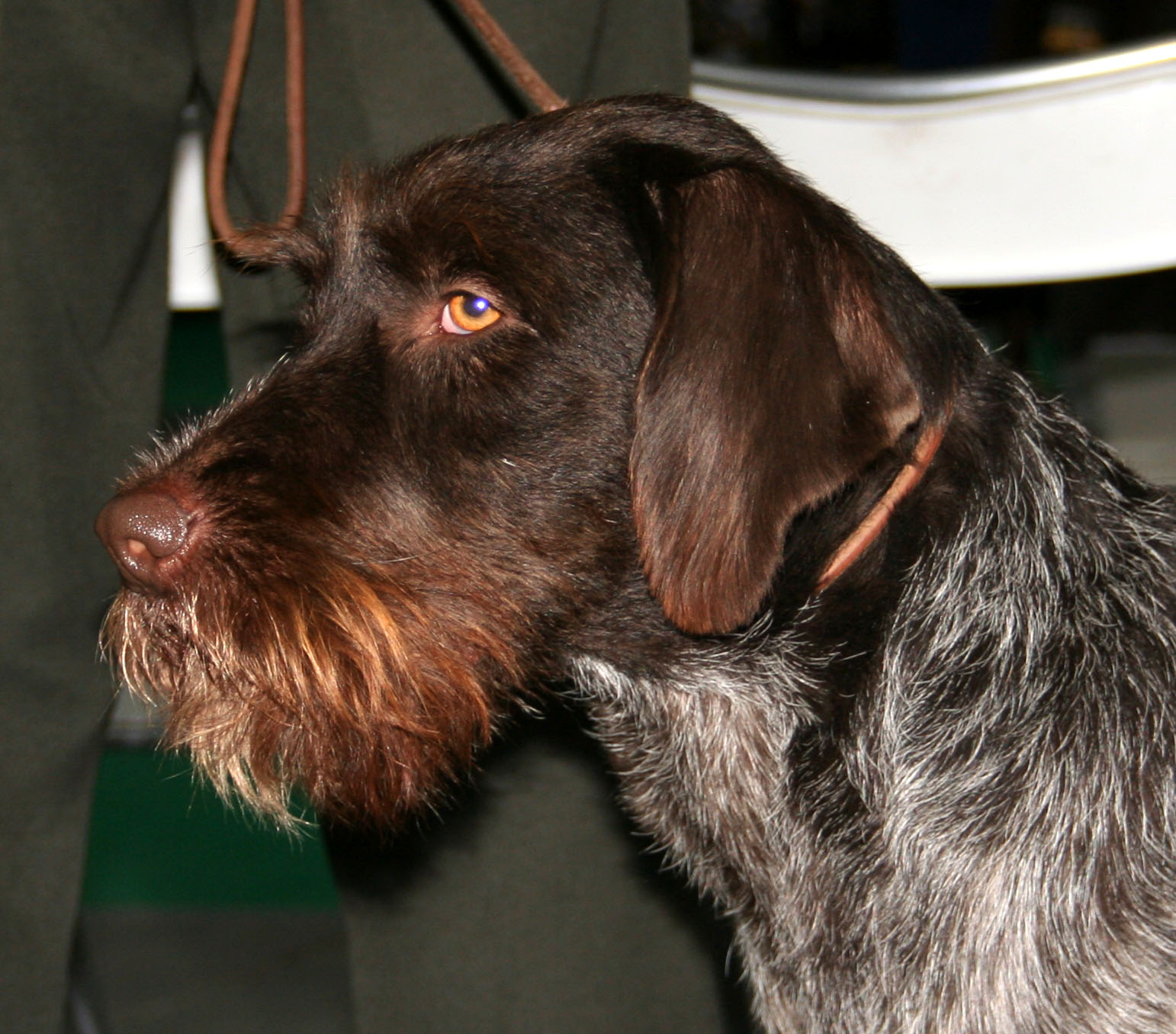

=== Appearance ===
A medium-sized breed with a coarse coat, the Český Fousek is an athletically built dog with a wiry, muscular body. Their most noticeable trait is their distinguishing facial fur. Their soft, bushy eyebrows, mustache, and beard are what make them so recognizable. Their velvety ears hang loosely to the side of their face, while their endearing almond-shaped eyes are deep-set and can be amber or brown in color.

==== Size ====
Mid-sized dog. Height for males 60–66 centimetres (24–26 in), for females 58–62 centimetres (23–24 in). Weight for males 28–34 kilograms (62–75 lb), for females 22–28 kilograms (49–62 lb).

The Český fousek is known for its strong, sturdy build, which allows it to work effectively in various types of terrain. This breed is especially valued for its excellent hunting abilities, including pointing and retrieving in water and on land.

In addition to their physical attributes, the Český fousek is known for its loyal and adaptable temperament. They are highly trainable and work well with humans, making them excellent companions for hunters and families alike.

== See also ==
- List of dog breeds
