= Slovak Rough-haired Pointer =

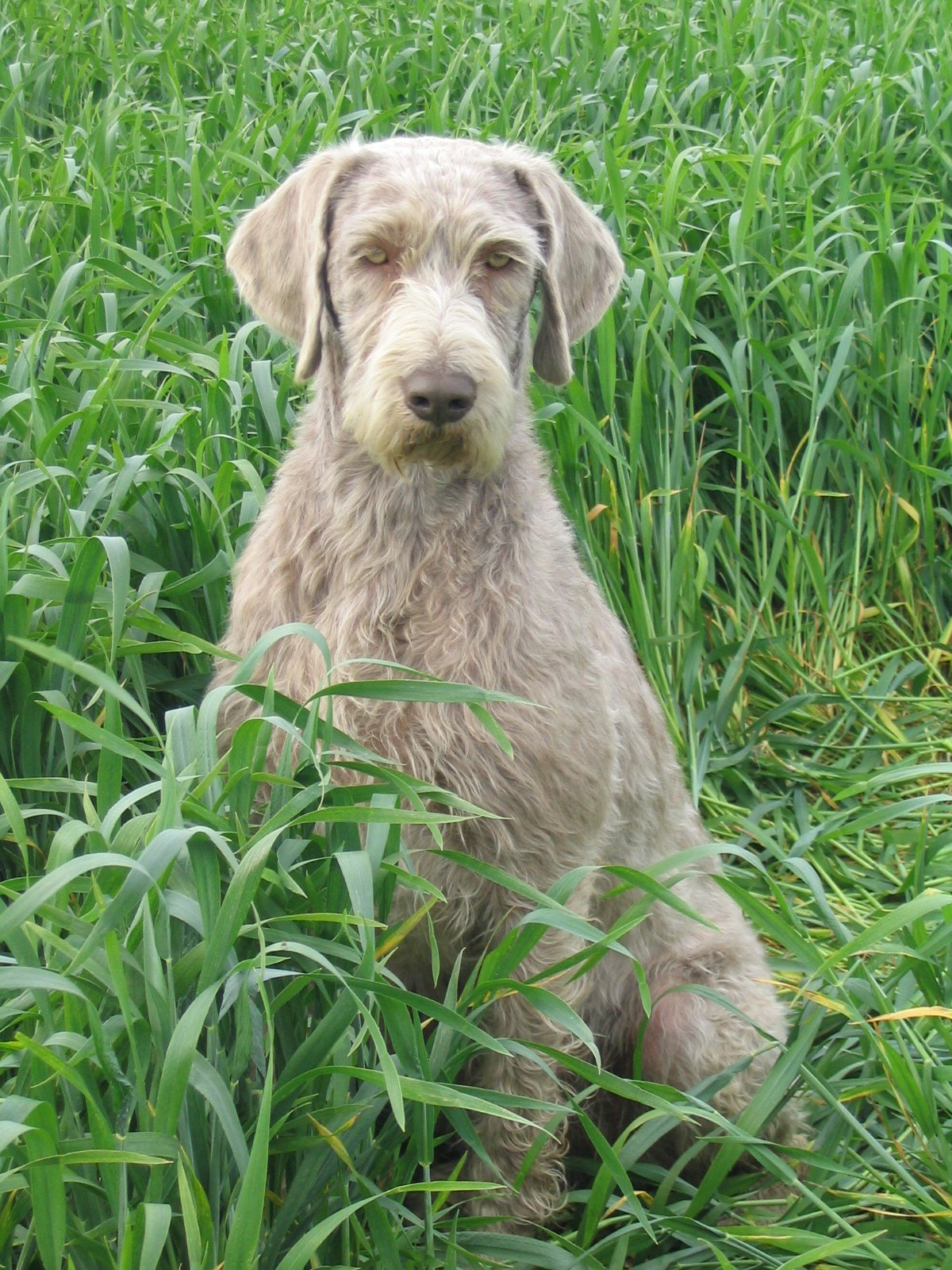
- Other names: Slovensky Hrubosrsky Stavac (Ohar); Slovenský hrubosrstý Stavač; Slovenský Ohař Hrubosrstý
- Origin: Slovakia
Kennel club standards
- Fédération Cynologique Internationale: standard

The Slovak Rough-Haired Pointer (SRHP) is a gundog breed developed after World War II in Slovakia. It is known by many confusingly similar names in English, including the Slovak Wirehaired Pointer, the Slovak Pointing Griffon, the Slovak Wirehaired Pointing Griffon, and the Slovak Wirehaired Pointing Dog. Its closest relative is the Bulgarian Hound.

Despite the nearly identical names, the SRHP is not the same as the Wirehaired Pointing Griffon, a smaller but similar breed with a slightly longer coat developed for essentially the same purposes by the Dutch and now most common in France.

In the original Slovak, the SRHP breed is known as the Slovensky Hrubosrsty Stavac (Ohar), or the Slovenský Ohař Hrubosrstý In other languages, this breed is referred to as the Griffon d'arret Slovaque a Poil Dur, Slowakischer Rauhbart, and the Grifon de Muestra Eslovaco de Pelo Duro.

At one point, the Slovaks who developed the breed asked the Weimaraner Club of Germany to recognize this dog under the name Rough-haired Weimaraner, but the request was rejected.

== Origin ==
The breed was established by crossing German Wirehaired Pointers, Weimaraners, and the Cesky Fousek (also known as the Bohemian Wirehaired Pointing Griffon). The SRHP breed has had slight input from the German Wirehaired Pointer and Pudelpointer as well. The developer, Koloman Slimak, wanted a dog with great stamina which would track, point, retrieve in water or land, and be suitable for a range of prey from birds, hares and other small animals, and large game up to the size of deer.

The breed was accepted by the FCI in 1985 or 1995 and categorized as a Continental Pointing Dog of the braque type. It is not yet recognized by the AKC in the U.S.

First introduced into the United Kingdom in 1997, they were featured in a "meet the breed" segment of the 2007 broadcast of the famed Crufts dog show in Britain.

The breed is also recognized by the North American Versatile Hunting Dog Association and the Malaysian Kennel Association.

== Appearance ==
With a body type much like the three breeds from which its foundation stock was derived, the SRHP has an intelligent, alert expression and a "rough" or "broken" coat, with harsh, wiry hair and whiskers ("facial furnishings" or, informally, "moustaches") like those of the German Wirehaired Pointer or the Cesky Fousek. The coat is of moderate length in any shade between a tweedy gray-brown and the classic pewter-silver coat of the Weimeraner. The eyes may range from the deep amber of the German Wirehaired Pointer to the light shades seen in the Weimaraner.

The FCI has developed a detailed standard which states the eyes of juveniles may be "azure" but those of adults must be amber. White is permitted on the chest and feet. Lighter and darker shades of gray are permitted throughout the coat, even to the point of speckling. The FCI standard further requires a dark nose, eyelids, and pads of the feet; a scissors bite; and a moderately sloped stop of about 45°. Per the FCI standard, the tail is docked at 50% of natural length, and the dewclaws are removed. The back is straight, and the height at the withers ought to be from 62–68 cm (24–27 in) for males and from 57–64 cm (22–25 in) for bitches. The FCI standard also states that "the ratio of length of the body to the height at the withers must be of 10:9 in the males and of 10:8 in the females."

== See also ==
- List of dog breeds
- Griffon
- Pointing breed
- Wirehaired Pointing Griffon
