= Gordon Setter =

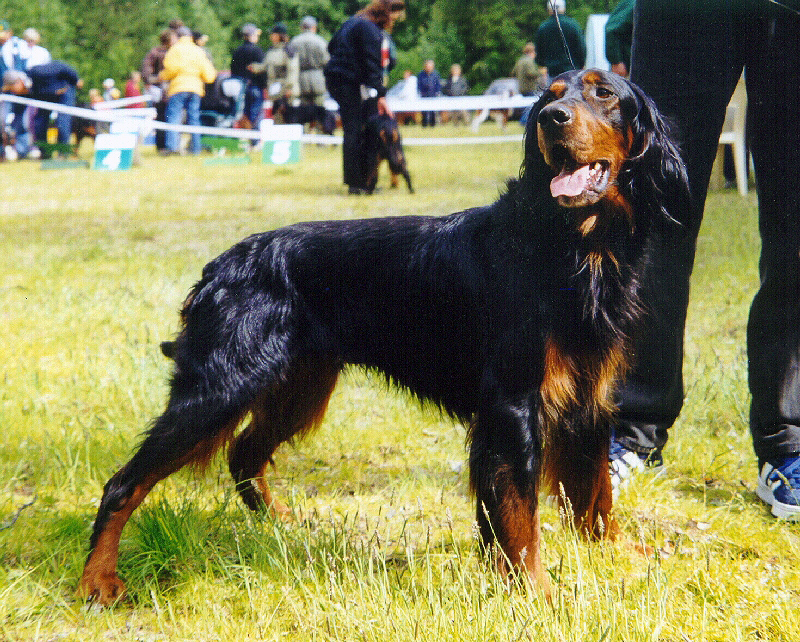
- A Gordon Setter
- Origin: Scotland
Traits
Height	Males	24–27 in (61–69 cm)
	Females	23–26 in (58–66 cm)
Weight	Males	55–80 lb (25–36 kg)
	Females	45–70 lb (20–32 kg)
- Coat: Soft and shining, straight or slightly wave
- Color: Black, Brown, Fawn
Kennel club standards
- The Kennel Club: standard
- Fédération Cynologique Internationale: standard

The Gordon Setter is a Scottish large breed of dog, a member of the setter family that also includes both the better-known Irish Setter and the English Setter. Setter breeds are classified as members of either the Sporting or Gundog Group depending on the national kennel club or council.

The original purpose of the breed was to hunt gamebirds. Their quarry in Scotland, may be partridge or grouse, pheasant, ptarmigan, blackgame, snipe or woodcock: whilst overseas bird dogs are worked on quail, willow grouse, sand grouse, guinea fowl, sagehen, francolin and any other bird that will sit to a dog—that is to say, will attempt to avoid a potential predator by concealment rather than by taking to the wing at the first sign of danger. It is this combination of a bird that will sit fast in front of a dog that will remain on point that makes bird dog work possible.

== Description ==
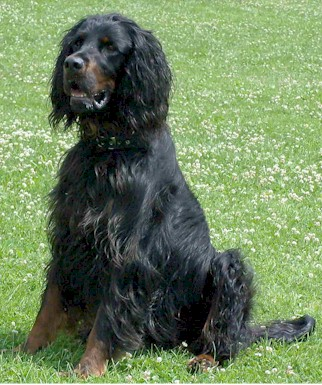
Gordon Setter

=== Appearance ===
Gordon Setters, also known as "black and tans", have a coal-black coat with distinctive markings of a rich chestnut or mahogany colour on their paws and lower legs, vents, throat, and muzzles; one spot above each eye; and two spots on their chest. A small amount of white is allowed on the chest. Although uncommon, red Gordons are occasionally born to normal-coloured parents, the result of expression of a recessive red gene. Predominantly tan, red, or buff dogs are ineligible for showing. A Gordon's coat is straight or slightly waved (but not curly), long and silky, with chest, stomach, ear, leg, and tail feathering. According to the AKC breed standard, "the bearing is intelligent, noble, and dignified". They are the heaviest of the setter breeds, with males reaching 27 inches (69 cm) at the withers and up to 80 pounds (36 kg) in weight.

=== Temperament ===
The AKC describes the Gordon Setter temperament as "alert, interested, and confident. He is fearless and willing, intelligent, and capable. He is loyal and affectionate, and strong-minded enough to stand the rigors of training". Gordons are intensely loyal to their owners; thrive in an attentive, loving environment; and are good family dogs. Puppies and adult dogs can be quite boisterous, and although they are patient by nature, may not be suitable for households with very young children. Gordons are sensitive and empathic, eager to learn, and need firm but gentle handling. Early socialisation and obedience training are important. The breed is one of the slowest to mature, not hitting prime until three years of age or more, and will show puppy-like characteristics well into their older years.

Gordons were bred to run, and require 60 to 80 minutes of vigorous exercise daily. Young dogs should not be over-exercised or begin agility training until they are at least 18 months old, to avoid joint problems later in life. Because of their hunting instincts, Gordons should not be allowed to roam freely if unsupervised, as they are apt to wander into a potentially dangerous traffic situation while following a scent.

== Health ==
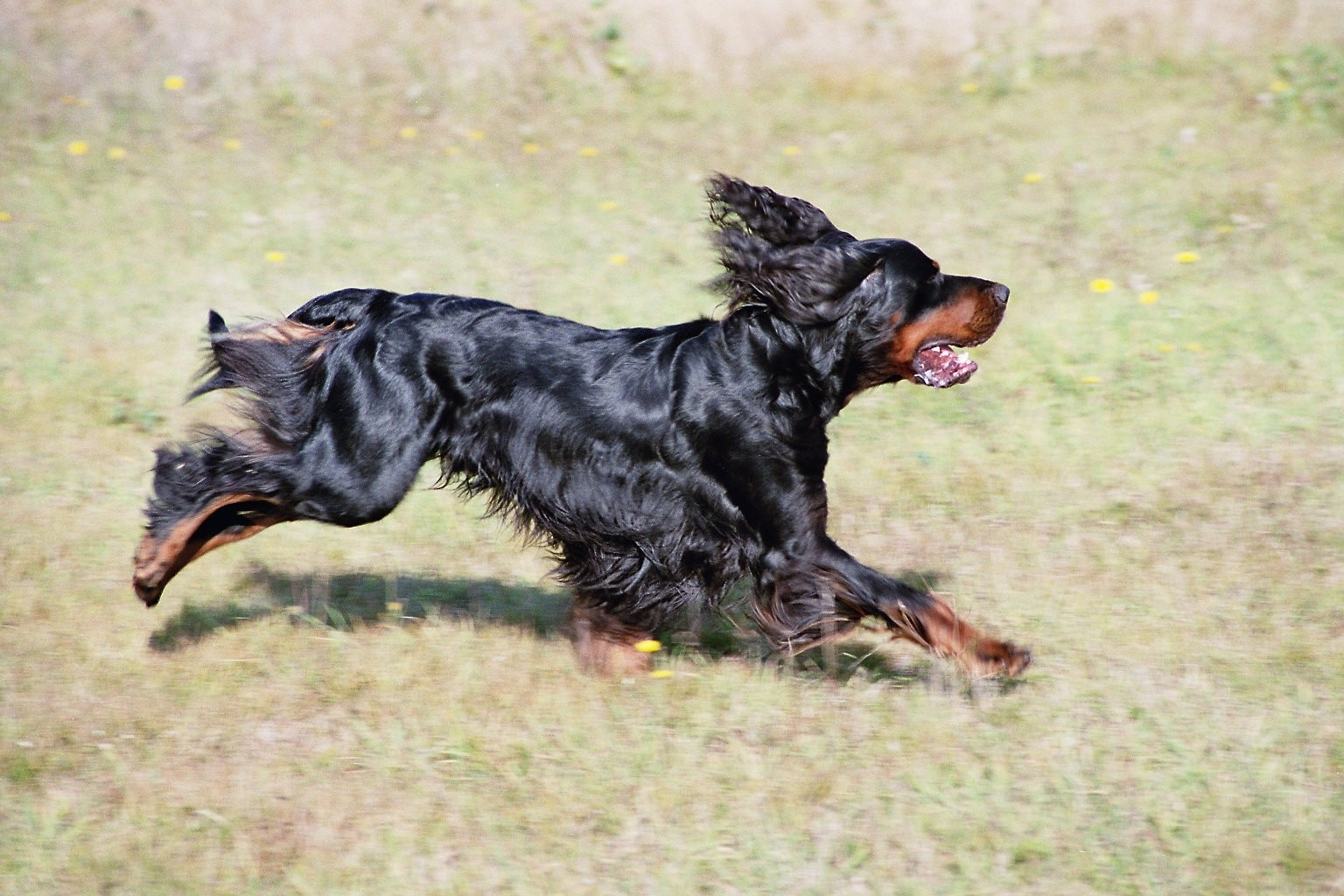
Gordon Setter running

A 2024 UK study found a life expectancy of 12.4 years for the breed compared to an average of 12.7 for purebreeds and 12 for crossbreeds.

Although not as prone to hip dysplasia as many of the larger breeds, Gordons can suffer from the condition. Other health issues can include hypothyroidism, gastric torsion (bloat) and eye diseases such as progressive retinal atrophy (PRA), and cataracts. Life expectancy for the breed is generally about 10 to 15 years.

At the beginning of 2009, a report was issued to all of the Breed Clubs in the UK concerning cases of late onset PRA in Gordon Setters.

On March 14, 2011, Animal Health Trust (AHT) made a DNA test available. The mutation is termed rcd4 (for rod-cone degeneration 4) to distinguish it from other, previously described forms of rod-cone degeneration. It is recessive, and 19 out of the 21 Gordons in their study who had clinical signs of PRA were homozygous for this mutation, indicating it is the major cause of PRA in the breed. As many as 50% of Gordon Setters may be carriers.

== Origin ==
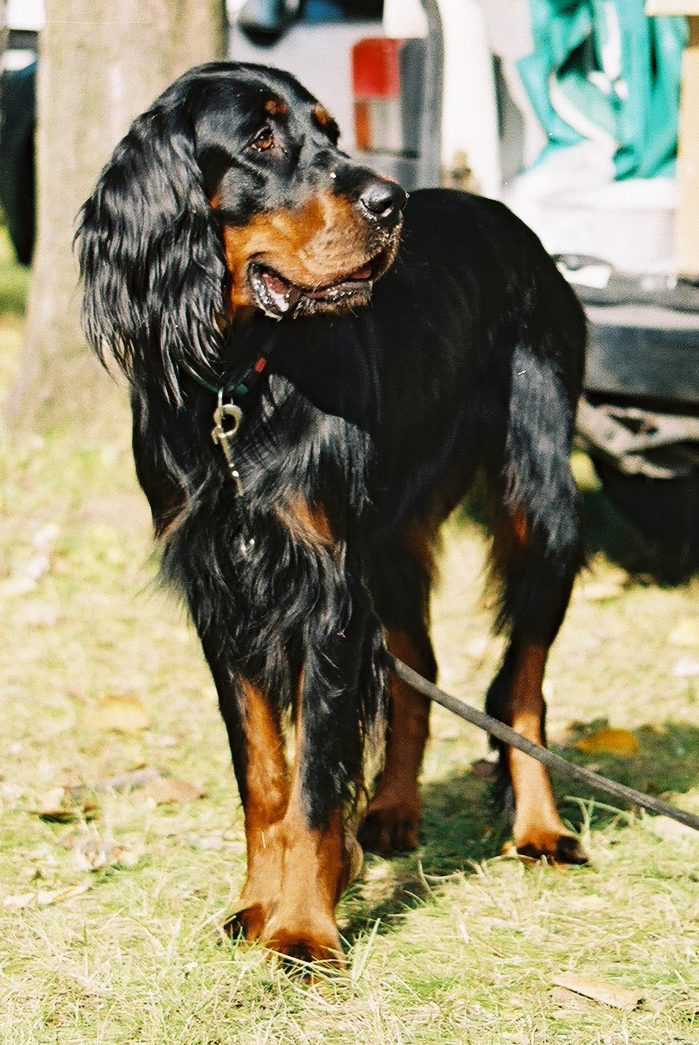
Gordon Setter

Domesticated Dogs Finding Their Game by Scent, But Not Killing It, Being Chiefly Used in Aid of the Gun"

— Stonehenge

Many of the gun dogs described by Stonehenge are no longer to be found in the United Kingdom or have been absorbed into one of the other breeds. The Russian Setter, the Welsh Setter, Northern Irish Water Spaniel, Southern Irish Water Spaniel and English Water Spaniel, the Spanish Pointer and the Portuguese Pointer have all disappeared in the past hundred and fifty years, and the pictures of some of the breeds that are still with us show considerable differences to the breed as we see them today.

Edward Laverick wrote in The Setter, published in 1872: "the setter is but an improved spaniel"; while the Rev Pearce in The Dog, published in the same year, said, 'he is a direct descendant of the Spaniel: "a Setting Spaniel" was the first Setter'. Since then this is the generally agreed with conclusion that the Setter was primarily derived from the old Land Spaniel, so called so as to distinguish it from the Water Spaniel. It is however likely that outside crosses with Hounds or Pointers did influence its development. William Taplin in The Sportsman's Cabinet (1803–04) maintained that it was "originally produced by a commixture between the Spanish pointer and the larger breed of the English spaniel".

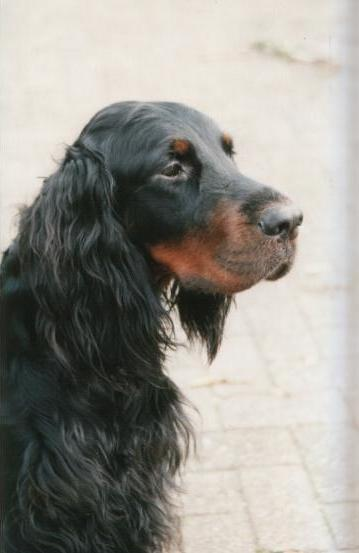
Gordon Setter portrait

We now really need not to go back to the Spaniel and its specialised development into the setting-dog, as it was called, and can be found in the work by the famous French sportsman, Gaston de Foix, Vicomte de Béarn (1331–91), who it is said owned about 1500 dogs 'brought from all countries of Europe' and was known as 'Gaston Phèbus' owing to his love for the chase. This work is called Livre de Chasse or Miroir de Phèbus, and was started in 1387. This work was the bases of The Master of Game written between 1406 and 1413 by Edward III's grandson, Edward, second Duke of York, who acknowledged his debt to de Foix. Below is the main passage referring to the Spaniel and the Setting-dog, as republished in 1904:

Another kind of dog is that is called falcon-dog or spaniel [espaignols in the French original] because it comes from Spain, notwithstanding that there are many in other countries....

A good spaniel should not be too rough, though his tail should be rough. The good qualities that such a dogs are these: They love well their masters and follow them without losing, although they be in a great crowd of men, and commonly they go before their master, running and wagging their tail, and raise or start fowl and wild beasts. But their right craft is of the partridge and of the quail. It is good for a man that has a noble goshawk, or a tierecel, or a sparrowhawk for the partridges to have such dogs; and also, when they are taught to be couchers (chiens couchants in the original French—ed.), they are good for taking partridge and quail with the net...

—Baillie-Grohman, p. 66

The modern Gordon Setter is a predominantly black dog with rich tan marking on the muzzle, legs and chest. A little bigger and heavier than either the Irish or English, he is nevertheless descended from the same genetic mixing pot, which undoubtedly has its origins among those setting spaniels we met earlier. The Kennel Club applied the name 'Gordon Setter' to the breed in 1924. Before that they were known as black and tan setters, and were found in many kennels beside those of the Alexander Gordon, 4th Duke of Gordon (1743–1827). Indeed, as we shall see, there is plenty of evidence that the majority of the setters at Gordon Castle during the Duke's time were tri-coloured rather than pure black and tan.

The breed was brought to the United States by George Blunt and Daniel Webster in 1842, with the purchase of two dogs named Rake and Rachel from the Duke's kennels. The American Kennel Club officially recognised the breed in 1892.

== Breed development ==
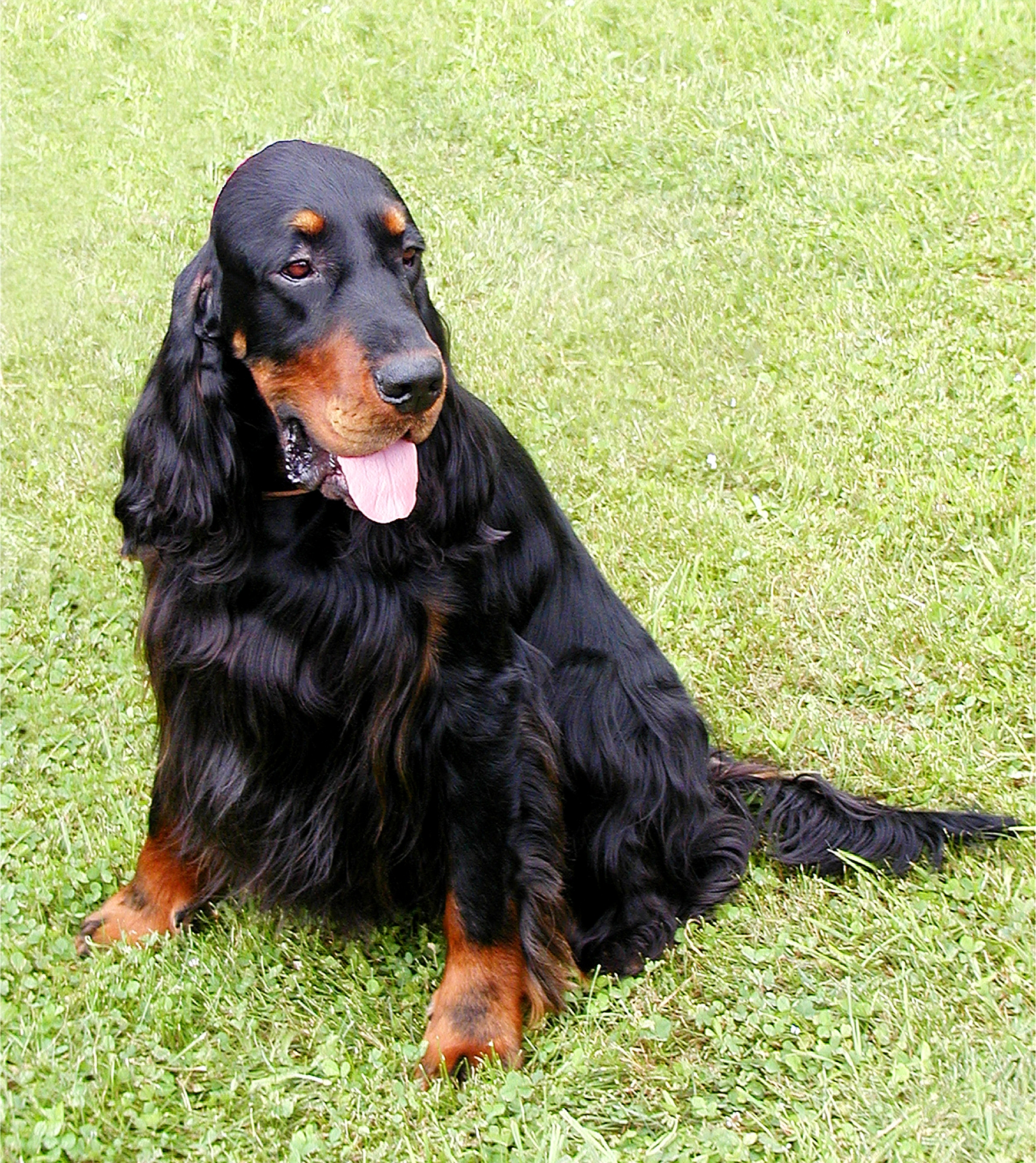
A Gordon Setter

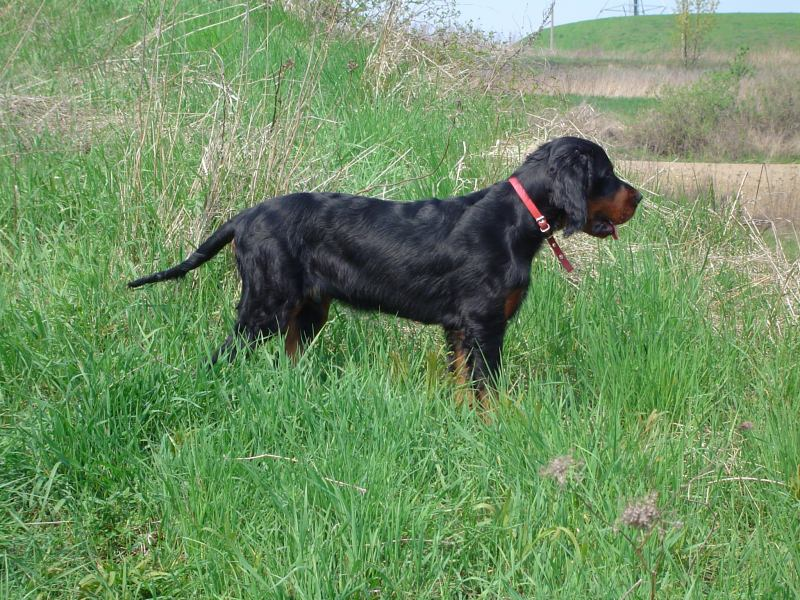
Gordon Setter puppy

=== As a gundog in Scotland and Northern England ===
Among the many changes which took place in sport and country affairs during the 20th century were those concerned with the method of shooting and consequent role of the gundog. These changes were accelerated after World War II, prior to which there were many "dogging moors" in the north of England and especially in Scotland. Walking up game became largely superseded by driving and field-craft by marksmanship. The function of the gundog was as a result limited to the recovery of dead or wounded birds and — in the age of specialisation — this meant that the Labrador Retriever came to the forefront while the number of working pointers and setters declined year after year.

Besides the modernisation of the style of shooting and the work required of gundogs, the situation was altered by the new developments that also took place in farming, which helped to bring about a marked reduction in the partridge population. Factors include the introduction of modernisation such as early cutting of silage, the use of fast-moving mechanical equipment, the burning or ploughing of stubble-fields soon after harvest, the destruction of hedgerows, and the use of chemical sprays for weed-killing. The hedgerows had provided shelter and nesting sites; the weeds and other herbage supplied food and cover; whilst the stubble-fields had been a primary source of winter food; so the partridges were deprived of some important assets, whilst the wide use of chemicals on the land exercised a direct harmful effect. These changes significantly affected the status of setters and pointers. Though often used as a general purpose gundog, the Gordon Setter has been a wide-ranging dog employed in the Scotland to locate red grouse and ptarmigan on the Scottish or North of England moors and partridges on the stubble-fields of the south of England. Up to the late 1930s, most Gordons were kept for this type of work, so that the majority were to be found in Scotland and the north of England; but now they are more evenly distributed and there are no large working kennels.

The function of the setter is well summarised by Captain Blaine:

The work required of the setter and pointer differs from that of all other breeds of dog. It is their business to range and hunt independently for game, at a distance from the sportsman, using their own initiative and intelligence to find it, and having done so, to remain staunchly “on point” awaiting his approach. They must search for the body, and not for the foot scent, and be able to maintain a fast steady gallop for long periods without fatigue. For the purpose a dog should have independence of character, speed, endurance, and a sensitive nose, combined with natural ability for hunting the terrain, in the best method of finding game.

Two Gordon Setters have achieved the title of Dual Champion. The Kennel Club regulations state this title can only be claimed by dogs who have achieved the title of Show Champion and Field Trial Champion. The first was a bitch, Amscot Irresista Belle; her pet name was Trisca. The second was Trisca's relative, Boyers Scarlatti.

=== Gordon Castle and other historically important kennels ===
Alexander, the 4th Duke of Gordon (1743–1827), established his kennel of Black and Tan Setters at Gordon Castle, which was situated near Fochabers, not far from the River Spey and a few miles from the coast of Moray. The exact date when this occurred is not known. A Colonel Thornton visited the place during his tour of the Highlands in 1786. He makes no mention of any kennel of Setters at that time, although he does note that "The Duke of Gordon still keeps up a diversion of falconry….I saw, also, here a true Highland greyhound, which is now become very scarce…." The Duke was indeed devoted to country pursuits and was among the last of his day in Scotland to keep hawks and practise falconry; he was celebrated for his Scottish Deerhounds as well as his Setters. However all that can be inferred from the Colonel's remarks is that there are unlikely to have been any Setters of note at the Castle in 1786.

There is much on record that seems reliable about the origin or derivation of the Duke of Gordon's Setters, though verification at this late date is of course impossible. Most of this evidence comes from Samuel Brown, the Veterinary Surgeon of Melton Mowbray, who was a great authority on the breed. In a letter to The Field in 1864, Samuel Brown stated:

An old gentleman sportsman, and one too who has shot over the same breed for 50 years and knew them during his boyhood, assures me that the late Duke of Gordon, Marquis of Anglesey, and several other noblemen, had their original stock of setters from the late Mr Coke of Longford, and that the colour was usually black-white-and-tan. Mine are descended from the original breed of Mr Coke, the Gordon ‘’Regent’’ and ‘’Fan’’, and within the last five years from a black-white-and–tan bitch which I got direct from the Beaudesart kennel (i.e. the Marquees of Anglesey's – Ed.).

Five years later, in another letter to the same journal, the Rev F. W. Adye wrote:

Mr Brown was told by Mr Coke himself that he often sent dogs to the Duke of Gordon and received others in exchange, in order now and then to obtain fresh blood.

These facts were well known to J. H. Walsh (‘Stonehenge’), Editor of The Field and a leading authority on sporting dogs, for it is he who mentions in the first chapter of his book The Dogs of the British Islands (1867) that a Setter "from Mr Coke of Norfolk and doubtless related to the late Duke of Gordon’s kennel, as Mr Coke and the duke bred together and interchanged setters frequently." Therefore, it does appear to be reasonably established that Mr Coke provided most of the original Setters for the Duke's kennel. The Rev Hutchinson, who wrote under the pseudonym ‘Sixty-one’, insisted that "the original setter taken or sent to Gordon Castle by the first Marquis of Anglesea", however what has been seen is that, according to Samuel Brown's ‘old gentleman sportsman’, the Marquees of Anglesey likewise had his original stock of Setters at Beaudesart from Mr Coke – probably, although this cannot be confirmed, some years before the Gordon Castle kennel was founded; for in 1869 the Beaudesart Setters were said to have been maintained ‘for sixty years pure and unmixed with any blood’. It is most unlikely that the Duke obtained his setters from only one source, we know that he interbreed with other kennels besides Mr Coke's, notably with Lord Lovat's.

Gordon Setters exercising

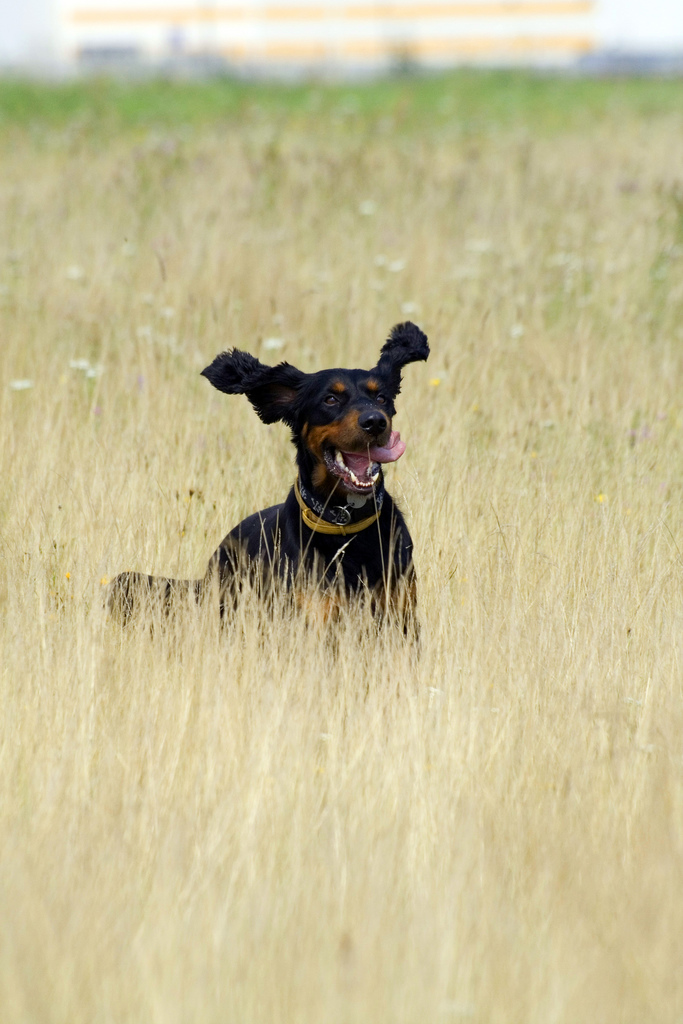
Gordon Setter running in the fields

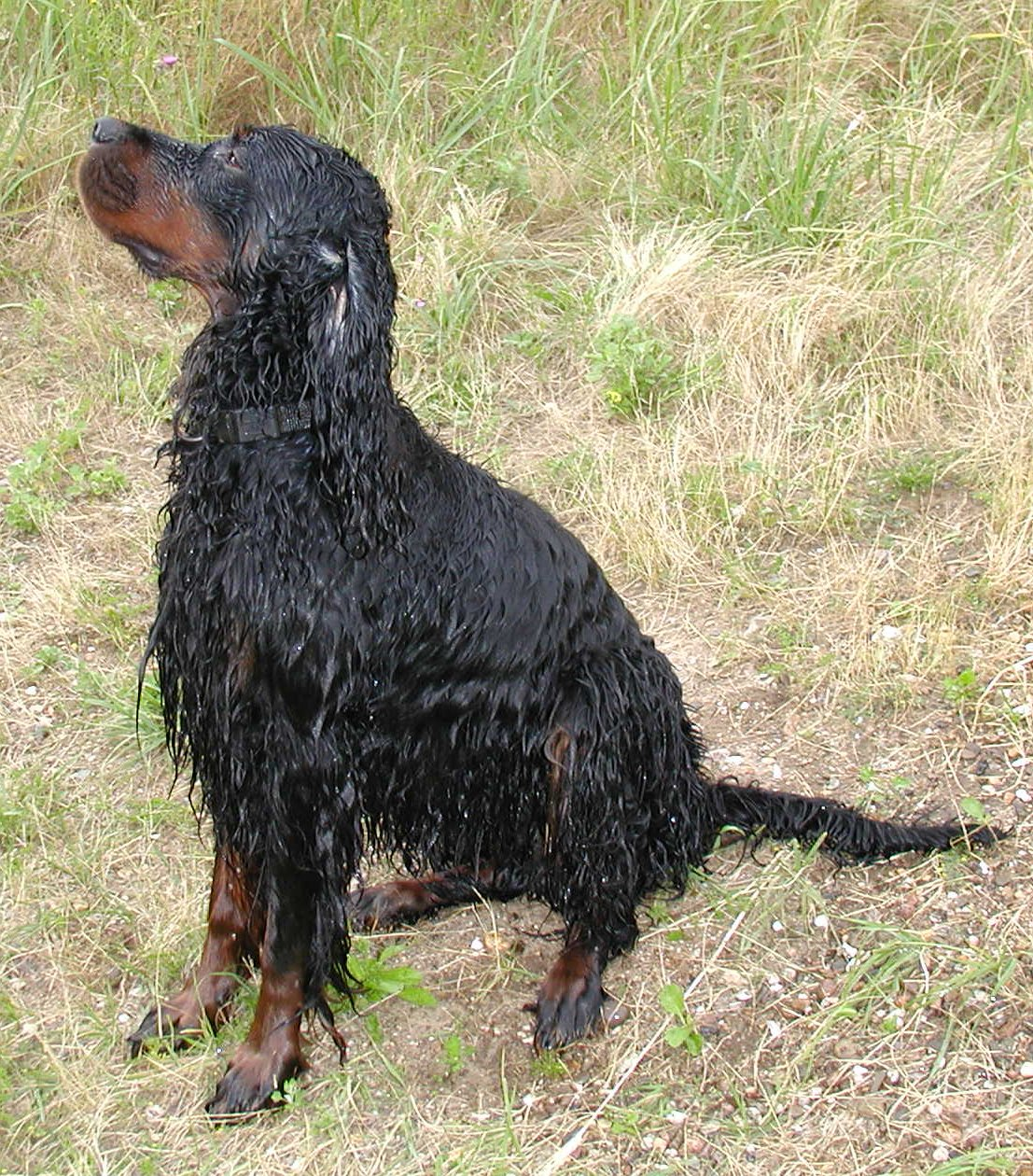
Gordon Setter after a bath

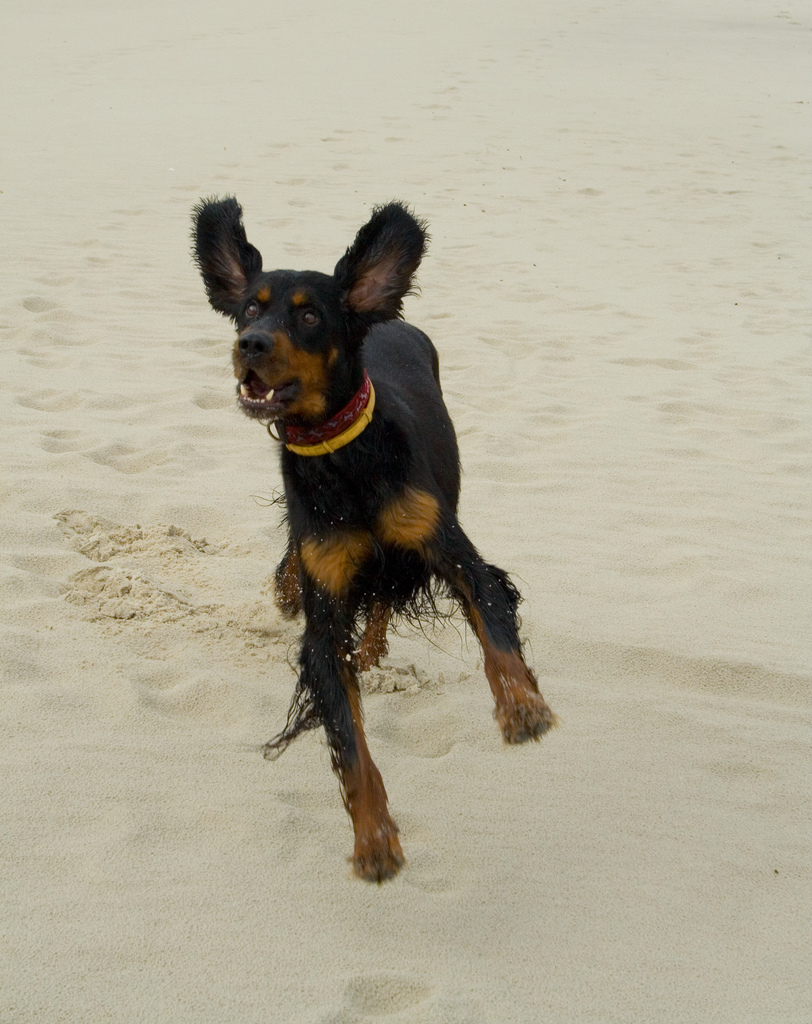
Gordon Setter running on the beach

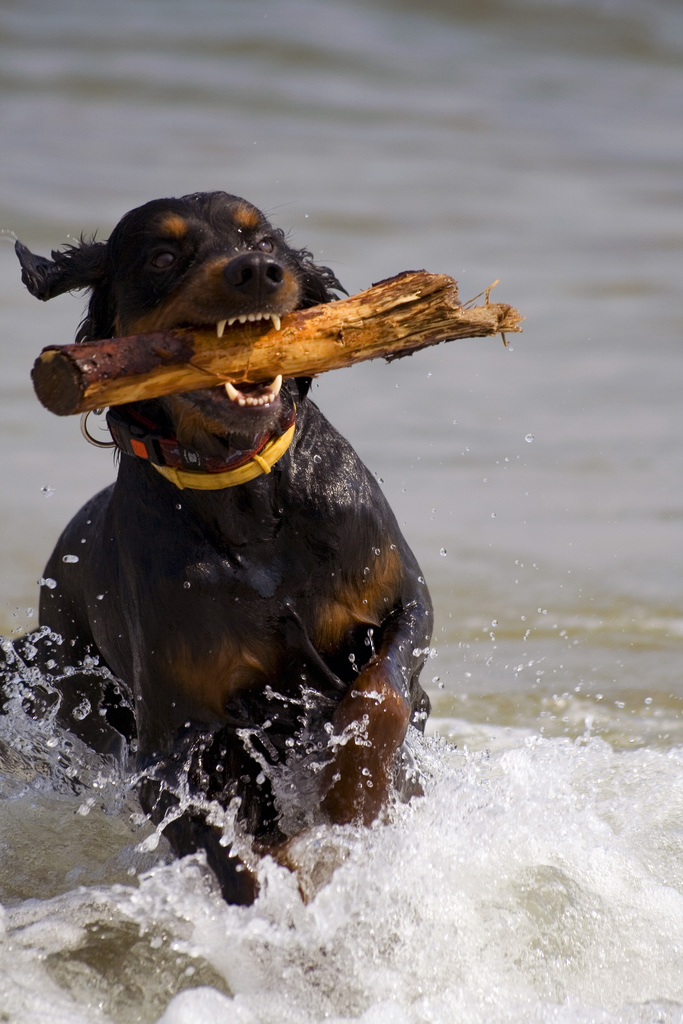
Gordon Setter retrieving a stick

== See also ==
- List of dog breeds
