= Pointing dog =

Hunting dog

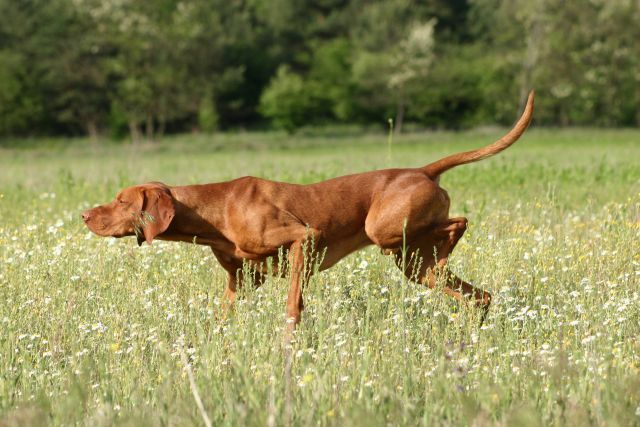
A Vizsla pointing

Pointing dogs, sometimes called bird dogs, are a type of gundog typically used in finding game. Gundogs are traditionally divided into three classes: retrievers, flushing dogs, and pointing breeds. The name pointer comes from the dog's instinct to point, by stopping and aiming its muzzle towards game. This demonstrates to the hunter the location of their quarry and allows them to move into gun range. Pointers were selectively bred from dogs who had abundant pointing and backing instinct. They typically start to acquire their hunting instincts at about 2 months of age.

== History ==
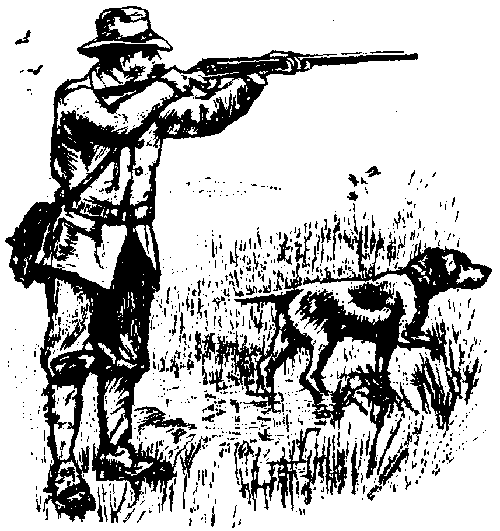
Pointer at the moment of flush

Pointing dogs may have descended from dogs from Spain, specifically of the Old Spanish Pointer (Furgus, 2002). Pointing dogs were originally used by hunters who netted the game. The dog would freeze or set (as in Setter) and allow the hunter to throw the net over the game before it flushed. Flushing dogs, on the other hand, were often used by falconers to flush game for the raptors.

The Westminster Kennel Club was organized in the early 1870s, and the club's early English import, "Sensation", is still used as the club logo.

The American Kennel Club was founded in 1884, and Pointers were among the first breeds registered with both the AKC and the Westminster Kennel Club. Over the years, the AKC has recognized many of the pointer breeds like the German Shorthaired Pointer in 1930 and the German Wirehaired Pointer in 1959. The AKC also developed training and testing programs for pointer breeds; these programs offer opportunities for both the dogs and the handlers to exhibit their skills. These tests for Pointers began in 1986, and the AKC Gun Dog Championships started up in 1993 - these Championships include Pointers along with other retrieving and non-retrieving dog breeds.

== Diversity ==
Sporting dogs from the British Isles are specialists, including the English Pointer, setters which are now used as pointers, and the flushing spaniels and retrievers neither of which naturally stop before their quarry reacts. By contrast, continental Europe has only two categories, the water dogs whose hunting style overlaps with that of flushing spaniels and retrievers, and the continental pointing breeds, most of which are classified as versatile gun dog breeds or sometimes HPR breeds (for hunt, point, and retrieve). The oldest continental breeds are versatile due to lack of specialization; whereas newer continental breeds are versatile intentionally beginning in the latter half of the 19th century. Both old and new continental breeds tend to perform each specific task less effectively than the specialists of the British Isles, but the hunter is able to pursue a wider variety of game with the same companion at his side. The North American Versatile Hunting Dog Association defines versatility as "the dog that is bred and trained to dependably hunt and point game, to retrieve on both land and water, and to track wounded game on both land and water." As an example, German Shorthaired Pointers are often used to retrieve birds (i.e., duck hunting), whereas calling upon a Pointer to do the same would be less common. Unlike the pure pointing and setting breeds, many versatile dogs were bred for working in dense cover, and traditionally have docked tails.

Pointing dogs come in short, long, and wire coats to work in different environments. The short coat has the best heat tolerance, stays clean, dries off quickly after swimming, and protects the dog from overheating during endurance work (tracking). The long coat has the best cold tolerance, but can become muddy or tangled with burrs. The wire coat provides good protection from wet or harsh vegetation. Most breeds are liver brown and/or piebald with ticking/roaning. The Weimaraner stands out in solid grey, as do the orange falconry breeds Vizslas and Portuguese Pointer.

== Breeds ==
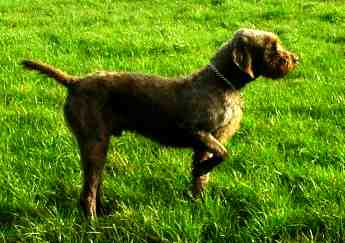
A Pudelpointer in pointing stance

British and Irish pointers and setters include the following breeds:

- English Setter
- Gordon Setter
- Irish Red and White Setter
- Irish Setter
- Pointer

Continental-type pointers are more versatile hunting dogs. While they all point or set, their natural abilities for and traditional training towards tracking, flushing and retrieving vary from one breed to the next:

- Ariège Pointer
- Bracco Italiano
- Braque d'Auvergne
- Braque du Bourbonnais
- Braque Dupuy (extinct)
- Braque Français (two sizes: larger type Gascogne and Braque Français and smaller type Pyrénées)
- Braque Saint-Germain
- Brittany
- Burgos Pointer
- Český Fousek
- French Spaniel
- German Longhaired Pointer
- German Roughhaired Pointer
- German Shorthaired Pointer
- German Wirehaired Pointer
- Large Münsterländer
- Labrador Retriever
- Old Danish Pointer
- Pachón Navarro
- Perdigueiro Galego
- Portuguese Pointer
- Pudelpointer
- Slovak Rough-haired Pointer
- Small Münsterländer
- Spinone Italiano
- Stabyhoun
- Vizsla
- Weimaraner
- Wirehaired Pointing Griffon
- Wirehaired Vizsla

== See also ==
- List of dog breeds
- Old Spanish Pointer, an extinct dog believed to be the first pointing breed

== General bibliography ==
- Fergus, Charles. Gun Dog Breeds: A Guide to Spaniels, Retrievers, and Pointing Dogs, The Lyons Press, 2002. ISBN 1-58574-618-5.
