= Wirehaired Vizsla =

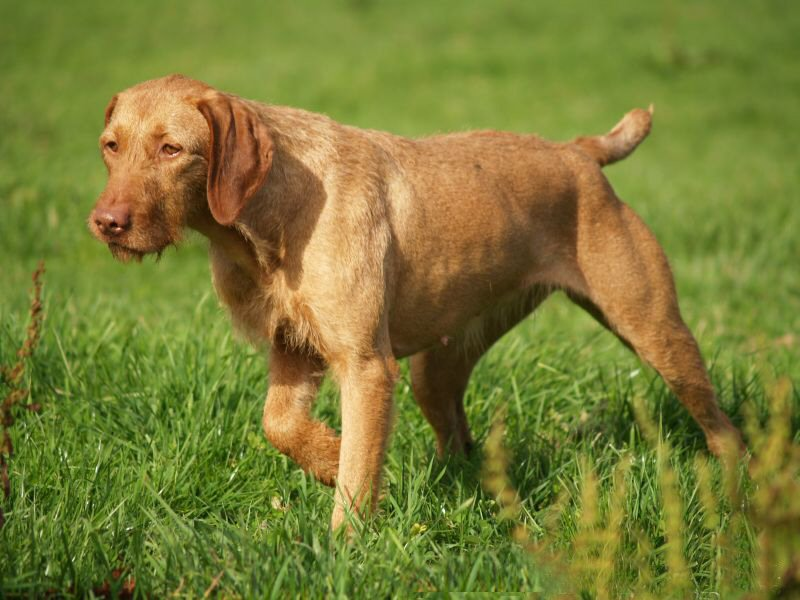
- Other names: Drótszőrű magyar vizsla; Hungarian Wire-Haired Pointer; Hungarian Wire-Haired Vizsla
- Origin: Hungary
- Foundation stock: Vizsla; German Wirehaired Pointer
Traits
Height	Males	58–64 cm (23–25 in)
	Females	54–60 cm (21–24 in)
Kennel club standards
- Fédération Cynologique Internationale: standard

The Hungarian Wirehaired Vizsla (Note: /ˈviːʃlə/ VEESH-lə; Hungarian: [ˈviʒlɒ]) (Hungarian: Drótszőrű magyar vizsla) or Hungarian Wirehaired Pointer is a Hungarian breed of pointer dog.

It is a versatile hunting dog that was traditionally and currently used to hunt, point, and retrieve, referring to the dog's natural ability in tracking, pointing, and retrieving game.

== History ==
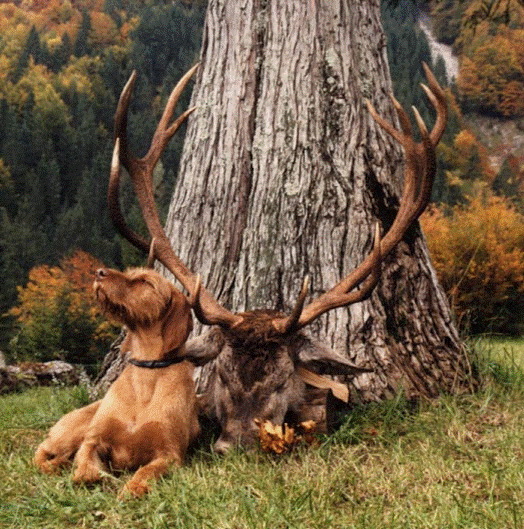
With game

The Hungarian Wirehaired Vizsla is a completely separate breed from the more commonly known shorthaired Vizsla. The Wirehaired Vizsla was developed in the 1930s, initially by Vasas Jozsef, owner of the Csabai vizsla kennel along with Gresznarik Laszlo, who owned the de Selle German Wirehaired Pointer kennel. Their aim was to produce a dog that combined the color of the Vizsla with a heavier coat, and a more substantial frame, better suited for working in cold weather and retrieving from icy water.

Two Vizsla bitches (Zsuzsi and Csibi), both of whom combined excellent pedigrees with good working ability, were selected to breed with a totally liver colored German Wirehaired Pointer sire (Astor von Potat). Zsuzsi's sire was known to have offspring with longer coats. The best of Zsuzsi's and Csibi's offspring were selected and bred together and Dia de Selle, the first WHV to be exhibited, was born. She had the same body as the shorthaired vizsla, but her head was the shape of the German Wirehaired Pointer. While her coat was not rough and thick enough, she was the promising beginning of the creation of the new breed.

After Jozef and Laszlo, Koloman Slimák worked on creating a Wirehaired Vizsla in Slovakia. It is suggested that he added infusion of Irish Setter and Pointer in addition to German Wirehaired Pointer into his own line of smooth-haired Vizslas. Other anecdotal evidence suggests that Pudelpointer, Bloodhound and Irish Setter blood were added during the period of the Second World War when many other Hungarian kennels became involved in the development of the breed. It has also previously, but incorrectly been suggested that the breed was created by backbreeding of smooth Vizsla's most heavily coated offspring.

In 2009, there were approximately 400-450 Wirehaired Vizslas in the US and between 2,500 and 3,000 worldwide.

=== Recognition ===
The Wire-haired Vizsla was recognized in Europe by the Fédération Cynologique Internationale under the Hungarian standard in 1963 as the Drótszőrű Magyar Vizsla. Introduced to North America in the 1970s, the breed was first recognized by the Canadian Kennel Club in 1977 and North American Versatile Hunting Dog Association in 1986. The breed was recognized by the United Kennel Club in 2006. It was recognized by the Australian National Kennel Council in 2007.

The breed was admitted into AKC's Foundation Stock Service Program in 2008. Effective January 1, 2009, the Wirehaired Vizsla became eligible to compete in AKC Companion and Performance events. The Wirehaired Vizsla was permitted to show in conformation in the AKC Miscellaneous Class starting January 1, 2011. They joined the Sporting Group and became a fully recognized breed on July 2, 2014.

The breed is also recognized in North America by the American Rare Breed Association and the Field Dog Stud Book registries.

== Characteristics ==
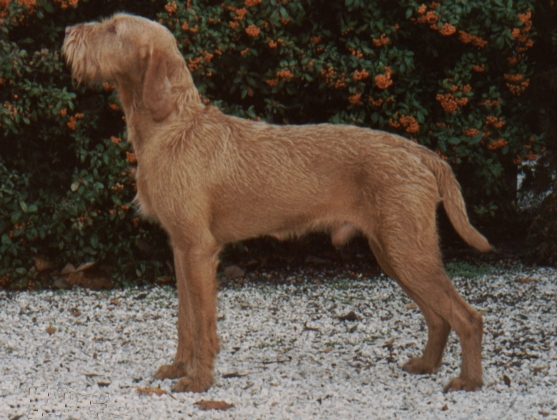

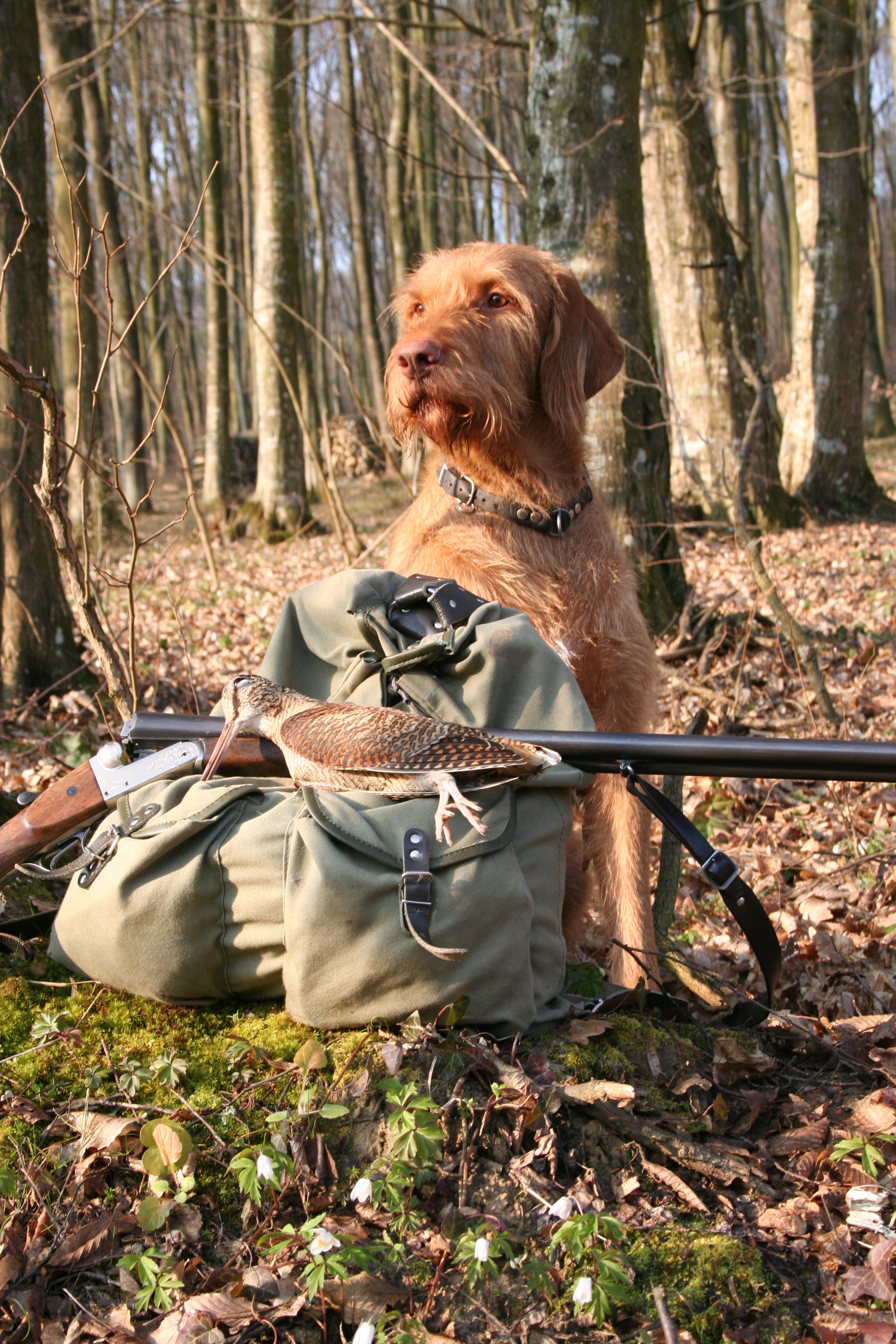
With gun and game

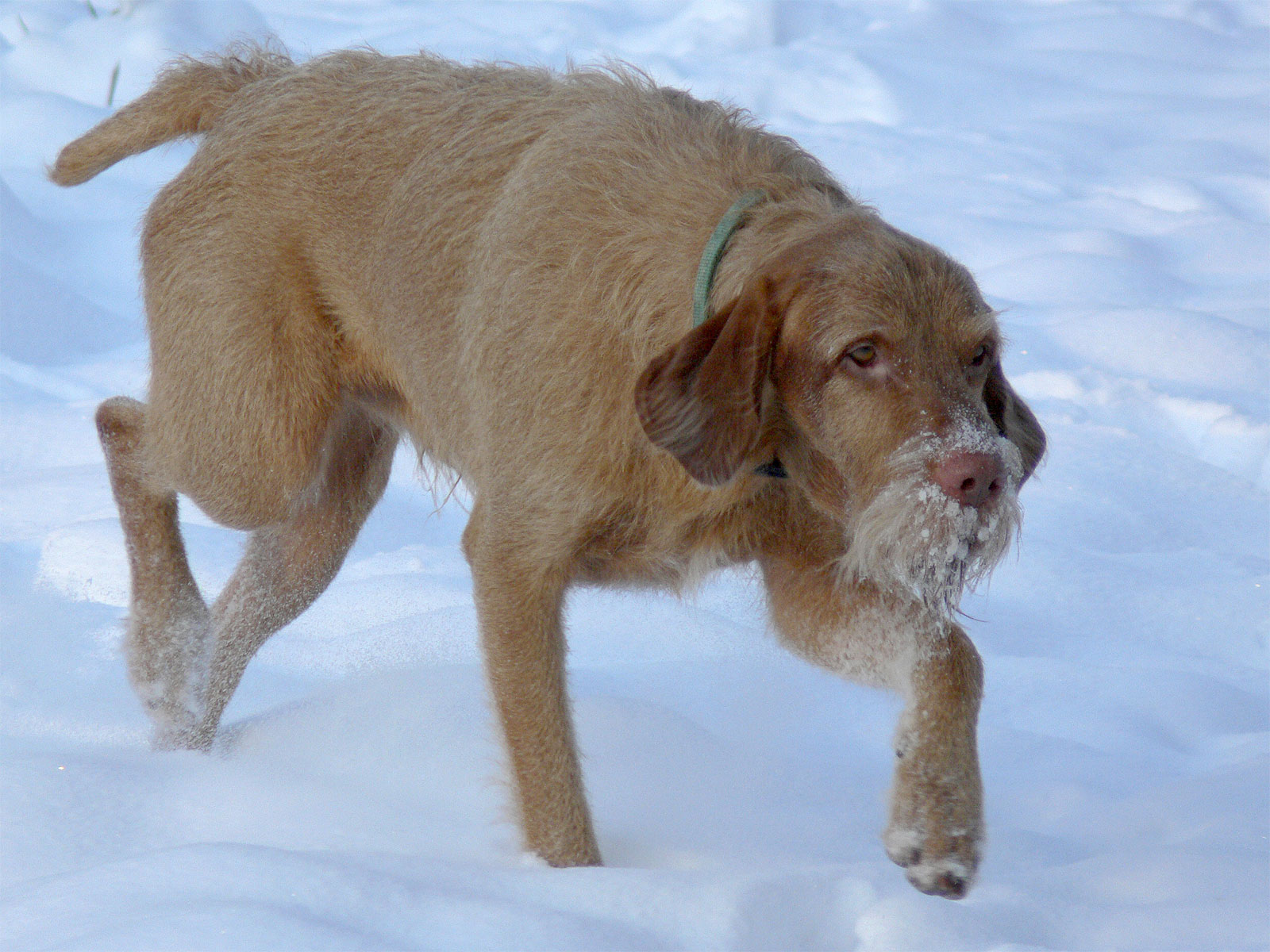

The Wirehaired Vizsla is of medium size, with the withers height for dogs usually in the range 58 to 64 cm and that for bitches some 4 cm less.

=== Temperament ===
The Wirehaired Vizsla is often viewed as an affectionate breed that bonds well with people.

The breed has a level personality making them suited for families.

== Health ==
A survey of UK breed club members found a life expectancy of 12.92 years from a sample of 38 deaths.
