= Griffon (dog type) =

Dog type

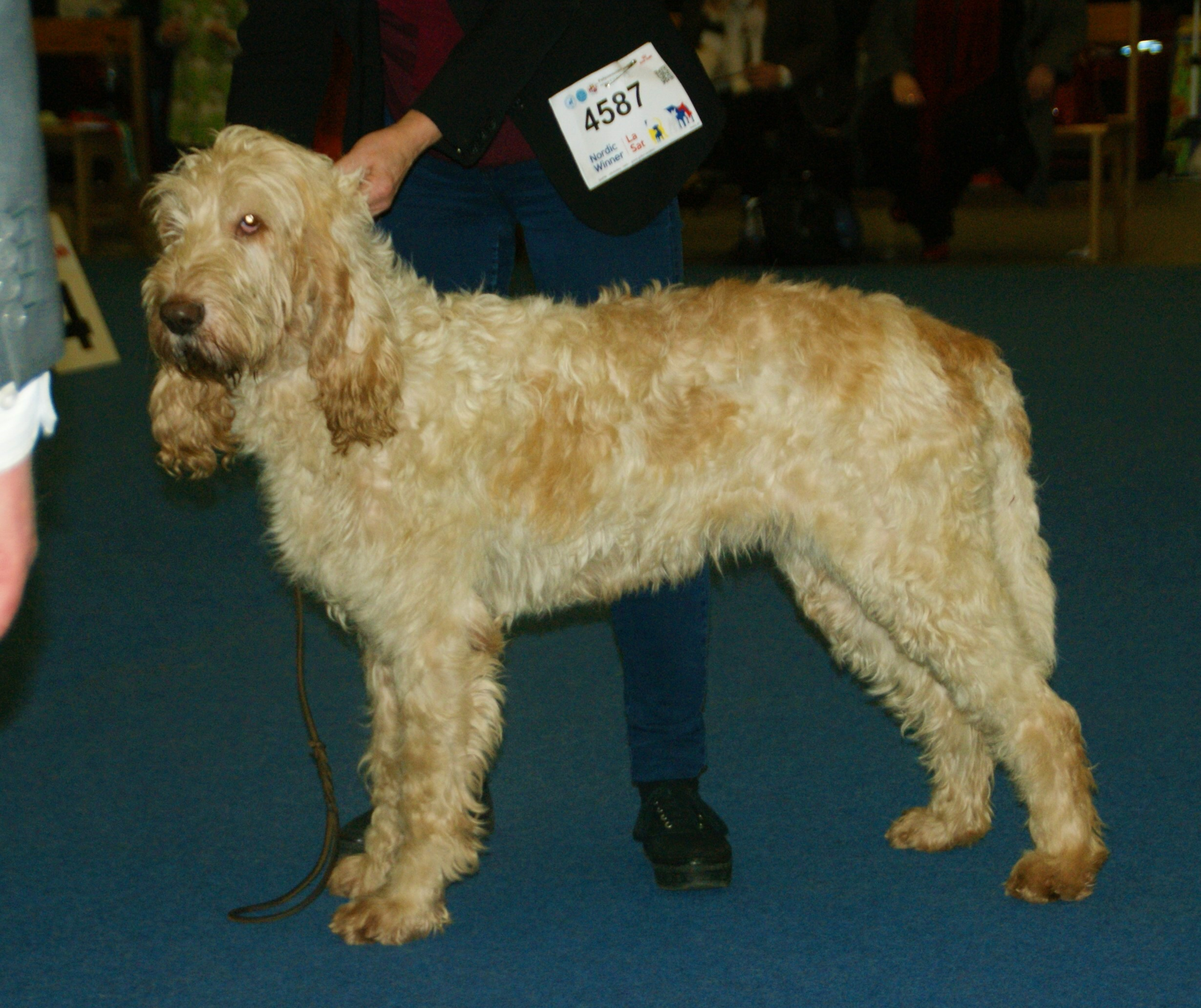
- Large Vendéen Griffon Grand Griffon Vendéen
Traits
- Coat: Rough, wire-haired

Griffon is a type of dog, a collection of breeds that were originally hunting dogs. There are three lines of the griffon type recognized by the Fédération Cynologique Internationale (FCI): the Griffon Vendéens, the wirehaired pointers, and the smousje (Belgian companion dogs or Dutch Smoushond). The griffon type is characterized by rough- or wire-hair.

The griffon is mentioned as early as Xenophon. The hounds, Canis Segusius, used by the Gauls were griffons. Among the oldest breeds are the Italian Wirehaired Pointing Dog or Spinone Italiano (FCI #165) and the breeds bred by Eduard Karel Korthals originating in the Low Countries (Belgium, Netherlands, northern France) which have a short, bearded muzzle. The smousje, a small dog mentioned since the Middle Ages in the Low Countries known for its firm, even temperament and rough coat, was the initial breeding stock for the Brussels Griffon.

== Griffon breeds ==
=== Scenthounds ===
Scenthounds (FCI Group 6, Section 1)

- large size, long hair
  - Grand Griffon Vendéen
- medium size, coarse hair
  - Briquet Griffon Vendéen
  - Griffon Bleu de Gascogne
  - Griffon Fauve de Bretagne
  - Griffon Nivernais
- small size
  - Grand Basset Griffon Vendéen
  - Petit Basset Griffon Vendéen
  - Basset Fauve de Bretagne

=== Pointers ===
Pointers (FCI Group 7, Section 1)

- Spinone Italiano or Italian Griffon (FCI #165)
  - White-orange Spinone Italiano
  - Chestnut-roan Spinone Italiano
- Wirehaired Pointing Griffon or Korthals Griffon or French Wirehaired Pointing Griffon (FCI #107)
- Český Fousek or Bohemian Wirehaired Pointing Griffon (FCI #245)
- Slovak Rough-haired Pointer or Slovakian Wiredhaired Pointer or Slovenský Ohař Hrubosrstý or Slovenský Hrubosrsty Stavac (Ohar) (FCI #320)
- German Wirehaired Pointer or Deutsch Drahthaar (FCI #98)
- Drótszőrű Magyar Vizsla or Wirehaired Vizsla or Hungarian Wirehaired Pointer (Vizsla) (FCI #239)
- Stichelhaar or German Roughhaired Pointer

=== Companion/Toy Dogs ===
Small Belgian Companion Dogs, "Smousje" (FCI Group 9, Section 3)

- Brussels Griffon or Griffon Bruxellois (FCI #80)
- Belgian Griffon or Griffon Belge (FCI #81)
- Brabancon Griffon or Petit Brabançon (FCI #82) - has a short smooth coat

== See also ==
- List of dog breeds
