= Korthals =

Korthals may refer to:

== Things ==
The dog, the Korthals Griffon, known as the Wirehaired Pointing Griffon

== People ==
- Benk Korthals (b. 1944), Dutch politician
- Frits Korthals Altes (1931–2025), Dutch politician and jurist
- Pieter Willem Korthals (1807–1892), Dutch botanist in the Dutch East Indies
- Hendrik Albertus Korthals (1911–1976), liberal Dutch politician
- Eduard Karel Korthals (1851–1896), Dutch dog breeder
- Robert W. Korthals, Canadian banker, president Toronto-Dominion Bank
