= Fousek =

Fousek (feminine: Fousková) is a Czech surname. The word fousek is a diminutive of fous, meaning "a hair of the beard". Notable people with the surname include:

- Adam Fousek (born 1994), Czech footballer
- Miroslav Fousek (1923–1993), Czech racecar driver
- Petr Fousek (born 1972), Czech footballer
- Vít Fousek Jr. (born 1940), Czech cross-country skier
- Vít Fousek Sr. (1913–1990), Czech cross-country skier

== See also ==
- Český Fousek, Czech dog breed
