= Bulgarian Hound =

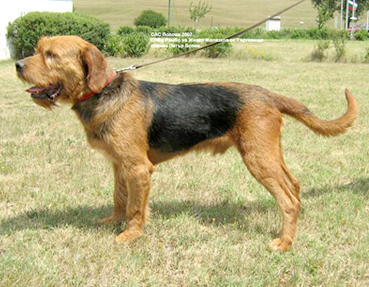
- Male Bulgarian Hound
- Other names: Barak
- Origin: Bulgaria
Traits
Height	Males	53-58 cm
	Females	48-53 cm
Weight	Males	23-27 kg
	Females	19-22 kg
Kennel club standards
- BRFK: standard

The Bulgarian Hound (Bulgarian: Български барак, Balgarski Barak), also known as the Barak, is a hunting breed from Bulgaria. This breed is prevalent in the north, northwestern and central regions of Bulgaria. Its closest relative is the Slovak Rough-haired Pointer.

== Breed standard ==
The Barak belongs to the lineage of long-haired hounds first described by F.Laszka in 1905, and is the only long-haired hound breed in this region.

The Bulgarian Hound breed standard of the Bulgarian Republican Federation of Cynology places this dog in group 6 - "Scenthounds and similar breeds", section 1.2 - "Medium-sized scenthounds". The breed is not recognized by FCI.

The Bulgarian Hound is a scenthound with medium height. Its body is balanced, strong, with a rectangular outline. The coarse coat is yellow-rufous coloured in various shades, halm yellow or dark rufous. The coat can be in one colour or combined with grey or black-grey in the middle part of the body. Some white spots are acceptable in definite places.

== Lineage ==
In 2020, a mitochondrial DNA study found that a dog specimen found in the Bronze Age town of Via Ordiere, Solarolo, Italy dated to 3,600–3,280 years ago shared a DNA sequence (haplotype) that is found in the Bulgarian Hound. Additionally, almost all of the ancient Bulgarian specimens in the study shared haplotypes with ancient Italian samples.

== See also ==
- List of dog breeds
- Bulgarian Scenthound (native Bulgarian dog)
- Karakachan dog (native Bulgarian dog)
