= Braque Saint-Germain =

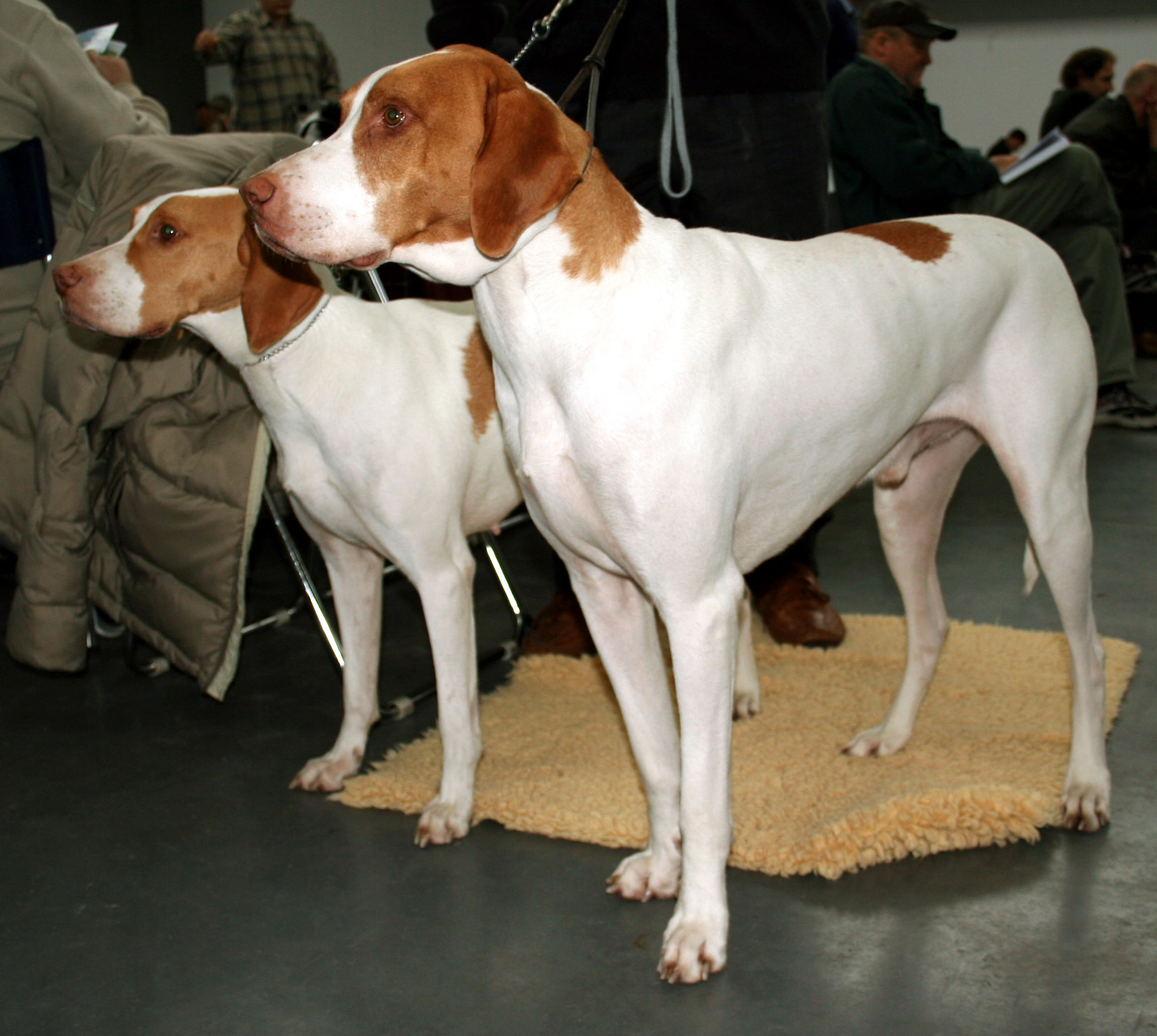
- Braque Saint-Germain
- Other names: Saint Germain Pointer
Traits
Height	Males	56–62 cm (22–24 in)
	Females	54–59 cm (21–23 in)
- Coat: Short, not too fine.
- Colour: Dull white with orange (fawn) markings
Kennel club standards
- Société Centrale Canine: standard
- Fédération Cynologique Internationale: standard

The Braque Saint-Germain (translated into English as the St. Germain Pointing Dog) is a medium-large breed of dog, a versatile hunter used for hunting as a gun dog and pointer as well as for hunting other small game. Braque is a term meaning pointing dogs. The breed was created around 1830 by crossing English and French pointing type dogs.

== Appearance ==
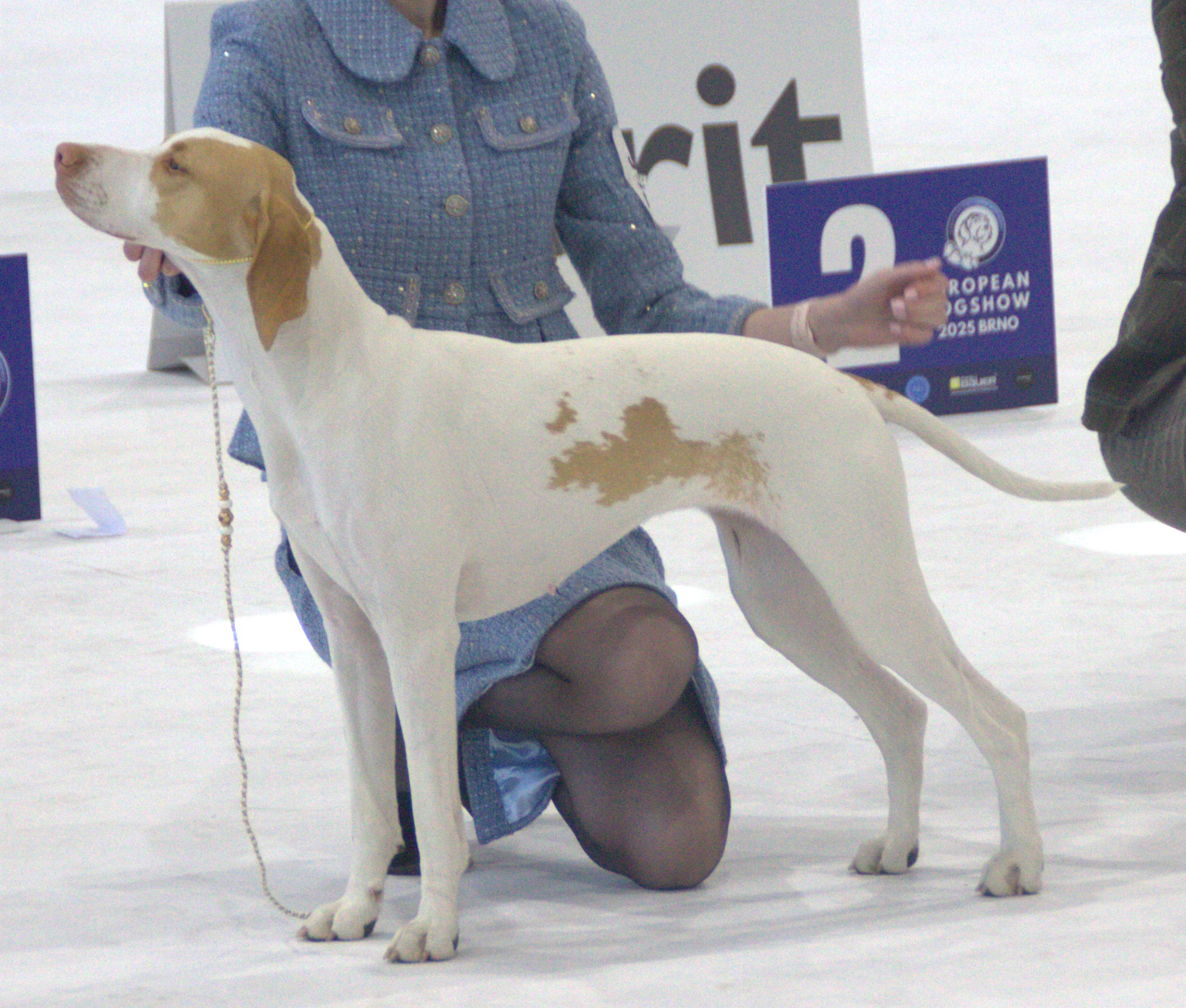
Saint-Germain Pointer in an international show.

A typical pointer, with a medium build and an attractive fawn and white coat, drop ears, and a long tail which is held level while the dog is working. The Braque Saint-Germain stands 56–62 centimetres (22–24 in) at the withers, females somewhat smaller.

== History ==
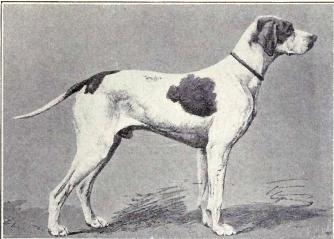
Pointer of Saint-Germain circa 1915

Bred first in the royal kennels at Compiègne around 1830 from a mix of English and Continental pointers, the breed grew in fame in Saint Germain en Laye, where it received its name. Although a popular hunting dog, the breed achieved its greatest fame as a showdog. Starting from the first dog show in France in 1863, it was the most shown pointing breed. The French breed club was established in 1913. The breed is recognised internationally by the Fédération Cynologique Internationale in Group 7, Pointing Dogs, Section 1.1 Continental Type Pointing Dog. It is also recognised in North America by the United Kennel Club as of 2006. The breed is also recognized by a number of minor registries, hunting clubs and internet-based dog registry businesses and promoted as a rare breed for those seeking unique pets.

== Health and temperament ==
Its temperament is described in the breed standard as having a soft mouth (for retrieving without damaging game) and being a "hunter above all" that appreciates living with people.

== See also ==
- List of dog breeds
