= Old Danish Pointer =

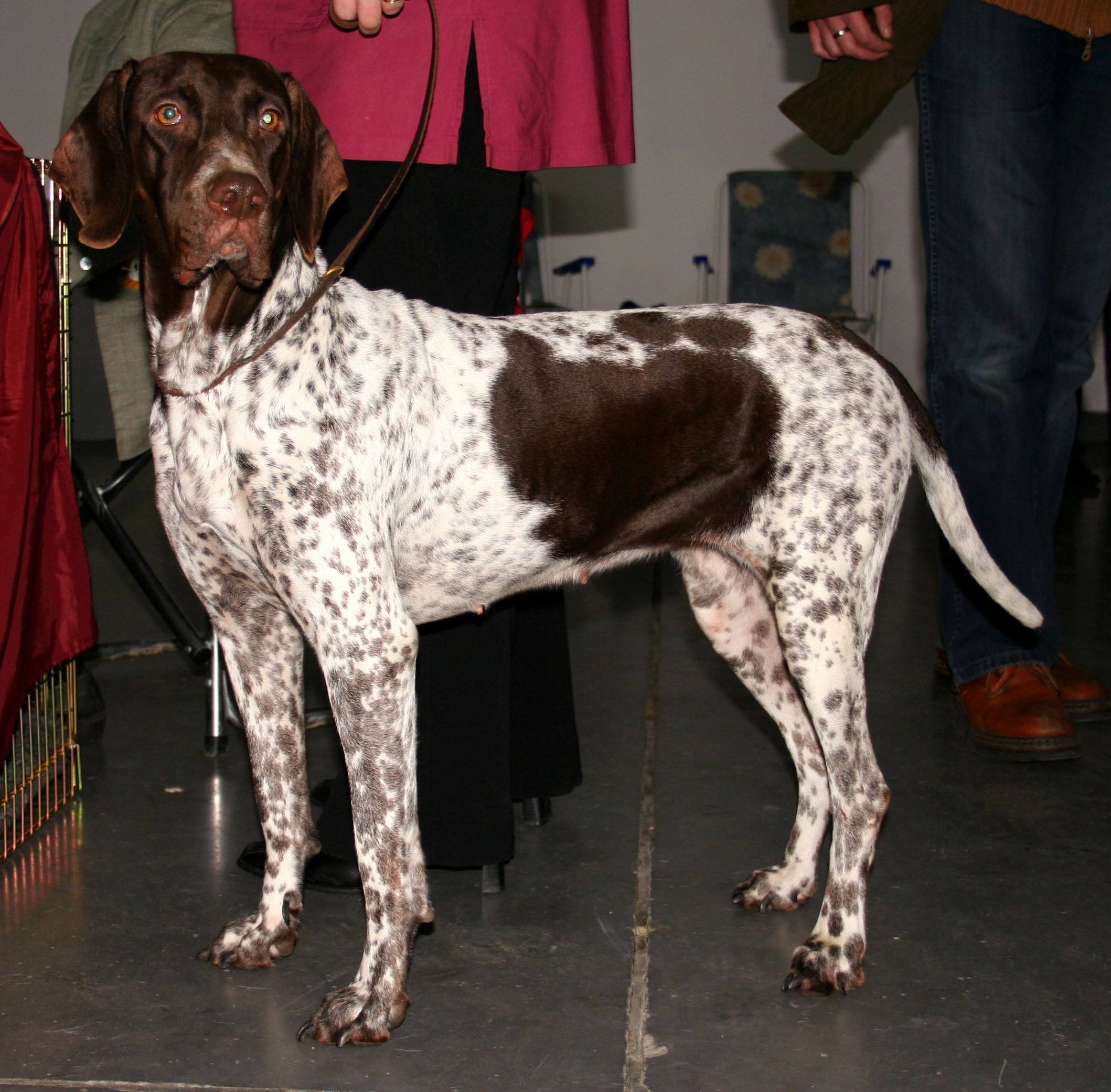
- Old Danish Pointer
- Other names: Gammel Dansk Hønsehund; Old Danish Bird Dog
- Origin: Denmark
Kennel club standards
- Dansk Kennel Club: standard
- Fédération Cynologique Internationale: standard

The Old Danish Pointer is a medium-sized breed of dog, white with brown markings, originally used as a pointing dog in Denmark.

== Description ==
=== Appearance ===
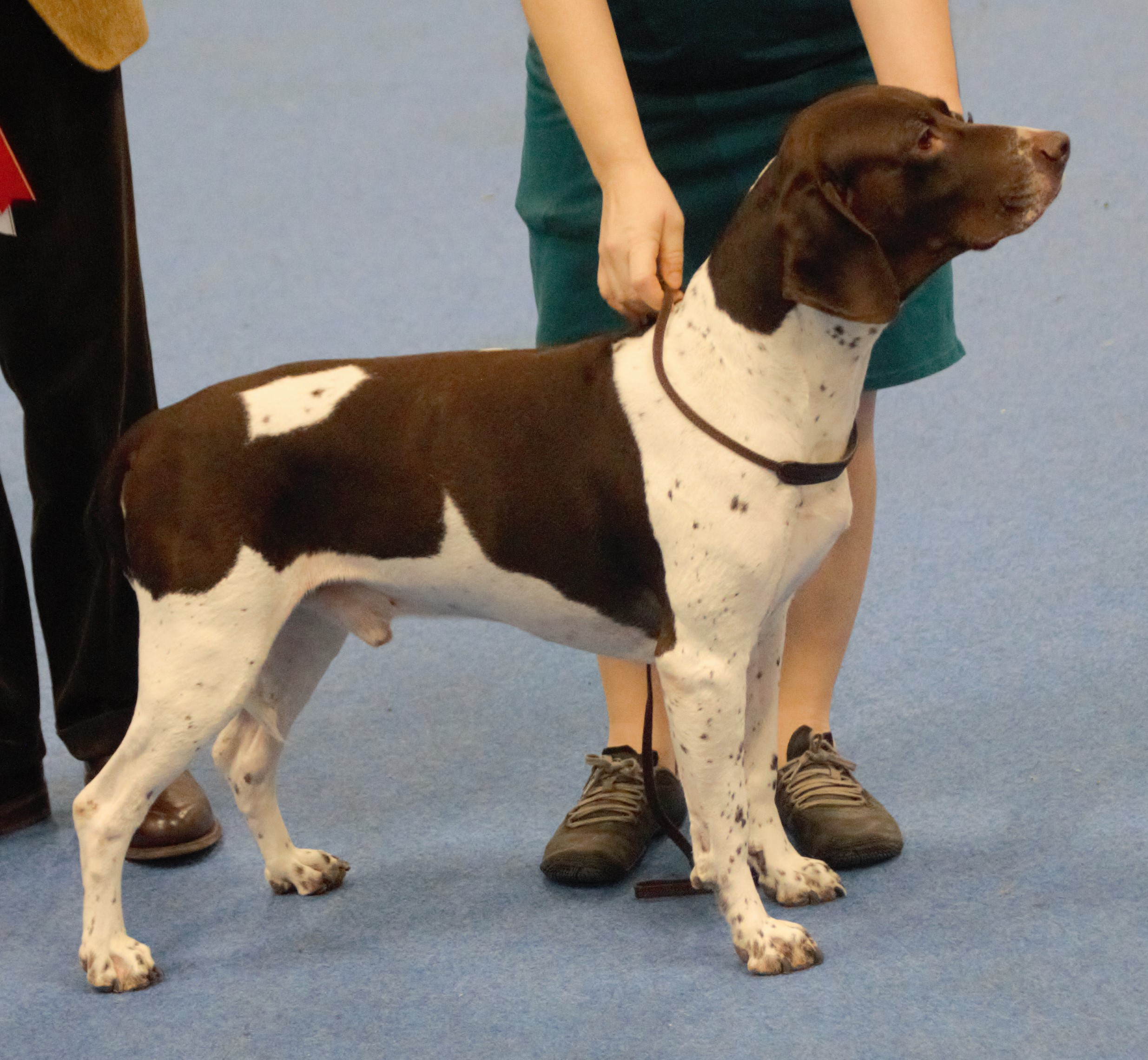
Old Danish Pointer in a show.

Old Danish Pointers (Danish: gammel dansk hønsehund, translated "Old Danish Fowl-Dog") are strongly built. One of the most charming features of the breed is the great difference between male and female. While the dog is powerful and substantial, the female is characterized by being lighter, more spirited, and capricious.

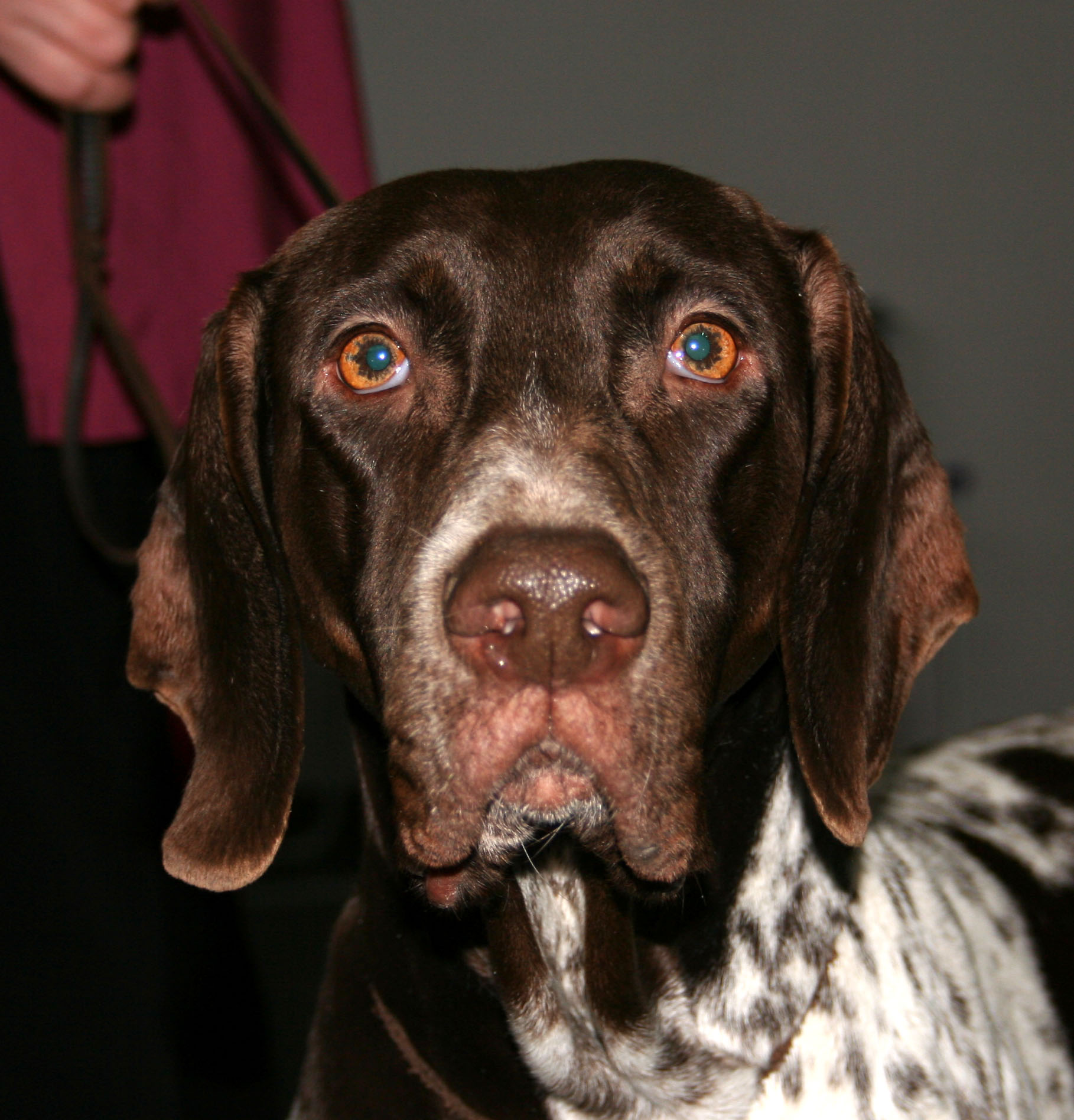
Head of Old Danish Pointer

- Height at the withers:
  - Male 54–60 cm (21–24 in), above 56 cm (22 in) preferred.
  - Female 50–56 cm (20–22 in), above 52 cm (20 in) preferred.
- Weight:
  - Male 30–35 kg (66–77 lb)
  - Female 26–31 kg (57–68 lb)

=== Temperament ===
Conveys the impression of a quiet and stable dog showing determination and courage. During the hunt, the dog progresses rather slowly, always maintaining contact with the hunter and accomplishing its task as a pointing dog without creating unnecessary disturbance of the ground. The breed is suited for small as well as large hunting grounds. The name has nothing to do with temperament, but refers to its ability to point out birds of the order Galliformes and specifically birds belonging to the family Phasianidae. Commonly referred to in Danish as Hen birds/Chicken birds. The often used English name, "Old Danish Chicken Dog" is therefore incorrect or at best badly translated.

This is a friendly family dog, as long as it gets its exercise. It is fast and active outdoors and quiet indoors, but is not suitable for apartments or small yards.

== History ==
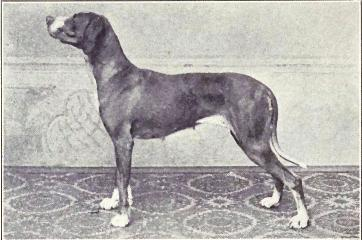
Danish Pointer circa 1915

The Danish Pointer dates back to the 17th Century and descends from the Spanish Pointer.

In April 2026, the Old Danish Pointer was added to the American Kennel Club Foundation Stock Service (FSS).

== See also ==
- List of dog breeds
