= Braque d'Auvergne =

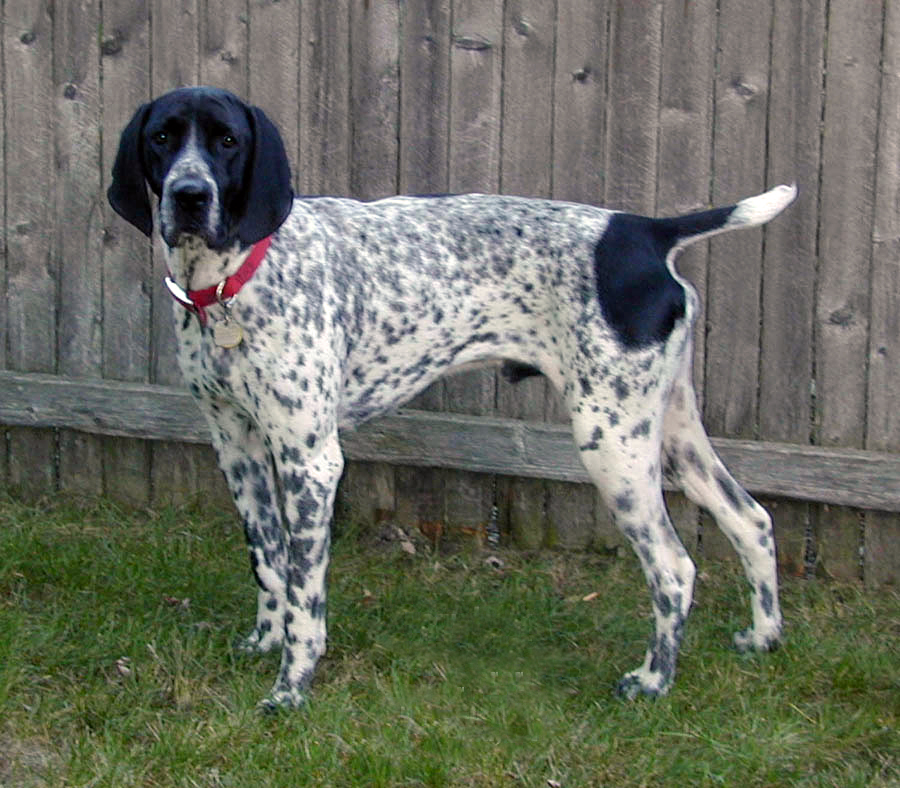
- A male Braque d'Auvergne
- Other names: Auvergne Pointer; Bleu d'Auvergne
- Origin: France
Traits
Height	Males	55–65 cm (22–26 in)
	Females	51–61 cm (20–24 in)
- Coat: Short
- Colour: Black with white markings
Kennel club standards
- Société Centrale Canine: standard
- Fédération Cynologique Internationale: standard

The Braque d'Auvergne is a breed of dog originating in the mountain area of Cantal, in the historic Auvergne province in the mid-south of France. It is a pointer and versatile gundog. The breed descends from ancient regional types of hunting dogs.

== Appearance ==
The Braque d'Auvergne is a strong, substantial dog, between 53–63 centimetres (21–25 in) at the withers. It has a large head, long ears, and pendulous lips. The tail was traditionally docked to half its length. The short, glossy coat is white with mottling of black that gives a blue impression, and large black spots. The head and ears are always black.

== Temperament ==
Intelligent and good natured, it is used as a hunting dog as well as a family pet.

== History ==
The Auvergne pointer has been present in the Cantal region for more than two centuries and was recognized as a French gundog breed with an FCI breed standard in 1955. It was recognised by the Kennel Club (UK) with effect from 1 April 2016.

== See also ==
- List of dog breeds
