= German Roughhaired Pointer =

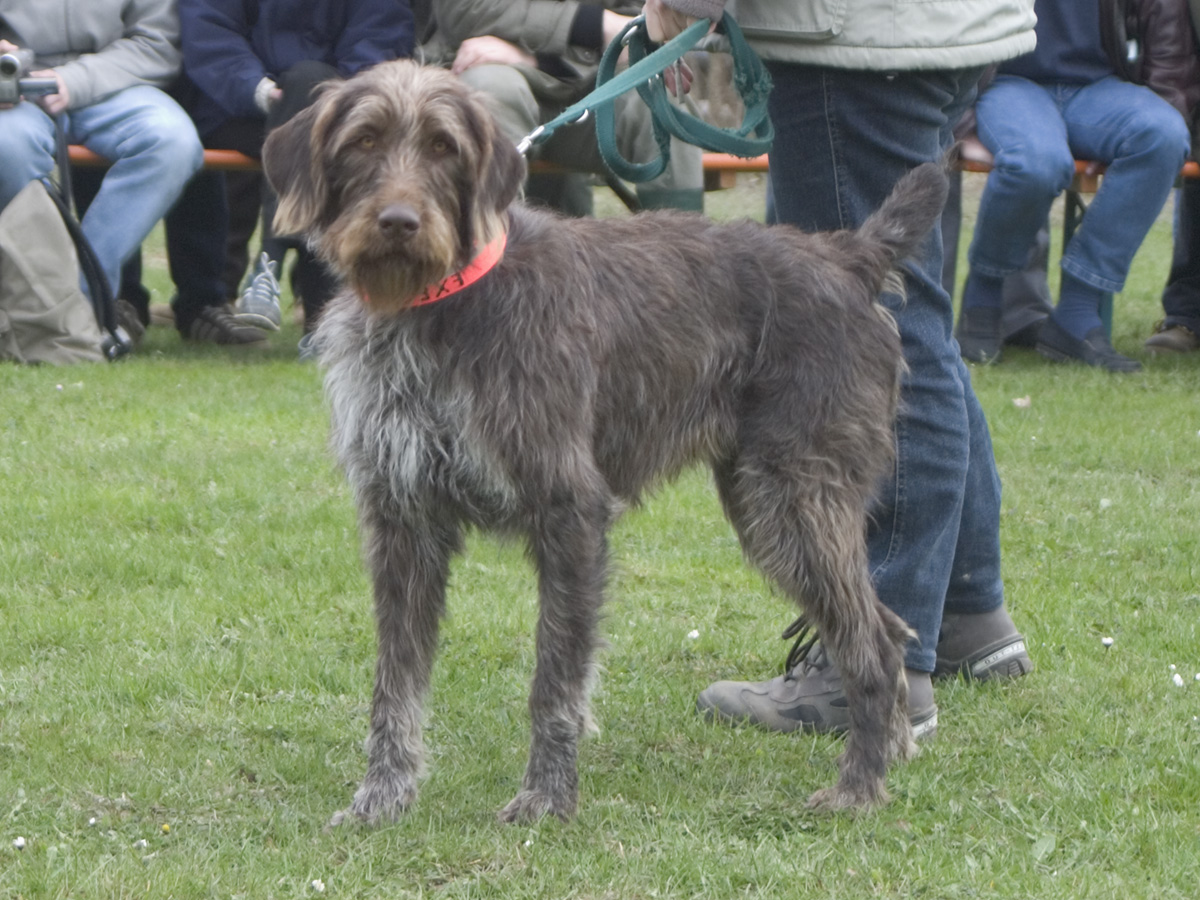
- Other names: Deutscher Stichelhaariger Vorstehhund; Staufhaarig; Hessischer Rauhbart; German Broken-Coated Pointer
- Common nicknames: Stichelhaar
- Origin: Germany
Traits
Height	Males	60–70 cm (24–28 in)
	Females	58–68 cm (23–27 in)
- Coat: Stiff, harsh and bristly
- Colour: Brown, brown roan or light roan, with or without white chest patch and brown patches
Kennel club standards
- VDH: standard
- Fédération Cynologique Internationale: standard

The German Roughhaired Pointer, more commonly known and internationally recognized as the Deutsch Stichelhaar is a medium-sized breed of pointing dog developed in Germany.

== History ==
In the early 19th century there were several varieties of rough-haired pointers found throughout Germany, with few attempts at standardising them as breeds. At some point in the development of the German Roughhaired Pointer, old German shepherd dog blood was introduced; the word stichelhaariger in the breed name translates to rough-haired, reflective of this blood. Nearly extinct by the middle of the century, the Roughhaired Pointer was saved through the efforts of a single breeder, and in the second half of the century serious attempts were made to standardise the type. By the end of the century it was accepted as a district breed.

The German Roughhaired Pointer has never been as popular as the other German pointer breeds and is rarely if ever seen outside of Germany.

== Description ==
The German Roughhaired Pointer is a medium-sized breed; their appearance is very similar to the more numerous German Wirehaired Pointer and the Wirehaired Pointing Griffon. Their overall appearance is robust without being overly heavy. The breed standard states they stand between 58 and 70 centimetres (23 and 28 in), with dogs standing between 60 and 70 centimetres (24 and 28 in) and bitches between 58 and 68 centimetres (23 and 27 in).

The principal difference between the breed and the German Wirehaired Pointer is the head. It is heavier and broader, a trait it inherited from its shepherd forebears; it has hanging ears and particularly long eyebrows that give it an almost threatening appearance. The breed's stiff, harsh and bristly coat is usually 37 millimetres (1.5 in) long; they can be solid brown, brown roan or light roan in colour. Some have a white patch on their chest whilst some roan examples also have brown patches in their coats.

The breed is known to be particularly aggressive towards predatory animals and wary of strangers.

== See also ==
- List of dog breeds
