= Braque Français =

Braque Français (Gascogne)
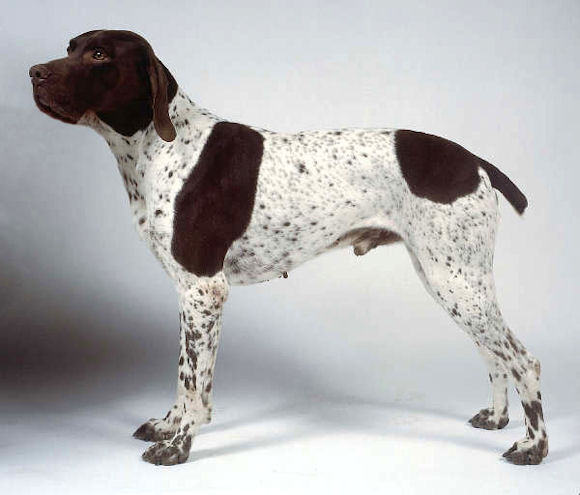
- Male Braque Français of type Gascogne
- Other names: French Pointing Dog - Gascogne Type; Braque Français, de Grande Taille
- Origin: France
Traits
Height	Males	58–69 cm (23–27 in)
	Females	56–68 cm (22–27 in)
- Coat: thick and well furnished, finer on the head and ears
- Colour: chestnut brown, either solid or mixed with white, with or without ticking or roaning or tan markings
Kennel club standards
- Société Centrale Canine: standard
- Fédération Cynologique Internationale: standard

Braque Français (Pyrenees)
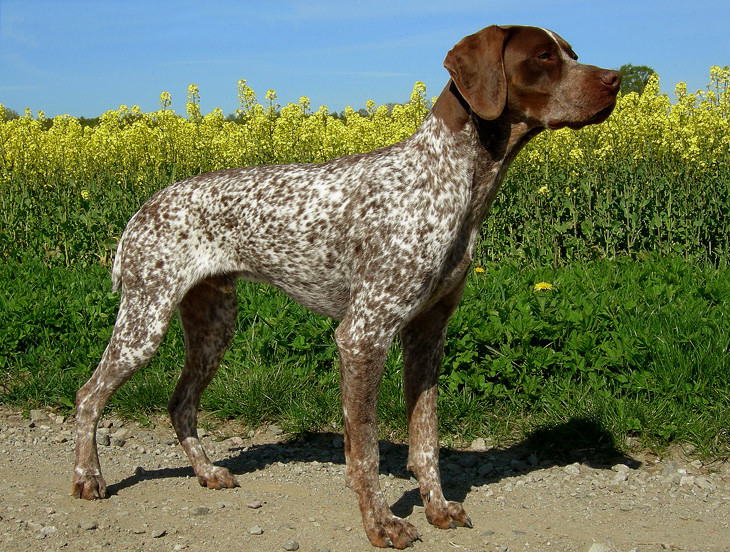
- Male Braque Français of type Pyrenees
- Other names: French Pointing Dog - Pyrenean Type; Braque Français, de Petite Taille
- Origin: France
Traits
Height	Males	47–58 cm (19–23 in)
	Females	47–56 cm (19–22 in)
- Coat: fine and short
- Colour: chestnut brown, either solid or mixed with white, with or without ticking or roaning or tan markings
Kennel club standards
- Société Centrale Canine: standard
- Fédération Cynologique Internationale: standard

The Braques Français are hunting dogs, from a very old type of gun dog used for pointing the location of game birds for a hunter. There are two breeds of Braque Français, both from the south of France, the Braque français, type Gascogne (French Pointing Dog – Gascogne type, larger size) and the Braque français, type Pyrénées (French Pointing Dog – Pyrenean type, smaller size) They are popular hunting dogs in France, but are seldom seen elsewhere.

== History ==
Over the centuries, the dogs were taken to other countries and were crossed with other breeds. When a search was made at the end of the nineteenth century to find the original dogs, two separate regional varieties were found.

The first breed club was formed in 1850, and the standards for both breeds were written in 1880. It is recognised by the Société Centrale Canine in France, and world-wide by the Fédération Cynologique Internationale. The S.C.C. prohibits inbreeding or linebreeding and will not register any dog with common ancestors in the first three generations of its pedigree. Of the major kennel clubs in the English-speaking world, only the Canadian Kennel Club in Canada and the United Kennel Club in the U.S. recognise them. The Canadian Kennel Club recognises one breed, the Braque Français (Gascogne) in its Sporting Dogs Group and the United Kennel Club recognises both breeds, in its Gundog Group, with the names Braque Français De Grande Taille and Braque Français, De Petite Taille - petite taille (smaller size) means the Pyrenean is smaller than the Gascogne, and does not mean that it is a little dog.

== Hunting use ==
The Braque Français breeds are not just pointers, but versatile hunting dogs that can retrieve, flush, and even trail game in all sorts of terrain. The Pyrénées is a quick dog that can move fast without sprinting, while the Gascogne is a slower moving dog.

== Appearance ==
Both breeds of Braque Français are of medium to large size, with long legs and long drop ears. The coat is short, and chestnut brown or white speckled with brown in colour, often with one or more large brown spots. The head is usually brown. The Gascogne type is about 10 centimetres (3.9 in) taller at the withers than the Pyrenean.

=== Differences ===
- The Braque Français, type Pyrénées, stands about 47–58 centimetres (19–23 in) at the withers, females slightly smaller, giving the impression of "a German Shorthaired Pointer shrunk down to Brittany size". The larger Braque français, type Gascogne dogs are 58–69 centimetres (23–27 in) (females smaller)
- The coat of the Gascogne is thick, while that of the Pyrénées is shorter and finer The Pyrénées is usually more mottled brown on the body.
- The head of the Pyrénées is slightly broader, and the ears are not as long. On the Gascogne, if the ears are pulled forward, they reach the tip of the nose. The Gascogne has slightly pendulous lips, making the muzzle appear square; the Pyrénées muzzle looks more narrow.
