= Portuguese Pointer =

Portuguese breed of dog

Portuguese Pointing Dog
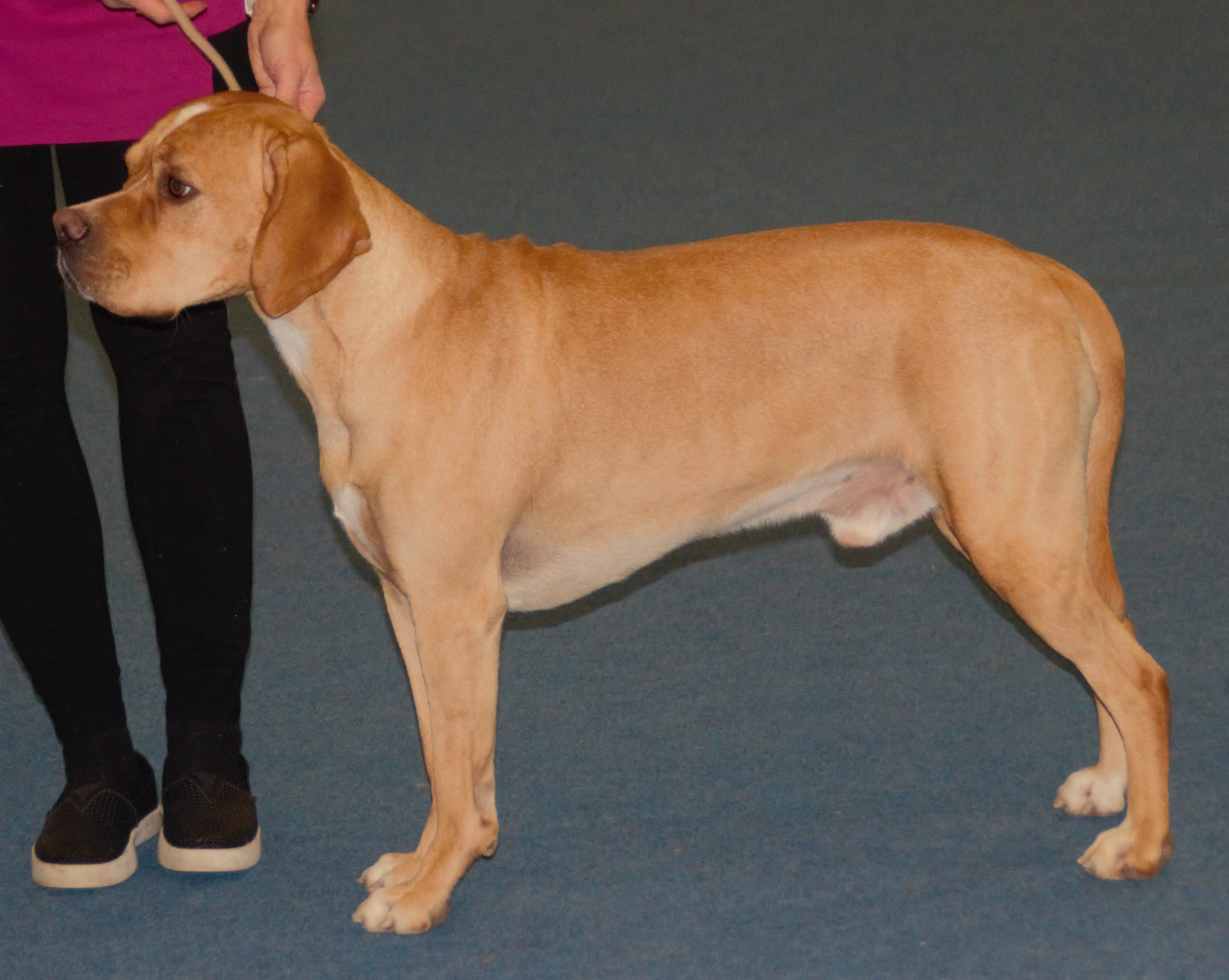
- A dog

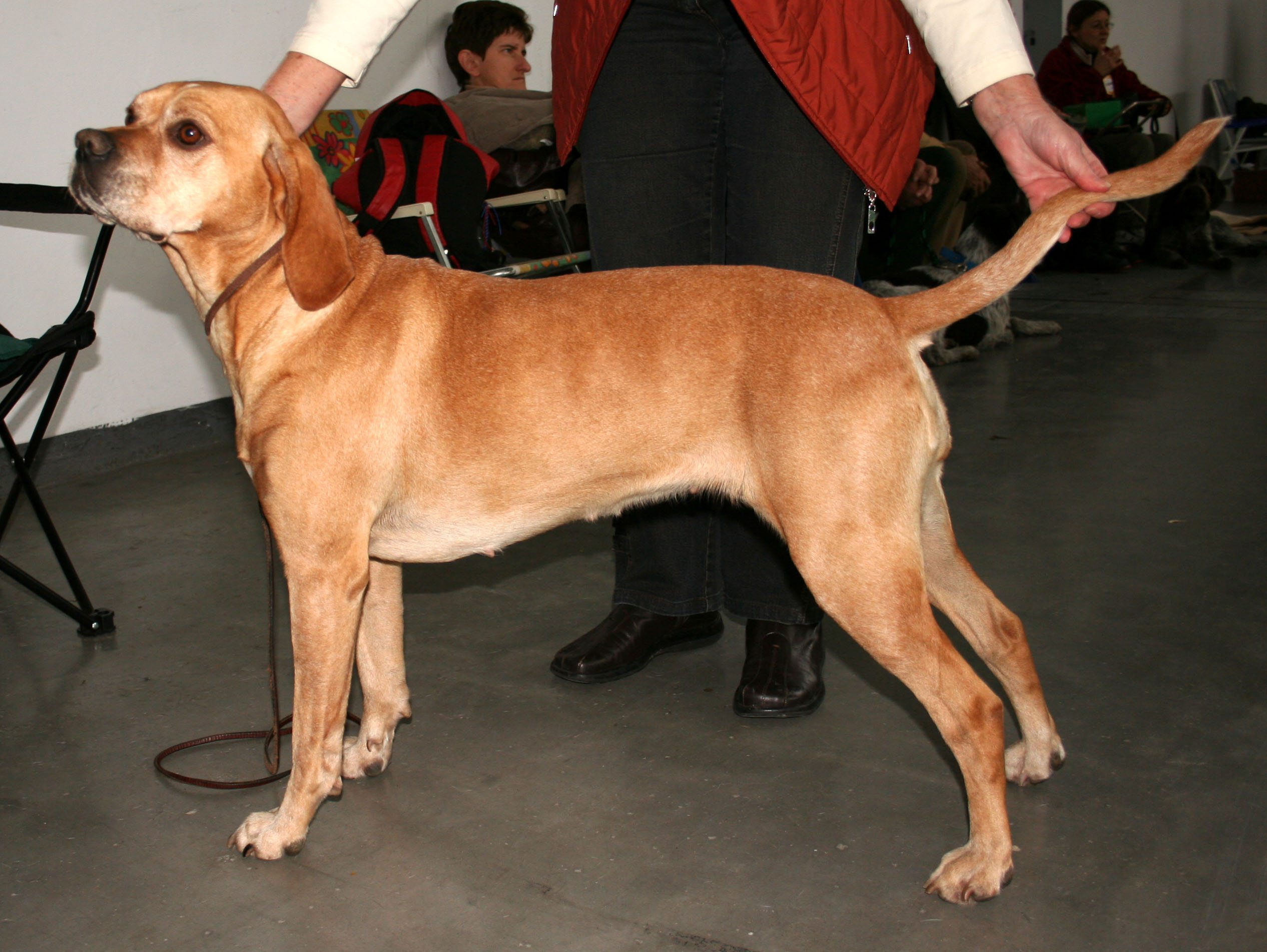
- A bitch
- Other names: Perdigueiro Português
- Origin: Portugal
- Distribution: nationwide
Traits
Height	Males	54–60 cm (21–24 in)
	Females	50–56 cm (20–22 in)
Weight	Males	20–27 kg (45–60 lb)
	Females	16–22 kg (35–50 lb)
- Coat: short, close hard, dense
- Colour: light, medium or dark yellow, with or without white markings
Kennel club standards
- Clube Português de Canicultura: standard
- Fédération Cynologique Internationale: standard

The Portuguese Pointing Dog or Perdigueiro Português is a Portuguese breed of pointer dog. It is one of several Portuguese pointing breeds and is mainly used in hunting red-legged partridge.

== History ==
The first breed standard for the Perdiguero was drawn up in 1939. The breed was definitively accepted by the Fédération Cynologique Internationale in 1955. In 2006 there were 1805 bitches registered in the stud-book.

== Characteristics ==
The Perdiguero is of medium size: height at the withers is in the range 54 to 60 cm for dogs and 50 to 56 cm for bitches; body weights are in the ranges 20 to 27 kg and 16 to 22 kg respectively. (Note: In the international standard of the Fédération Cynologique Internationale, the minimum height for both dogs and bitches is lower by 2 cm)

The coat is without undercoat; it is short, close and coarse on most parts of the dog, thinner around the natural openings and thinner and softer on the ears and head. It is yellow, ranging from light to dark, with or without white markings on the head and neck, the chest, the lower legs and the tip of the tail.
