= Pudelpointer =

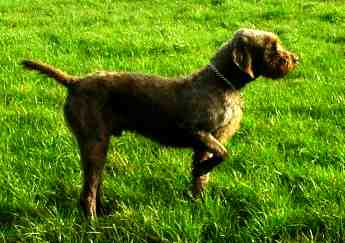
- Pudelpointer pointing
- Origin: Germany
Kennel club standards
- VDH: standard
- Fédération Cynologique Internationale: standard

The Pudelpointer is a versatile hunting dog breed from Germany. It is a pointing breed that came from a cross between the standard poodle (pudel) and the English Pointer.

== Appearance ==
The breed weighs between 44 and 66 lb (20 and 30 kg), stands 21 to 26 in (53 to 66 cm) at the shoulder, and comes in liver, chestnut, and occasionally black coats. The ideal coat is harsh, wiry, and dense. The dogs shed very little.

== History ==
In 1881, a German breeder, Baron 'Hegewald' von Zedlitz, worked on producing his ideal tracking, pointing, and retrieving gun dog, suitable for work on both land and water. From seven poodles and 90 different pointers, he developed the Pudelpointer. The original sire was Tell, an English Pointer belonging to Kaiser Frederick III and the original dam was a German hunting pudel named Molly who was owned by Hegewald.

The goal was to produce a dog that was willing and easy to train, intelligent, and loved water and retrieving, like the poodle, and add to that a great desire to hunt, a strong pointing instinct, and an excellent nose, like in the English Pointer, as well as being an excellent companion in the home.

The Poodle breed had much stronger genes, and so many more Pointers were used to achieve the balanced hunting dog that was desired. A mix of 11 Pudels and 80 Pointers were used during the first 30 years to achieve the desired traits and results.

The breed was introduced to North America in 1956 by Bodo Winterhelt, who remained involved in maintaining the breed standard until his death in 2018. His Winterhelle Kennel was the foundation of the breed in North America. In 1977 Winterhelt founded the Pudelpointer Club of North America in Canada.

In Germany as well as North America, its performance standards are its most important trait. Before being approved for breeding, dogs and bitches must pass Hunt Test with minimum scores of their performance tests of its field, tracking, and water skills set by the various breed clubs. These clubs are the Verein Pudelpointer in Germany and the following clubs in North America: NAPPA, PCNA and VPP-GNA). The North American Versatile Hunting Dog Association (NAVHDA) also tests Pudelpointers and other breeds of versatile hunting dogs.

The Pudelpointer never became a popularized breed in the United States in part because breeders have actively avoided recognition by the American Kennel Club. Breeders believe that AKC recognition would place too much emphasis on form over function, possibly splitting the breed into a show breed and separate working class.

== See also ==
- List of dog breeds
