= North American Versatile Hunting Dog Association =

American Versatile Hunting Dog Association

The North American Versatile Hunting Dog Association (NAVHDA) is a dog training and testing organization in North America. Founded in 1969, NAVHDA's mission is to foster, promote, and improve the versatile hunting dog breeds in North America. The group has over 100 local chapters in the U.S. and Canada, which offer regular training and testing programs.

The organization describes its work as a complement to the activities of sporting dog breed clubs and field trial organizations, "created to supplement the activities of those clubs by providing a proven, standard method of evaluating the performance of all versatile hunting dogs, consistent with North American hunting practices, regardless of breed."
