= German Wirehaired Pointer =

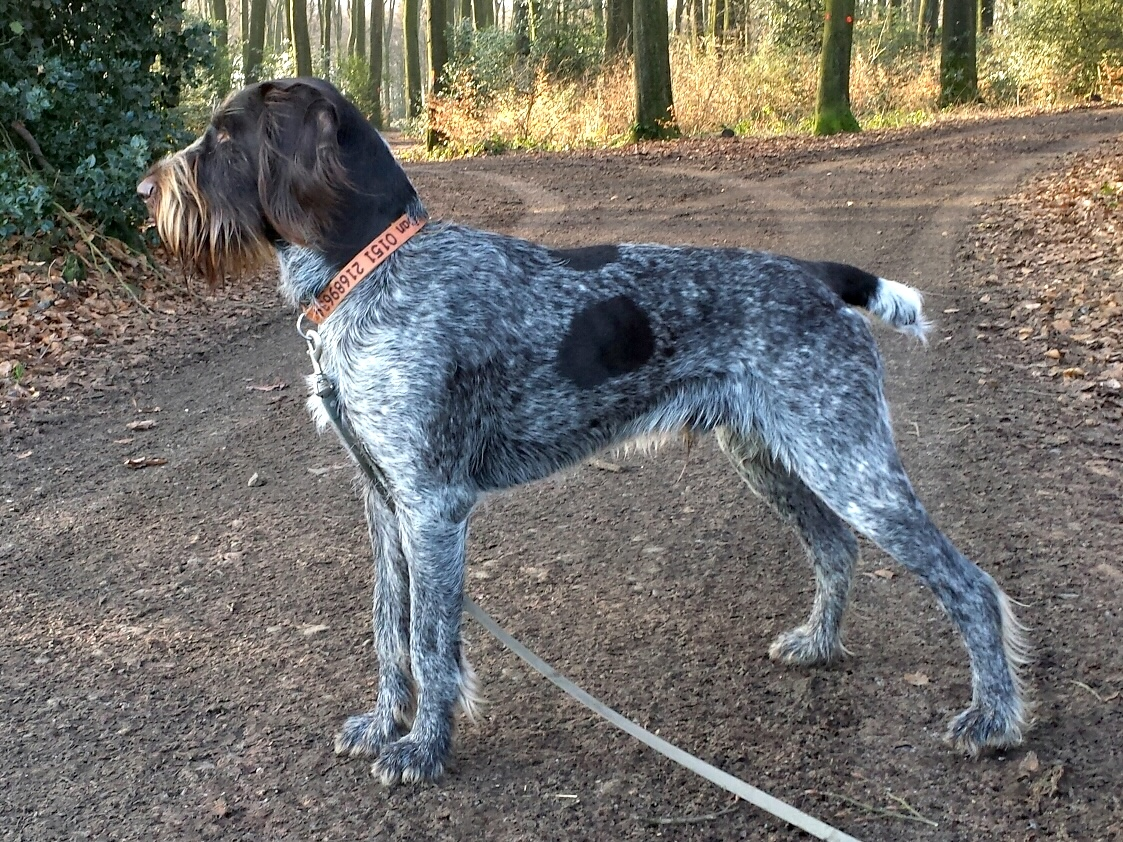

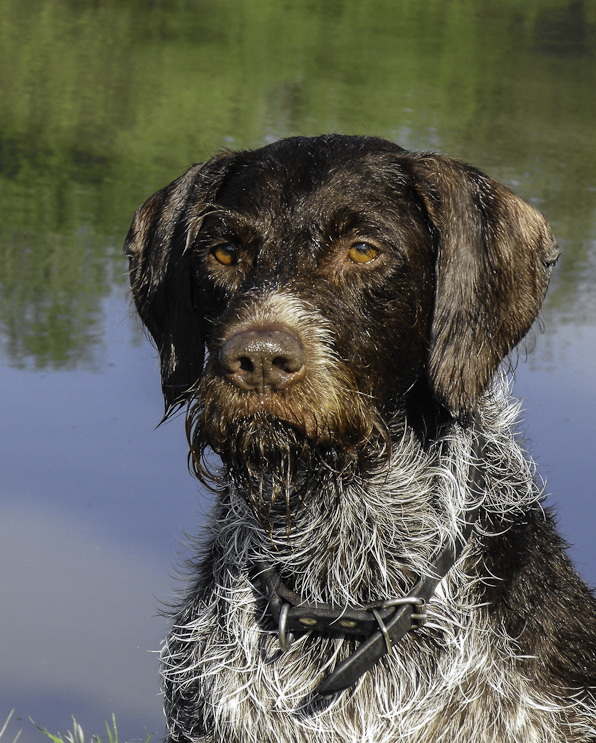
- Other names: Deutsch Drahthaar; Deutscher Drahthaariger Vorstehhund; Drahthaar
- Origin: Germany
Traits
Height	Males	61–68 cm
	Females	57–64 cm
Kennel club standards
- Verband für das Deutsche Hundewesen: standard
- Fédération Cynologique Internationale: standard

The German Wirehaired Pointer or Deutsch Drahthaar is a German breed of pointing dog of Griffon type. It is closely related to the other German pointer breeds, the German Short-haired Pointer, the German Long-haired Pointer and the Large Münsterländer. It was definitively accepted by the Fédération Cynologique Internationale in 1954.

== History ==
The Deutsch Drahthaar was definitively accepted by the Fédération Cynologique Internationale in 1954.

In the fifteen years from 2010 to 2024, the annual number of new registrations in Germany averaged just over 3000, with a low of 2587 and a high of 3629; the total number of registrations in the period was 45066, or about 4% of the total of 1127154 registrations.

== Health ==
A 2024 UK study found a median longevity of 13 years for the breed, close to the average of 12.5 for all dogs.
