= Wirehaired Pointing Griffon =

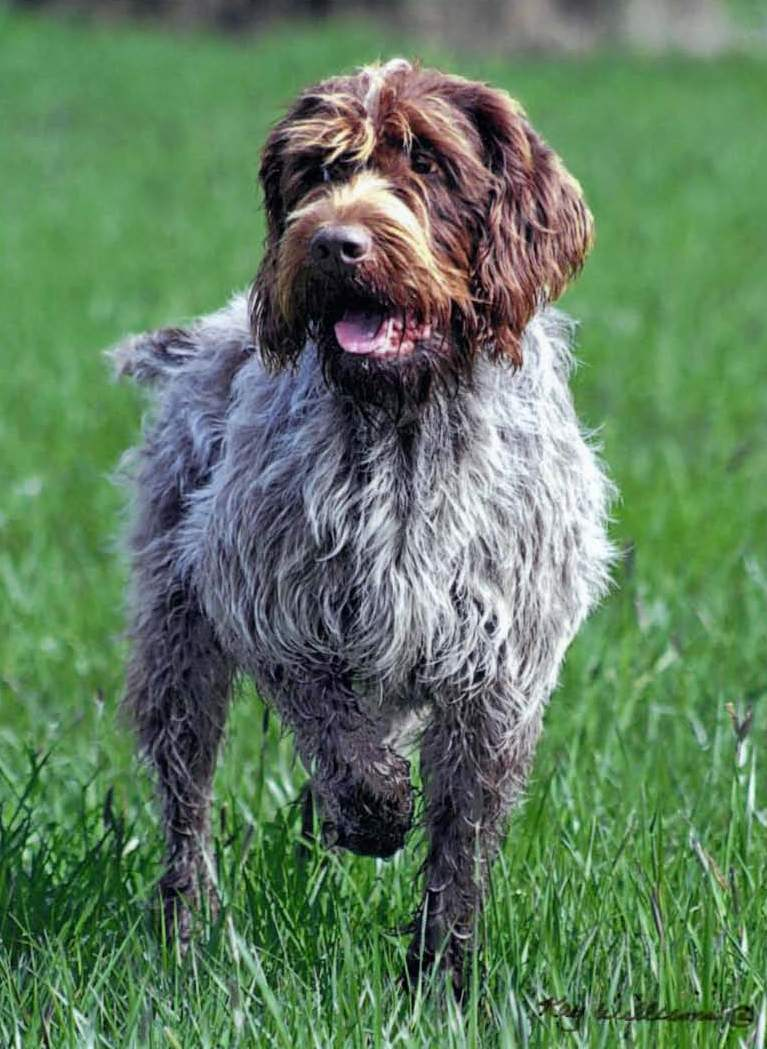
- Wirehaired Pointing Griffon
- Other names: Korthals Griffon; Griffon d'arrêt à poil dur Korthals
- Origin: Netherlands, Germany, France
Traits
| Height | Males | 22–24 in (56–61 cm) |
| | Females | 20–22 in (51–56 cm) |
- Coat: Dense, wiry double coat. Undercoat is thick and provides insulation.
Kennel club standards
- Société Centrale Canine: standard
- Fédération Cynologique Internationale: standard

The Wirehaired Pointing Griffon (also called the Korthals Griffon and the Griffon d'arrêt à poil dur Korthals in France and Quebec) is a breed of dog used in hunting as a gundog. It is sometimes considered to be Dutch in ancestry, due to the nationality of the breed founder, Eduard Karel Korthals. History records the progression of the development of the breed through Biebesheim am Rhein, Germany where the founder established the Ipenwoud kennel and the breed type was established and then into France where it is now recognized. Others consider the Griffon to be a German breed because Korthals' kennel, Ipenwoud, was located in Biebesheim am Rhein, Germany. It was there for over twenty years that Korthals dedicated his life to the development and perfection of the Korthals Griffon.

The breed is still relatively rare in the United States, Canada, and the United Kingdom despite long recognition by their respective national kennel clubs, as well as the FCI (Fédération Cynologique Internationale). The Korthals Griffon is particularly adapted for hunting in thick undergrowth and around water, where its harsh coat is excellent protection. The griffon is used primarily as a hunting dog for upland game birds as well as waterfowl.

== Appearance ==
The Korthals Griffon is a strong medium-sized dog (20-22" for females, 22-24" for males) and 35-50 pounds for females and 50-70 pounds for males with a harsh, wiry outer coat and a softer under coat. The coat is preferably steel gray with brown markings. Other acceptable colors: chestnut brown, white and brown, roan, and white and orange. All brown, all white or white and orange are less desirable. A black coat disqualifies.

The griffon has a large and long head, with large rounded eyes covered with eyebrows and complemented with a beard. The nose is always brown. The neck is long and body well proportioned and muscular. Depending on the country, the tail may be docked.

== Health and temperament ==
Korthals Griffons are known as intelligent with softer temperaments but with a willingness to please. They do not adapt well to harsh training methods. Most Griffons do not take well to living their lives in kennels. Regular exercise and training is highly recommended. They are extremely people oriented and prefer to be somewhere in the vicinity of their owners. The breed organizations recommend purchasing from breeders providing health clearances on written contracts on their guarantees. Recent research had discovered the infusion of another breed into the Griffon worldwide. This has caused a split in most countries between those individuals wishing to retain the genuine Korthals Griffon with the clubs recognizing all breedings including the outcross hybrids.

== Shedding ==
Contrary to some publications, the Griffon is not non-shedding. However, it does shed considerably less than many other breeds. All dogs shed, and it is the dog's dander and saliva that trigger most allergic reactions. Allergists do recognize that at times a particular allergy patient will be able to tolerate a particular dog (and many Griff owners consider these dogs hypoallergenic), but it may be that "the luck of the few with their pets cannot be stretched to fit all allergic people and entire breeds of dogs." Allergists "think there really are differences in protein production between dogs that may help one patient and not another", meaning that some allergic people may not have allergic reactions to a specific dog.

== History ==
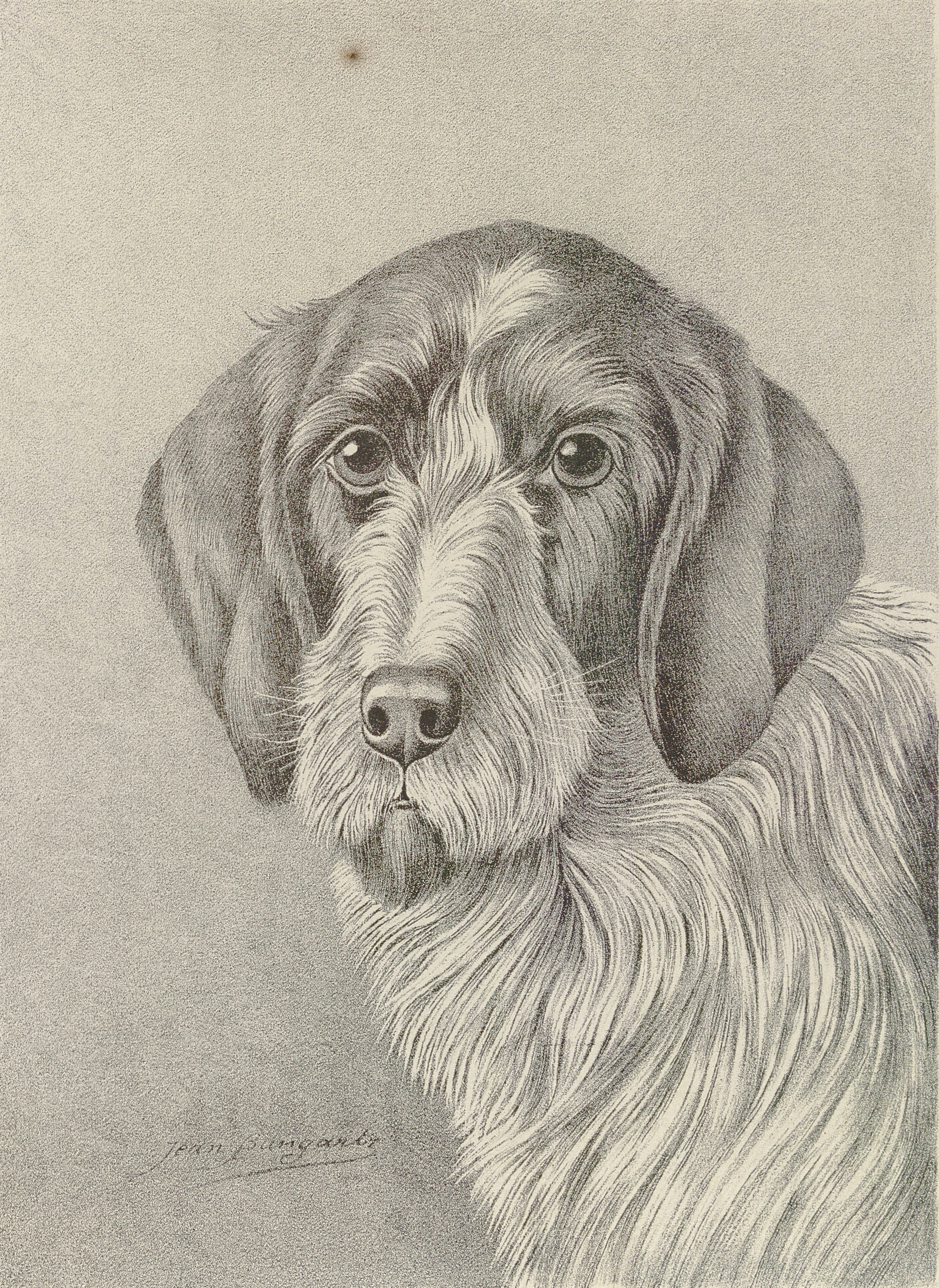
Wirehaired Pointing Griffon on an 1890 illustration

Eduard Karel Korthals is credited with the breed around 1873. Korthals' dream was to create the ideal versatile gun dog; one with extreme resiliency, vigor, and devotion to its master. The dog would also have to work close to its master, and be open to training.

Korthals' breeding line began in 1874 with "Mouche", who would be used as its foundation bitch, as well as five other dogs described as "Griffons": Janus, Satan, Banco, Hector, and Junon. He interbred the dogs carefully until offspring were produced that resembled his idea of an ultimate hunting dog. In any event, the resulting offspring (Moustache I, Lina, and Querida) are referred to as the "Korthals Patriarchs" because they are the Griffon's direct ancestors. In 1888 the first "griffon club" was formed as an international organization with local clubs in Bavaria "Southern German Griffon Clue" in 1895, in Belgium the "Royal Belgium Griffon Club" (1895) in France "French Wirehaired Griffon Club (1901) soon followed.

The American Kennel Club's first registered Korthals Griffons (called Wirehaired Pointing Griffon in the USA) was "Zolette", who was entered into the stud book in 1887. However, the Griffon was still relatively unknown, and she was registered as a "Russian Setter (Griffon)" for her presumed Russian heritage. It was not until 1916, twenty-nine years later, that the breed was officially recognized as the Wirehaired Pointing Griffon in the United States. In that same year, sixteen Griffons appeared in the Westminster Kennel Club Dog Show, one of the most prestigious shows in the country. Since then, the breed has grown in popularity as not only a show dog but also a versatile gun dog, Korthals' original intention for the breed. For the most part, the breed still resembles his original intentions: a medium size, harsh coat, good degree of trainability, and resilient on the field and in the ring.

== Gallery ==
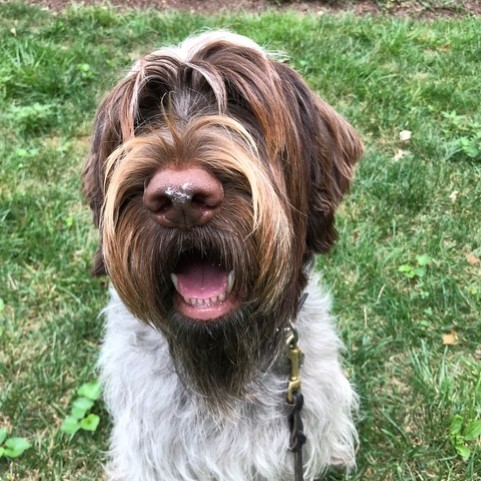
Close up head shot photo of a Wirehaired Pointing Griffon

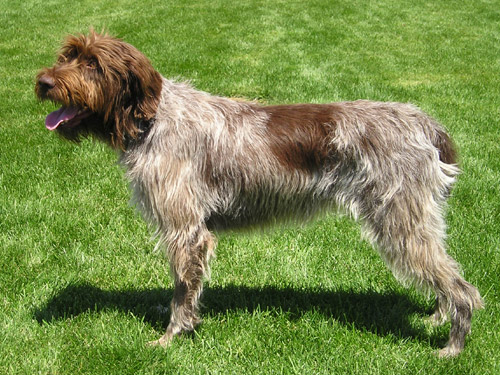
Full body sideview of a Korthals Griffon

== See also ==
- List of dog breeds
- Pointing breed
- German Wirehaired Pointer
- Cesky Fousek, also known as the Bohemian Wirehaired Pointing Griffon
- Hypoallergenic dog breed
