= Segugio Italiano =

Segugio Italiano or segugio italiano may refer to:

- the Segugio dell'Appennino, an Italian breed of small scent hound
- the Segugio Italiano a Pelo Forte, a wire-haired Italian breed of scent hound
- the Segugio Italiano a Pelo Raso, a smooth-haired Italian breed of scent hound
- the Segugio Maremmano, a Tuscan breed of scent hound
