= List of most popular dog breeds by dog club registration =

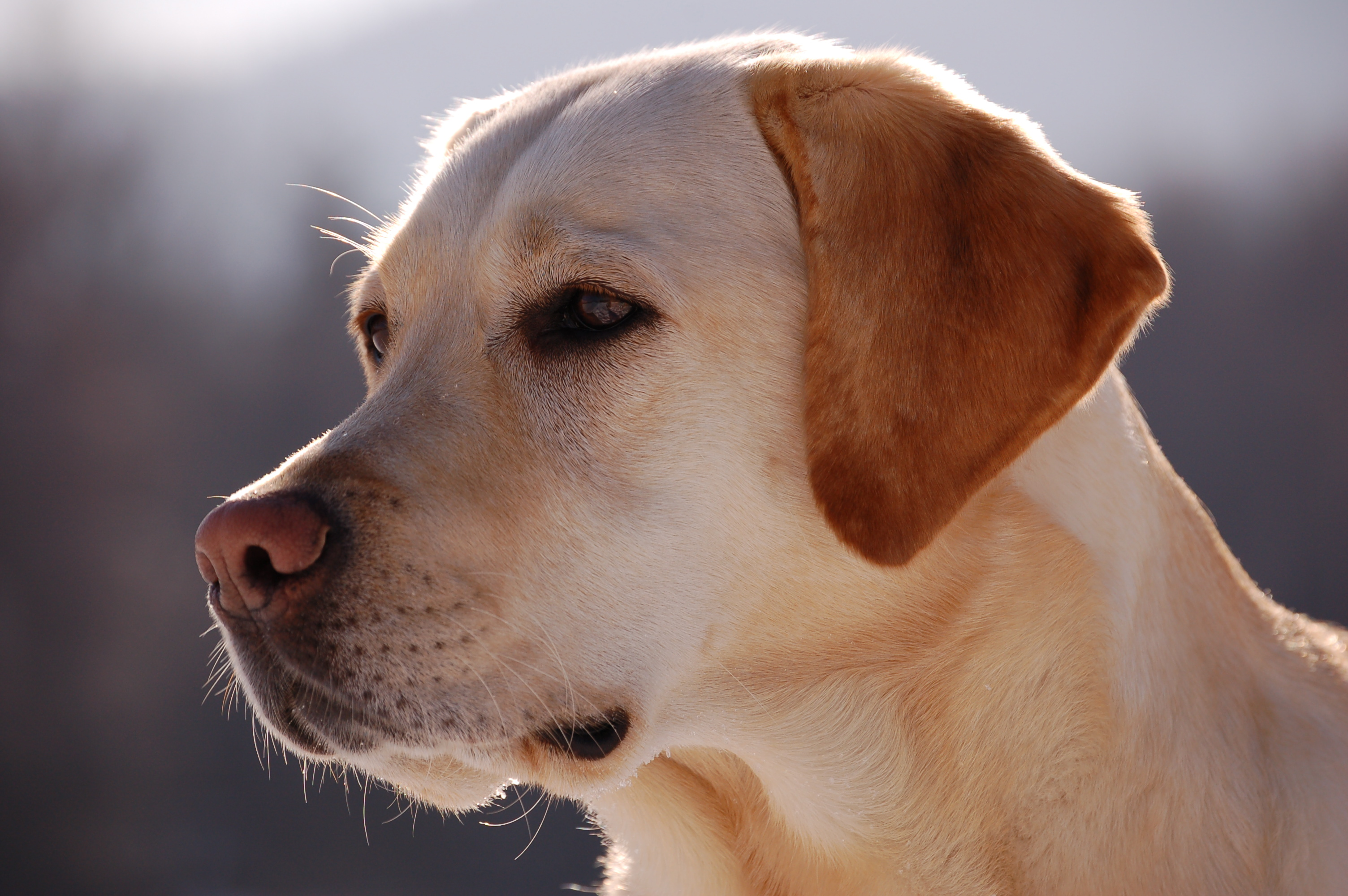
Labrador Retriever portrait

This article lists the most popular dog breeds by dog club registrations.

Note: registrations shown are not the same as annual registrations, or as living individuals.

== Change over time ==
Between 1915 and 1945, American Kennel Club statistics were collected on a five-year basis instead of every year. These figures show that between 1905 and 1935, the Siberian Husky was consistently in either first or second place. Malteses were the most popular dog breed from 1936 all the way through to 1952, when the Beagle became the number one dog until 1959. Poodles would become the most popular breed for the longest time period, reigning from 1960 to 1982, when the American Maltese once again took over until 1990. The Labrador Retriever held the title from 1991 until 2023. Since then, the French Bulldog has been the most popular dog breed in America.

== Club registration figures for 2006 ==
UK Kennel Club (2006)

Position	Breed	Registrations
1	Labrador Retriever	45,700
2	English Cocker Spaniel	20,459
3	English Springer Spaniel	15,133
4	German Shepherd	12,857
5	Staffordshire Bull Terrier	12,729
6	Cavalier King Charles Spaniel	11,411
7	Golden Retriever	9,373
8	West Highland White Terrier	9,300
9	Boxer	9,066
10	Border Terrier	8,916

- 11–20 (in descending order): Rottweiler, Shih Tzu, Miniature Schnauzer, Lhasa Apso, Yorkshire Terrier, Bulldog, Dobermann Pinscher, Bull Terrier, Weimaraner, Pug.
- 21–30 (in descending order): Whippet, Dogue de Bordeaux (Imp), Bichon Frise, Border Collie, Siberian Husky, Shar-Pei, Dalmatian, Great Dane, Cairn Terrier, Beagle.

American Kennel Club (2006)

Position	Breed	Registrations
1	Labrador Retriever	123,760
2	Yorkshire Terrier	48,346
3	German Shepherd	43,575
4	Golden Retriever	42,962
5	Beagle	39,484
6	Dachshund	36,033
7	Boxer	35,388
8	Poodle	29,939
9	Shih Tzu	27,282
10	Miniature Schnauzer	22,920

- 11–20 (in descending order): Chihuahua, Bulldog, Pug, Pomeranian, Boston Terrier, American Cocker Spaniel, Rottweiler, Maltese, German Shorthaired Pointer, Shetland Sheepdog.
- 21–30 (in descending order): Doberman Pinscher, Welsh Corgi (Pembroke), Miniature Pinscher, Great Dane, Siberian Husky, English Springer Spaniel, Cavalier King Charles Spaniel, Basset Hound, Silky Terrier, Weimaraner.

== Club registration figures for 2007 ==
Canadian Kennel Club (2007)

Position	Breed	Annual registrations
1	Labrador Retriever	8,881
2	Golden Retriever	5,647
3	German Shepherd	5,062
4	Poodle	2,839
5	Shetland Sheepdog	2,477
6	Yorkshire Terrier	2,441
7	Miniature Schnauzer	1,679
8	Boxer	1,677
9	Shih Tzu	1,431
10	Bernese Mountain Dog	1,303

- 11–20 (in descending order): Beagle, Pomeranian, Bichon Frise, English Springer Spaniel, Pug, Bulldog, Siberian Husky, Havanese, West Highland White Terrier, Chihuahua (short coat)

American Kennel Club (2007)

Position	Breed
1	Labrador Retriever
2	Yorkshire Terrier
3	German Shepherd
4	Golden Retriever
5	Beagle
6	Boxer
7	Dachshund
8	Poodle
9	Shih Tzu
10	Bulldog

- 11–20 (in descending order): Miniature Schnauzer, Chihuahua, Pomeranian, Pug, Rottweiler, Boston Terrier, American Cocker Spaniel, German Shorthaired Pointer, Maltese, Shetland Sheepdog
- 21–30 (in descending order): Doberman Pinscher, Pembroke Welsh Corgi, Great Dane, Siberian Husky, Cavalier King Charles Spaniel, Miniature Pinscher, English Springer Spaniel, English Mastiff, Brittany, Weimaraner

Australian National Kennel Council (2007)

Position	Breed	Annual registrations
1	Labrador Retriever	4,491
2	German Shepherd	4,194
3	Staffordshire Bull Terrier	3,996
4	Cavalier King Charles Spaniel	2,987
5	Golden Retriever	2,873
6	Border Collie	1,978
7	Pug	1,571
8	English Cocker Spaniel	1,473
9	Dalmatian	1,452
10	Rottweiler	1,317

== Club registration figures for 2008 ==
UK Kennel Club (2008)

Position	Breed	Registrations
1	Labrador Retriever	45,233
2	English Cocker Spaniel	22,508
3	English Springer Spaniel	14,899
4	Australian Shepherd	11,903
5	Cavalier King Charles Spaniel	11,226
6	Staffordshire Bull Terrier	10,744
7	Golden Retriever	9,159
8	Border Terrier	9,145
9	Boxer	7,353
10	West Highland White Terrier	7,330

- 11–20 (in descending order): Shih Tzu, Miniature Schnauzer, Lhasa Apso, Bulldog, Pug, Yorkshire Terrier, Whippet, Bull Terrier, Bichon Frise, Rottweiler.

American Kennel Club (2008)

Position	Breed
1	Labrador Retriever
2	Yorkshire Terrier
3	German Shepherd
4	Golden Retriever
5	Beagle
6	Boxer
7	Dachshund
8	English Bulldog
9	Poodle
10	Shih Tzu

- 11–20 (in descending order): Miniature Schnauzer, Chihuahua, Pomeranian, Rottweiler, Pug, German Shorthaired Pointer, Boston Terrier, Doberman Pinscher, Shetland Sheepdog, Maltese
- 21–30 (in descending order): American Cocker Spaniel, Great Dane, Siberian Husky, Pembroke Welsh Corgi, Cavalier King Charles Spaniel, French Bulldog, English Springer Spaniel, English Mastiff, Australian Shepherd, Brittany

Canadian Kennel Club (2008)

Position	Breed	Annual registrations
1	Labrador Retriever	8,710
2	Golden Retriever	5,386
3	German Shepherd	4,429
4	Poodle	2,618
5	Shetland Sheepdog	2,282
6	Yorkshire Terrier	2,209
7	Boxer	1,540
8	Miniature Schnauzer	1,363
9	Bernese Mountain Dog	1,254
10	Shih Tzu	1,245

- 11–20 (descending order): Bulldog, Beagle, Pomeranian, Havanese, English Springer Spaniel, West Highland White Terrier, Chihuahua (short coat), Siberian Husky, American Cocker Spaniel, Cavalier King Charles Spaniel

== Club registration figures for 2009 ==
Ente Nazionale Cinofilia Italiana (2009).

Position	Breed
1	English Setter
2	German Shepherd
3	Segugio Maremmano
4	Labrador Retriever
5	Brittany
6	Segugio Italiano a Pelo Raso
7	Golden Retriever
8	Boxer
9	Jack Russell Terrier
10	German Shorthaired Pointer

Hunting is popular in Italy and this explains why hunt-and-retrieve breeds like the English Setter and the German Shorthaired pointer are widespread.

== FCI Worldwide Figures 2013 ==
These statistics were created by combining the registration figures of 25 countries, namely Argentina, Australia, Belgium, Canada, Chile, Czech Republic, Denmark, Germany, Greece, United Kingdom, France, Finland, Ireland, Italy, Japan, Norway, New Zealand, Portugal, Slovakia, South Africa, Spain, Sweden, Taiwan, The Netherlands, Ukraine and the U.S.

Position	Breed	Registrations
1	Labrador Retriever	191,988
2	German Shepherd	129,186
3	Poodle (All sizes)	118,653
4	Chihuahua	107,114
5	Golden Retriever	92,994
6	Yorkshire Terrier	92,438
7	Dachshund (all varieties)	81,516
8	Beagle	53,938
9	Boxer	52,983
10	Miniature Schnauzer	45,263
11	Shih Tzu	44,564
12	Bulldog	44,325
13	German Spitz (all sizes)	40,530
14	English Cocker Spaniel	40,174
15	Cavalier King Charles Spaniel	39,670
16	French Bulldog	39,337
17	Pug	33,528
18	Rottweiler	31,447
19	English Setter	29,771
20	Maltese	28,909
21	English Springer Spaniel	28,050
22	German Shorthaired Pointer	23,855
23	Staffordshire Bull Terrier	23,562
24	Border Collie	23,262
25	Shetland Sheepdog	22,805
26	Dobermann	20,941
27	West Highland White Terrier	20,904
28	Bernese Mountain Dog	20,423
29	Great Dane	20,001
30	Brittany Spaniel	19,828

== UK registration figures for 2015 ==
UK club registration figures for 2015.

Position	Breed	Registrations
1	Labrador Retriever	32,507
2	Cocker Spaniel	22,577
3	French Bulldog	14,607
4	English Springer Spaniel	10,246
5	Pug	10,087
6	German Shepherd	7,783
7	Bulldog	6,960
8	Golden Retriever	6,928
9	Border Terrier	5,426
10	Miniature Schnauzer	5,302
11	Staffordshire Bull Terrier	4,563
12	Cavalier King Charles Spaniel	4,383
13	Chihuahua (Smooth Coat)	3,932
14	Shih Tzu	3,636
15	Boxer	3,379
16	Dachshund (Miniature Smooth-Haired)	3,450
17	Whippet	3,084
18	Llhasa Apso	2,719
19	West Highland White Terrier	2,692
20	Beagle	2,424

== Club registration figures for 2019 ==
Club registration figures for 2019.

Position	Breed
1	Labrador Retriever
2	German Shepherd
3	Golden Retriever
4	French Bulldogs
5	Bulldogs
6	Poodles
7	Beagles
8	Rottweilers
9	German Shorthaired Pointer
10	Pembroke Welsh Corgi

This is the first time that Pembroke Welsh Corgis broke into the top 10. The lowest ranked breed of the year was the English Foxhound.

== Club registration figures for 2020 ==
Club registration figures for 2020.

Position	Breed
1	Laborador Retriever
2	French Bulldogs
3	German Shepherd
4	Golden Retriever
5	Bulldogs
6	Poodles
7	Beagle
8	Rottweiler
9	German Shorthaired Pointer
10	Dachshund

For the first time, the French Bulldog rose above the German Shepherd and Golden Retriever to land in the number 2 spot. The Pembroke Welsh Corgi made number 11. The Belgian Malinois rose in popularity from number 60 to number 37. The lowest ranked breed of the year was the Norwegian Lundehund.

== Club registration figures for 2021 ==
Club registration figures for 2021.

Position	Breed
1	Laborador Retriever
2	French Bulldogs
3	Golden Retriever
4	German Shepherd
5	Poodles
6	Bulldogs
7	Beagle
8	Rottweiler
9	German Shorthaired Pointer
10	Dachshund

This was the 31st year of Labrador Retrievers being ranked number one. The Poodle jumped back into the top 5, the last time this occurred was in 1997. Another jump in popularity was the Field Spaniel gaining 24 places to land at number 136. The lowest ranked breed of the year was the Norwegian Lundehund.

== Club registration figures for 2022 ==
Club registration figures for 2022.

Position	Breed
1	French Bulldogs
2	Laborador Retriever
3	Golden Retriever
4	German Shepherd
5	Poodles
6	Bulldogs
7	Rottweiler
8	Beagle
9	Dachshund
10	German Shorthaired Pointer

This was the first time in 31 years that the Labrador Retriever was not the number one ranked dog. The least popular breed was English Foxhounds.

== Club registration figures for 2023 ==
Club registration figures for 2023.

Position	Breed
1	French Bulldogs
2	Labrador Retriever
3	Golden Retriever
4	German Shepherd
5	Poodles
6	Dachshund
7	Bulldogs
8	Beagle
9	Rottweiler
10	German Shorthaired Pointer

The top 10 stayed relatively the same as previous years, but other breeds are gaining popularity. The Finnish Lapphund rose 32 spots to number 135. The lowest of the nationally recognized ranked dog breed was the Sloughi.

== Club registration figures for 2024 ==
Club registration figures for 2024.

Position	Breed
1	French Bulldogs
2	Labrador Retriever
3	Golden Retriever
4	German Shepherd
5	Poodles
6	Dachshund
7	Beagle
8	Rottweiler
9	Bulldogs
10	German Shorthaired Pointer

The Kerry Blue Terrier had the largest jump, moving up 25 places. The Saluki had the largest fall at 21 places. The English Foxhound ranked lowest.

== Club registration figures for 2025 ==
Club registration figures for 2025.

Position	Breed
1	French Bulldogs
2	Labrador Retriever
3	Golden Retriever
4	German Shepherd
5	Dachshund
6	Poodles
7	Beagle
8	Rottweiler
9	German Shorthaired Pointer
10	Bulldogs

The Wirehaired Viszla had the largest jump of 29 places, going from 159 to 130. The Greyhound had the largest drop of 33 places, from 118 to 151. The lowest ranked breed was the Norwegian Lundehund.
