= Confidential Memoirs: or Adventures of A Parrot, A Greyhound, A Cat and A Monkey =

1821 story collection by Mary Elliot

Confidential Memoirs: or Adventures of a Parrot, a Greyhound, a Cat and a Monkey
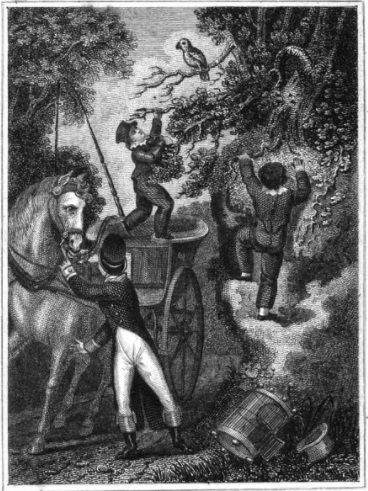
- Book Front Piece
- Author: Mary Elliot
- Language: English
- Genre: Children's Literature
- Published: 1821
- Publisher: William Darton
- Publication place: England

Confidential Memoirs: or Adventures of A Parrot, A Greyhound, A Cat and A Monkey (published by William Darton in London, 1821) is a collection of children's stories written by Mary Elliot (late Belson).

== Introduction ==
The text is divided into seven sections. The first section titled Confidential Memoirs &c introduces the setting of the novel; a house where four animals reside together with their owner. The following four stories are written from the perspective of the animals; a grey parrot named Poll, an Italian greyhound called Julio, a tortoise-shell cat called Puss (or Swandown) and a monkey called Pug. The animals take turns to share stories of how they came to live in their current home, Rose Hall. The final two sections are closing words from the author about the moral teachings of the stories, and a poem called Little Frank’s Dream .

== Background ==
Mary (Belson) Elliot was a writer of children’s books in the early Nineteenth-Century. It is difficult to ascertain the correct name for this author as it varies throughout different publications, sometimes appearing as; Mary Elliott, Mary Elliot, Mary (Belson) Elliot or Mary Belson. Elliot wrote a plethora of moral tales, hymns and poetry. Elliot's actual date of birth is currently unknown, however Elliot describes herself as a young lady in 1809 suggesting she was between 17 and 20 years old. Therefore, one can roughly assume she was born sometime between 1789 and 1792.

She began her writing career in 1809 when William Darton printed ‘for the author’ The Mice and their Pic Nic... By a Looking-Glass Maker, which is a lively story in verse about town and the country mice (the latter proving to be humbler, but happier); also, a book published anonymously titled Innocent Poetry. The latter was later claimed as Mary’s work, however in the first edition, some poems were signed ‘Eliza’, and some are unsigned. The preface to Innocent poetry states ‘The following Pages are chiefly the production of two young ladies, whose duty to an aged and infirm parent induced them to assign the trifling profits arising therefrom to her assistance and precarious support’ indicating that Eliza, the other young lady, is likely to be Mary Elliot’s sister. According to the Marjorie Moon's bibliography of Elliot's work, there roughly 470 publications under Elliot's name in total.

Mary Belson married to become Mary Elliot in 1819. No official record of her marriage has been discovered thus far, however, it is believed that Belson married a printer named Edward Elliot, who lived at 14 Holywell Street, The Strand. In 1844 The Small Edition of the Post Office lists a Mrs Mary Elliot as living there, referring to her as a ‘printer and publisher’ which allows one to reasonably assume that this is our author. After 1866 her name stops appearing in the Directory. It is also probable that Mary Elliot was a Quaker. This has been asserted by other writers

In a periodical titled Our Civilisation, it is reported that Mary Elliot was sentenced by Central Criminal Court to ‘serve a year of hard labour’ after being found guilty of ‘selling immoral books and prints in Hollywell street’ This corresponds with Moon’s introduction stating that Mr and Mrs. Elliot were living on Holywell Street.

== Stories ==
=== The Parrot's Story ===
Poll’s narrative starts in Brazil. She is captured and taken to Europe where she is passed between several owners. She is revered for her ability to speak English, amongst other languages, which generally ensures she is well treated. Poll successfully escapes from her cage on two occasions; on the first, Poll leaves a nice home to be captured and taken to a squalid home, the second escape removes her from the grasps of two malicious young boys, allowing her to fall into the hands of an agreeable old couple. When the old lady of the couple (Lady Placid) dies, her husband is so overcome with grief that he can no longer keep Poll, and takes her to live with Lady Placid’s sister at Rose Hall, where all the animals currently reside.

=== Julio's Story ===
Julio is a Greyhound born in a palace in Florence, Italy. An English gentleman, Sir Edward Butler, takes him to Ireland. On Christmas Day, the pair arrive at the Gentleman’s Mother’s house. Julio is lost, but returned to the house. Lady Butler (the gentleman's mother) has a paralytic stroke and Julio is chosen to accompany her abroad. On the journey, Julio is poisoned by infected meat. Too ill to leave the country he remains with his host, Mrs. Dormer. Julio recovers and is taken to London. Julio is out on a walk when a strange man captures him. Julio is sold for six guineas to an older gentleman who gives Julio to his daughter. Julio is treated badly by the gentleman's grandchildren and is taken back to live with the elderly gentleman and his nephew. Eventually, Julio's elderly owner dies, his nephew goes to school. Julio is therefore sent to live at Rose Hall with Mrs. Spencer.

=== Swandown's Adventures ===
Swandown’s life begins in an English farm-house. She is the only tortoise-shell cat of her litter and many of her siblings are drowned. When her owner finds out she is not worth much, she is taken to The Grange. The two children that Swandown lives with are nice, however a visiting child plays a cruel prank resulting in Swandown being removed from the nursery. Swandown eats a pet bird in the stable. She is beaten and removed from the property. The man rehoming Swandown is persuaded to drown her. A man on a coach rescues Swandown, giving her to the landlady of an Inn. She looked after until visitors to the Inn steal her and take her to London. When her new owners leave for Calais, Swandown befriends a neighbouring cat. Eating stolen food with her friend, the two cats are caught and Swandown escapes into the city. Wandering into a shop, Swandown is taken to a new owner. Swandown attacks a pet canary owned by one of her owner’s children and is re homed with Mrs. Spencer in Rose Hall.

=== Pug's Adventures ===
Pug is born in the Congo, Africa. Pug was captured as an infant, his mother was shot. He becomes the property of an Englishman headed for England. The voyage is treacherous and Pug receives a scarring blow to the head during a storm. One sailor, Jack takes charge of Pug's care while he remains on the ship. After arriving at the Englishman’s house, Jack and his wife have a disagreement which results in Pug staying only one night. Pug goes to London. Jack loses Pug in a crowd and a shopkeeper takes him in. A disagreement means Pug feels unable to stay with the shopkeeper. He wanders the streets of London and is taken in by a tailor. The tailor makes Pug clothes. The tailor’s master buys Pug and uses him to increase sales at his shop. The tailor, attempts to kidnap Pug in the hope of returning him to his master for a handsome sum, but Pug evades capture. Pug is taken to the household where Swandown’s abusers live. The children are as cruel to Pug as they were to Swandown. Pug is never entirely welcome and the cook sells him while he is asleep. Pug wakes to find himself a spectacle in a fair. Pug is beaten and poorly treated. One night, Jack sees and rescues Pug from the fair. While Jack is asleep, Pug is snatched by the same man that took Julio. Mrs. Spencer purchases Pug and he is taken to Rose Hall.

Elliot's third person narrator outlines how the rest of the animals lives at Rose Hall played out following their stories; Pug is shot accidentally by a fowler while he is climbing a tree, Poll dies a few days after (supposedly of over-eating), Swandown is replaced with a more beautiful Persian cat and is scarcely in the household, and Julio remains handsome and gets great pleasure from seeing Swandown occasionally.

=== Elliot's Address to the Reader ===
In this final section, Elliot addresses her young reader to remind them of the true nature of things outside the world of talking animals. She teaches them not to be over-indulgent, and to be respectful to vulnerable animals.

== Critical reception ==
Although the amount of contemporary criticism available on Elliot’s work is limited, the available criticism indicates that overall, her work was well received, and popular at the time it was published. Three or four years after the start of Elliot’s career, she had published a plethora of successful books under William Darton's publishing company.

In the introduction to Marjorie Moon’s bibliography of Elliott's work suggests that; ‘Elliott’s popularity lasted over half a century because her books were loved for their own sakes by the children for whom they were written.’ Elliott is described as a ‘good and inventive story-teller’ who was ‘remarkably prolific'

Her fame was not restricted to England, her works were reprinted in America, and many of her stories were translated into French and German. Therefore, Elliott was not only a writer of importance in her own country but also a writer of international renown. There are listings of Elliott’s works for sale in the Washington DC newspaper, The Daily Union, December 20, 1848 to support this claim. It is suggested by Moon that Elliot's work had a specific purpose; 'to teach children to live in a civilised, caring society by arousing their interest in other children with similar problems and difficulties; or else to encourage sympathy with those whose circumstances were very different and less privileged'.

Selections of moral tales written by Elliot are: Containing Self-Will: or, Young heads not the wisest, The Greedy Child Cured, Idle Ann; or the dunce reclaimed, The rainy day; or, The pleasures of employment, Containing the little meddler; or one fault leads to many. Despite Elliott’s popularity, some contemporary reviews criticise her for her literary inaccuracies. For example in the August 1820 edition of The Monthly Review Elliot's text Rural Employments, or a Peep into Village Concerns, designed to instruct the Minds of Children is given the following critique; 'This little book, which answers to its title, may excite the attention of children and furnish them with some useful information: - but a few trifling oversights should be corrected by the fair writer; as in page 15, ‘the first woollens made in England was in the year 1331:’ – page 47, ‘one can scarcely take a step, but we see something going forward’.

Likewise, in the January 1821 edition, another of Elliott’s works; Flowers of Instruction, a collection of verse is given similar criticism; ‘The subjects are here natural and well chosen; and, although the versification is not always correct, yet this little volume displays a variety and animation which render it agreeable’. Elliott’s work has not always been praised in this way; for example, Percy Muir includes Elliott in his Monstrous Regiment of female writers of children’s books.

Furthermore, Moon indicates that after the first two decades of her career, Elliott's works became 'duller and more overtly pious' with some of her later stories being 'little more than improving conversations'. When comparing Elliott with another prolific author of moral children's literature of the period, Maria Edgeworth, Moon highlights that Elliott 'lacked a sense of humour', that was a notable quality of Edgeworth's texts.
