= Neapolitan Mastiff =

Italian breed of dog

- Other names: Mastino Napoletano
- Origin: Italy
Traits
| Height | Males | 65–75 cm (26–30 in) |
| | Females | 60–68 cm (24–27 in) |
| Weight | Males | 60–70 kg (130–150 lb) |
| | Females | 50–60 kg (110–130 lb) |
- Coat: Short
- Colour: usually grey, lead grey or black
Kennel club standards
- Ente Nazionale della Cinofilia Italiana: standard
- Fédération Cynologique Internationale: standard

The Neapolitan Mastiff or Mastino Napoletano is an Italian breed of large dog of mastiff type. It was recognised as a breed by the Ente Nazionale della Cinofilia Italiana in 1949, and accepted by the Fédération Cynologique Internationale in 1956.

It descends from the traditional guard dogs of Southern Italy, and is closely related to the Cane Corso.

== History ==
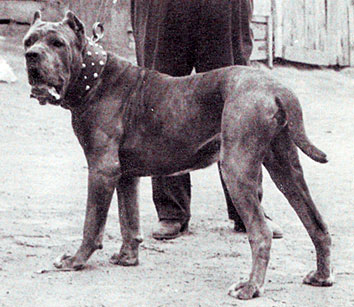
Scanziani's dog Siento, photographed in the 1950s

The Neapolitan Mastiff derives from the traditional catch and guard dogs of Southern Italy. Selection of the breed was begun in 1947 by Piero Scanziani, who had seen one at an exhibition in Naples in 1946. He drew up the first standard, which in 1949 was officially recognised by the Ente Nazionale della Cinofilia Italiana. It received full acceptance from the Fédération Cynologique Internationale in 1956.

== Characteristics ==
The Neapolitan Mastiff is large, massive and powerful, with a weight in the range 50–70 kg (110–150 lb) and a height at the withers of some 60–75 cm (24–30 in) The length of the body is about 15% greater than the height.

The skin is abundant and loose, particularly on the head where it hangs in heavy wrinkles. The preferred coat colours are black, grey and leaden, but mahogany, fawn, fulvous, hazelnut, dove-grey and isabelline are also acceptable; all coats may be brindled, and minor white markings on the toes and chest are tolerated.

The dogs may be expected to live for up to 10 years. Median lifespan is reported to be 9.3 years, much lower the median for all dogs, 12.5 years.
