= Lagotto Romagnolo =

Italian breed of dog

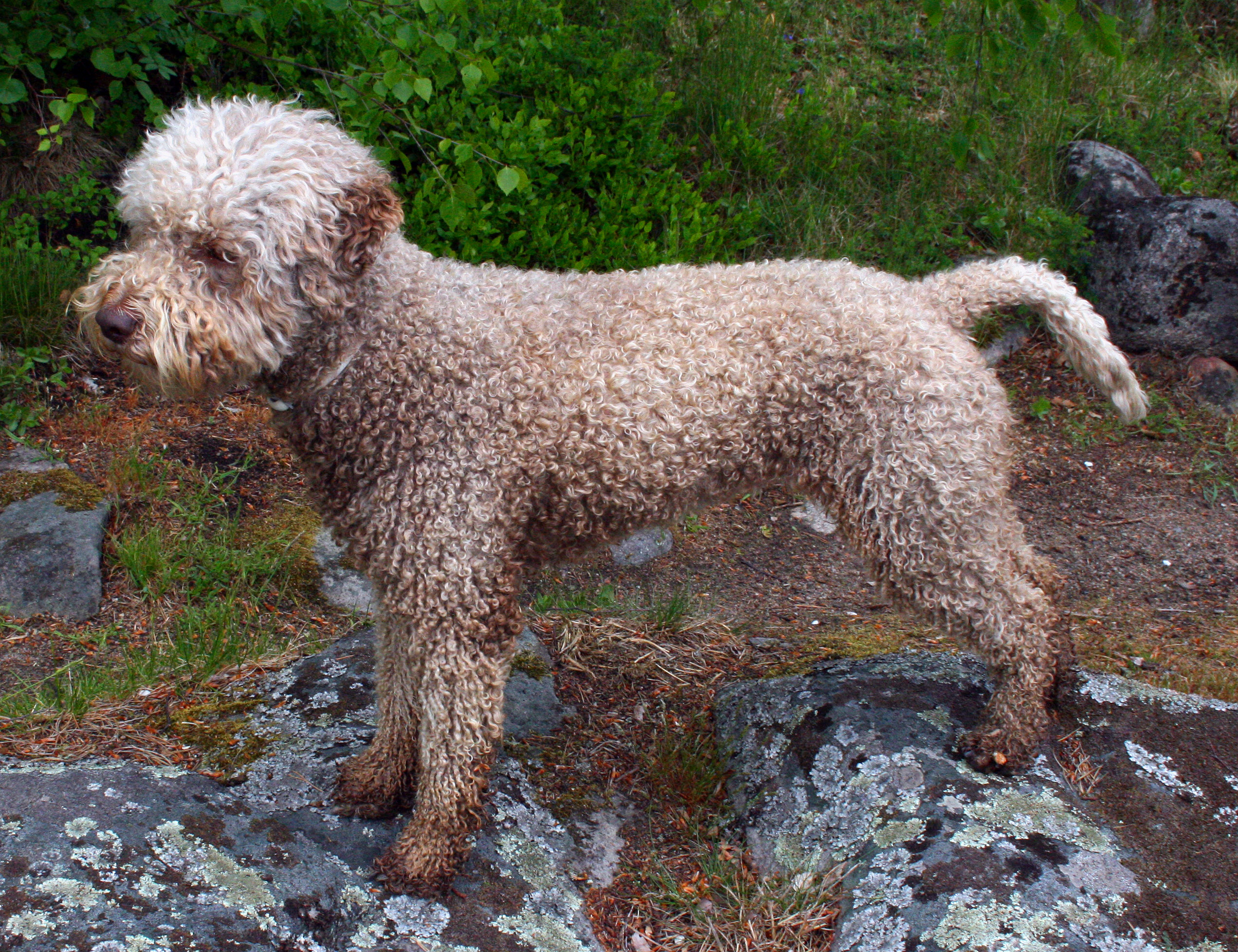
- Two-year-old bitch
- Other names: Càn Lagòt
- Origin: Italy
Traits
Height	Males	43–48 cm
	Females	41–46 cm
Weight	Males	13–16 kg
	Females	11–14 kg
Kennel club standards
- Ente Nazionale della Cinofilia Italiana: standard
- Fédération Cynologique Internationale: standard

The Lagotto Romagnolo (Note: Italian pronunciation: [laˈɡɔtto romaɲˈɲɔːlo]; plural: Lagotti Romagnoli) is an Italian breed of dog. It is a traditional breed of the once-extensive marshlands of the Delta del Po, in the eastern part of the Emilia-Romagna region of Italy, where it was used as a gun dog, specifically as a water retriever. After the drainage of large areas of wetland habitat in its area of origin in the nineteenth and twentieth centuries, it came to be more often used to hunt for truffles. In the twenty-first century it may be kept as a companion animal.

== History ==
The Lagotto originated in the once-extensive marshlands and lagoons of the Delta del Po, in areas such as Comacchio and Ravenna, in the eastern part of the historical Romagna region of Italy, now part of Emilia-Romagna. It has been known since the sixteenth century, but did not become widespread until the nineteenth.

Dogs showing some similarity to the modern Lagotto appear in various paintings from northern Italy. One is the small dog behind the legs of Ludovico III Gonzaga, Marquis of Mantua, in the fresco on the west wall of the Camera degli Sposi in the Ducal Palace of Mantova – now in Lombardy – painted between 1465 and 1474 by Andrea Mantegna. Another, from almost two hundred years later, is shown in the portrait by Paolo Antonio Barbieri of his sister and his brother – the painter Il Guercino – with a dog and a cat.

Its traditional function was as a gun dog, specifically a water retriever, bringing shot game back to dry land or to punts on the water. Since the drainage of large areas of wetland habitat in its area of origin, it has come to be more often used to hunt for truffles.

In the 1970s the number of the dogs fell heavily, and the breed came close to extinction. A small group of breeders was formed and began selective breeding to preserve the traditional type; a breed association – the Club Italiano Lagotto – was established in Imola in 1988. In 1992 a breed standard was approved and the Lagotto was recognised by the Ente Nazionale della Cinofilia Italiana.

It was provisionally accepted by the Fédération Cynologique Internationale in 1995, and received full acceptance in 2005. In the ten years from 2015 to 2024, the annual number of new registrations recorded by the Ente Nazionale della Cinofilia Italiana varied between 2207 and 5470, with a total for the period of just under 35000 – an average of 3500 per year.

== Characteristics ==
The Lagotto is of small to medium size, rarely over 50 cm at the withers, powerfully built and of rustic appearance. It is roughly square in outline, the body length more or less equal to the height. The coat is thick, wool-like and tightly curled into ringlets. It may be completely off-white, or off-white with orange or brown patches or roaning, or solid orange or brown either with or without white markings.

A Lagotto usually lives for about fifteen years. Neurological disorders that have been identified in the breed include cerebellar abiotrophy and idiopathic epilepsy.

== Use ==
The Lagotto was formerly used principally as a gun dog, specifically as a water retriever. After the drainage of large areas of wetland habitat in its area of origin in the late nineteenth and early twentieth centuries, it came to be more often used to hunt for truffles. In the twenty-first century it may be kept as a companion animal.

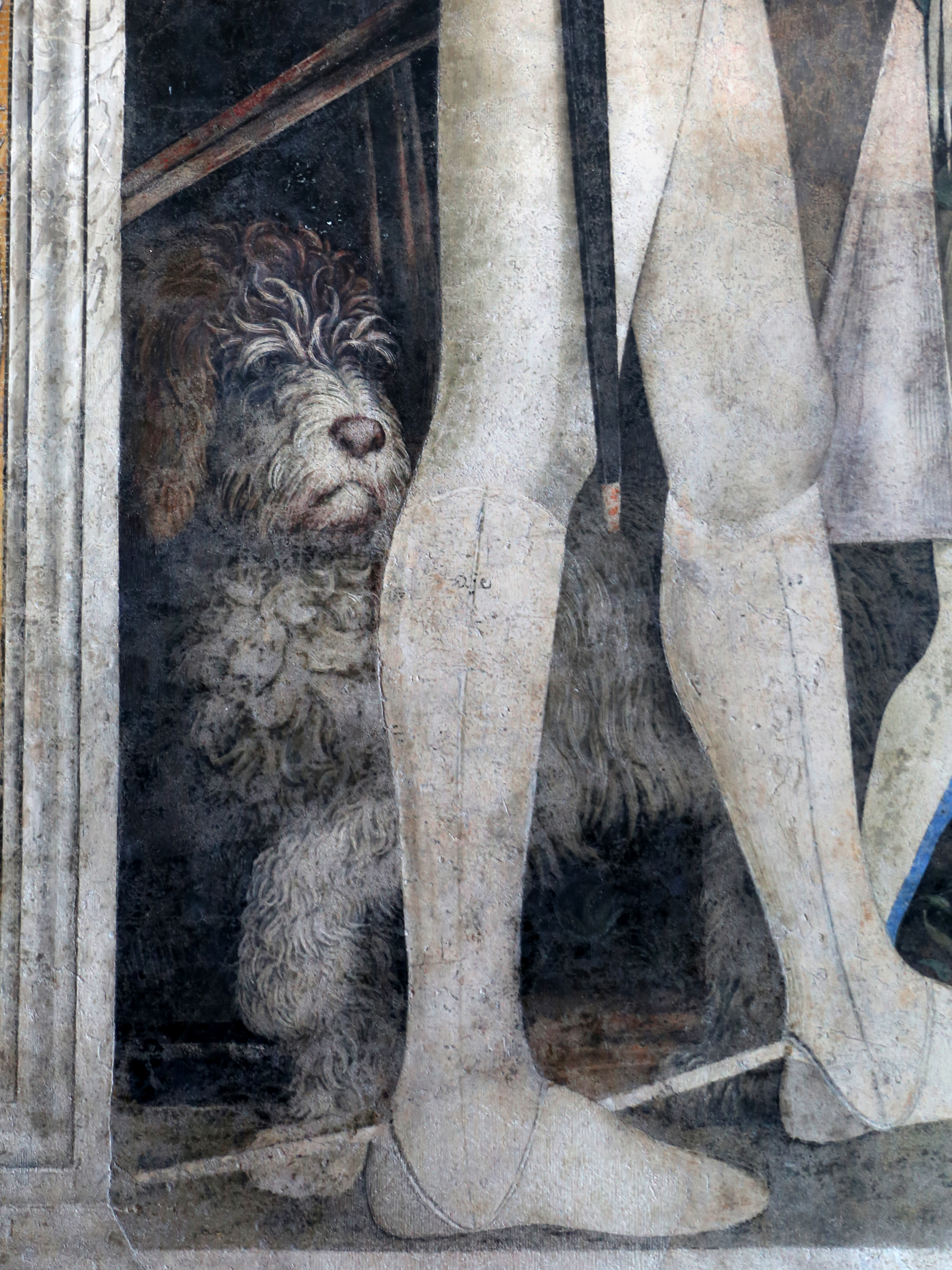
Andrea Mantegna, Camera degli Sposi, Mantova, west wall, detail (about 1470)

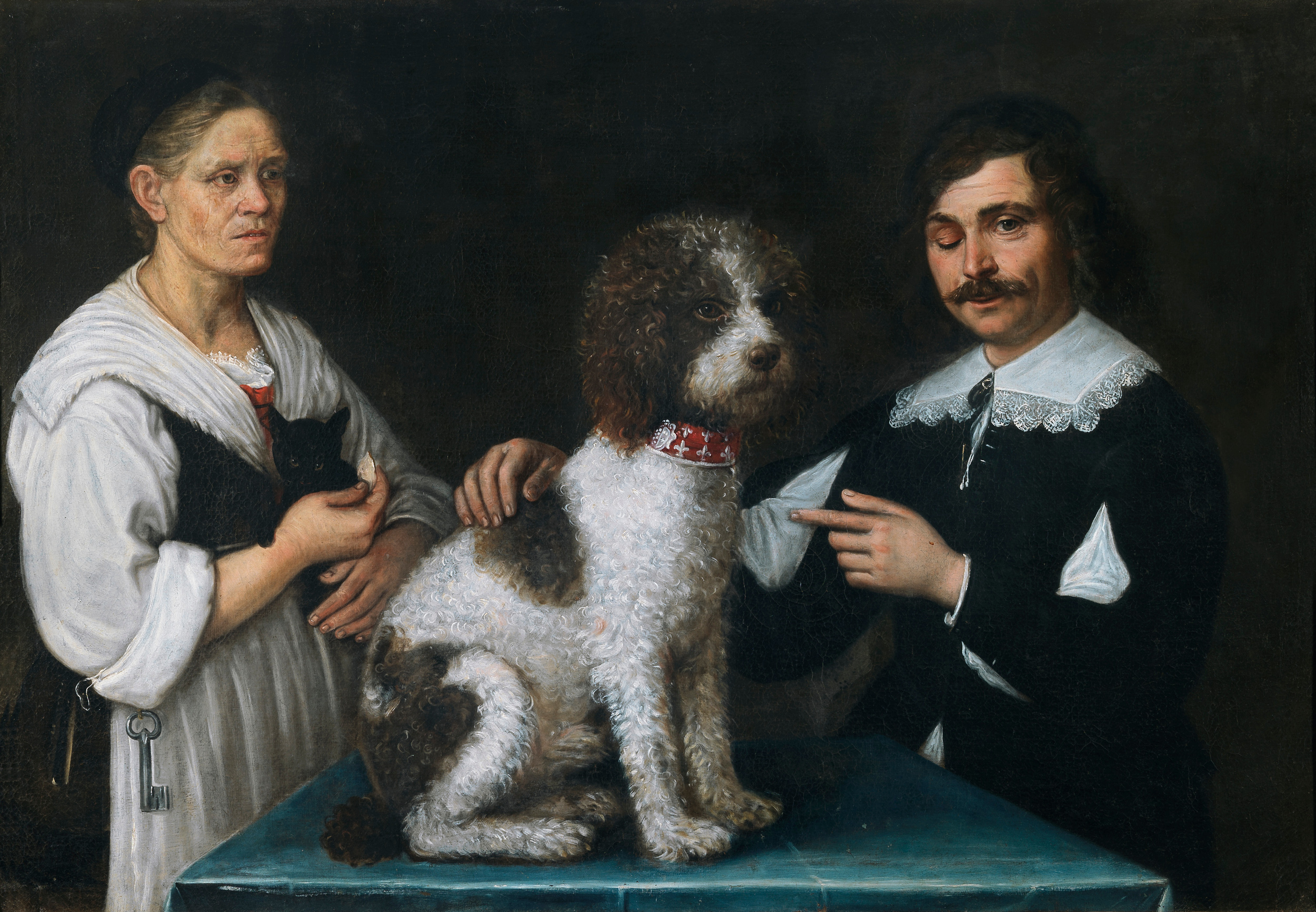
Paolo Antonio Barbieri, portrait of his sister and brother (before 1649)

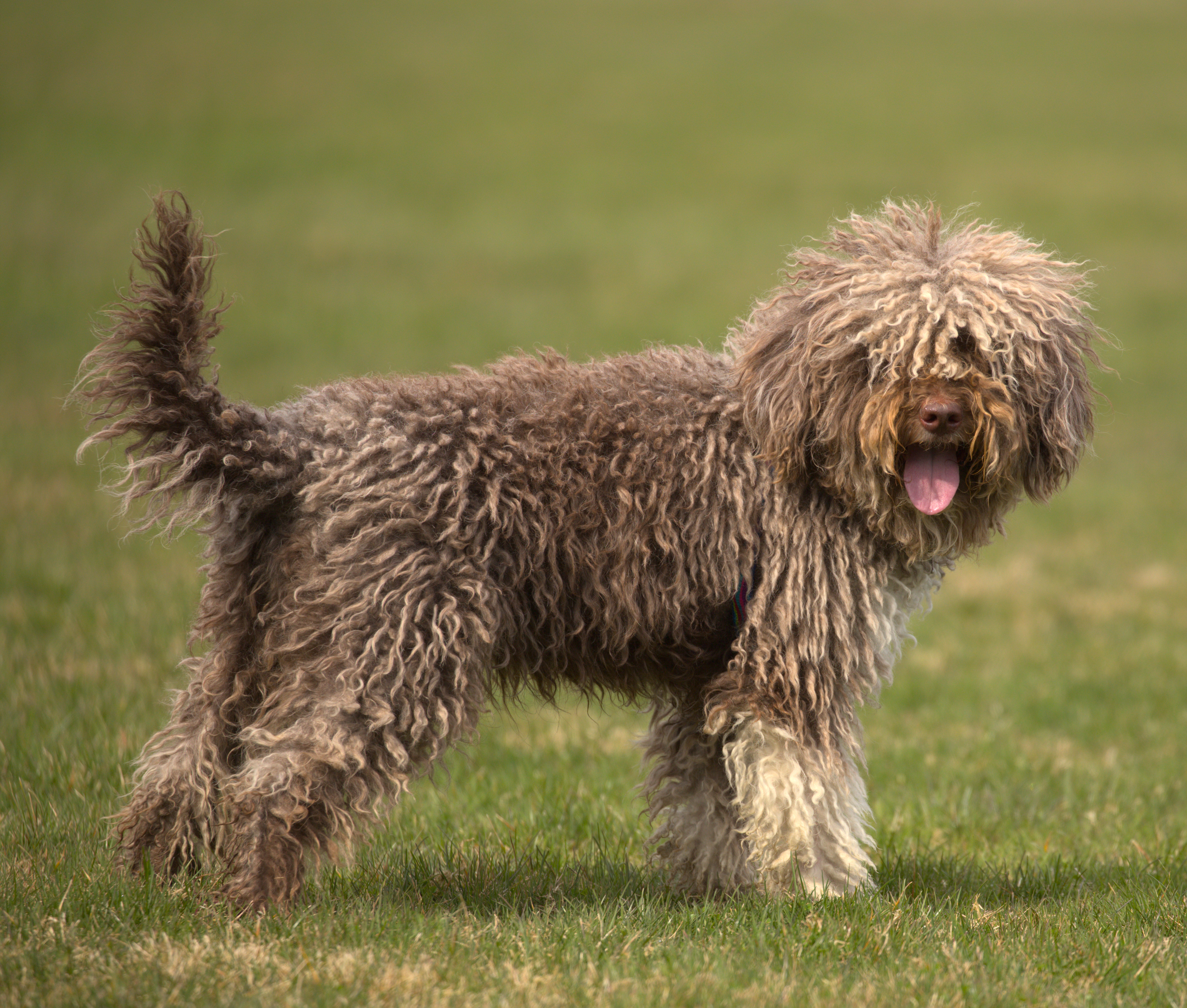
Three-year-old bitch

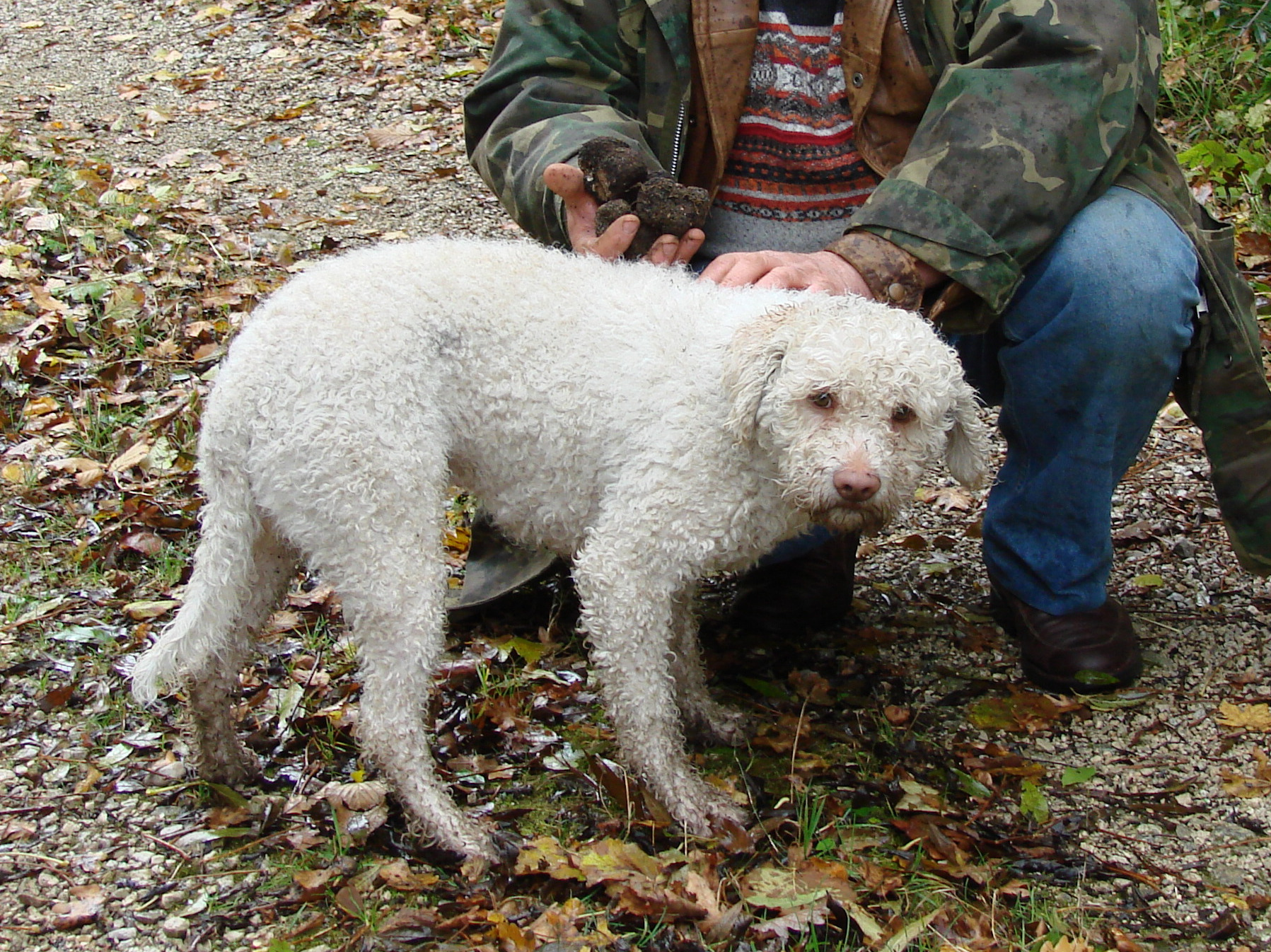
Truffle hunting
