= Bracco Italiano =

Italian breed of gun dog

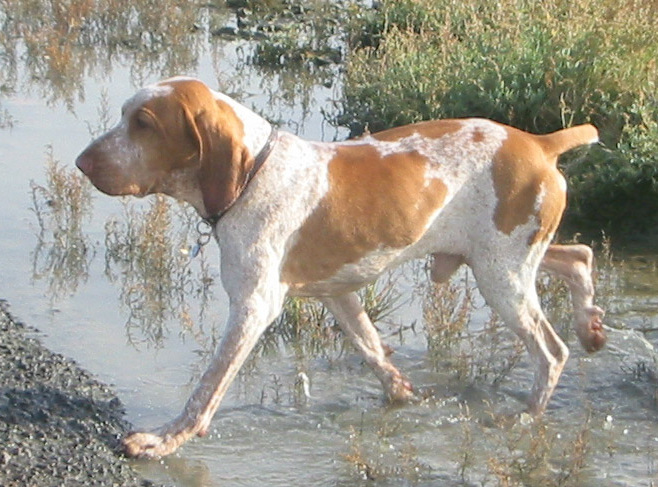
- Other names: Italian Pointer; Italian Pointing Dog
- Origin: Italy
Traits
Height	Males	preferred: 58–67 cm (23–26 in)
	Females	preferred: 55–62 cm (22–24 in)
- Weight: 25–40 kg (55–90 lb)
- Coat: short, dense and glossy
- Colour: white; white with orange, amber or chestnut patches; orange roan; liver roan
Kennel club standards
- Ente Nazionale della Cinofilia Italiana: standard
- Fédération Cynologique Internationale: standard

The Bracco Italiano (Note: Italian pronunciation: [ˈbrakko itaˈljaːno]) is an Italian breed of pointing dog.

== History ==
The Bracco Italiano is the traditional pointer of the Italian peninsula. Dogs showing similarities to the modern breed appear in paintings as far back as the fourteenth century.

The first dog registered in the Libro delle Origini of the Kennel Club Italiano, established in 1882, was a Bracco Italiano. At this time there were two sub-types: the larger and heavier bracco nobile or bracco di gran sangue and the smaller and lighter bracco comune or bracchetto. A breed standard for the larger type was drawn up by Ferdinando Delor in the 1890s.

Early in 1949 a breed standard was approved by the Ente Nazionale della Cinofilia Italiana – as the national kennel club had by then been renamed – and later that year a breed society was formed: the Società Amatori Bracco Italiano. The breed was fully accepted by the Fédération Cynologique Internationale in 1956.

In the 41 years from 1970 to 2011, a total of 24613 of the dogs were registered. From 2010 to 2018 there were approximately 700 new registrations per year in Italy, of which in every year the majority were of white-and-orange colouration.

== Characteristics ==
The Bracco Italiano is roughly square in outline – the height at the withers is almost as great as the length of the body. The head is large, with long ears and long upper lips that hang below the lower jaw. Height at the withers is in the range 55 to 67 cm, with a preferred range of 55 to 62 cm for bitches and 58 to 67 cm for dogs; body weights vary in proportion to height, from about 25 to 40 kg.

The coat is dense and short. Under the international breed standard of the Fédération Cynologique Internationale, it may be white; or white with patches of orange, dark amber or brown; or orange or liver roan. Any other colour, including black or tricolour markings, is considered disqualifying fault. The Ente Nazionale della Cinofilia Italiana classes the dogs in one of two colours only, bianco-arancio ('white-and-orange') and roano-marrone ('chestnut roan').

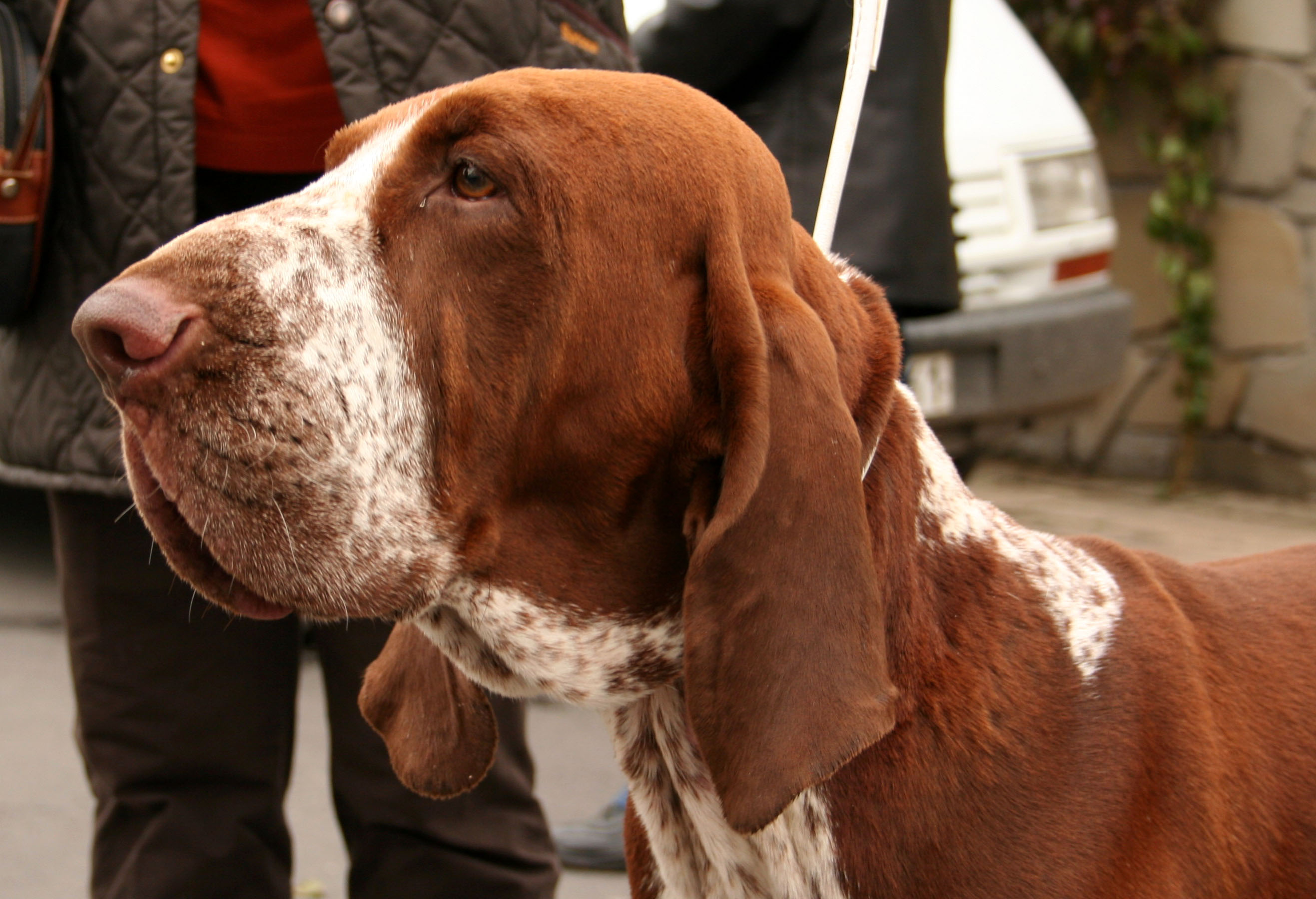
White with dark amber

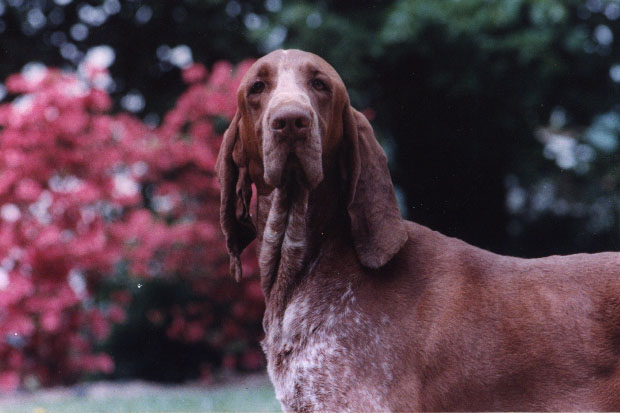
Liver roan
