= Spinone Italiano =

Italian breed of hunting dog

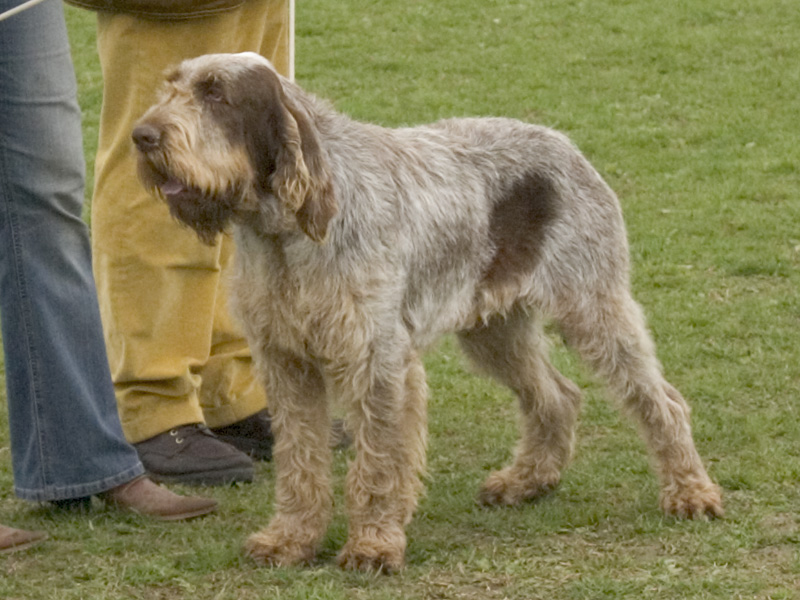
- Brown roan
- Other names: Spinone; Bracco Spinoso; Italian Spinone; Italian Griffon; Italian Wire-haired Pointer; Italian Coarse-haired Pointer
- Origin: Italy
Traits
Height	Males	60–70 cm (24–28 in)
	Females	58–65 cm (23–26 in)
Weight	Males	32–37 kg (71–82 lb)
	Females	28–30 kg (62–66 lb)
- Coat: rough, thick and flat
- Colour: solid white, white with brown or orange markings, or brown or orange roan
Kennel club standards
- Ente Nazionale della Cinofilia Italiana: standard
- Fédération Cynologique Internationale: standard

The Spinone Italiano (Note: Italian pronunciation: [spiˈnoːne itaˈljaːno]; plural Spinoni Italiani, pronounced [spiˈnoːni itaˈljaːni]) is an Italian breed of hunting dog, traditionally used for tracking, for pointing and for retrieving game.

== History ==
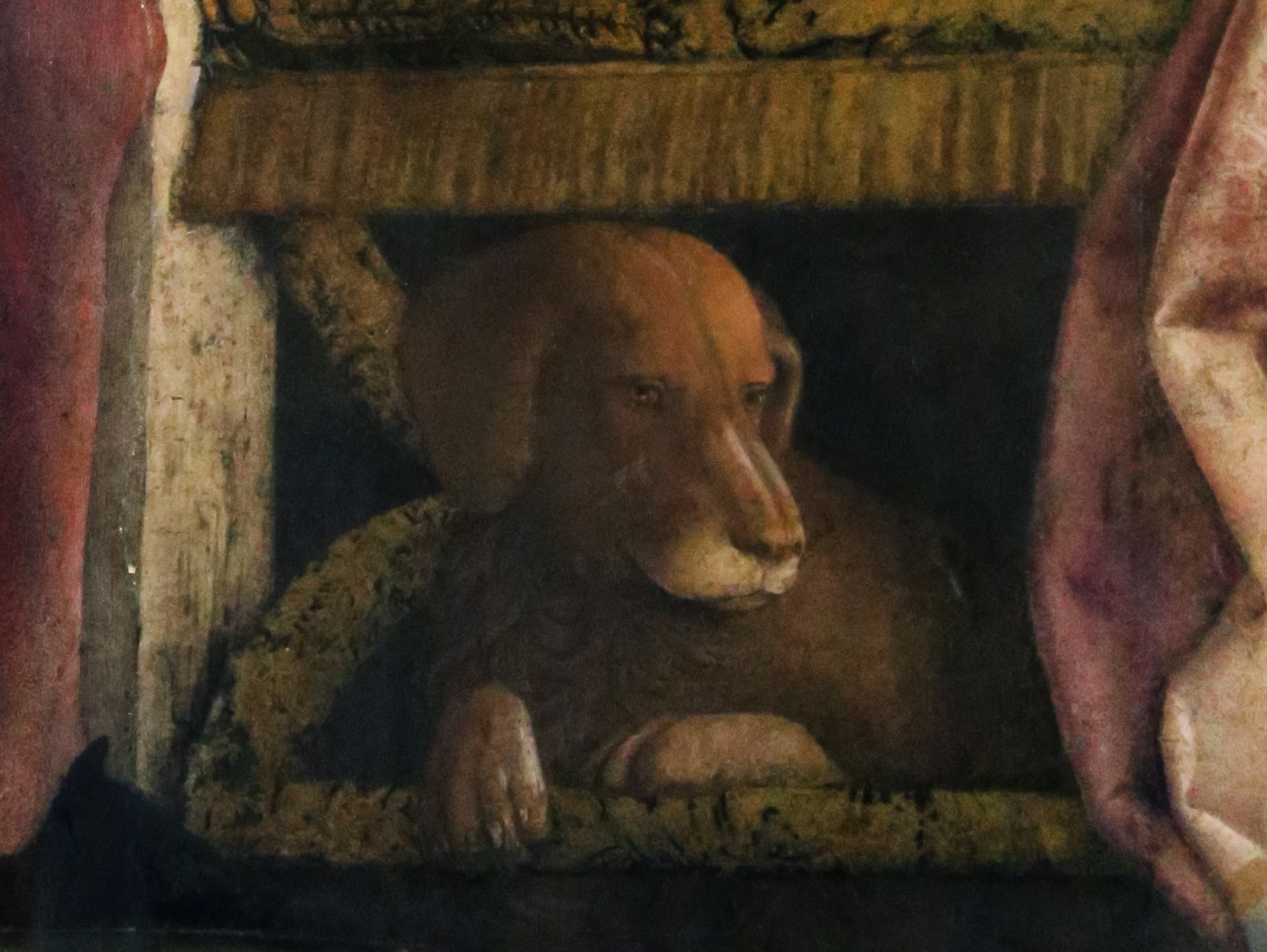
Detail of a fresco by Andrea Mantegna in the Camera degli Sposi of the Palazzo Ducale of Mantua, circa 1470

The origins of the Spinone are unknown. Rough-haired dogs of pointer type have been present in the Italian peninsula at least since the Renaissance. In a fresco painted by Andrea Mantegna in about 1470 in the Camera degli Sposi of the Ducal Palace of Mantua, in Lombardy, in northern Italy, a dog of this kind is shown lying under the chair of the duke, Ludovico III Gonzaga. Jacques Espée de Sélincourt, in his Le Parfait Chasseur of 1683, says of griffon dogs that "the best come from Italy and from Piedmont".

The modern Spinone originated in Piedmont, in north-western Italy, in the nineteenth century and was for some time the most important hunting breed of that region. During the Second World War it was much used by the partisans, both to track enemies and to carry food. After the War, breed numbers were much reduced; a breed society, the Famiglia dello Spinone, was formed in 1949, and the breed was reconstituted from about 1950 onwards. The Spinone was definitively accepted by the Fédération Cynologique Internationale in 1955. A second breed society, the Club Italiano Spinoni, was established in 1973.

In the period from 2010 to 2018, new registrations in Italy varied from about 400 to about 650 per year; in every year, the orange-and-white colouring represented slightly over half of the total.

== Characteristics ==
The Spinone is roughly square in outline when seen from the side – the length of the body is approximately equal to the height at the withers. It is a strong, well-muscled and solidly-built dog suitable for hunting over any kind of ground. It swims well and enters cold or deep water without hesitation.

The coat is rough, thick and flat, with little undercoat; it is about 4 to 6 cm (1.5 to 2.5 in) long, rather shorter on the head, feet and front of the legs. Hair on the eyebrows and lips is longer and stiffer, thus forming a thick moustache and beard. It may be: solid white; white with orange speckling or markings; white with chestnut brown markings; or brown or orange roan.

A 2024 UK study found a median lifespan of 11.9 years for the breed, close to the median of 12.5 for all dogs. Neurological disorders that have been identified in the breed include cerebellar abiotrophy and idiopathic epilepsy.

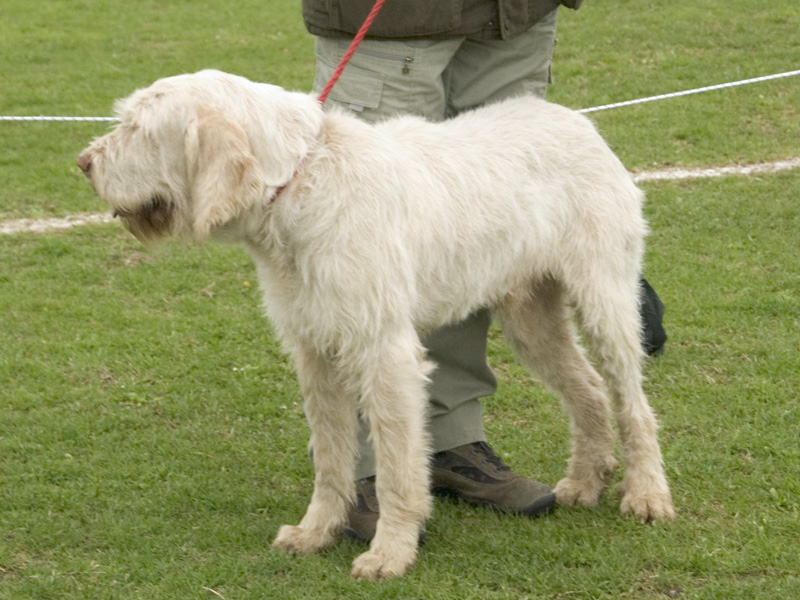
Solid white

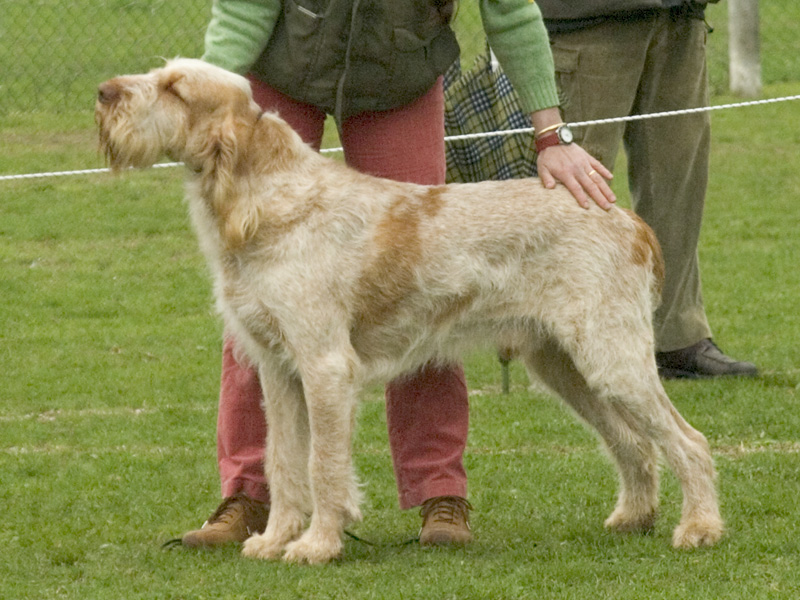
Orange roan with orange markings
