= Cane Corso =

Italian breed of mastiff

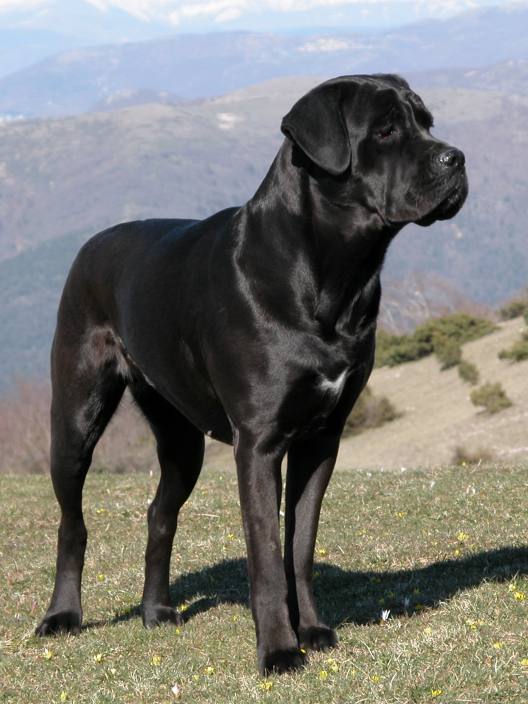
- Other names: Cane Corso Italiano; Italian Mastiff
- Origin: Italy
Traits
Height	Males	62–70 cm (24–28 in)
	Females	58–66 cm (23–26 in)
Weight	Males	45–50 kg (100–110 lb)
	Females	40–45 kg (90–100 lb)
- Coat: short, dense, lustrous
- Colour: black; lead-grey, light grey or slate-grey; dark fawn, light fawn or stag red; dark wheaten ('fromentino')
Kennel club standards
- Ente Nazionale della Cinofilia Italiana: standard
- Fédération Cynologique Internationale: standard

The Cane Corso (Note: Italian: [ˈkaːne ˈkɔrso]; plural: Cani Corsi; the word corso is thought to derive from the Latin cŏhors, meaning "a place enclosed around, a court, enclosure, yard, pen, etc., especially for cattle, poultry".) is an Italian breed of mastiff. It is usually kept as a companion dog or guard dog; it may also be used to protect livestock. In the past it was used both for hunting large game and for herding cattle.

== History ==
According to the breed standard of the Fédération Cynologique Internationale, the Cane Corso was once distributed throughout much of the Italian peninsula, but in the recent past was found only in Puglia, in southern Italy. After the collapse of the masseria system of share-cropping in the 1960s, the dogs became rare. The modern breed derives from selective breeding from about 1980 of a few surviving animals.

A breed society, the Società Amatori Cane Corso, was formed in 1983. The breed was recognised by the Ente Nazionale della Cinofilia Italiana in 1994; it was provisionally accepted by the Fédération Cynologique Internationale in 1996, and received full acceptance in 2007. It was recognised by the American Kennel Club of the United States in 2010.

The number of annual registrations in Italy in the period 2011–2019 was in the range of 3000–4250.

== Characteristics ==
The Cane Corso is a large dog of molossoid type, strong and muscular but not without elegance; it is closely related to the Neapolitan Mastiff. According to the international standard, dogs should stand some 62–70 cm at the withers and weigh 45–50 kg; bitches are about 4 cm smaller, and weigh some 5 kg less. The head is large, slightly over one third of the height at the withers in length, with a well-defined stop. The top of the cranium is flat and slightly convergent to the muzzle. The eyes are oval in shape, and set well apart. The iris of the eye should be as dark as possible.

The coat is short, dense and lustrous. It may be black, various shades of grey (lead-grey, light grey or slate-grey) or fawn (dark fawn, light fawn or stag red), or dark wheaten ('fromentino'); it may be brindled. Minor white markings on the chest, the feet or the nose are tolerated.

The Cane Corso is genetically pre-disposed to elbow and hip dysplasia, to patellar luxation and to retinal dysplasia. It has above-average susceptibility to demodicosis, ectropion, entropion, gastric dilatation volvulus (bloat), hypothyroidism, idiopathic epilepsy, mycotic otitis and nictitans gland prolapse ("cherry eye").

In 2017 a study of 232 of the dogs from 25 countries found an average lifespan of 9.3 years, varying with different coat colours. The longest-lived were black brindle (10.3 years), followed by: brindle (10.1 years); grey brindle (9.8 years); black, fawn and grey (all 9.0 years); and dogs of other colours (8.1 years). The median lifespan is also reported as 8.1 and as 9 years.

== Use ==
The Cane Corso is usually kept as a companion dog or guard dog; it may also be used to protect livestock. In the past it was used both for hunting large game and for herding cattle.

It is subject to a working trial: in order to qualify for registration, dogs must show tranquillity in the presence of inoffensive strangers, indifference to gunfire, and aggressive defence of the owner against an attacker.

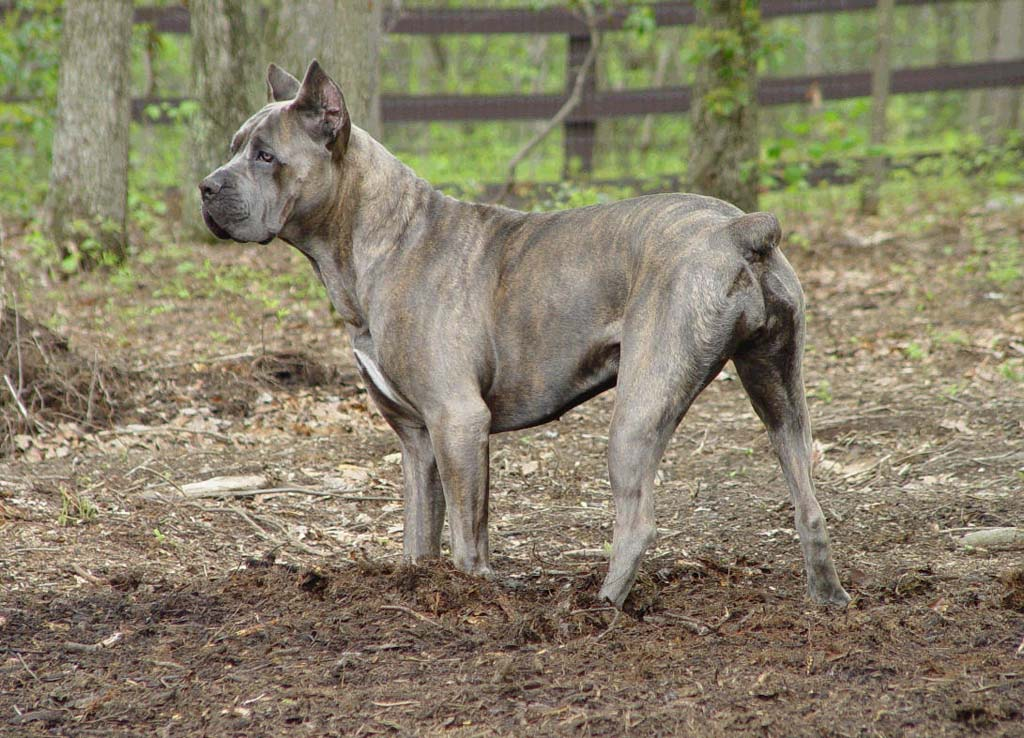
Grey brindle

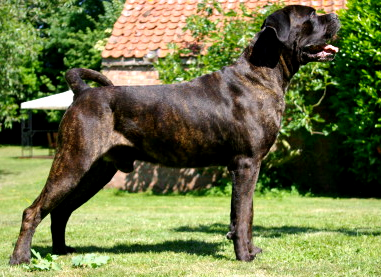
Brown brindle

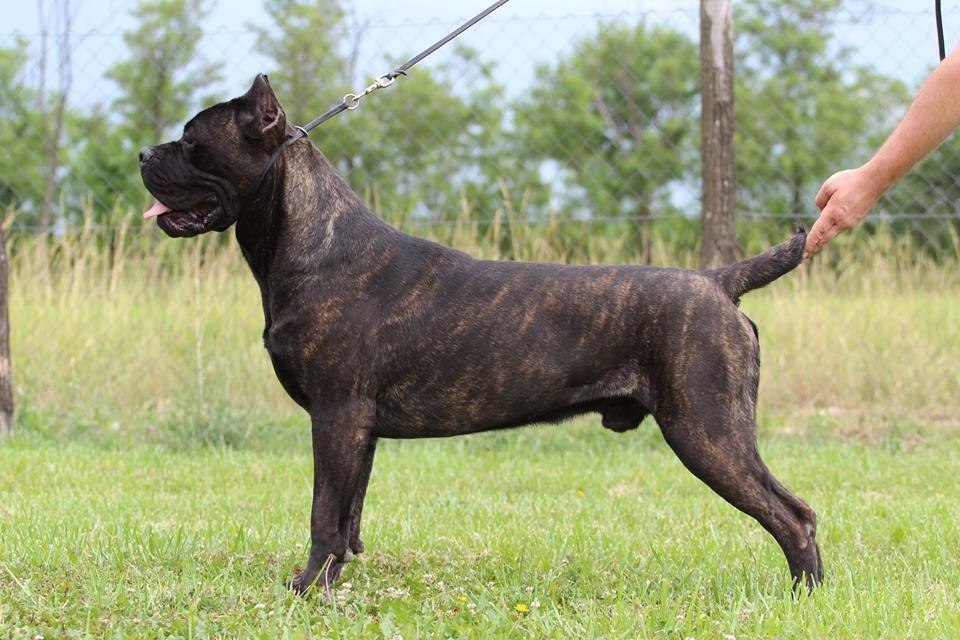
Black brindle

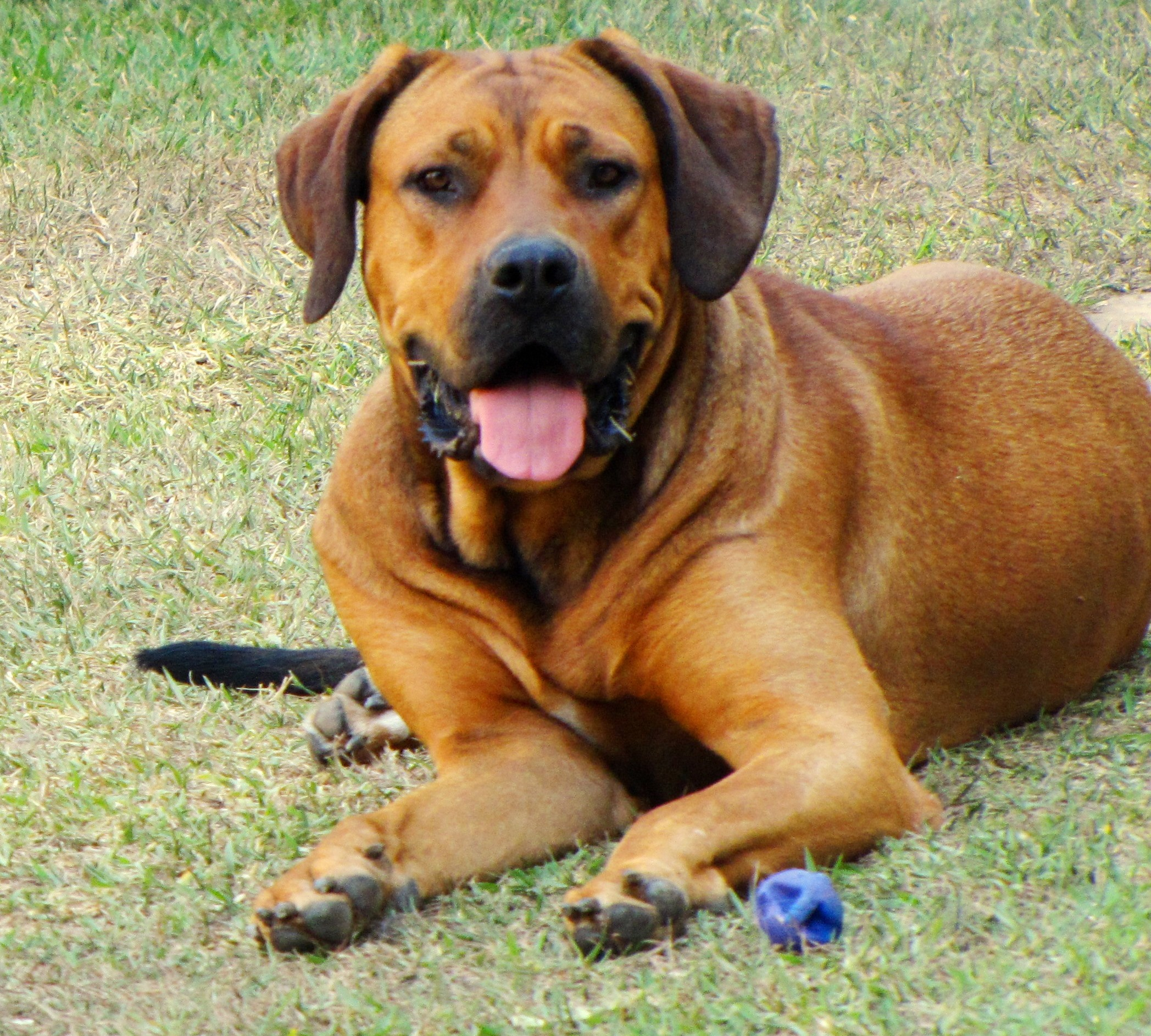
Fawn
