= Ente Nazionale della Cinofilia Italiana =

Italian dog association

Italian Kennel Club
- Abbreviation: ENCI
- Formation: 1882
- Founders: Carlo Borromeo; Emilio Belgioioso d'Este; Ferdinando Delor; Carlo Biffi; Luigi Radice
- Region served: Italy
- President: Dino Muto
- Website: enci.it

The Ente Nazionale della Cinofilia Italiana, (Note: meaning roughly "Italian national organisation for cynology".) usually known as the ENCI, is the national organisation responsible for the recognition, standardisation and registration of pedigree dogs in Italy. It is sometimes called the Italian Kennel Club.

The association provides judging for dog shows and many other services relating to dog showing. The club was founded in 1882 as the Kennel Club Italiano. It is a full member of the Fédération Cynologique Internationale. In 1992 it received the approval of the Ministero delle Politiche Agricole Alimentari e Forestali, the Italian ministry of agriculture; it is the only organisation approved to register dog breeds. It has offices in all regions of Italy, and a head office in Milan.

In 2009 there were approximately 160000 dogs registered in the national stud book; the association organised about 2000 events, including about 1200 working trials and some 400 dog shows. It gives special attention to the sixteen recognised breeds originating in Italy: the Bergamasco Shepherd Dog, the Bolognese, the Bracco Italiano, the Cane Corso, the Cirneco dell'Etna, the Italian Greyhound, the Lagotto Romagnolo, the Maltese, the Maremmano-Abruzzese Sheepdog, the Neapolitan Mastiff, the Segugio dell'Appennino, the Segugio Italiano a Pelo Forte, the Segugio Italiano a Pelo Raso, the Segugio Maremmano, the Spinone Italiano and the Volpino Italiano.
