= Segugio Italiano a Pelo Raso =

Italian breed of dog

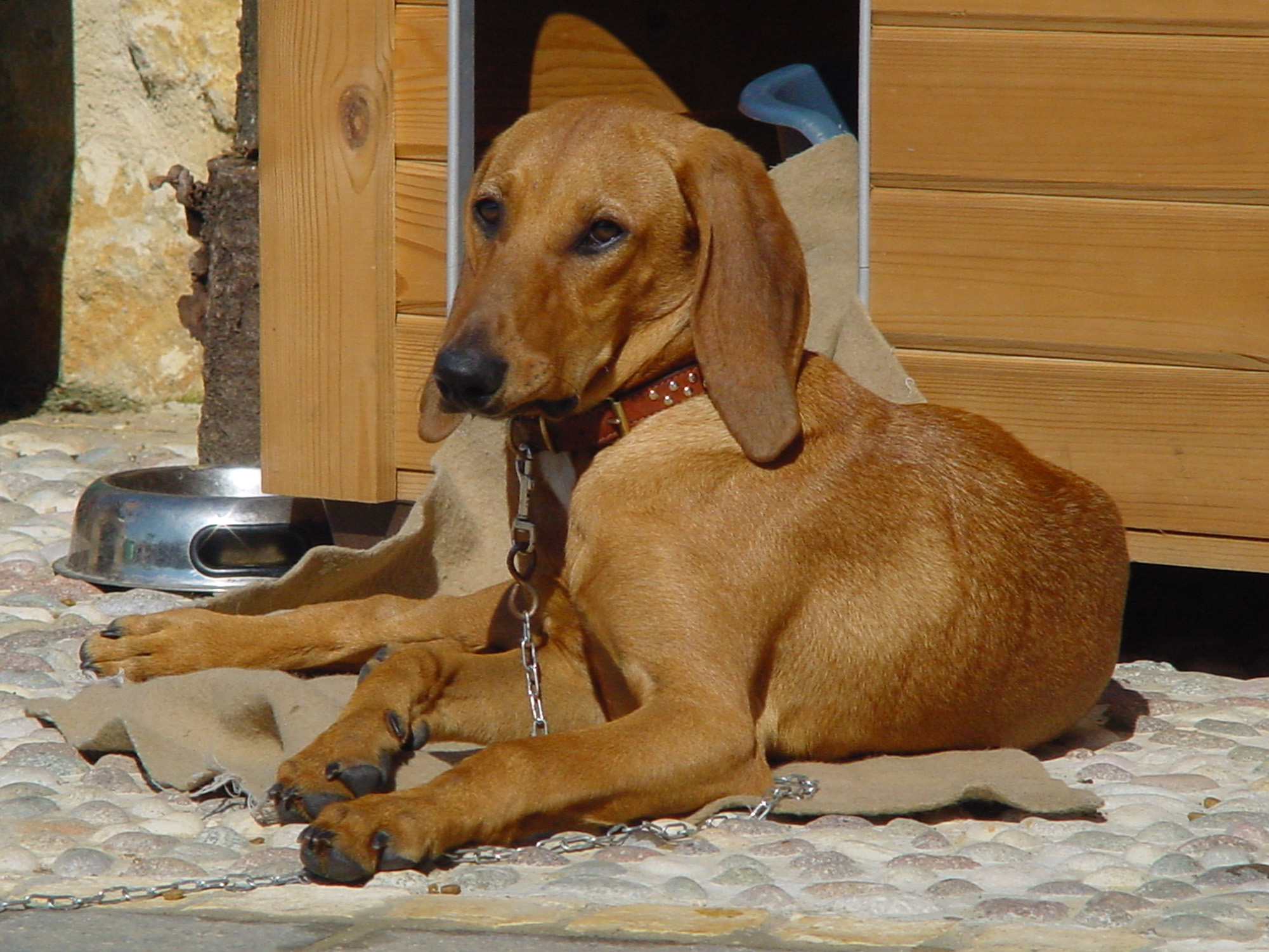

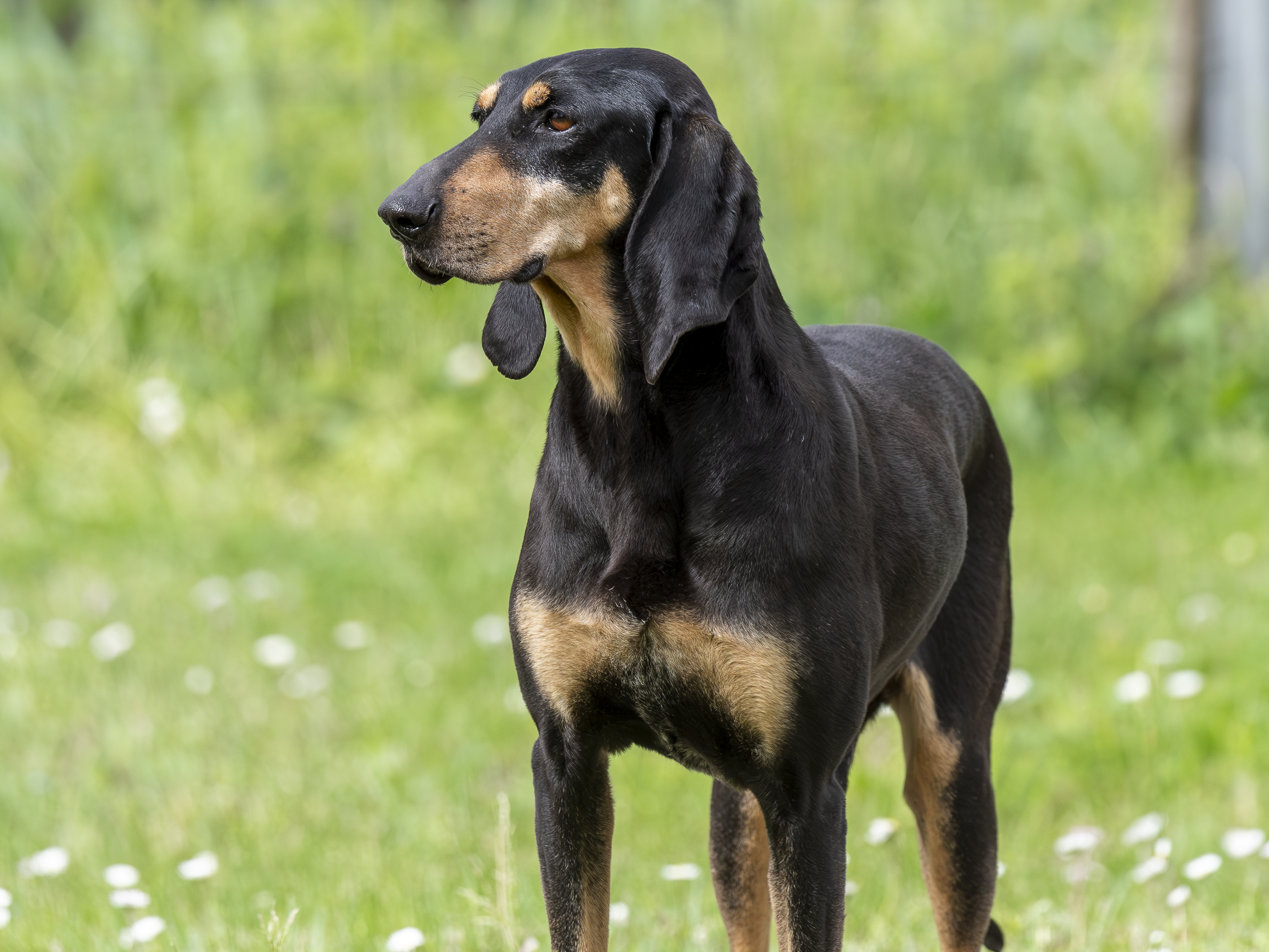
- Other names: Italian Short-haired Segugio; Italian Smooth-haired Segugio
- Origin: Italy
Traits
Height	Males	52–58 cm (20–23 in)
	Females	48–56 cm (19–22 in)
- Weight: 20–28 kg (44–62 lb)
- Coat: short and smooth over the entire body
- Colour: fawn, from dark red to very pale; black-and-tan
Kennel club standards
- Ente Nazionale della Cinofilia Italiana: standard
- Fédération Cynologique Internationale: standard

The Segugio Italiano a Pelo Raso or Italian Short-haired Segugio is an Italian breed of smooth-haired dog of scent hound type. It is one of two types of Segugio Italiano, the other being the wire-haired Segugio Italiano a Pelo Forte, which – apart from the coat type – is closely similar but slightly larger. Both are genetically close to the other two Italian scent hound breeds, the Segugio Maremmano and the Segugio dell'Appennino.

It is traditionally used for hunting hare, but may also be used in boar hunts. In 2009 there were 4500 new registrations in the national stud-book.

== History ==
The origins of the breed are unknown but are believed to be ancient. In some Ancient Roman statues, including two in the Vatican Museums in Rome and one in the National Archaeological Museum in Naples, Diana the Huntress is portrayed accompanied by a hunting dog which is thought to show some similarity to the modern Segugio Italiano.

Two similar skeletons of dogs of greyhound or scent hound type from a seventh-century Lombard necropolis at Povegliano in the province of Verona were described in 1995; they show some morphological similarity to the modern Segugio, except that they are taller, with a height at the withers estimated at 64 cm.

Dogs of this type were much used during the Italian Renaissance in elaborate hunts with a large number of hunt servants and hunt followers mounted on horseback.

Dogs similar to the modern Segugio – of both smooth-haired and rough-haired type – were shown in Milan in 1886, but there was at this time no clear distinction of breed. In 1920 a breed club, the Società Italiana Amatori del Segugio e del Cane da Tana, was formed in Lodi, and a breed standard was drawn up; the society was dissolved in 1939, shortly before the outbreak of the Second World War, after restrictive legislation was passed by the Fascist government. By the end of the war the breed was at risk of disappearing.

A new breed society was formed in 1947, with the name Società Italiana Pro Segugio; in that year, the total number registered in the two national stud-books (LOI and LIR) was 69. The breed standard was revised by the cynologist Giuseppe Solaro. In 1948 there were 120 new registrations.

The smooth-haired breed was fully accepted by the Fédération Cynologique Internationale in 1993. In 2015 there were 3647 new registrations in the national stud-book.

Genetic comparisons have found it to be almost indistinguishable from the Segugio Italiano a Pelo Forte, and also to be genetically close to the other two Italian scent hound breeds, the Segugio Maremmano and the Segugio dell'Appennino. Dogs of this breed have been exported to a number of countries.

== Characteristics ==
The Segugio Italiano a Pelo Raso is of medium size. Apart from the coat type, it is very similar to the wire-haired Segugio, but is slightly smaller. Dogs usually stand between 50 and 58 cm at the withers, bitches about 2 cm less; body weights are in the range 20–28 kg in both sexes. The length of the body is approximately the same as the height at the withers, so that the body appears roughly square in shape when seen from the side.

The coat is short and smooth over the whole body. Two coat colours are recognised: any shade of fawn-coloured, varying from deep fox-red to very pale; and black-and-tan. Some white markings to the face and chest are tolerated.

It displays some characteristics of both scent hounds and sight hounds. It has the long legs, tucked-up loins and roached (slightly convex) back typical of a sight hound, while the head has scent hound features including the low-set pendulous ears. It has a long, tapering muzzle with thin lips that are not pendulous. The tail is long and tapered, and is usually carried high when hunting, making it easy to see where the dog is.

== Use ==
It has been bred as a hunting dog. Its traditional quarry is hare, but it may also be used to hunt boar; it hunts well alone, in small groups or in packs, with the hunters remaining stationary and the hounds driving game towards their guns. It has a keen scenting ability and considerable stamina when hunting, staying in the field for up to twelve hours without a break; like most scent hounds it bays loudly when pursuing game. Once on a scent trail it displays a single-minded dedication to following it, much like the Bloodhound, although unlike the latter the Segugio also captures and kills game.

In the twenty-first century it is increasingly kept as a companion dog.
