= Segugio dell'Appennino =

Italian breed of dog

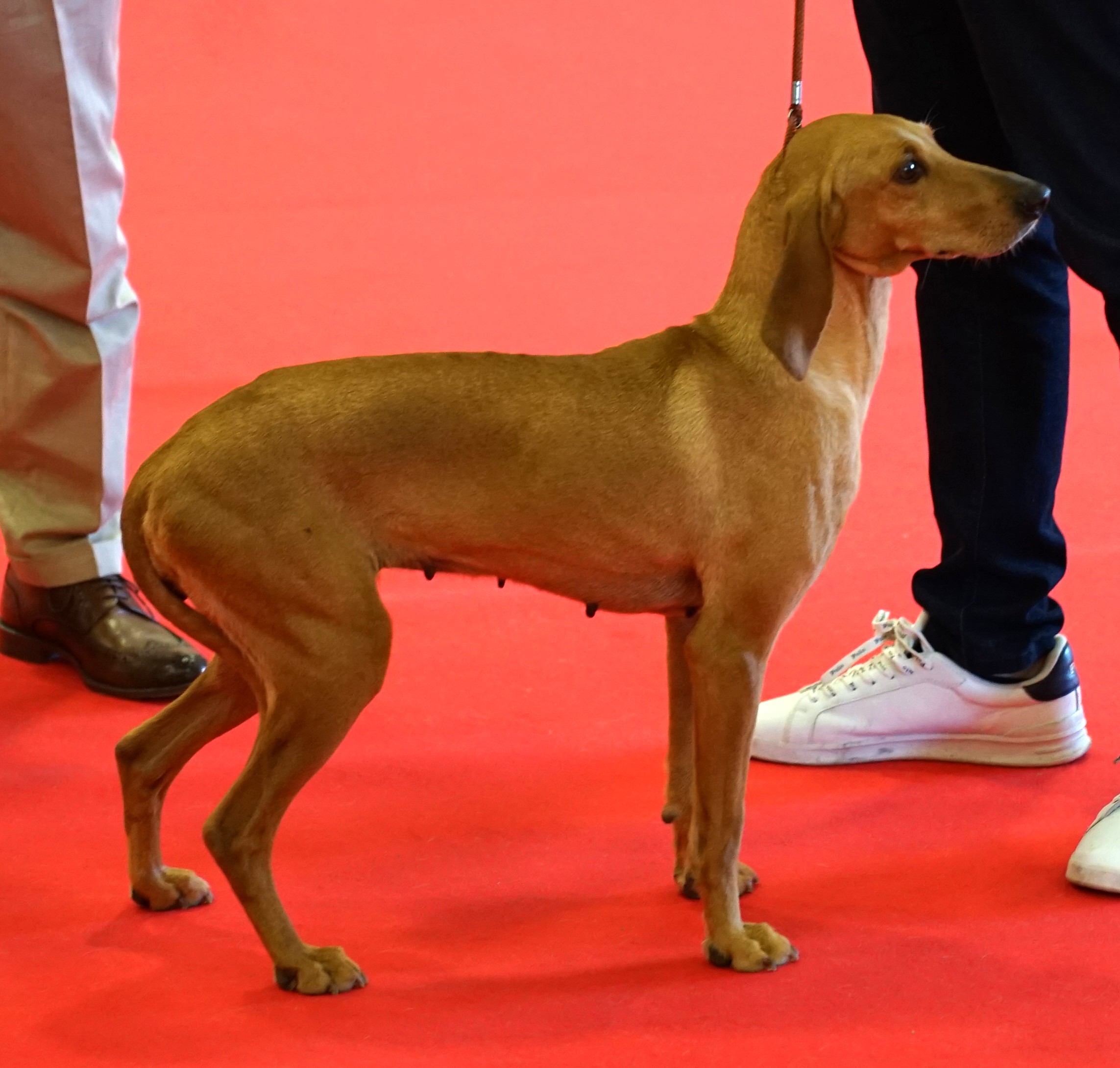
- smooth-haired

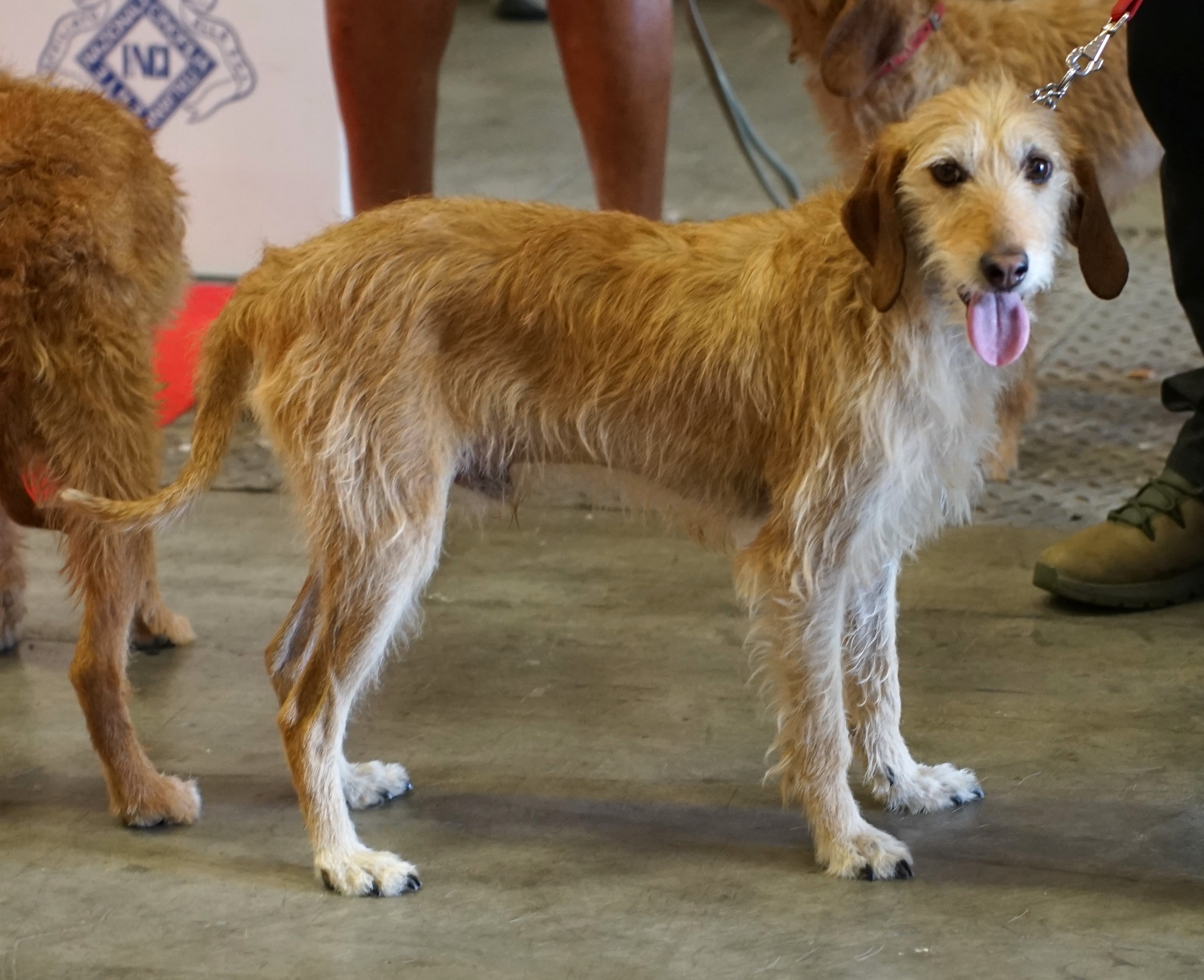
- rough-haired
- Other names: Appennine Hound; Italian Hare-hunting Dog
- Origin: Italy
Traits
Height	Males	44–50 cm
	Females	42–48 cm
- Weight: 10–18 kg
Kennel club standards
- Ente Nazionale della Cinofilia Italiana: standard
- Fédération Cynologique Internationale: standard

The Segugio dell'Appennino is an Italian breed of small scent hound, bred specifically to hunt hare. It may be either smooth-haired or wire-haired. It is one of four Italian breeds of scent hound, the others being the Segugio Italiano a Pelo Forte, the Segugio Italiano a Pelo Raso and the Segugio Maremmano. It received full recognition from the Ente Nazionale della Cinofilia Italiana in 2010, and was provisionally accepted by the Fédération Cynologique Internationale in 2026.

== History ==
The Segugio dell'Appennino was described as a breed or type distinct from other Italian dogs of segugio type in 1882, in an article in the magazine La Caccia Illustrata. A breed standard was drawn up by the Ente Nazionale della Cinofilia Italiana in 2005, and the breed received full recognition in 2010. From 2013 to 2022 the number of annual registrations varied from 205 to 414.

In 2015 an analysis of microsatellite data found no significant genetic distance between the Segugio dell'Appennino and the Segugio Maremmano.

In 2026 it was provisionally accepted by the Fédération Cynologique Internationale.

== Characteristics ==
While it is the smallest of the four Italian breeds of segugio or scent hound, it is of medium size: height at the withers is in the range 42 to 48 cm for bitches and 44 to 50 cm for dogs, with a tolerance of 2 cm above or below these limits for exceptionally good examples. The coat may be smooth – no longer than 2 cm, evenly and thickly distributed over the whole body; or it may be rough – hair from 2–5 cm in length, with dense undercoat, rough to the touch and covering the whole body but shorter on the head and insides of the legs. Four coat colours are recognised: black with tan markings; fawn in any shade; hare grey; and sooty (pale hair with black tips); white markings are acceptable on the lower limbs, on the tip of the tail, on the chest or neck, or on the muzzle or forehead.

== Use ==
It is a scent hound, bred specifically for use in hunting hare, but also used on wild boar. It hunts well either singly or in pairs, and can also form part of a small pack. It is particularly well suited to hunting in mountain terrain. It is subject to working trial.
