= Italian Greyhound =

Italian breed of sighthound

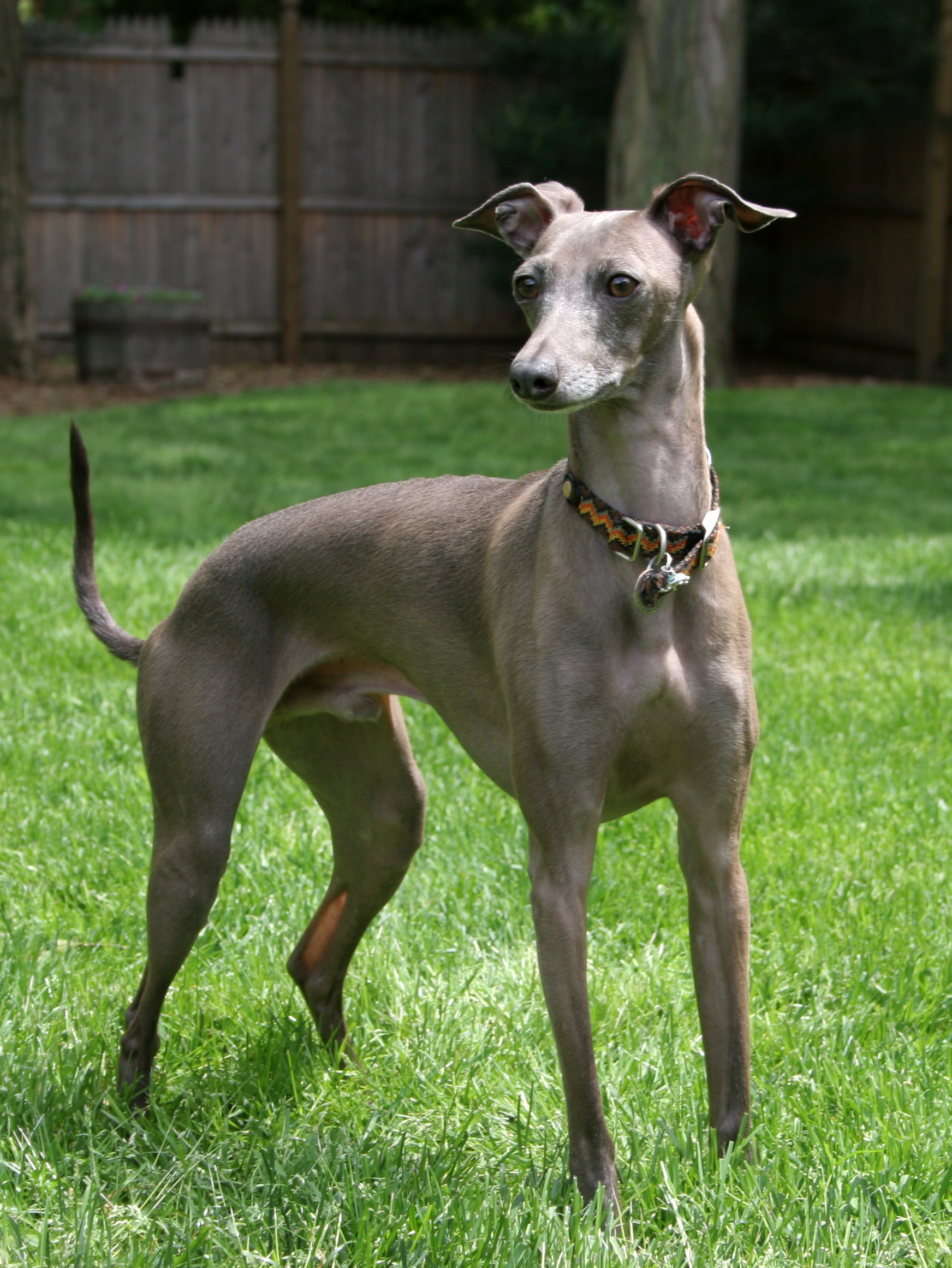

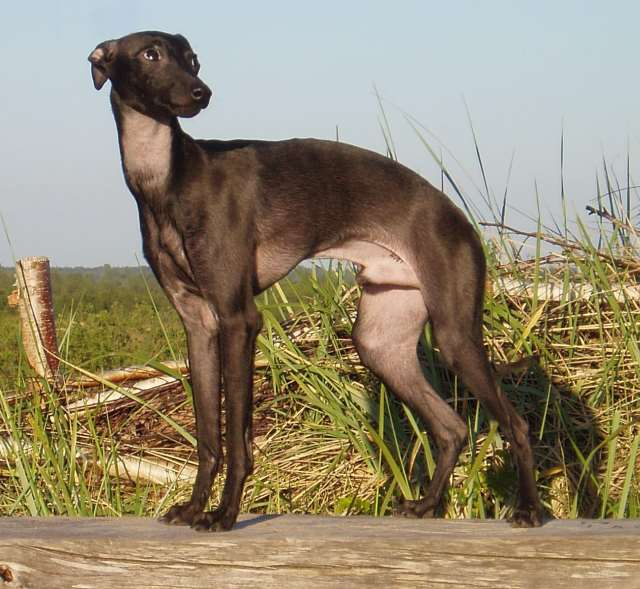
- Other names: Italian Sighthound; Piccolo Levriero Italiano
- Origin: Italy
Traits
- Height: 32 to 38 cm (13 to 15 in)
- Weight: not over 5 kg (11 lb)
- Colour: solid black, grey or isabelline
Kennel club standards
- Ente Nazionale della Cinofilia Italiana: standard
- Fédération Cynologique Internationale: standard

The Italian Greyhound or Piccolo Levriero Italiano is an Italian breed of small sighthound. It was bred to hunt hare and rabbit, but is kept mostly as a companion dog. The English-language name used for it by the Fédération Cynologique Internationale is Italian Sighthound.

== History ==
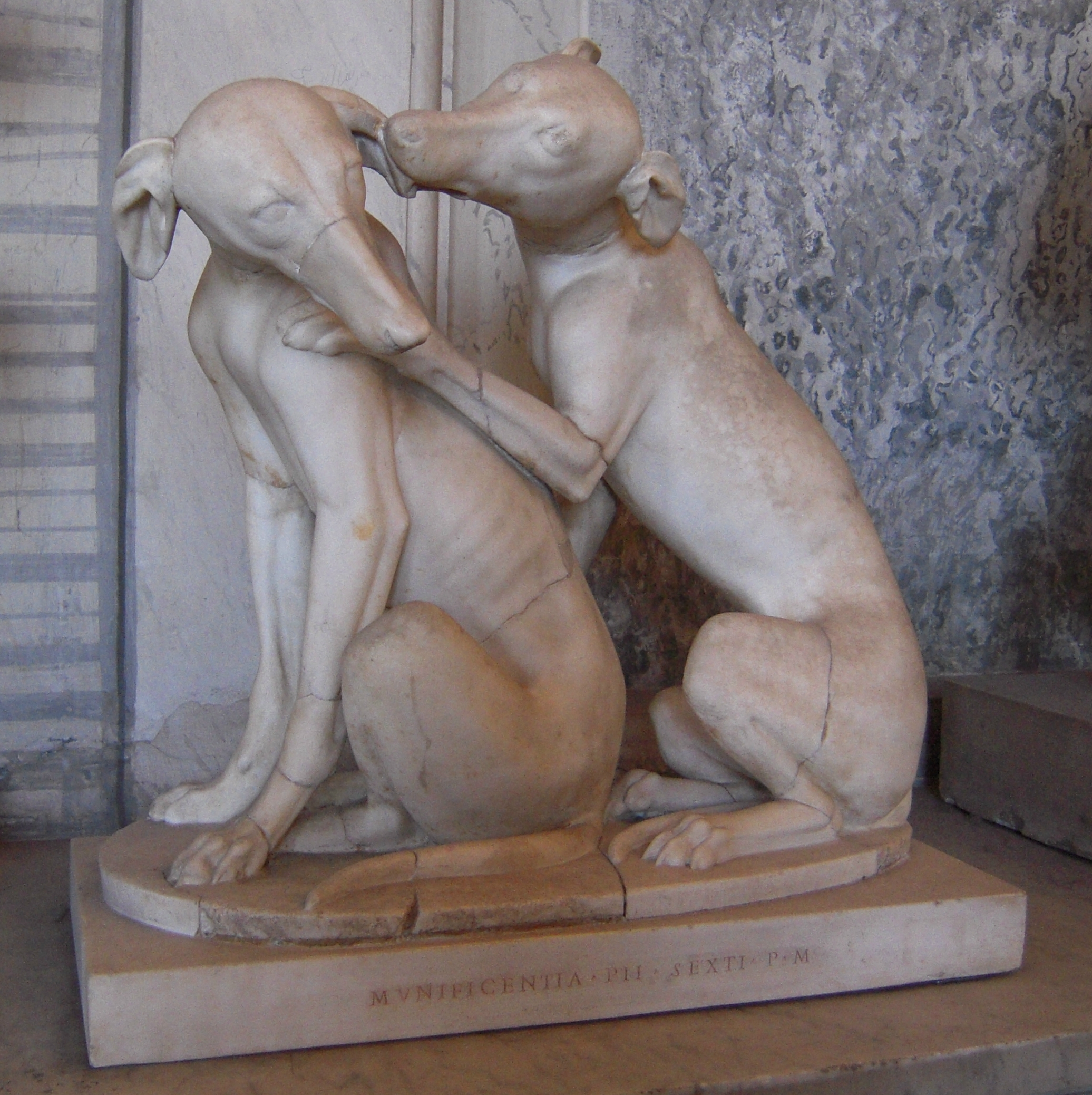
Marble statue believed to represent two sighthounds, perhaps Italian Greyhounds or their precursors, from the second century AD. Discovered at Lanuvium in 1774, now in the Vatican Museums

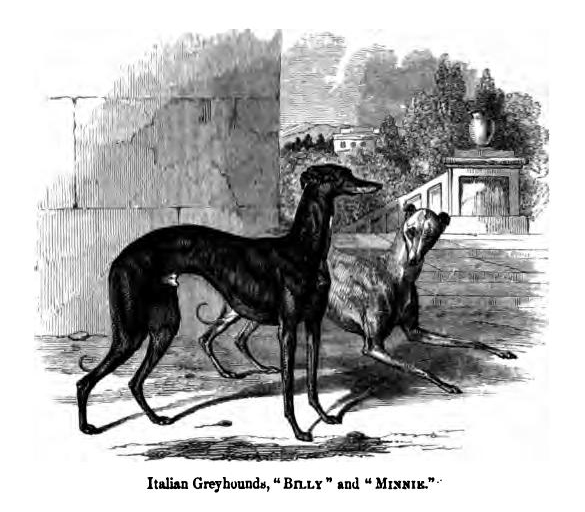
Engraving showing two prize-winning Italian Greyhounds in the United Kingdom, from John Henry Walsh, The Dog in Health and Disease, 1859

Small dogs of sighthound type have long been popular with European nobility and royalty. Among those believed to have kept them are Frederick II, Duke of Swabia; members of the D'Este, Medici and Visconti families; the French kings Louis XI, Charles VIII, Charles IX, Louis XIII and Louis XIV; Frederick the Great of Prussia; Anne of Denmark; Catherine the Great; and Queen Victoria. Dogs of this type have often been represented in sculpture – including a second-century Roman statue now in the Vatican Museums – and paintings, notably by Giotto, Sassetta and Tiepolo.

Dogs of this kind were taken in the first half of the nineteenth century to the United Kingdom, where they were known as Italian Greyhounds; the first volume of The Kennel Club Calendar and Stud Book, published in 1874, lists forty of them. A breed association, the Italian Greyhound Club, was established in Britain in 1900. Registrations by the American Kennel Club began in 1886.

The history of the modern Piccolo Levriero goes back to the last years of the nineteenth century. A total of six of the dogs were shown in 1901 in Milan and Novara, two in Turin in 1902, and one in Udine in 1903. Numbers began to increase only after the First World War, partly as a result of the work of two individual breeders, Emilio Cavallini and Giulia Ajò Montecuccoli degli Erri. In this post-War period the Piccolo Levriero was bred principally in Italy, France and Germany, and some Italian breeders imported dogs from outside the country. Of the forty-five of the dogs registered in 1926–1927 by the Kennel Club Italiano (as it was then known), twenty-eight were born in Italy and seventeen were imported.

The events of the Second World War brought the Piccolo Levriero close to extinction, and numbers began to recover only in the 1950s, particularly after 1951, when Maria Luisa Incontri Lotteringhi della Stufa brought the influential bitch Komtesse von Gastuna from Austria. The breed was definitively accepted by the Fédération Cynologique Internationale in October 1956, and in November of that year a breed society, the Circolo del Levriero Italiano, was formed under the auspices of the Ente Nazionale della Cinofilia Italiana; it was later renamed the Circolo del Piccolo Levriero Italiano.

In the nine years from 2011 to 2019, the Ente Nazionale della Cinofilia Italiana recorded a total of 2557 new registrations of the Piccolo Levriero, with a minimum of 213 and a maximum of 333 per year.

== Characteristics ==
The Italian Greyhound is the smallest of the sighthounds. It weighs no more than 5 kg and stands 32 to 38 cm at the withers. It is deep in the chest, with a tucked-up abdomen, long slender legs and a long neck. The head is small, elongated and narrow. The gait should be high-stepping and well-sprung, with good forward extension in the trot, and a fast gallop. The coat may be solid black, or grey or isabelline in any shade; white markings are accepted on the chest and feet only.

Median longevity is about 14 years, compared to an average of 12.5 for all dogs.

The dogs may be affected by breed-related neurological abnormalities including congenital deafness and cervical intervertebral disc disease. In the United States, the Ortheopedic Foundation for Animals has found the Italian Greyhound to be the least affected by hip dysplasia of 157 breeds studied, with an incidence of 0.

== Use ==
The original function of the Piccolo Levriero was to hunt hare and rabbit; it is capable of bursts of speed up to 60 km/h (35 mph). Although assigned to the sighthound or hare-coursing groups by the Fédération Cynologique Internationale and the Ente Nazionale della Cinofilia Italiana, the Italian Sighthound is – as it was in the past – kept mostly as a companion dog. It is classified as a toy breed by the American Kennel Club and the Kennel Club of the United Kingdom.
