= Segugio Maremmano =

Italian breed of hunting dog

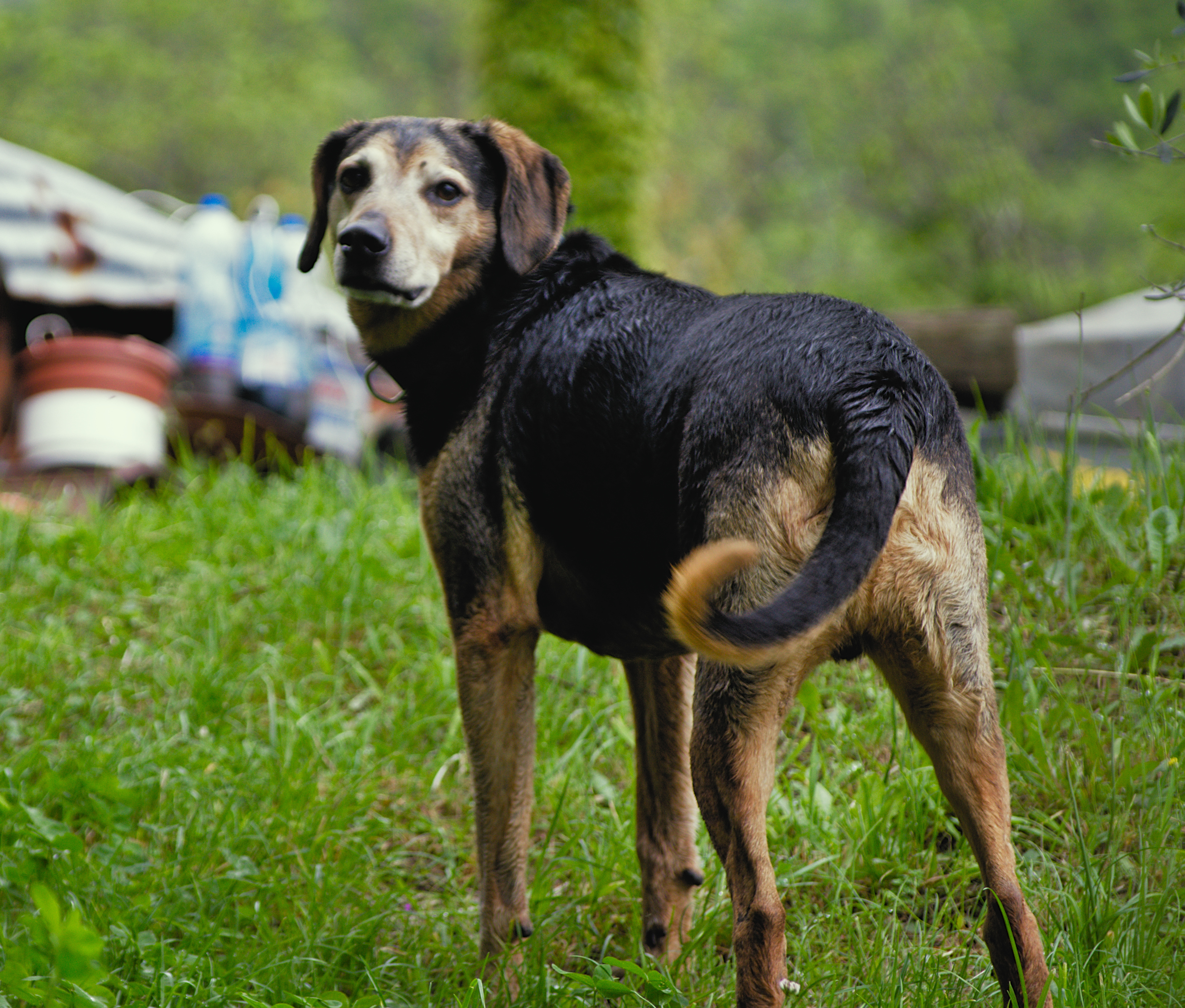

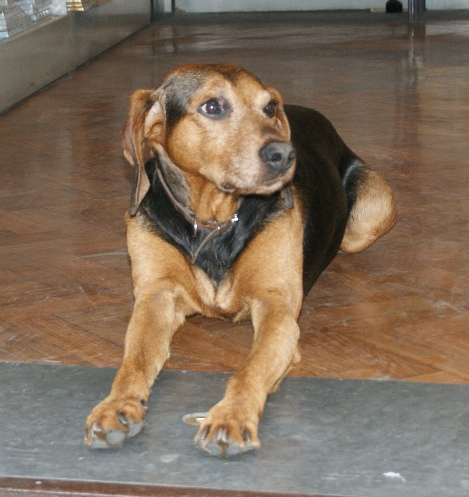
- Origin: Italy
Traits
Height	Males	48 to 54 cm (19 to 21 in)
	Females	46 to 52 cm (18 to 20 in)
Weight	Males	16 to 23 kg (35 to 50 lb)
	Females	13 to 20 kg (30 to 45 lb)
- Coat: smooth or rough
- Colour: fawn, from pale to dark tan; black and tan; brindle
Kennel club standards
- Ente Nazionale della Cinofilia Italiana: standard
- Fédération Cynologique Internationale: standard

The Segugio Maremmano is an Italian breed of scent hound from the coastal plains of the Maremma, in Tuscany. It is mainly used for hunting wild boar, but may also be used to hunt hare and other mammals. It may be either smooth-haired or rough-haired.

== History ==
The breed was recognized by the Ente Nazionale della Cinofilia Italiana in 2009. More than 6600 dogs were registered in that year, the highest number of registrations for any Italian breed. In 2018 there were 5679 new registrations, of which over 90% were of smooth-haired dogs.

It was provisionally accepted by the Fédération Cynologique Internationale in 2018.

In 2015 an analysis of microsatellite data found no significant genetic distance between the Segugio dell'Appennino and the Segugio Maremmano.

== Characteristics ==
Dogs stand between 48 and 54 cm at the withers, and weigh between 16 and 23 kg; bitches are about 2 cm shorter, and weigh approximately 3 kg less. The coat may be either smooth or rough; in colour it may be fawn, varying from pale fawn to a dark tan; black and tan; or brindle.

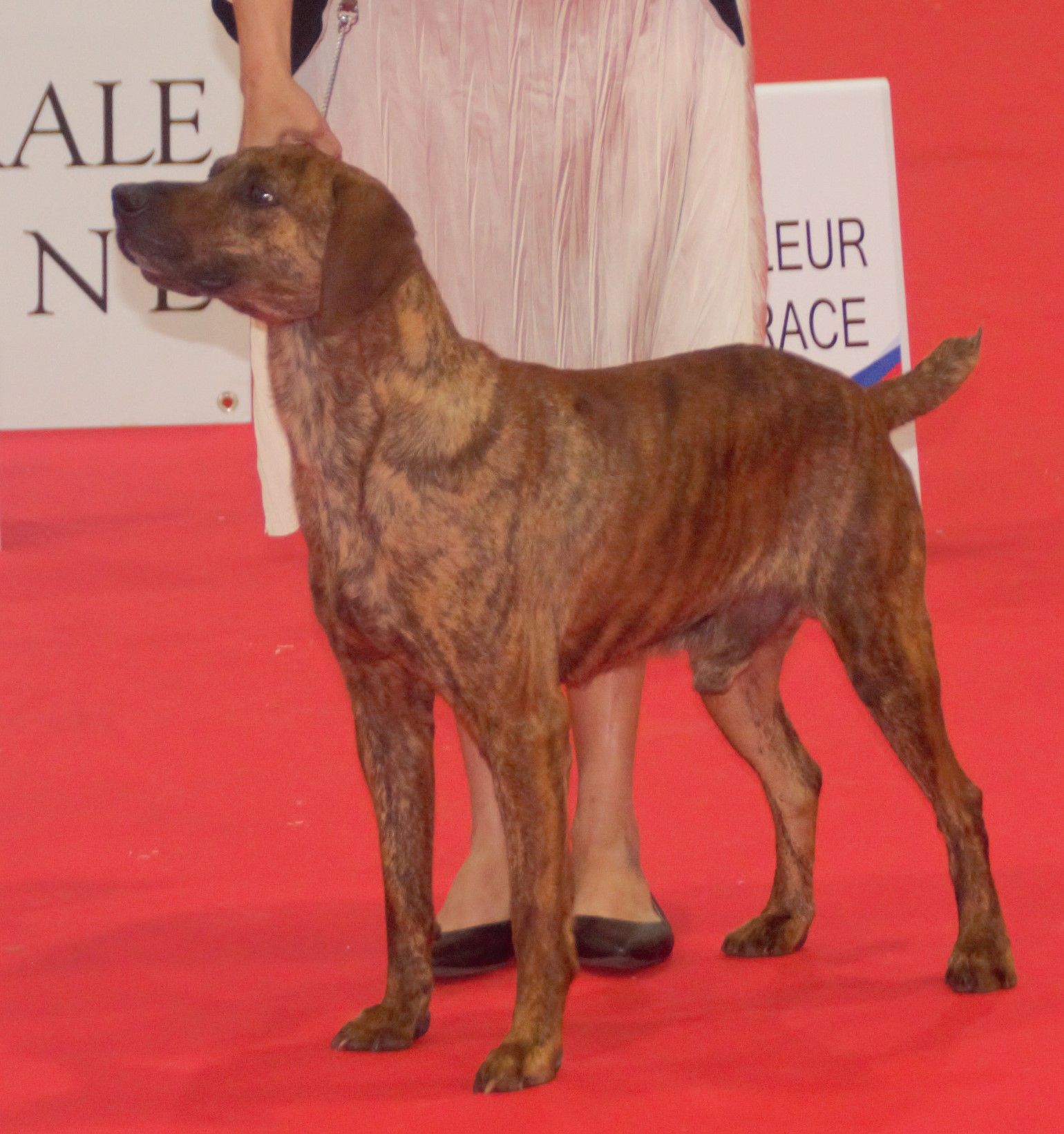
Smooth-haired

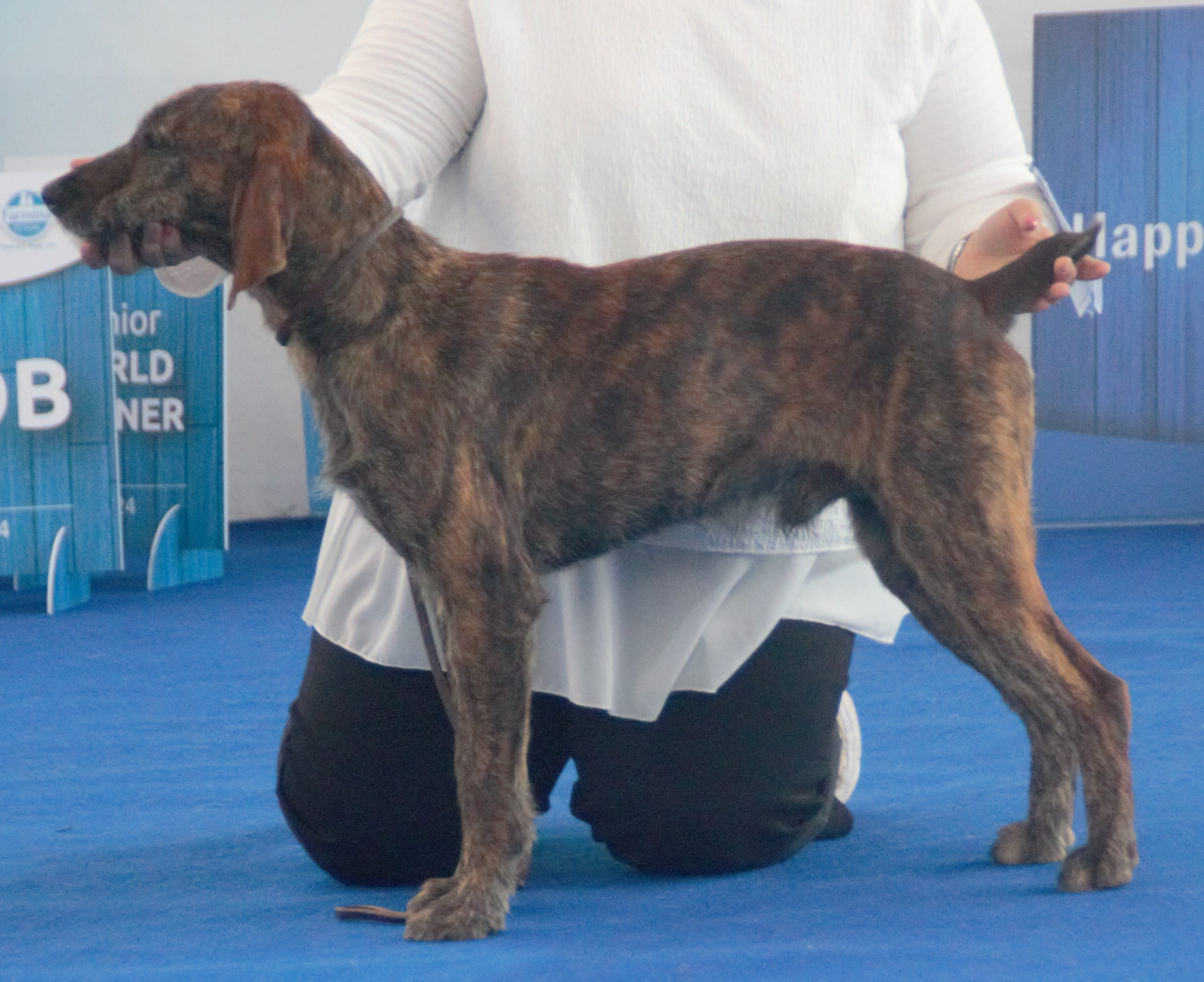
Rough-haired
