= Weimaraner =

German breed of dog

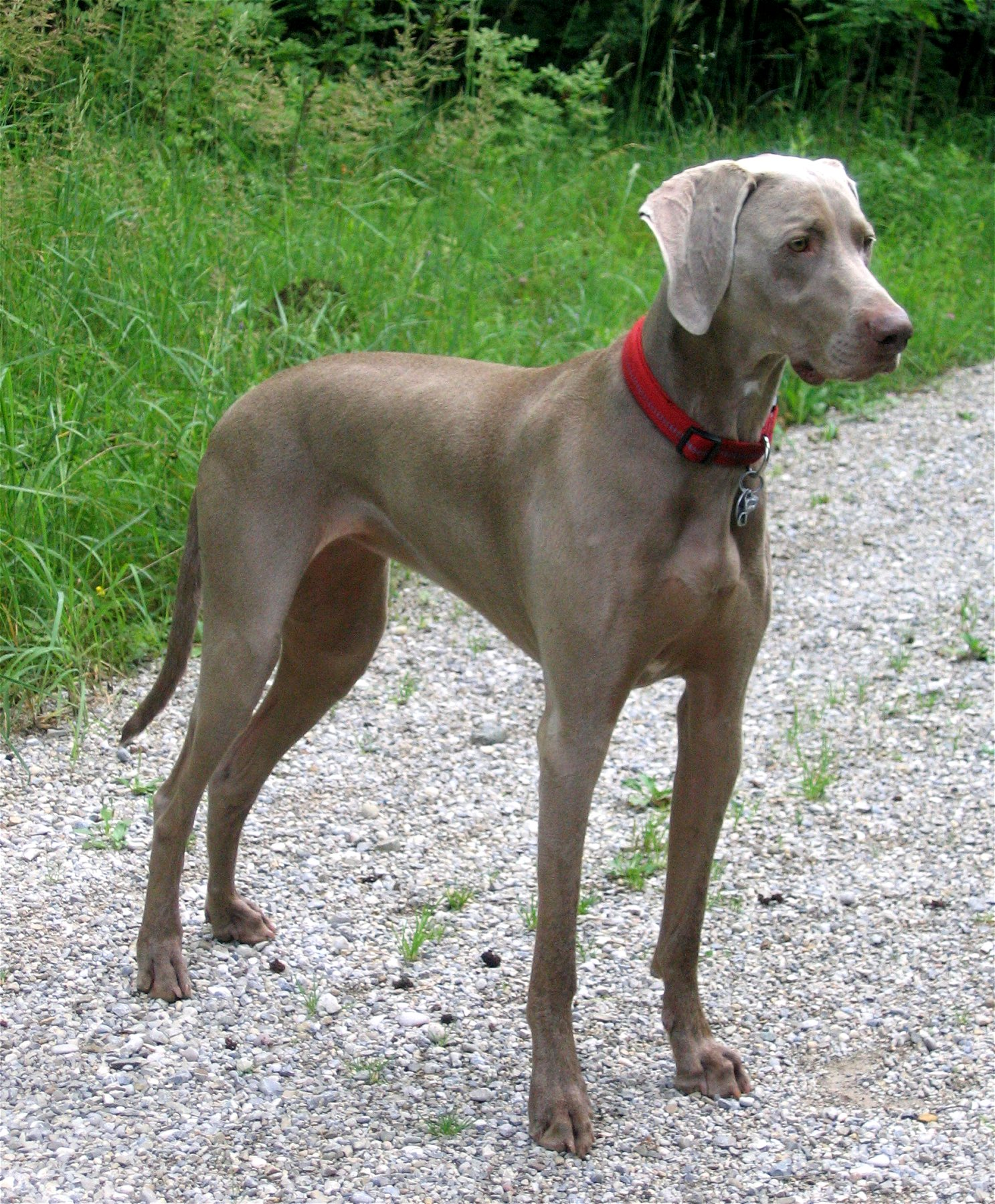
- Short-haired bitch, two years old
- Origin: Holy Roman Empire
Traits
Height	Males	59–70 cm (23–28 in)
	Females	57–65 cm (22–26 in)
Weight	Males	30–40 kg (66–88 lb)
	Females	25–35 kg (55–77 lb)
Kennel club standards
- Verband für das Deutsche Hundewesen: standard
- Fédération Cynologique Internationale: standard

The Weimaraner (Note: /ˈvaɪmərɑːnər/ VY-mər-ah-nər) is a German breed of hunting dog of medium to large size, with history going back at least to the nineteenth century.

It originated in the area of the city of Weimar (then in Saxe-Weimar-Eisenach, now in the state of Thuringia), for which it is named. It was recognised as a breed in 1891. It is an all-purpose gun dog, characterised by its speed and stamina, its good nose and eye, and its courage and intelligence; in Germany it is not considered suitable for keeping as a companion dog.

== History ==
Many theories of the origin of the Weimaraner have been advanced, but there are few documented historical facts; silver-grey dogs are shown in paintings by Antoon van Dyck in the seventeenth century and by Jean-Baptiste Oudry in the eighteenth. The breed is believed to have originated in the area of the city of Weimar (then in Saxe-Weimar-Eisenach, now in the state of Thuringia) – the city from which its name derives. It is sometimes claimed that the dogs were kept at the court of Karl August, Grand Duke of Saxe-Weimar-Eisenach, in the early nineteenth century.

From 1879 the dogs were considered to be a blue variant of the German Short-haired Pointer, and were eligible for registration in the stud-book of the Kurzhaar Klub. They first appeared at a dog show in 1880, when fourteen examples were presented in Berlin. These were of three differing types, from three different kennels: the traditional Thüringer Hund; the Weißenfelser Hund, which was rather more elegant; and the Sanderslebener, which was intermediate between the two. The Weimaraner was recognised as a distinct breed in 1891. A breed standard was drawn up in 1896, and in 1897 a breed association was established in Erfurt with the name Verein zur Reinzucht des silbergrauen Weimaraner-Vorstehhund; (Note: 'Association for the pure breeding of the silver-grey Weimaraner Pointer') this was soon changed to Verein zur Züchtung des Weimaraner Vorstehhundes. (Note: 'Association for breeding the Weimaraner Pointer')

In the early years of the twentieth century – the time of the Great War – the Weimaraner came close to extinction; it was reconstituted from the few surviving examples of the breed.

It was definitively accepted by the Fédération Cynologique Internationale in 1954.

In the fifteen years from 2007 to 2021, the annual number of new registrations in Germany averaged about 485, with a low of 390 and a high of 607.

== Characteristics ==
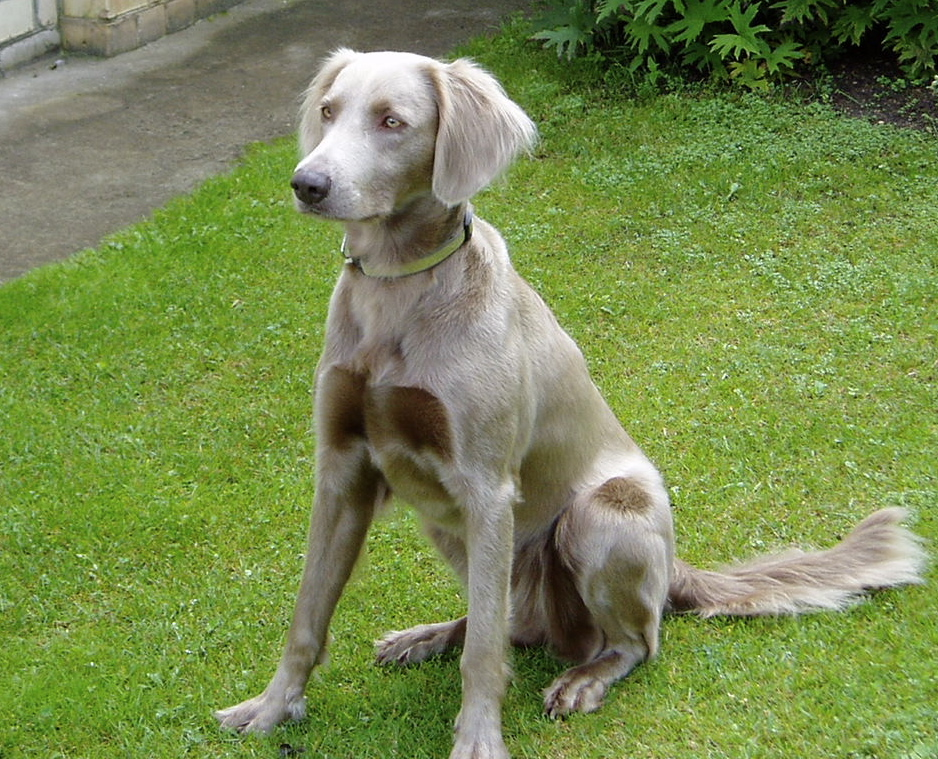
Long-haired bitch

The Weimaraner is of medium to large size: dogs stand some 59 to 70 cm at the withers, bitches about 57 to 65 cm; weights are in the range 30–40 kg for dogs, 25–35 kg for bitches.

The coat may be either short or long; a double coat of intermediate length is sometimes seen. The coat may be mouse-grey, roe-grey or silver-grey in various shades, or of a colour intermediate between these; minor white markings to the feet and chest are tolerated. The eyes are amber, ranging from pale to dark; the ears are pendent, with rounded tips.

Among the neurological diseases associated with the Weimaraner are cerebellar hypoplasia, hypomyelinogenesis and spinal dysraphism. Other diseases or defects to which it has some genetic or statistical predisposition include corneal dystrophy, distichiasis, entropion, eversion of the cartilage of the nictitating membrane, generalised demodicosis, medial canthal pocket syndrome, refractory corneal ulceration and XX sex reversal, and also – in dogs only – Weimaraner neutrophil dysfunction, pododermatitis and tricuspid dysplasia.

A 2024 UK study found a median lifespan of 12.8 years for the breed compared to an average of 12.7 for purebreeds and 12 for crossbreeds.

== Use ==
The Weimaraner is a versatile hunting dog, and may be used to track, point to, flush or retrieve birds or other game. Registration is subject to successful completion of a working trial. In Germany it is not considered to be suitable for keeping as a companion dog. According to the breed club, it "... basically belongs in the hands of hunters due to its development and its characteristics ... It is not a companion dog, but a hunting dog through and through. As such, it needs work in practical hunting in order to preserve its balanced nature"; (Note: "Es ist einleuchtend, dass der Weimaraner auf Grund seiner Entwicklung und seiner Eigenschaften grundsätzlich in Jägerhände gehört. ... Er ist kein Begleithund, sondern ein Jagdhund durch und durch. Als solcher benötigt er Arbeit im praktischen Jagdbetrieb, um sein ausgeglichenes Wesen zu bewahren") whelps are placed mainly with hunters.
