= Spanish pointer =

Spanish Pointer may refer to three Spanish bird dogs:

- Burgos Pointer, a modern Spanish dog breed from Castile, Spain known in English as the Spanish Pointer
- Pachón navarro, a "double-nose" Spanish dog breed from Navarre
- Old Spanish Pointer, an extinct dog breed and predecessor of the English Pointer dog
