= Gun dog =

Hunting dog type

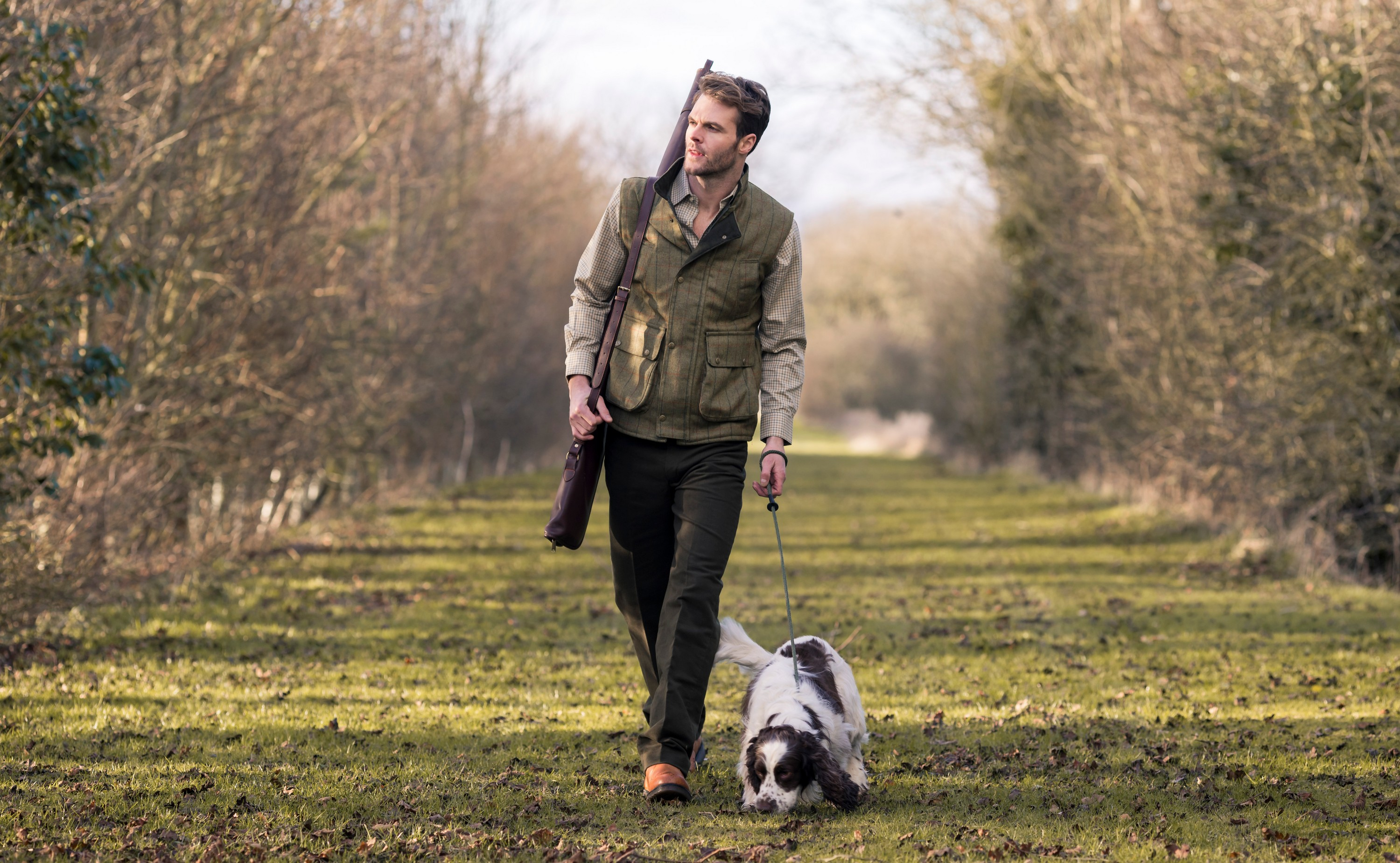
Man walking a spaniel gun dog (East Riding of Yorkshire, 2018)

Gun dogs (gundogs) or bird dogs are types of hunting dogs developed to assist hunters in finding and retrieving game, typically various fowls that are shot down on the wing (in flight). The term hunting dog is broad and includes all breeds and skills of hunting canines, but "gun dogs" refers to canines that are trained to work alongside a loud firearm while hunting or retrieving game.

Gun dogs are categorized by their usage. Due to the range of capabilities of different breeds of gun dogs, different breeds may fall under the definitions of multiple categories. The United Kennel Club divides gun dogs into four non-exclusive categories: retrievers, pointers, setters, and flushing spaniels.

While The United Kennel Club describes the fourth category of gun dogs to be flushing spaniels, there are other non-spaniel types of dogs which can be used for flushing.

== Types ==
There are several breeds used as gundogs with varying instinctive skill sets for each one.

Main category	Type	Example
Retrievers		Golden Retriever
Pointing	Pointers	English Pointer
Pointing	Setters	English Setter
Flushing dog	Spaniels	English Cocker Spaniel
Flushing dog	Water dogs	Standard Poodle

== List of gundog breeds ==
- Barbet
- Bracco Italiano
- Braque du Bourbonnais
- Brittany
- Burgos Pointer
- Drentsche Patrijshond
- Cesky Fousek
- Corded Poodle
- German Longhaired Pointer
- German Shorthaired Pointer
- German Spaniel
- German Wirehaired Pointer
- Hungarian Wirehaired Vizsla
- Kooikerhondje
- Lagotto Romagnolo
- Large Münsterländer
- Pointer
- Portuguese Water Dog
- Portuguese Pointer
- Pudelpointer
- Chesapeake Bay Retriever
- Curly Coated Retriever
- Flat-Coated Retriever
- Golden Retriever
- Labrador Retriever
- Nova Scotia Duck Tolling Retriever
- English Setter
- Gordon Setter
- Irish Setter
- Irish Red and White Setter
- Small Münsterländer
- American Cocker Spaniel
- American Water Spaniel
- Boykin Spaniel
- Clumber Spaniel
- English Cocker Spaniel
- English Springer Spaniel
- Field Spaniel
- Irish Water Spaniel
- Sussex Spaniel
- Welsh Springer Spaniel
- Spanish Water Dog
- Spinone Italiano
- Stichelhaar
- Standard Poodle
- Vizsla
- Weimaraner
- Wirehaired Pointing Griffon
- Wirehaired Vizsla

== History ==
In the seventeenth century, the French practice of shooting birds in flight was brought to England and Wales by King Charles II. Various spaniels and setters were used as gun dogs for this activity until the pointer was introduced from Spain in the early eighteenth century. In time, more breeds would be used as gun dogs, each with their own characteristics, and the term “gundog" would be coined by the late eighteenth century. The adoption of the breech-loading shotgun in the nineteenth century improved efficiency in hunting and the demand for well trained gun dogs increased. This increased demand led to the organization of dog shows and kennel clubs.

== Kennel club classification ==
When competing in conformation shows most kennel clubs, including The Kennel Club, group pedigree gun dog breeds together in their own gun dog group, whilst some such as the American Kennel Club group them in a sporting group. The term "sporting" more accurately reflects historical hunting and fishing styles for which many pointers, setters, flushing spaniels, water dogs, retrievers and decoy dogs were developed to work in conjunction with nets, traps, hawks, sighthounds, arrows and bolts rather than firearms.

== See also ==
- Field trial
