= German Spaniel =

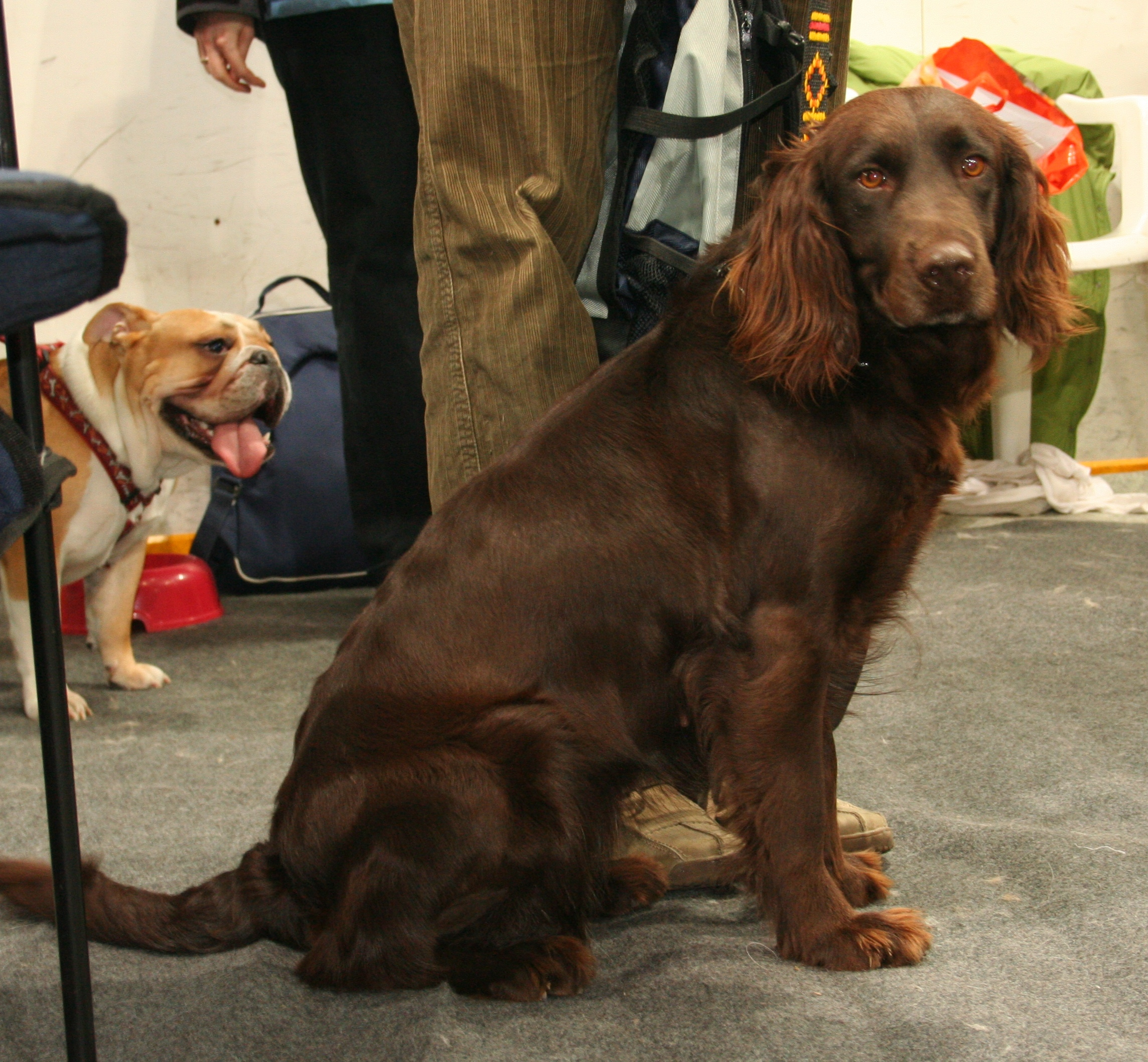
- German Spaniel
- Other names: Deutscher Wachtelhund; Deutscher Wachtel; German Quail Dog
- Origin: Germany
Traits
Height	Males	48–54 cm (19–21 in)
	Females	45–52 cm (18–20 in)
- Weight: 18–25 kg (40–55 lb)
- Coat: Mostly wavy
- Color: Solid Brown/red; Roan (brown and white or red and white).
Kennel club standards
- VDH: standard
- Fédération Cynologique Internationale: standard

The German Spaniel, also known as the Deutscher Wachtelhund (German Quail Dog), is a breed of dog that was developed in Germany around 1890, and is used as a hunting dog. Descended from the old German breed, the Stöberer (lit. "rummager"), which became popular with commoners following the Revolutions of 1848 in the German states, who required a versatile hunting dog. Stoeberer is now a type of hunting dog in Germany with the Wachtelhund being its sole member. The breed is not very well known outside of Germany, but was recognised by the United Kennel Club in 1996.

A well built breed, its coat comes in brown shades with occasional white markings. It can be trained to retrieve game, as well as for tracking. It is related to the Small Münsterländer (″Heidewachtel″) and the Drentse Patrijshond, all of which are descendants from the quail dog that at least date back to the 15th century.

== History ==
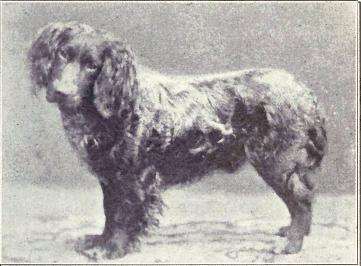
A German Spaniel photographed in 1915.

Frederick Roberth, a German dog breeder, is credited with creating the modern Deutscher Wachtelhund around 1890. While several breeds feature in its makeup, the most prominent dog breed to be bred into the modern breed is the now extinct Stoeberer. The Stoeberer has been mentioned in literature as far back as 1719, and was thought to have a nose as powerful as a Bloodhound. Following the Revolutions of 1848 in the German states, the common man in the German states was allowed to hunt and needed a versatile hunting dog; that dog was the Stoeberer. In the late 19th century, when Roberth was working on his new breed, he found specimens of the Stoeberer in Bavaria, and those dogs were crossed with water dogs and sporting spaniels to become the modern German Spaniel.

In 1903, the Deutscher Wachtelhund was recognised as a breed and, following that, the German breed club, the Verein für Deutsche Wachtelhund (VDW), was organised. The term Stoeberer has since become a category of hunting dog in Germany, with the Wachtelhund being the sole member of that category. In 1910, the VDW selected four male dogs and seven female dogs upon which to base the breed standard for the Wachtelhund. Those dogs were selected from all over Germany, one coming from each region, with two coming from Hannover. All of the modern registered German Spaniels today are descended from those eleven dogs.

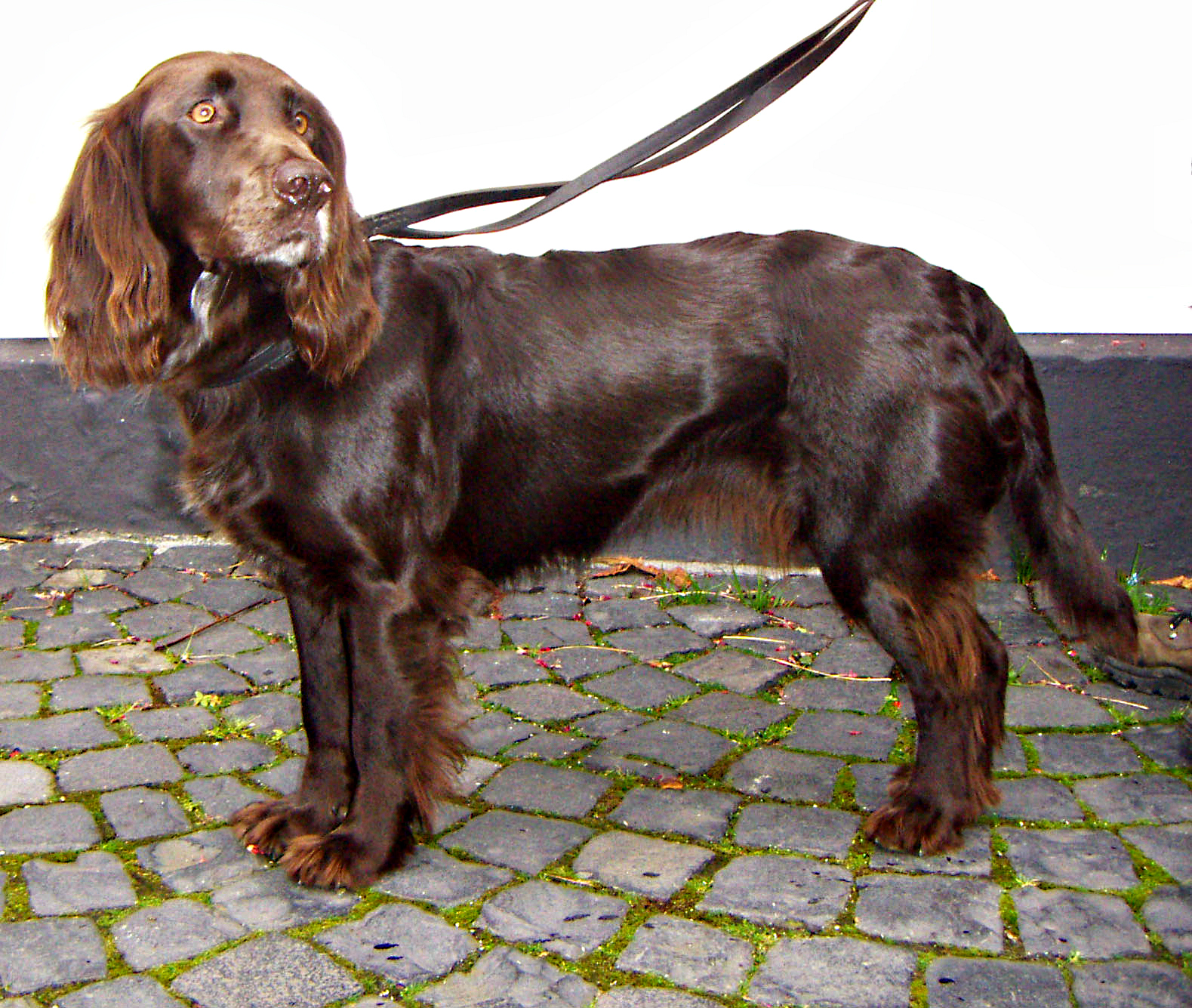
A modern German Spaniel

John Scott, 1st Earl of Eldon, Lord Chancellor of Great Britain owned a German Spaniel named Pincher, thought to be his favourite dog, which was painted by Edwin Henry Landseer. The dog originally belonged to his son William Henry, but became his constant companion. Lord Eldon would write of Pincher's behaviour in correspondence, for example to Lady F. J. Bankes in December 1831: "When I got to Southampton, Pincher, who sends his kindest regards, marched up to the bed-room, in which I slept the last two times I was there. The chambermaid provided another room for me, the house being full of company, there being a ball at Southampton. Pincher was uneasy at this, and out of humour, and if he could speak, he would not have allowed it." Following Lord Eldon' death, a sum was left to his daughter, Lady Frances, specifically to pay for the care of the dog.

Not usually kept as pets, the dogs are often owned by German foresters and professional hunters. In the 1960s and 70s, several German Spaniels were imported into the United States, and descendants of those dogs are now used in Canada to track down and flush out American black bear. A further pair of dogs was brought to the United States in 1994, and the United Kennel Club recognised the breed in 1996, placing it in the Gun dog group.

== Description ==
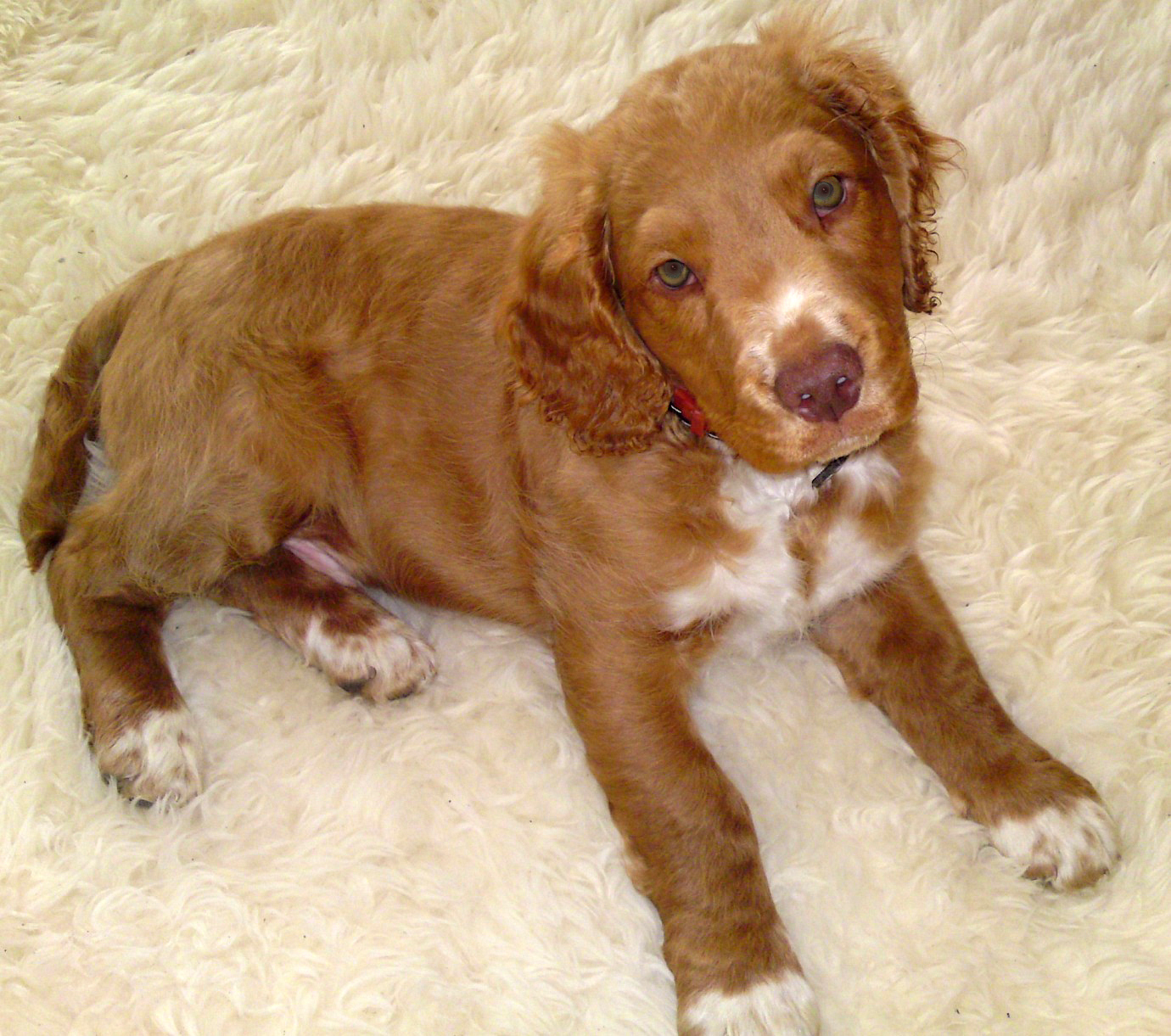
A three-month-old puppy, showing the variation in the shades of color in the breed

The Deutscher Wachtelhund is a strong boned, muscular, medium-sized gundog with long thick wavy hair. The ears are fairly long and should reach from halfway to the nose, to the tip of the nose. The size is approximately 48–54 centimetres (19–21 in) at the withers for dogs and 45–52 centimetres (18–20 in) for bitches. Average weight for both dogs and bitches is between 18 and 25 kilograms (40 and 55 lb).

The coat is short and fine on the head, and long on the body, where it is strong, thick, wavy or curly, with enough undercoat to provide protection. It has a well feathered coat which is usually either brown or brown roan. Although brown, it can have white markings chest and/or legs, and may have white ticking anywhere on its body. Other colors that the coat can come in include red and white, and solid red. Plain black coats do not occur in the breed.

== See also ==
- List of dog breeds
