= Hyccin protein family =

Hyccin family

Identifiers
- Symbol: Hyccin
- Pfam: PF09790
- InterPro: IPR018619
Available protein structures:
- PDB: IPR018619 PF09790 (ECOD; PDBsum)
- AlphaFold: IPR018619; PF09790

Hyccin

Identifiers
- Symbol: HYCC1
- Alt. symbols: FAM126A
- NCBI gene: 84668
- HGNC: 24587
- OMIM: 610531
- RefSeq: NM_032581
- UniProt: Q9BYI3

Other data
- Locus: Chr. 7 p15.3
Search for
- Structures: Swiss-model
- Domains: InterPro

Hyccin 2

Identifiers
- Symbol: HYCC2
- Alt. symbols: FAM126B
- NCBI gene: 285172
- HGNC: 28593
- RefSeq: NM_173822
- UniProt: Q8IXS8

Other data
- Locus: Chr. 2 q33.1
Search for
- Structures: Swiss-model
- Domains: InterPro

In molecular biology, the hyccin protein family is a family of proteins which may have a role in the beta-catenin-Tcf/Lef signaling pathway, as well as in the process of myelination of the central and peripheral nervous system.

The two members found in humans are called Hyccin and Hyccin 2, and are encoded by the genes HYCC1 and HYCC2 respectively. Defects in Hyccin are the cause of Hypomyelination and Congenital Cataract (HCC), also called leukodystrophy hypomyelinating type 5 (HLD5). This disorder is characterised by congenital cataracts, progressive neurologic impairment, and diffuse myelin deficiency. Affected individuals experience progressive pyramidal and cerebellar dysfunction, muscle weakness and wasting prevailing in the lower limbs.
