= Autosomal dominant leukodystrophy with autonomic disease =

- Other names: Autosomal dominant adult-onset demyelinating leukodystrophy, ADLD, Adult-onset autosomal dominant demyelinating leukodystrophy, Adult-onset autosomal dominant leukodystrophy, Leukodystrophy, demyelinating, adult-onset, autosomal dominant, Pelizaeus-Merzbacher disease, autosomal dominant or late-onset type, Multiple sclerosis-like disorder
- Specialty: Medical genetics
- Symptoms: Cognitive deficits, ataxia, and dysfunctions of the autonomic system
- Complications: Walking difficulties
- Usual onset: Adulthood
- Duration: Lifelong
- Causes: Genetic mutation
- Diagnostic method: Genetic testing
- Differential diagnosis: Multiple sclerosis
- Prevention: none
- Prognosis: Bad, but quality of life can be improved with treatment
- Frequency: rare, at least 70 people on Earth have been diagnosed with the condition
- Deaths: Inevitable in patients with this condition

Autosomal dominant leukodystrophy with autonomic disease is a rare neurological condition of genetic origin which is characterized by gradual demyelination of the central nervous system which results in various impairments, including ataxia, mild cognitive disability and autonomic dysfunction. It is part of a group of disorders called "leukodystrophies".

== Signs and symptoms ==
Unlike other leukodystrophy syndromes, whose typical age of onset is during childhood, individuals with this condition typically start showing symptoms between their early 40s and late 50s, once they appear, they slowly progress in severity and new symptoms start appearing.

These symptoms first start out with dysfunctions of the autonomic nervous system which result in symptoms such as abnormal functioning of both the bladder and bowel, recurrent blood pressure drops whenever patients stand up, and male erectile dysfunction.

Rarely, anhidrosis might also occur alongside these symptoms.

After these symptoms start, movement impairments develop; they start off at the legs but then progress and move to the arms and the face, these impairments include either muscular spasticity or weakness, intention tremors, ataxia, dysmetria, and dysdiadochokinesis.

In some individuals, progressive dementia is present.

== Complications ==
There are various complications associated with the symptoms that ADLD causes.

Due to the ataxia and its associated coordination impairments, people might have difficulties with movements such as walking by themselves.

== Treatment ==
Treatment is focused on the symptoms themselves

The ataxic movement impairments can be treated with walking support systems such as canes or wheelchairs, physical therapy, occupational therapy and speech therapy.

== Diagnosis ==
This condition is diagnosed mainly through MRIs and genetic testing of the LMNB gene and the areas surrounding it, although symptom examination is also important for the diagnosis. Clinical guidelines developed in partnership with the ADLD Center provide the most up to date recommendations regarding disease diagnosis.

== Causes ==
This condition is caused by a duplication of the LMNB1 gene, this gene takes part in the production of the lamin B1 protein, which is essential for determining the nucleus' shape within the cells, the replication of DNA, and the way certain genes express themselves.

When the gene is duplicated (as seen in patients with ADLD), there is an excess of lamin B1 protein, this leads to the underexpression of genes that are important for the production of myelin and an increased hardening of the nuclear envelope, which results in a progressive reduction of myelin production and maintenance as one ages.

Like the name of the condition implies, this condition is inherited following an autosomal dominant pattern, which means that only one copy of a certain mutation (in this case, the duplication of the LMNB1 gene) is needed for a trait or disorder to be expressed, in familial cases, offspring have a 1 in 2, or 50% chance of inheriting a copy of said mutation from one of their affected parents.

Although very rarely, this disorder can be caused by deletions near the LMNB1 gene, only one such family has been described in medical literature: they had a deletion upstream the same gene.

== Pathophysiology ==
In patients with the condition, demyelination (that is, a loss of myelin) starts occurring in both the brain and the spinal cord years before symptoms show up, this abnormality has been identified to be a contributing factor to the development of the first symptoms individuals with this condition show during the early stages of it. In 2025, the patient advocacy group, ADLD Center, kicked off a natural history study in partnership with the Mayo Clinican and Children's Hospital of Philadelphia to advance understanding of disease progressions and help shape future treatments.

== Phenotype-genotype ==
In a 2018 study done by Naomi Mezaki and 18 other colleagues, it was found that ADLD patients with a deletion near the LMNB1 gene (2 patients from a single family) started showing symptoms at an earlier age, had less autonomic dysfunctions and had more noticeable cognitive deficits than other ADLD patients with duplication of the LMNB1 gene (4 patients from 3 families).

== Prognosis ==
This condition is progressive and fatal.

While the quality of life might be improved with treatment, the life expectancy can't be improved easily: individuals diagnosed with ADLD typically live for another 10 to 20 years after their diagnosis before their death.

== Prevalence ==
At least 70 cases from 35 families around the world have been described in medical literature, most of these were from families of Caucasian descent.

== History ==
This condition was first discovered in 1964 by E Zerbin-Rüdin et al. when they described (what they thought to be) a familial autosomal dominant variant of Pelizaeus-Merzbacher disease with onset in adulthood.

In 2006, Padiath et al. found the LMNB1 duplication involved in ADLD in 4 families, of which 1 was previously described in medical literature. Haplotype studies revealed that the family mentioned beforehand and another Irish-American family shared a common ancestor. The lamin B1 protein was found to be overly expressed in brain tissues of family members affected with ADLD.

In 2019, the patient advocacy group, ADLD Center, was founded to accelerate research, improve care, and unite the ADLD community in a relentless pursuit of effective treatments for Autosomal Dominant Leukodystrophy.

== See also ==
- Hypomyelination-congenital cataract syndrome
- Leukodystrophy
- Demyelination
