= Braque du Bourbonnais =

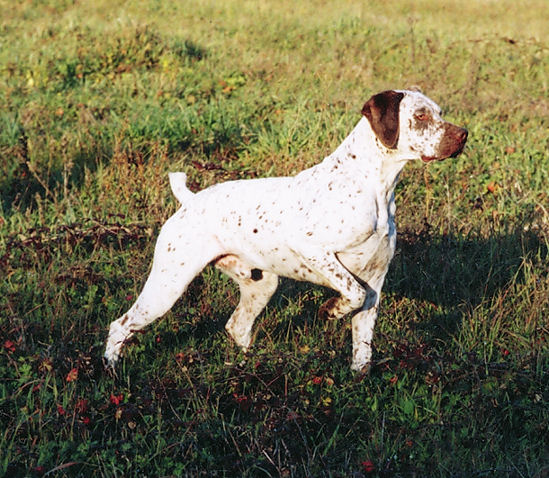
- A Braque du Bourbonnais pointing partridge
- Other names: Bourbonnais Pointer; Bourbonnais Pointing Dog
- Origin: France
Traits
Height	Males	51–57 cm (20–22 in)
	Females	48–55 cm (19–22 in)
- Coat: Short and fine. Coat is commonly longer and coarser on their back
- Color: White or brown, with fine brown, white, fawn, or sometimes black ticking.
- Litter size: 3-9
Kennel club standards
- Société Centrale Canine: standard
- Fédération Cynologique Internationale: standard

The Braque du Bourbonnais is a breed of gundog sometimes born with a short tail, with a coat ticked with liver, fawn, black, or white.

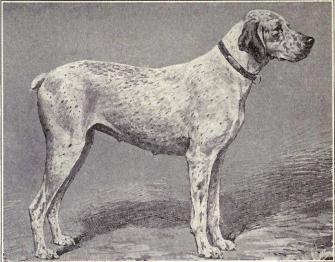
Pointer of Bourbonnais circa 1915

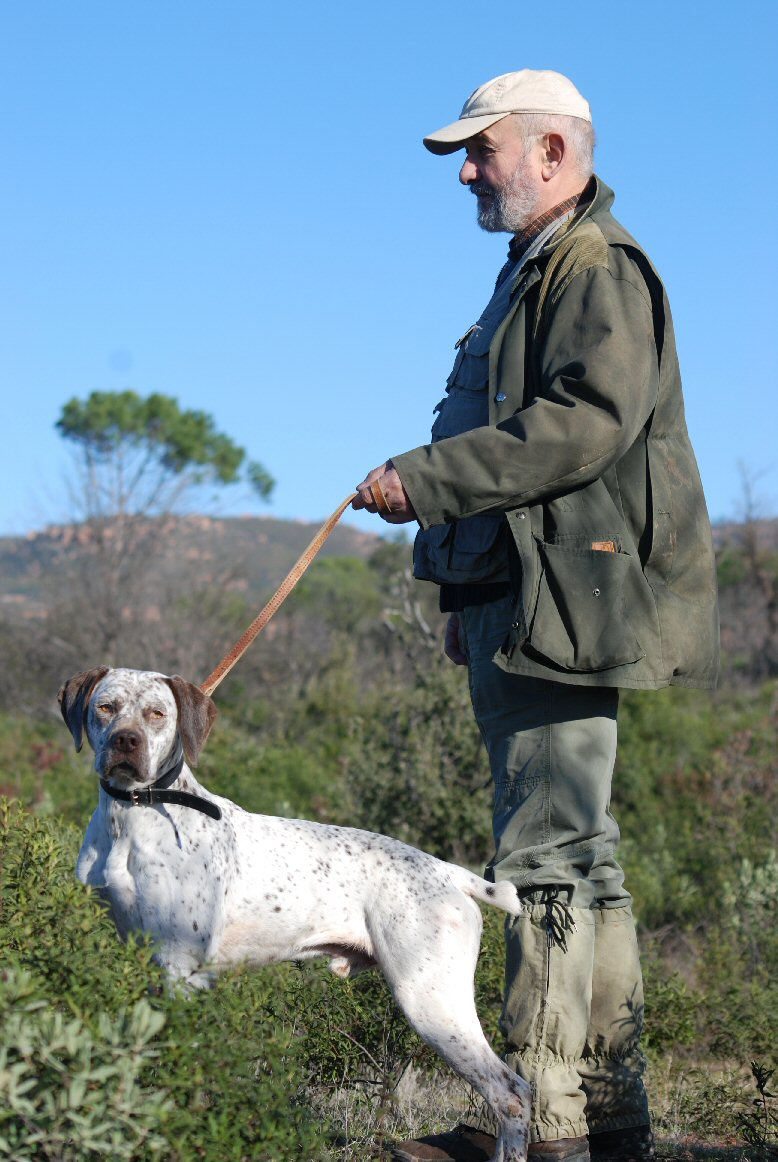
Michel Comte with his Braque du Bourbonnais

== Disappearance ==
After World War II, the number of births decreased and the club became less active until it ceased to function. From 1963 to 1973, there were no dogs registered in the LOF (French studbook). The reason for this is probably a selection on secondary characteristics (color of the coat, short tail) instead of the hunting capabilities and general construction of the dog; this led to have a Bourbonnais less suitable for hunting than other breeds.

== Recreation ==
In 1970, Michel Comte decided to look for the last dog that had some Bourbonnais blood. He found only mixed breed dogs, which had some characteristics of the Braque du Bourbonnais (size, shape of the head, short tail). After some more or less inbred litters, he registered his first Bourbonnais on the LOF (under Titre Initial procedure) in 1973, 1974, and 1975; from then, several breeders joined him, who, from those dogs, created their own lines, and the number of births increased.

In 1981, the Club du Braque du Bourbonnais was recreated. Michel Comte was its president until 2001. From this moment, the successes of the Bourbonnais in field trials made the breed thrive.

In 1988, the first Bourbonnais was introduced in the USA. Since then the breed has been growing in that country, which became the second producer of Bourbonnais pointers after France.

== Description ==
=== Appearance ===
==== Head ====
Rounded in every direction, with lateral sides rounded, with parietal bones and zygomatic arches well developed. The axes of the skull and muzzle are parallel, or slightly divergent towards the front. The head position is high or prolonging the shoulder.

==== Coat ====
Two coat colors exist in the Bourbonnais, each of them having specific name because the color is specific to the breed: Liver, also called "wine dregs" or "faded lilac", and Fawn, also called "peach blossom". Big spots are tolerated on the body if they are not bigger than the palm of a hand. On the head, the two eyes must not be inside the same spot.

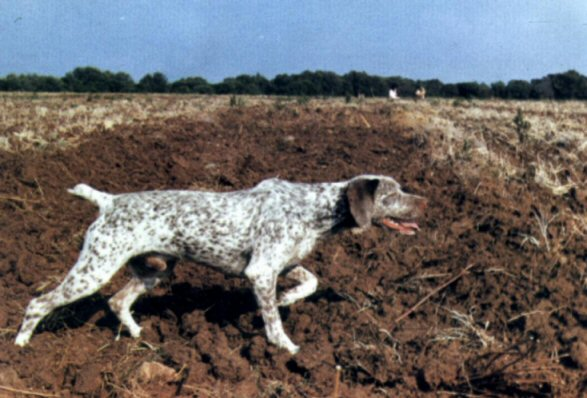
liver sire

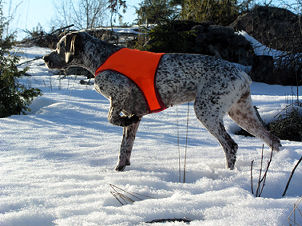
liver bitch

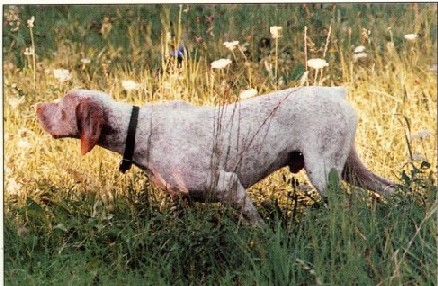
fawn sire

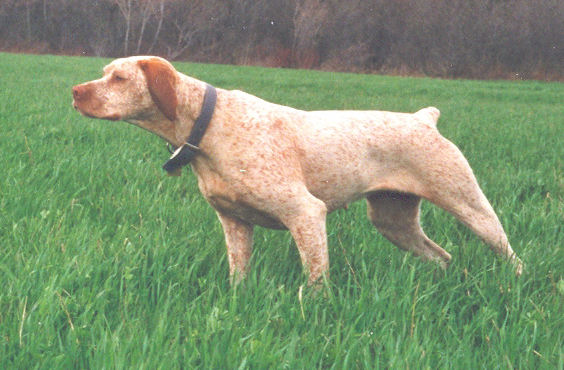
fawn bitch

==== Differences sire/Female ====
The females are generally thinner, more elegant and longer than the sires (see pictures above).

==== Short tail ====
In the past called "short-tail pointer", the braque du Bourbonnais is sometimes born with a short tail (brachyury) or no tail at all (anury). The gene responsible for this characteristic has been identified as being the same as the Brittany one, of autosomal dominant type.

=== Temperament ===
They have a good temper and can be a good agreement dog. They're very loyal to their family and love being by their owners side, but once they're out hunting they're very attentive and motivated. An even blend between an affectionate family dog and a hard working hunter.

They show a lot of activity, even if they do not go very far. Their natural pace is gallop, but under cover they can trot. They can change direction quickly, like polo.

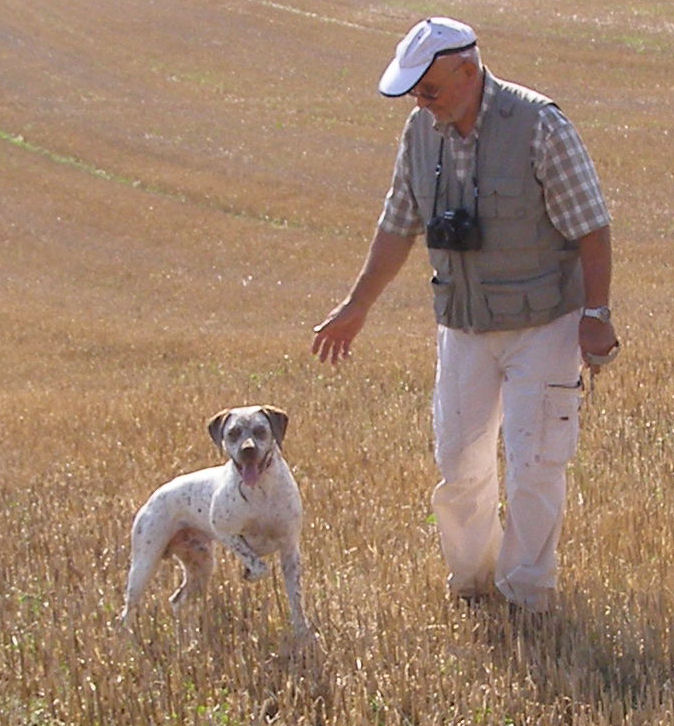
Michel Comte with a pointing Bourbonnais

=== Pointing ===
They must point with authority, in a classical position.

== See also ==
- List of dog breeds
