= Heart valve dysplasia =

- Specialty: Cardiology

Heart valve dysplasia is a congenital heart defect which affects the aortic, pulmonary, mitral, and tricuspid heart valves. Dysplasia of the mitral and tricuspid valves can cause leakage of blood or stenosis.

Dysplasia of the mitral and tricuspid valves - also known as the atrioventricular (AV) valves - can appear as thickened, shortened, or notched valves. The chordae tendinae can be fused or thickened. The papillary muscles can be enlarged or atrophied. The cause is unknown, but genetics play a large role. Dogs and cats with tricuspid valve dysplasia often also have an open foramen ovale, an atrial septal defect, or inflammation of the right atrial epicardium. In dogs, tricuspid valve dysplasia can be similar to Ebstein's anomaly in humans.

Mitral valve stenosis is one of the most common congenital heart defects in cats. In dogs, it is most commonly found in Great Danes, German Shepherd Dogs, Bull Terriers, Golden Retrievers, Newfoundlands, and Mastiffs. Tricuspid valve dysplasia is most common in the Old English Sheepdog, German Shepherd Dog, Weimaraner, Labrador Retriever, Great Pyrenees. It is inherited in the Labrador Retriever.

The disease and symptoms are similar to progression of acquired valve disease in older dogs. Valve leakage leads to heart enlargement, arrhythmias, and congestive heart failure. Heart valve dysplasia can be tolerated for years or progress to heart failure in the first year of life. Diagnosis is with an echocardiogram. The prognosis is poor with significant heart enlargement.
