= Limber tail syndrome =

Neurological disease in dogs with pain and paralysis in the tail area

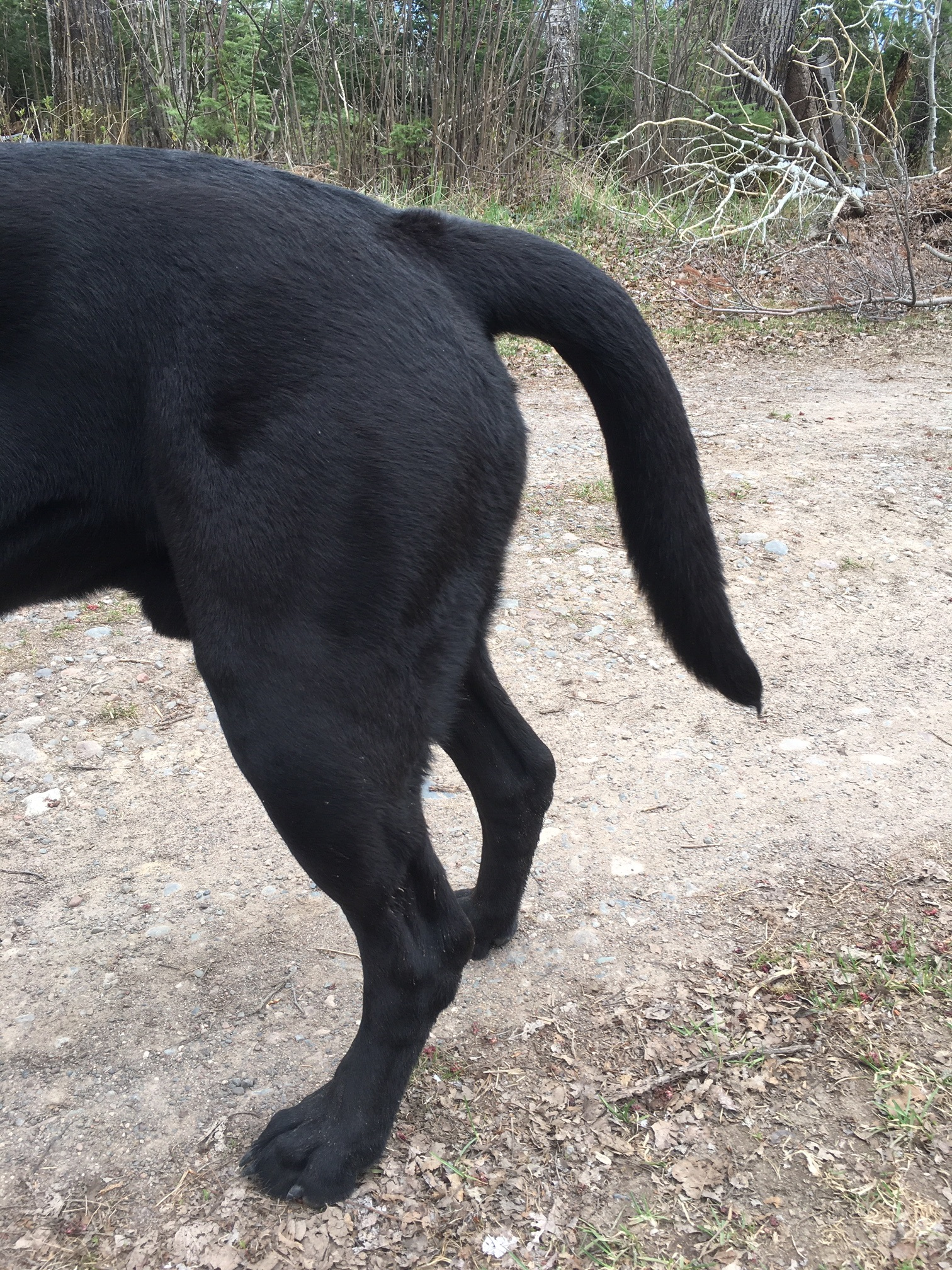
A Labrador Retriever with limber tail syndrome

Limber tail syndrome, or acute caudal myopathy, is a disorder of the muscles in the tail, usually affecting working dogs.

It is an injury occurring mostly in sporting or working dogs such as English Pointers, English Setters, Foxhounds, Beagles, and Labrador Retrievers. Limber tail syndrome is also known as swimmer's tail, cold water tail, broken tail, dead tail, or broken wag.

== Signs and symptoms ==
The injury affects the tail of the dog, causing it to be painful at or near its base. Limber tail can be recognized by a very flaccid tail, or a tail that is held horizontally for approximately 10 cm, and then drops vertically. The condition is also more pronounced in dogs that wag their tails a lot. Some dogs may also pant or shake.

== Cause ==
Limber tail normally occurs shortly (within 24 hours) after swimming in water that is too cold or, on rare occasions, too warm. The actual cause is unknown but it may be caused by the narrowing of the space through which the spinal cord passes, typically due to degenerative change to the inter vertebral disk spaces. These underlying changes may not lead to visible change until the problem is suddenly exacerbated, such as during physical activity, after trauma, etc. Occasionally other changes are seen prior to or in conjunction with limber tail disease, such as urinary or fecal incontinence, postural abnormalities in the pelvic limb, or pain in response to touching the lower back.

== Treatment ==
With rest, the tail returns to normal within a few days. Pain relief, such as a nonsteroidal anti-inflammatory drug may be administered. The symptoms may recur.
