= Small Münsterländer =

Small Munsterlander
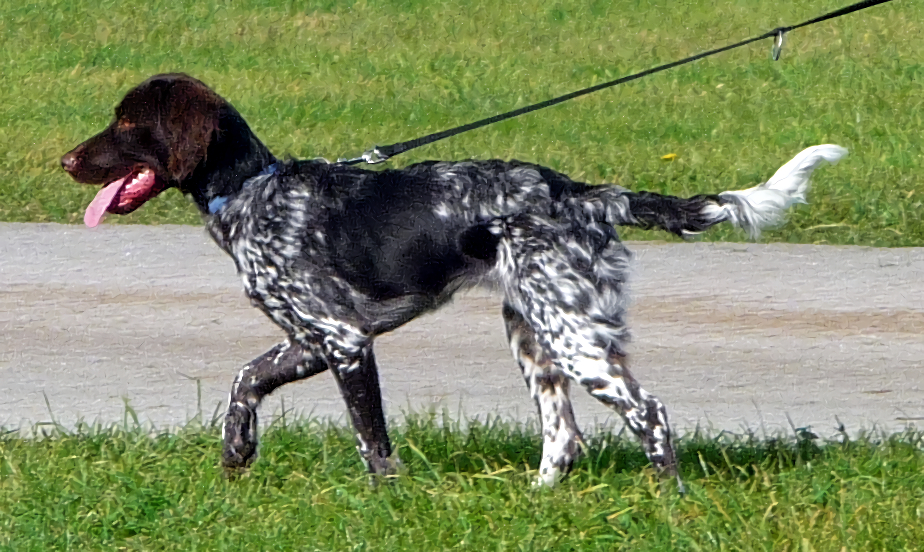
- A Small Münsterländer
- Other names: Kleiner Münsterländer; Munsterlander (Small); Vorstehhund; Spion; Heidewachtel
- Common nicknames: Munster
- Origin: Germany
Kennel club standards
- VDH: standard
- Fédération Cynologique Internationale: standard

The Small Münsterländer (also SM or Kleiner Münsterländer) is a versatile hunting-pointing-retrieving dog breed that reached its current form in the area around Münster, Germany. The Large Münsterländer is from the same area, but was developed from different breeding stock and is not related as the names would suggest. Small Münsterländers bear a resemblance to both spaniels and setters but are more versatile while hunting on land and water. The Small Münsterländer is recognized by the Fédération Cynologique Internationale under Group 7, Section 1.2, Continental Pointing Dogs of Spaniel type, by the American Kennel Club as a Foundation Stock Service breed, and by The Kennel Club and the United Kennel Club as a gun dog. It is related to the Epagneul Français and the Drentsche Patrijshond.

== Description ==
=== Appearance ===
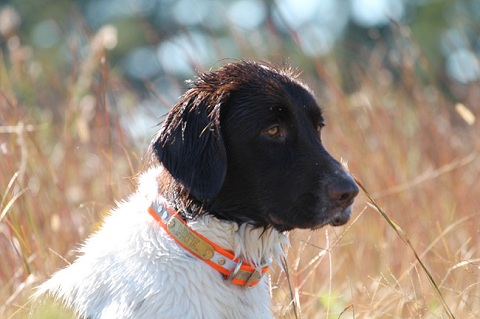
Small Münsterländers should have kind, expressive eyes

Males should stand between 20.5–22 in (52–56 cm), and females should stand between 19.75–21.25 in (50.2–54.0 cm) at the withers. The weight ranges between 38–58 lb (17–26 kg) with the males being the larger of the two. Strong and harmonious build of medium size, showing balanced proportions with a lot of quality and elegance. In upright posture the dog displays flowing outlines with a horizontally carried, well flagged tail. The dog should appear to be strong in the hindquarters and balanced with a distinguished, not too blocky head. Its front legs are well feathered, the hind legs with breeches. The coat should be medium length, glossy, dense, and straight or slightly wavy. The dog's movement should be athletic, graceful and far reaching.

The coloration of the dog is large patches of brown on a ticked or solid white background.

=== Temperament ===
Small Münsterländers are extremely intelligent, trainable, and attentive but require gentle and patient training. Coupled with their intelligence, if they determine an owner to be inconsistent or indecisive, the owner might find that the dog will challenge the owner. For training, both voice and hand signals are used, and a Small Münsterländer will routinely look back to check in with the hunter for silent signals at intervals when on hold or pointing. They have a very strong prey drive and enjoy rewarding their owner with productive hunts. They thrive with hunting or comparable challenging exercise for an hour or more every day. They are strong swimmers, especially when compared to other short-haired hunting breeds.

Lack of regular and sufficient exercise and mental challenge will likely result in unwanted behavior, which is common in highly intelligent, driven breeds. The Small Münsterländer is a happy, affectionate family pet when in the house, while remaining a keenly focused, even driven, hunter-pointer-retriever when in the field. They are not suited to life in a kennel because of their sociable nature and need to interact with people – they need to live in the home of their family. Small Münsterländers will pick an individual person to bond most closely with, typically the one who hunts with the dog, but will revel in the company of the rest of the family as well. When raised with other pets in the household, such as cats, they can coexist happily though they may enjoy a game of chase and point. Unfamiliar small animals outdoors will not be tolerated in the same way.

=== Health ===
Due to the breed organizations, responsible kennels, and owners having a strong commitment to the health of the breed, breed programs are overwhelmingly very selective in breeding dogs that are OFA/Penn Hip, CERF, and temperament clear. As a result, instances of congenital diseases and conditions are extremely low and any dog clearly showing physical or behavioral abnormalities shall be disqualified from the breeding program. The breed is robustly healthy with rare issues save dry skin in colder climates and water in its ears after swimming.

== History ==
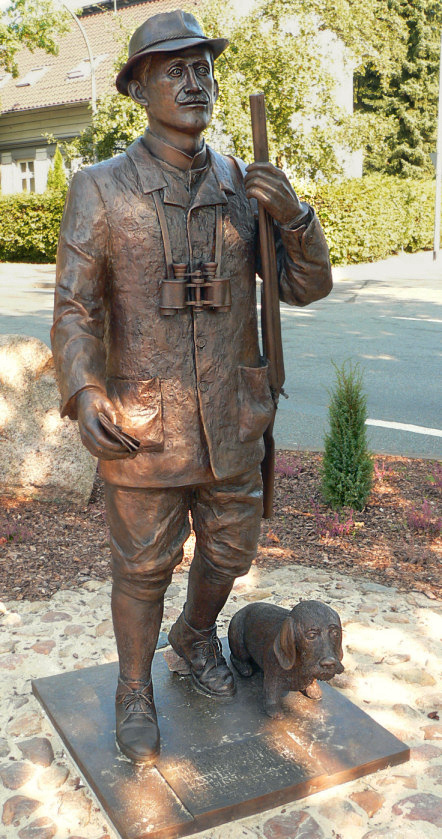
Löns Statue Bronze

Originally a dog bred exclusively for noble families and to work with their families' falconers before guns were used in bird and small game hunting, ancestors of the Small Münsterländer (formerly the Kleiner Münsterländer Vorstehhund) had to work in upland areas to flush prey for the falcon, then allow the falcon to keep the prey until the falconer could retrieve it while the dog pointed at the catch. To this day the Small Münsterländer has excellent close searching and pointing drive. All privileges and immunities of the German nobility as a legally defined class were abolished on August 11, 1919, with the promulgation of the Weimar Constitution, recognising all Germans as equal before the laws of their country. With wider availability of guns and land use for commoners, hunting became more popular, and the breed was further developed as a retriever that worked equally well in the field and water. The breed is considered to be uniquely effective in working as a team with the huntsman in all phases of the hunt, akin to the close cooperation between a sheep herder and Border Collie. It is an elite hunter within the versatile hunting dog arena and is trained to retrieve, hunt, and track the following: woodcock, rail, grouse, dove, partridge, chukar, quail, pheasant, duck, goose, rabbit, deer and fox. The Small Münsterländer is not a far-ranging dog, usually hunting close in heavier cover and ranging 100-150 yards in light cover, all in an effort to maintain the hunting partnership with its owner.

The Small Münsterländer is one of the four oldest versatile breeds and the longhaired versatile hunting dogs evolved from the Small Münsterländer and Flat-Coated Retriever. The Small Münsterländer is thought to be well over 500 years old, originating from the Munster region of Germany but not related to the Large Münsterländer, and documentation of ancestors around the 13th and 14th centuries. By the 1800s the breed had fallen into obscurity. Small Munsterlanders were little known, kept by a few families on farms around Munster. For a half century the few dogs that were bred were primarily companions, and used when hunting to feed the family rather than for sport. It developed a local reputation as the dog to have when a hunter's success or failure determined whether his family would have enough to eat. At the end of the 19th century, a concerted effort was made to re-establish the breed from the remaining lines in the Munster region. The fortunate outcome of the companion phase in the Small Münsterländer history was its excellent in-home personality. Cultural and wildlife use changes slowly put an end to the "bread hunting" and was replaced by recreational hunting. With the advance in firearms, falconry too became outmoded. At the turn of the century, Edmund Lons, brother of the famous hunting and nature poet Hermann Lons, discovered Small Münsterländers in two towns in Lower Saxony. Lons obtained dogs from two lines. One line consisted of fine boned, agile, lively and intelligent dogs, well known for their "track sound" on the trail. Dogs of the other line were slow in search, of strong build, and excellent in their use of nose. The background and breeding of these dogs could be traced for several generations.

== International popularity ==
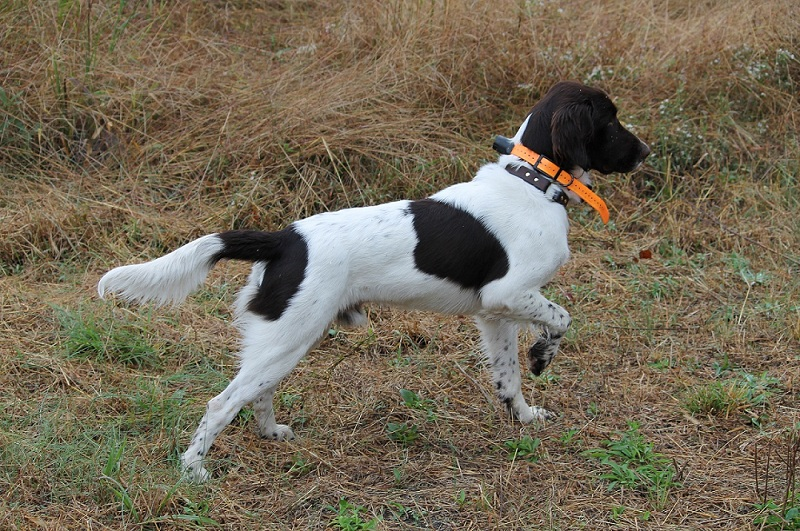
Small Münsterländer on staunch point

The Small Münsterländer is a rare breed in the United States, numbering around 2000, and demand from hunters outstrips the number of available dogs, so breeders typically give preference to hunters. They are especially hard to come by for non-hunters there and regardless are required to have their dog tested in the field and adhere to maintaining an updated health profile. They are more numerous in Germany, Belgium, the Netherlands, Denmark, and the Czech Republic and are bred, trained and tested to high standards to maintain the superior versatility.

Due to very low prevalence and high standards of the breed organizations, kennels and owners having a strong commitment to the health of the breed, breed programs are overwhelmingly very selective in breeding dogs and are required to maintain OFA/Penn Hip, CERF and temperament clear. As a result, instances of congenital diseases and conditions are extremely low.

In the United Kingdom, the breed is rarer still. Recognized by The Kennel Club as an imported breed in 2006, they are still to be established in the hunting community.

== See also ==
- List of dog breeds
