= Pointer (dog breed) =

English breed of gundog

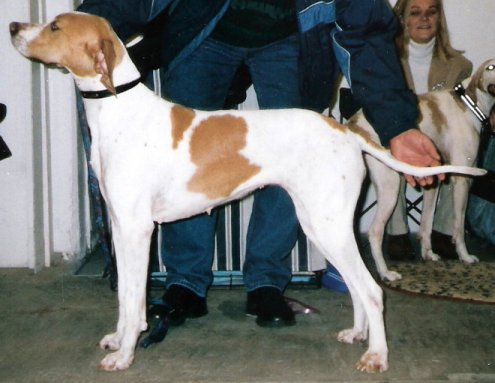
- Orange and white Pointer
- Other names: English Pointer
- Origin: England
Traits
Height	Males	64–69 cm (25–27 in)
	Females	61–66 cm (24–26 in)
Weight	Males	25–34 kg (55–75 lb)
	Females	20–29 kg (45–65 lb)
- Coat: Short, hard and smooth
- Colour: Lemon & white, orange & white, liver & white and black & white; tri-colour and self-colour are known.
Kennel club standards
- The Kennel Club: standard
- Fédération Cynologique Internationale: standard

The Pointer, sometimes called the English Pointer, is a medium-sized breed of pointing dog developed in England. Pointers are used to find game for hunters, and are considered by gundog enthusiasts to be one of the finest breeds of its type; however, unlike most other hunting breeds, its purpose is to point, not retrieve game.

The popular belief is that the Pointer descends from the Old Spanish Pointer that was brought to England from Spain with returning soldiers at the beginning of the 18th century. Once in England, they were crossed with local dog breeds to improve the breed's hunting abilities.

== Etymology ==
The Pointer takes its name from the stance it adopts when it detects the scent of game, "pointing" at the hidden game as a visible signal to the hunter that it has found something and where it is; the breed is sometimes called the English Pointer to differentiate it from other pointing dog breeds. The term "bird dog" is usually used to describe all pointing dogs and setters, but in the United States the term is often used to describe the Pointer breed, particularly south of the Mason–Dixon line.

== History ==
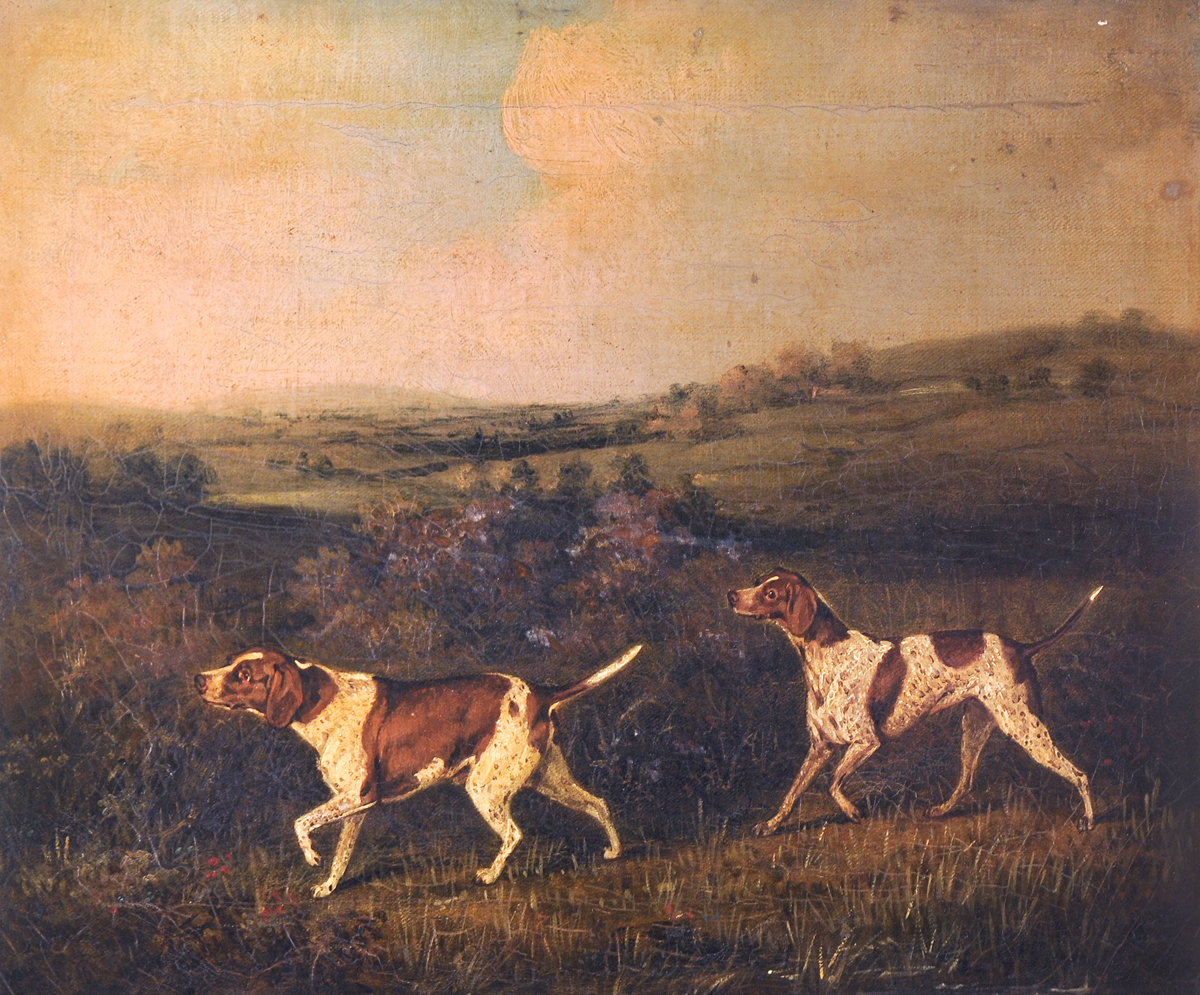
Two Pointers in a landscape, 1805.

There has been much debate among dog historians about the ancestry of the Pointer. The most commonly held position is that the breed descends from Old Spanish Pointers that were imported into England. The popular belief is that Spanish Pointers were first introduced to England in 1713 by soldiers returning from Spain after the Peace of Utrecht. In his Cynographia Britannica, published in 1800, Sydenham Edwards states that the "Spanish Pointer was introduced to this country [England] by a Portugal Merchant, at a very modern period, and was first used by a reduced Baron, of the name of Bichell, who lived in Norfolk, and could shoot flying".

Other early sources suggest Portuguese Pointers, Italian Braccos or French pointers were the foundation of the English breed. In 1902, Victorian era sportsman William Arkwright produced the book The pointer and his predecessors often considered one of the best early histories of the Pointer for which he expended considerable time and money searching continental archives. In the book he notes that he did not find any truly convincing evidence of Spanish Pointers being the foundation stock of the Pointer but still concludes on the basis of all evidence that it is the most likely history. It is noteworthy that in those days dog breeds did not exist as they are known in more modern times, and that a more general pointing type of dog (typically a short haired, hound-like, air-scenting dog with regional variations of appearance that was used for indicating the location of game birds) was known in all of these countries.

A second less commonly held belief is a form of Pointer that was present in England, much earlier than the introduction of the Spanish Pointer, and that they were used from medieval times to indicate the location of hares which were subsequently coursed by greyhounds or caught by hawks; it is held that these dogs were subsequently heavily influenced by the introduction of imported continental European pointer blood.

The earliest recorded mentions of Pointers in England date from the early 18th century. John Gay mentions Pointers being used to hunt partridge in his 1713 poem Rural sports, and Peter Tillemans produced a painting of the Duke of Kingston-upon-Hull's kennel of pointers in 1725.

A compendium of sources state that in England early Pointers were crossed with other breeds to impart certain desirable traits, including setters, bloodhounds and foxhounds, with some mention of Bull Terriers and bulldogs. Early Pointers were comparatively heavy, ponderous dogs able to hold a steady point whilst the hunter readied his gun. With the steady improvement of firearms throughout the 18th and 19th centuries, faster and more agile dogs were sought so Greyhounds were increasingly introduced to add speed. The introduction of Greyhound blood resulted in the modern Pointer being a much finer dog with a comparatively tucked-up loin, tighter lips and low-set tail, more akin to that of the Greyhound than other European pointer breeds.

The Pointer's breed standard was formally adopted in 1936 and has subsequently remained largely unchanged.

== Description ==
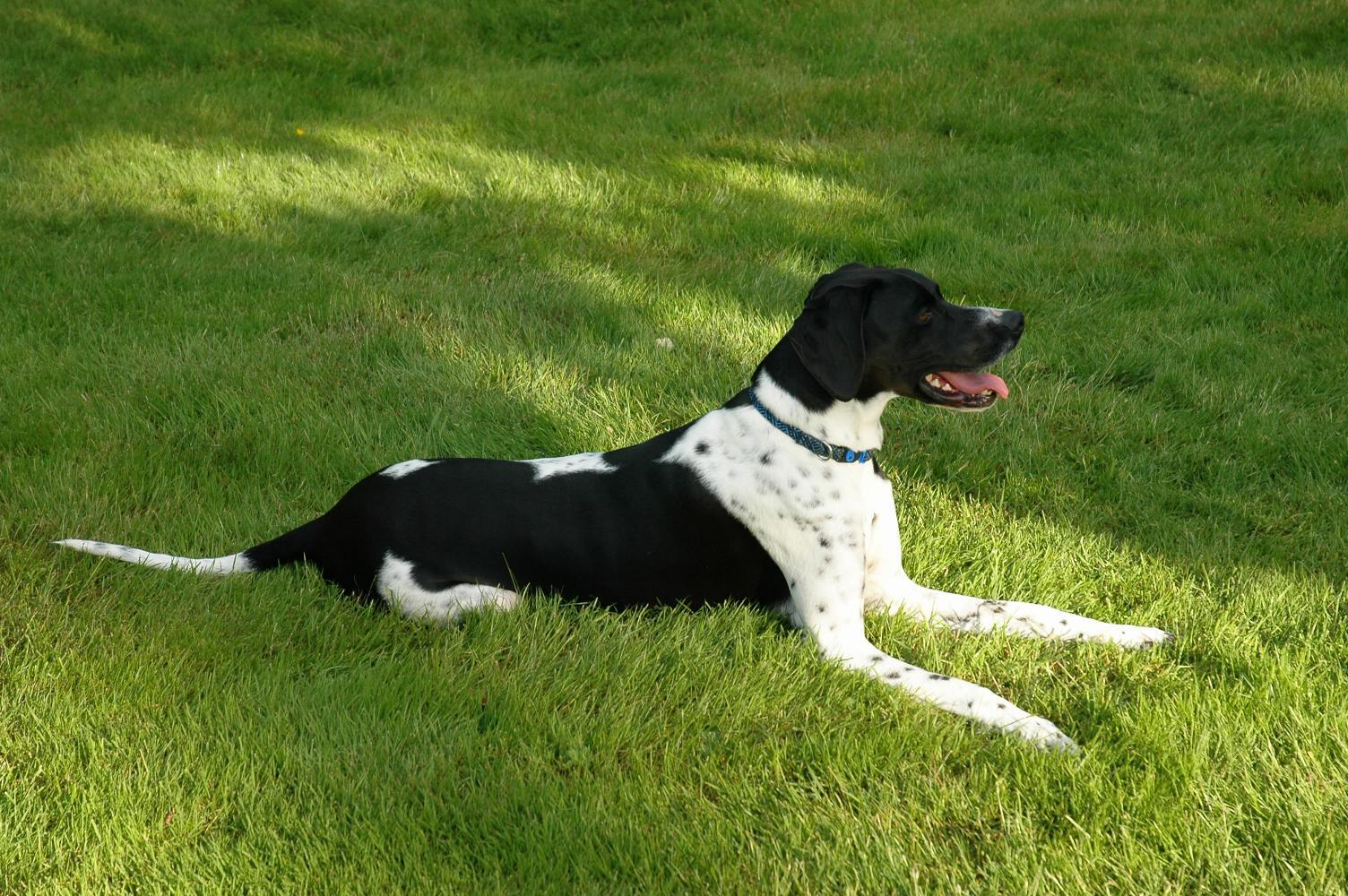
Black and white Pointer

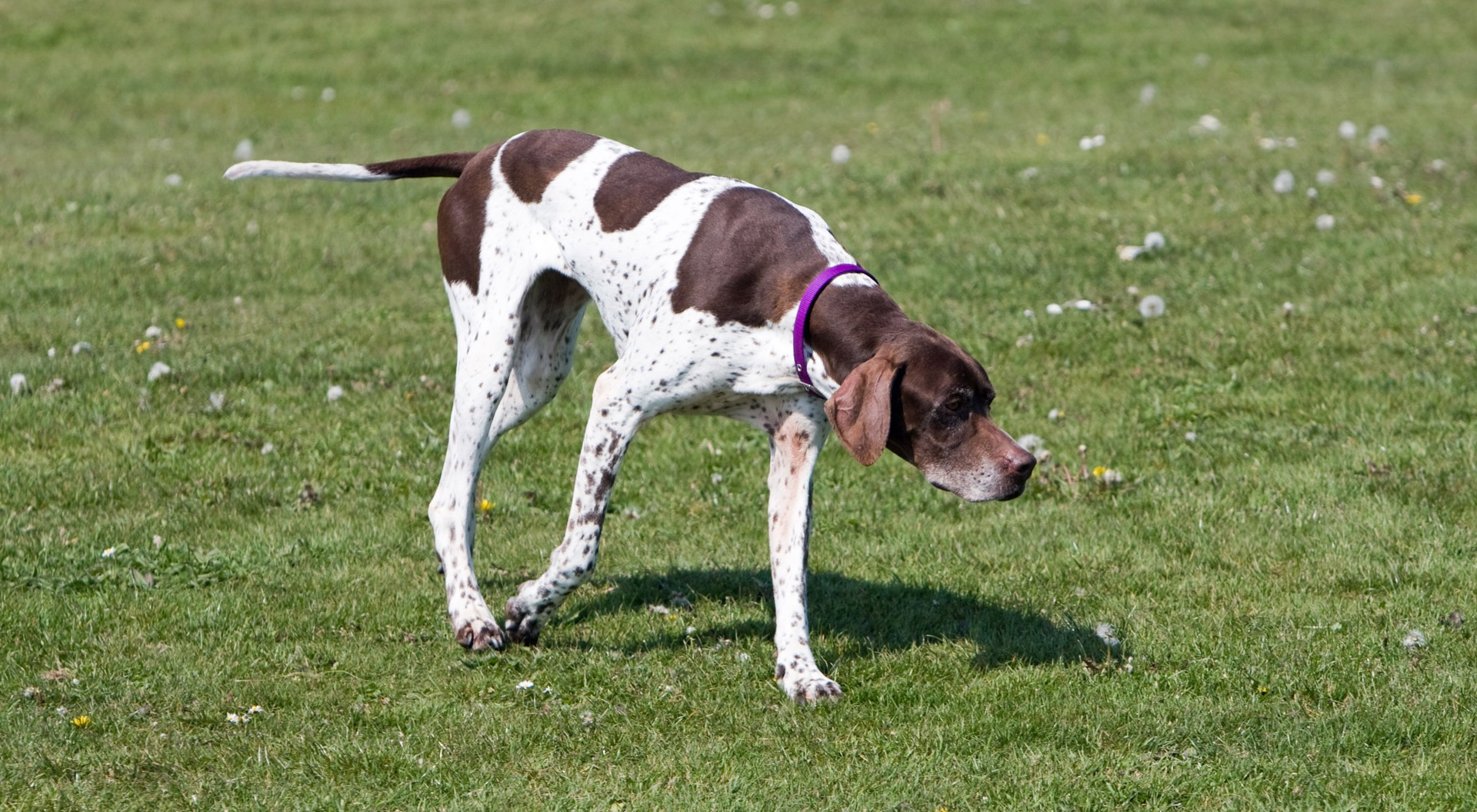
Liver and white Pointer

=== Appearance ===
The Pointer is a medium-sized, athletic breed that is built for both endurance and speed. They typically stand between 53 and 71 centimetres (21 and 28 in) with bitches being shorter than dogs. The breed standard of The Kennel Club states that dogs should stand 64 to 69 centimetres (25 to 27 in) and bitches 61 to 66 centimetres (24 to 26 in). The breed usually weighs between 20 and 34 kilograms (45 and 75 lb), with dogs weighing 25 to 34 kilograms (55 to 75 lb) and bitches 20 to 29 kilograms (45 to 65 lb). The Pointer has a very distinctive head with a slightly dished face and elevated nose, a raised brow, and wide nostrils, their ears are hanging and lie close to the face, are high set, medium-sized, and slightly pointed. The breed standard describes them as having a long, muscular, slightly arched neck; long, sloping shoulders that are well laid back; a chest wide enough for plenty of heart; straight and firm forelegs with good bone; muscular hindquarters; oval shaped feet; and a medium-length tail that is thick at the root. Their coat is short haired, fine, hard, smooth and evenly distributed; they are usually bi-coloured, white with lemon, orange, liver or black coloured patches, whilst rare tri-coloured and self-coloured dogs are also known. The Pointer's short and fine coat makes the breed well suited to working on grouse moors during the summer months but makes them particularly susceptible to feeling cold during wet and cold weather.

When compared to images of pointers from the 19th century the modern breed is a much finer dog, reflecting inclusion of greyhound blood. As with many British gundog breeds, stark differences have emerged between Pointers bred for the purpose of field work and those bred for conformation shows which accent certain features of the breed, such as narrower chests, exaggerated facial features, straighter shoulders, a less natural movement and less muscle than those bred for use as gundogs.

=== Character ===
The Pointer is an adaptable, obedient, even-tempered breed; field lines in particular can be extremely active. Compared to other gundog breeds, the Pointer is more aloof and reserved with a lower need for human companionship, perhaps reflecting the blood of the reserved greyhound in its ancestry.

== Popularity and use in field sports ==
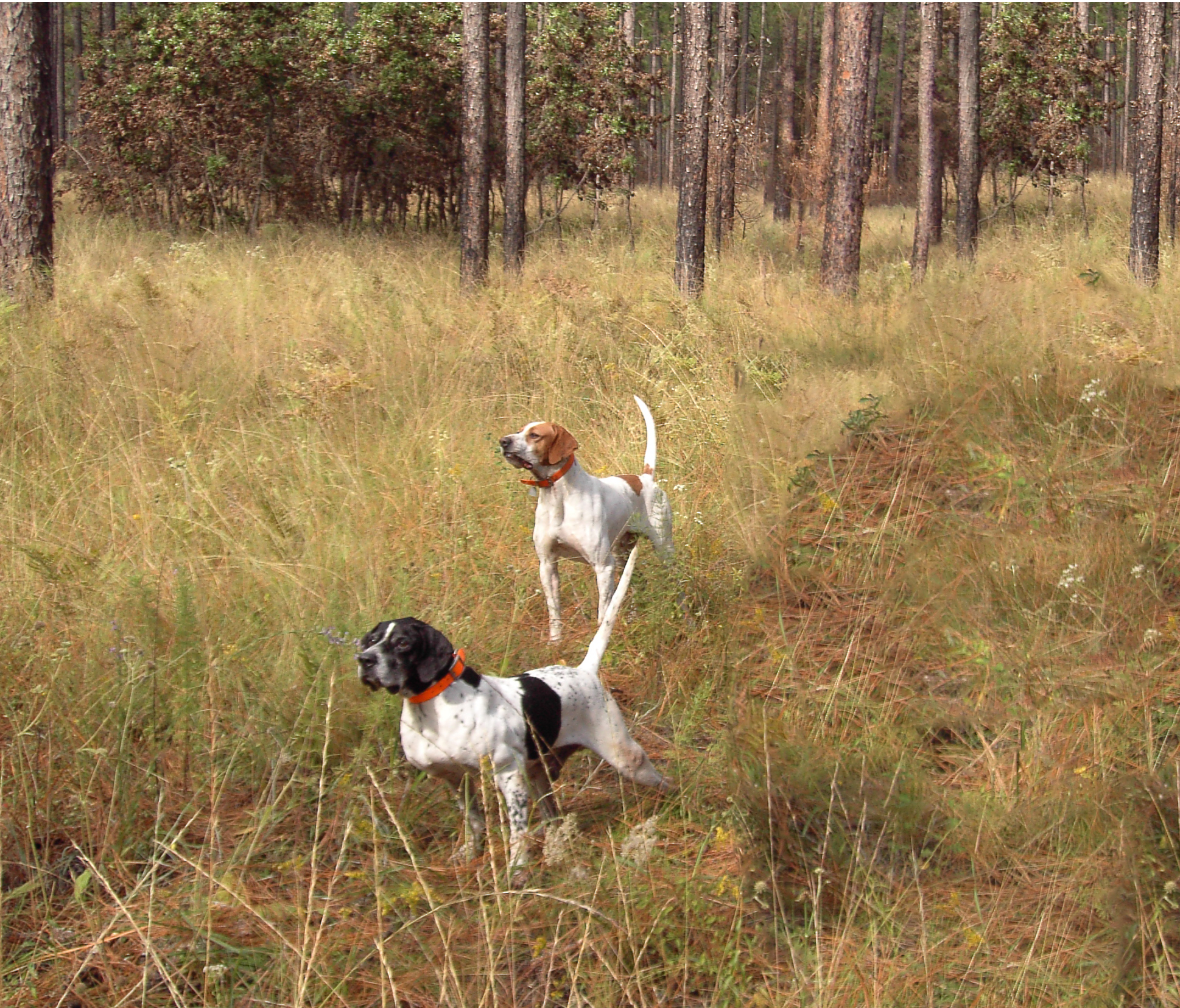
Pointers quail hunting

When hunting, the Pointer quarters in front of the hunter systematically with its head high scenting the air upwind, when a dog detects hidden game it halts suddenly with its nose pointing to the game so the hunter can prepare to shoot, when ready the hunter commands the pointer to flush the game to be shot.

Many writers consider the Pointer to be the ultimate pointing dog breed because of its sensitive nose, big stylish movements and flashy pointing stance. The Pointer is the most popular pointing dog breed used by sporting estates in the United Kingdom and commercial shooting preserves in the United States, they are also the most popular and successful pointing breed used in pointing dog trials in both countries.

When compared to many of the continental European pointing dog breeds, a classically trained Pointer is usually only used to point and flush walked up game before it is shot, and if required specialist retrievers are used to retrieve the game once shot; the European breeds which are often termed "hunt-point-retrievers" or "versatile gundogs" point game and retrieve it once shot. Additionally, compared to the continental European pointing breeds the Pointer is typically faster when working and quarters further in search for game.

The Pointer is also used by falconers and austringers in falconry to locate the game to be flushed for the falcon or hawk to dispatch.

== Health ==
The Pointer is considered a generally healthy breed with a life expectancy of 13–14 years, The Kennel Club does not recommend any genetic or screening tests be conducted for the breed. Known inherited conditions that have been found in the breed include hip dysplasia, elbow dysplasia, patella luxation, hereditary sensory neuropathy, spinal muscle atrophy, X-linked cerebellar ataxia and deafness. The breed has minor predispositions to hypothyroidism, demodicosis, cataracts, retinal dysplasia and corneal dystrophy.

== See also ==
- Judy, awarded the Dickin Medal
