= German Shorthaired Pointer =

German breed of dog

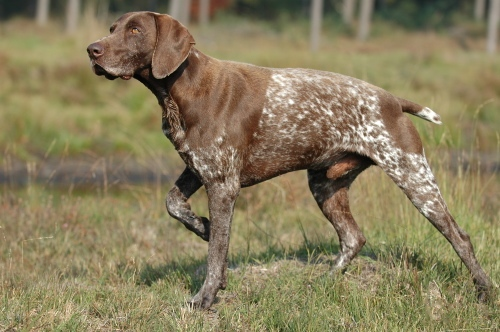
- Dog on point
- Other names: Deutscher Kurzhaariger Vorstehhund; Deutsch Kurzhaar; Kurzhaar; Kurzhaariger Deutscher Vorstehhund; German Shorthaired Pointing Dog; GSP
- Origin: Germany
Traits
Height	Males	62–66 cm
	Females	58–63 cm
Kennel club standards
- Verband für das Deutsche Hundewesen: standard
- Fédération Cynologique Internationale: standard

The German Shorthaired Pointer or Deutsch Kurzhaar is a German breed of continental pointing dog of Braque type. It originated in the nineteenth century in what is now Germany. It is of medium size, and is an all-purpose gun dog suitable for hunting and retrieving on both land and water. It may also be kept as a companion dog.

== History ==
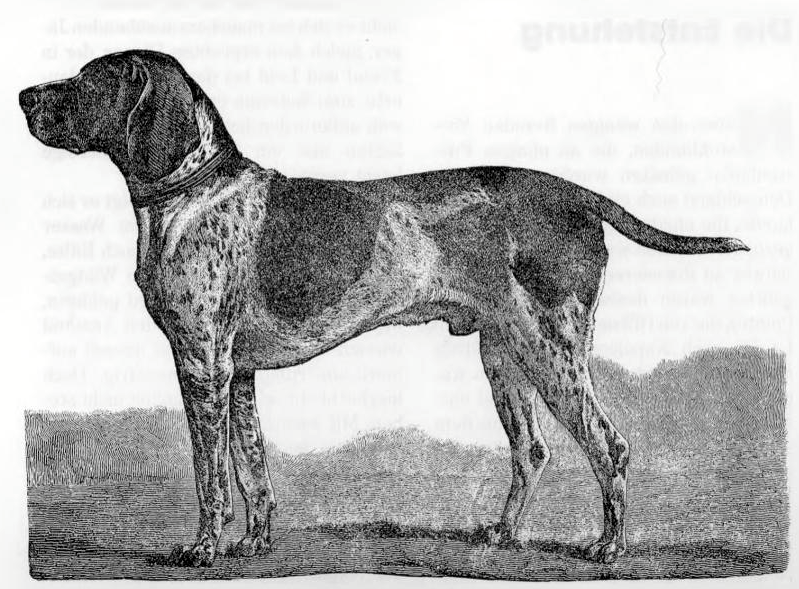
Hector IV, a Short-haired German Pointer, illustration from 1884

The pointing dog breeds of Europe all derive from the now-extinct Old Spanish Pointer, which spread through France and the Low Countries and reached the princely houses of the German-speaking world, where at first they were used in bird-hunting with nets or falcons, and later by huntsmen with guns. Bird dogs were also brought from England; Carl von Heppe, in his Aufrichtiger Lehrprinz of 1751, describes these as taller and stronger than the local type. In the nineteenth century large numbers of dogs of Burgos Pointing Dog type were brought to Germany. In the early part of that century, the resulting mixed population had no specific name – the dogs were called Hühnerhunde ('bird dogs') or Jagdhunde ('hunting dogs').

In 1878, at the annual dog show of the Verein zur Veredelung der Hunderassen in Frankfurt am Main, it was agreed that breed standards for German dogs would be established at the show to be held in Hannover in 1879; standards for both the Deutsch Kurzhaar and the Deutsch Langhaar were introduced in that year. The first stud-book for the Kurzhaar was published in 1897.

The Kurzhaar was definitively accepted by the Fédération Cynologique Internationale in 1954. In 2013, it was in twenty-second place on a list of the most-registered dog breeds worldwide. In the fifteen years from 2007 to 2021, the annual number of new registrations in Germany averaged about 1300, with a low of 1102 and a high of 1842.

It was recognised by the American Kennel Club in 1930; a three-year-old dog of this breed was classed "best in show" at the Westminster Kennel Club Dog Show in 2016.

== Characteristics ==
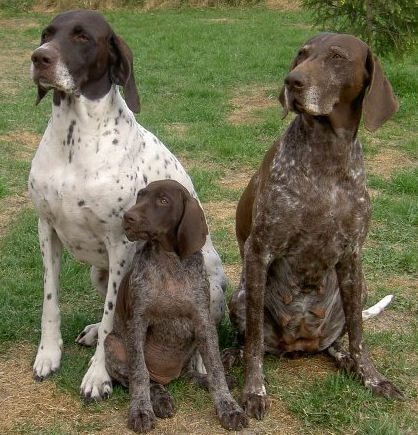
Liver roan (right) with liver patches, and ticked with liver patches (left)

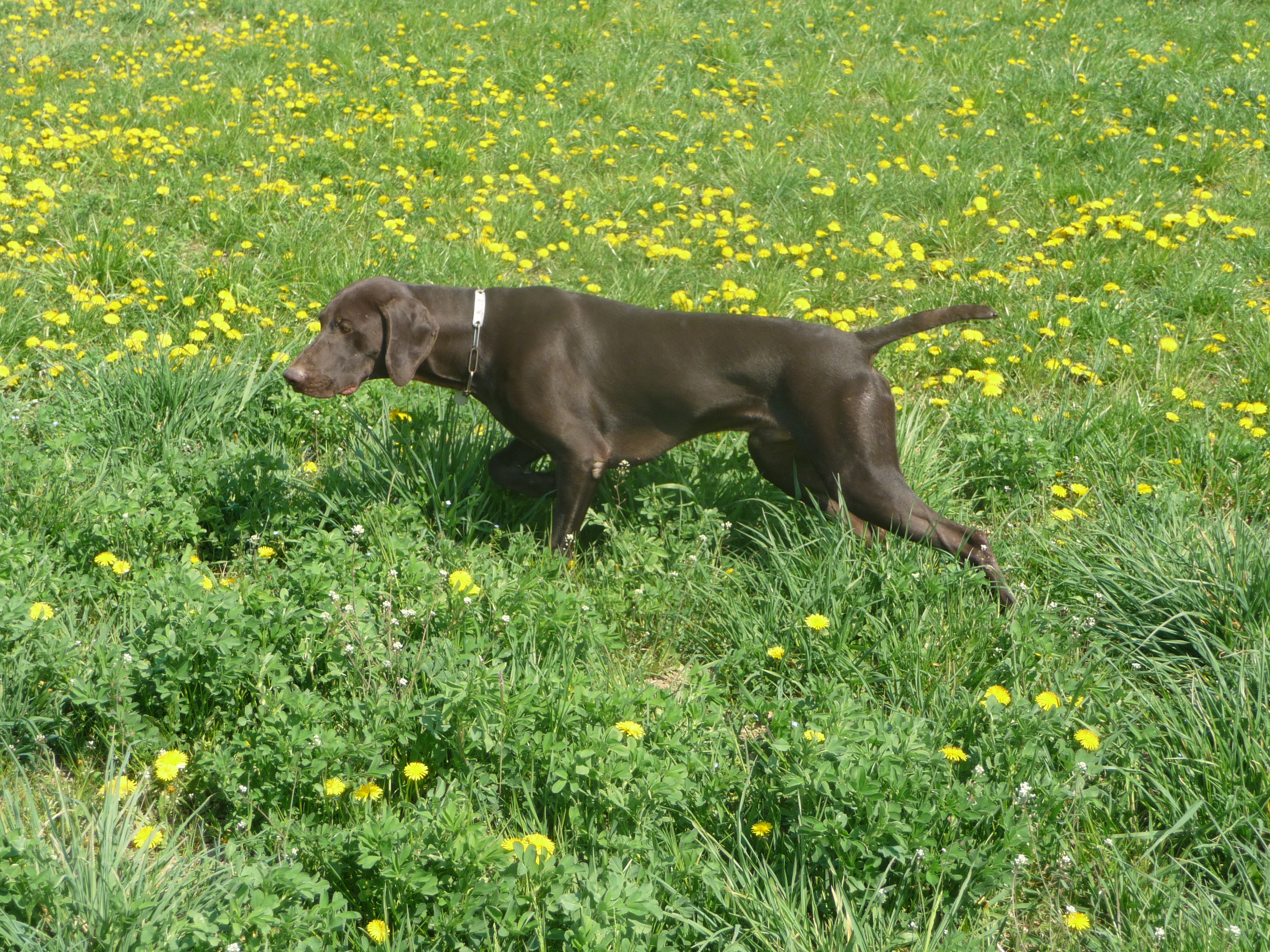
Solid brown

The German Shorthaired Pointer is of medium size: dogs stand some 62–66 cm at the withers, bitches some 3 or 4 cm less. The coat is dense, short and rough-textured. It may be either brown or black, in any of three patterns: the solid-coloured, either with or without small flecks of white on the chest and legs; the white, with coloured head and coloured flecks or patches on the body; and the roan, either dark – in which coloured hairs predominate over white – or light, in which there are more white than coloured hairs.

The head is of moderate size, with a convex profile and a long, broad, and strong muzzle suitable for carrying game; the eyes are brown, the ears are rounded and set on high, and hang close to the head. Where not prohibited, the tail of a working dog may be docked to about half its length; it is carried roughly horizontally when the dog is moving and hangs down when it is at rest.

It is a tough, healthy dog. A 2024 UK study found a median longevity of 13.4 years for the breed, slightly above the average of 12.5 for all dogs. The breed has some genetic predisposition to neurological diseases including coccygeal muscle injury, GM2 gangliosidosis, hemivertebrae, pyogranulomatous meningoencephalomyelitis and sensory neuropathy. Other disorders associated with the breed include cataract, cranial cruciate ligament rupture, eversion of the cartilage of the nictitating membrane, hereditary lupoid dermatosis, progressive retinal atrophy, nasal carcinoma, oropharyngeal neoplasia, Von Willebrand's disease and XX sex reversal.

== Uses ==
The German Shorthaired Pointer was bred to be a versatile all-round gun dog. It is capable of working in all weathers, on all terrains and in all types of cover; of finding and pointing to game, whether feathered or furred; of retrieving gently both in water and on land; of following a blood trail to find wounded game; and of defending against poachers and predators. Registration is subject to successful completion of a working trial.

In addition to hunting and field trials, German Shorthaired Pointer performs well in many dog sports such as agility, dock diving, and obedience. German Shorthaired Pointers are also used in law enforcement for nosework, such as the detection of illicit substances.
