= Old Spanish Pointer =

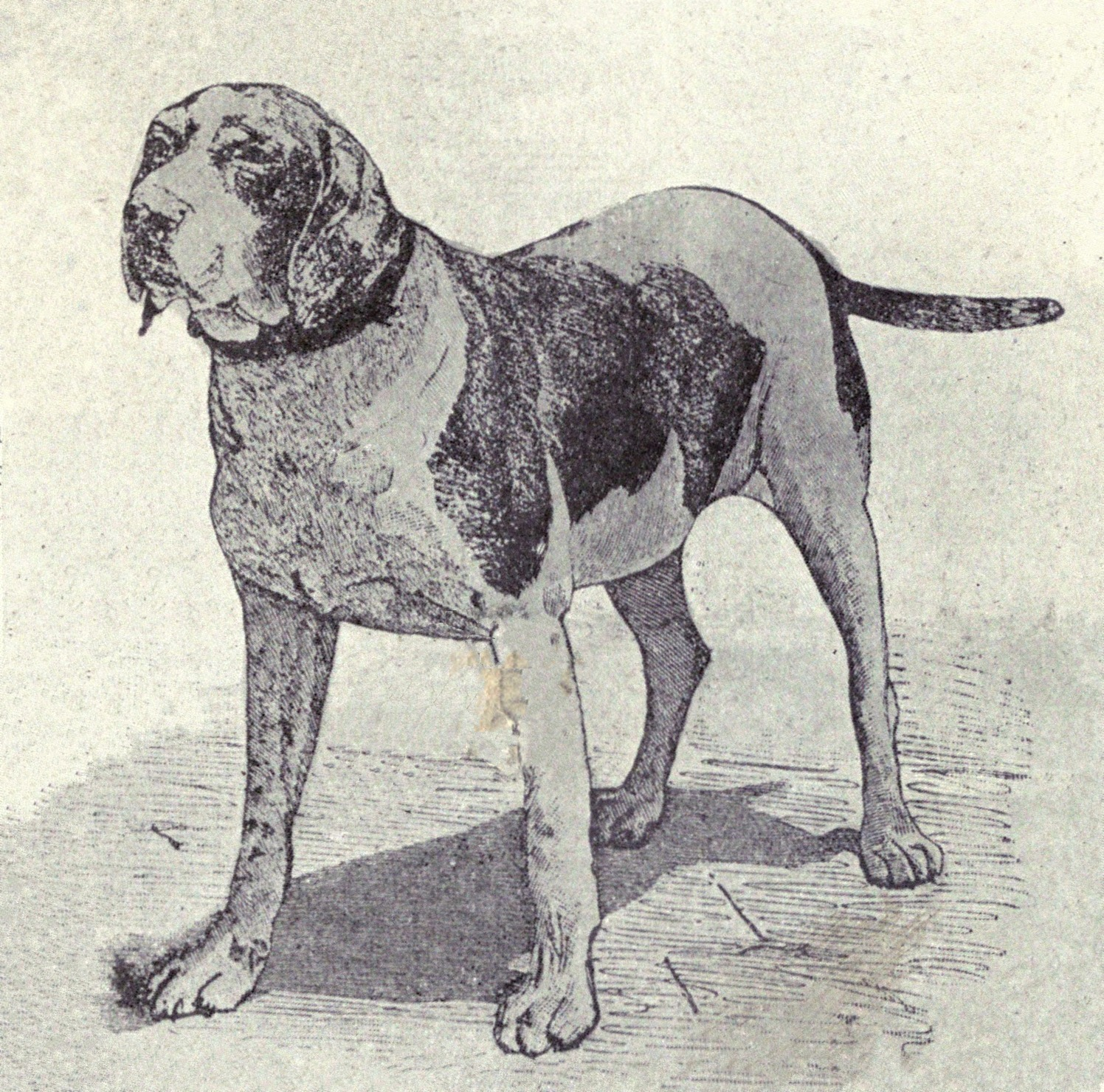
- Old Spanish Pointer in 1915
- Other names: Perro de Punta Español; Spanish Pointer; Old Spanish Perro de Punta; Braco Español
- Origin: Spain
- Breed status: Extinct

The Old Spanish Pointer, or Perro de Punta Español, is an extinct breed of Spanish pointing dogs known from the Early Modern Period; it is considered the first of its type from which all modern pointing dog breeds descend. It was used for hunting in Spain and England.

It was likely introduced to England some time during the early the 18th century, where it was known as the Spanish pointer. Various stories exist as to how the breed was imported. It was possibly introduced by a Portuguese merchant, or perhaps brought back to England by officers returning from the War of the Spanish Succession.

The Old Spanish Pointer was a medium sized muscular dog, larger than the English pointer, and with a broad chest. In terms of colouration, it was typically a mix of white with either brown, red, or black. Breed standards also allowed for the dog to be completely brown.

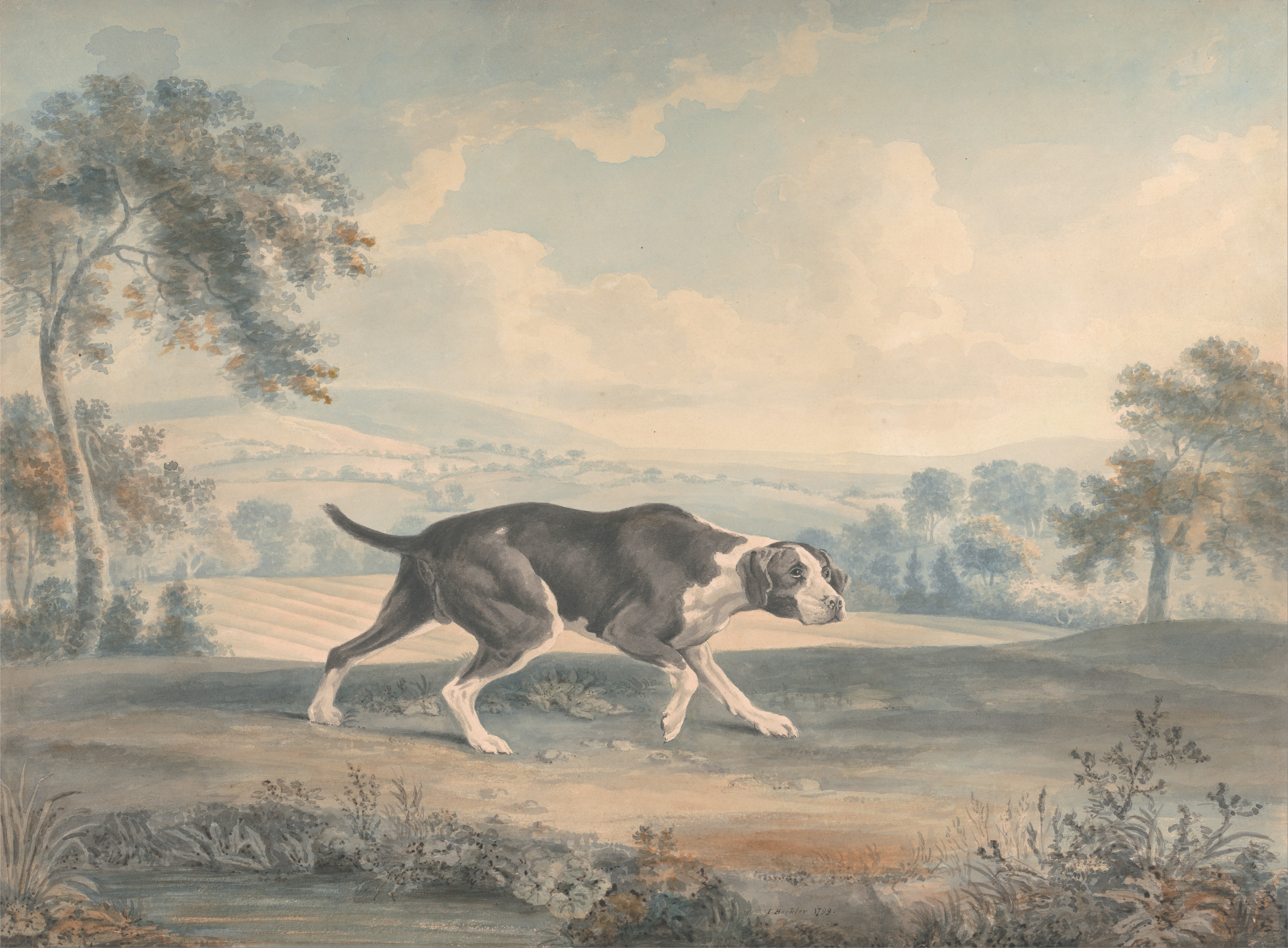
The Spanish Pointer by John Buckler (c. 1799). Currently, this painting is in the Yale Center for British Art in Connecticut, US.
