= Hypomyelination-congenital cataract syndrome =

- Other names: HCC
- Specialty: Medical genetics
- Prevention: None
- Prognosis: Medium
- Frequency: rare, only 24 cases have been described in medical literature
- Deaths: -

Hypomyelination-congenital cataract syndrome is a rare autosomal recessive hereditary disorder that affects the brain's white matter and is characterized by congenital cataract (or cataracts that begin in the first two months of life), psychomotor development delays, and moderate intellectual disabilities. It is a type of leukoencephalopathy.

== Signs and symptoms ==
Children with this condition are born with congenital cataract (or they have an early-onset cataract which presents before two months of life). These cataracts are caused by hypomyelination, which is the body's inability of producing nerve fiber myelin. Development is normal for kids with this condition until the age of 1 year of life, when development and learning start slowing down, although they can learn how to walk.

Other symptoms such as intellectual disabilities, cognitive impairment, epilepsy, ataxia, spasticity, trunk hypotonia, hyperreflexia, tremors, and difficulties with speech are also seen in patients.

=== Complications ===
Due to the hypomyelination mentioned beforehand, individuals with this condition start losing sensation in their arms and legs, something which is known medically as peripheral neuropathy.Although walking can be achieved by the age of 1, it can be impaired later in life due to a progressive scoliosis and muscle weakness with accompanying muscle atrophy which are often seen in patients with the condition.

Congenital cataract results in visual impairment.

== Genetics ==
HYCC1

Identifiers
- Aliases: HYCC1, DRCTNNB1A, HCC, HLD5, family with sequence similarity 126 member A, FAM126A
- External IDs: OMIM: 610531; MGI: 2149839; GeneCards: HYCC1
Available structures
PDB	Ortholog search: PDBe RCSB
PDB	List of PDB id codes 5DSE

Gene location (Human)
Chr.	Chromosome 7 (human)
Band	7p15.3	Start	22,889,371 bp
Band	7p15.3	End	23,014,130 bp

Gene location (Mouse)
Chr.	Chromosome 5 (mouse)
Band	5|5 A3	Start	24,120,274 bp
Band	5|5 A3	End	24,235,688 bp
RNA expression pattern
Bgee	Human / Mouse (ortholog); Top expressed in: Achilles tendon; endothelial cell; sural nerve; synovial membrane; gingival epithelium; synovial joint; epithelium of colon; deltoid muscle; ganglionic eminence; superficial temporal artery / Top expressed in: fetal liver hematopoietic progenitor cell; trigeminal ganglion; sciatic nerve; atrioventricular junction; atrium; atrioventricular valve; medial ganglionic eminence; blood; Gonadal ridge; olfactory tubercle; More reference expression data
BioGPS	n/a
Gene ontology
Molecular function	protein binding; signal transducer activity
Cellular component	cytosol; plasma membrane; membrane; neuron projection; cytoplasm
Biological process	phosphatidylinositol phosphate biosynthetic process; myelination; signal transduction; protein localization to plasma membrane
Sources:Amigo / QuickGO
Orthologs
Databases	NCBI: entry; OMA: entry
Species	Human	Mouse
Entrez	84668	84652
Ensembl	ENSG00000122591	ENSMUSG00000028995
UniProt	Q9BYI3	Q6P9N1
RefSeq (mRNA)	NM_032581; NM_001363466; NM_001363467	NM_053090; NM_001310471
RefSeq (protein)	NP_115970; NP_001350395; NP_001350396	NP_001297400; NP_444320
Location (UCSC)	Chr 7: 22.89 – 23.01 Mb	Chr 5: 24.12 – 24.24 Mb
PubMed search
- Wikidata
View/Edit Human	View/Edit Mouse

This condition is caused by autosomal recessive mutations in the HYCC1 gene (previously called FAM126A), located in chromosome 7. These mutations can either be deletions, loss-of-function, or be caused by amino acid substitutions. These mutations prevent FAM126 from making hyccin, this absence of hyccin is what causes the impaired ability of producing myelin in individuals with this condition.

Other mutations involved in hypomyelination-congenital cataract syndrome actually allow the production of a reasonable amount of hyccin, individuals with this kind of mutations don't experience peripheral neuropathy and they keep the ability of walking for a longer period of time than those who have the more common loss-of-function FAM126A mutations.

== Management ==
The walking impairments can be managed with physical support.

The congenital catact can be managed with intraocular lens corrective surgery, after this surgery, contact lenses can be used for the child to be able to see correctly.

== Prevalence ==
According to OMIM, 24 cases from 13 families in Turkey and Italy have been described in medical literature.

== See also ==
- Hypomyelination
- Congenital cataract
