= English Setter =

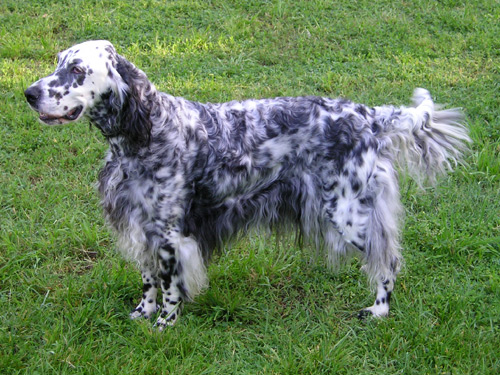
- A blue belton English Setter
- Other names: Lawerack; Laverack; Llewellin (or Llewellyn) Setter; Ryman-type (or Old Hemlock) Setter
- Origin: England
Kennel club standards
- The Kennel Club: standard
- Fédération Cynologique Internationale: standard

The English Setter is a medium-size breed of dog. It is part of the setter group, which includes the red Irish Setters, Irish Red and White Setters, and black-and-tan Gordon Setters. The mainly white coat has long silky fringes on the back of the legs, under the belly and on the tail. The coat features flecks of colour (known as ticking), and the different colour varieties are referred to as 'belton'.

As a gun dog, it is used to hunt for game such as quail, pheasant, and grouse. It is sometimes referred to as the Laverack or Llewellin Setter as these were famous strains of the breed during the major development period in the 19th century. Those from hunting stock are generally of a finer build and with less coat than those bred for show exhibition.

== Description ==
=== Appearance ===
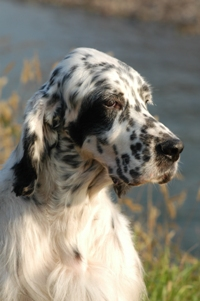
The head of a female English Setter

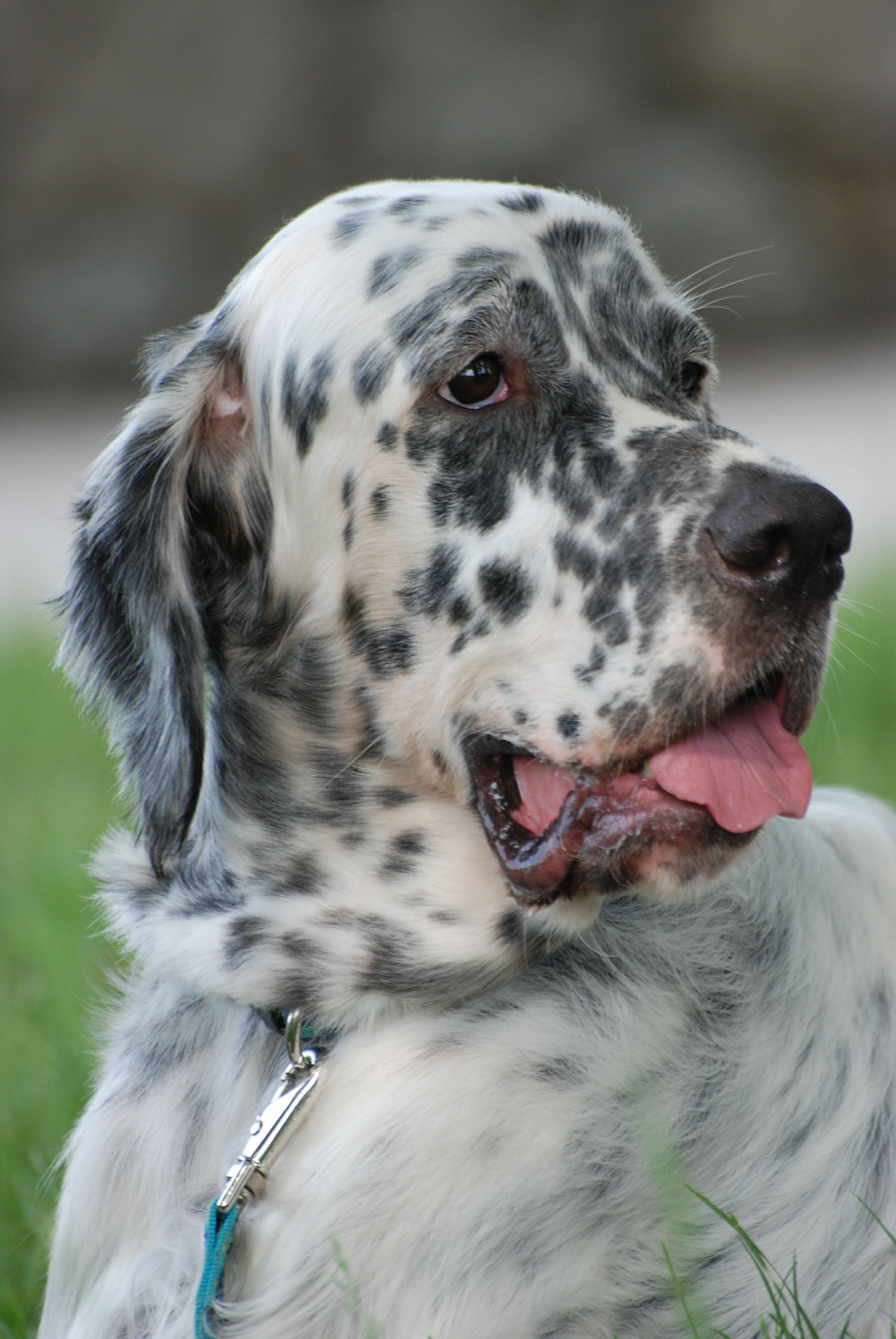
The head of a male English Setter

The English Setter is a medium-sized dog which should have an elegant overall appearance. Its size can range from 24 inches (61 cm) for females up to 27 inches (69 cm) for males. The field or hunting type can be finer in build and construction than those from bench or show lines. The breed was designed to hunt game such as quail, pheasant, and grouse so should be able to cover a lot of ground when seeking the airborne scent of the birds, carrying its head high. The head should be slightly domed with a muzzle of good depth and show chiselling under the eyes, which should be dark in colour with a kind, gentle expression. The top of the ears (sometimes the ears are referred to as "leathers") are positioned in line with the eyes and lie in an elegant fold. It has a long muscular neck, well angled shoulders and a brisket of good depth. The body is of a moderate length proportionate to its height and it has strong powerful hindquarters. It carries its tail in line with its back and the tail should be long enough to reach the hock.

The main body coat is short to medium length, lies flat and has a silky texture. Long silky coat – usually called "feathering", forms fringes on the outside of the ears, neck, chest, down the back of the front legs, under the belly and on the back legs. The tail is also feathered with long coat. The body coat and feathering should be straight and flat but not profuse and never curly although a slight wave can be seen.

The bench or show type has a long, flowing coat that requires regular grooming. The field or hunting type has a shorter coat that requires less grooming.

The base colour of the coat is white with differing coloured ticking also called flecks or speckling. The various speckled coat colours when occurring in English Setters are referred to as belton; valid combinations are white with black flecks (blue belton), white with orange flecks (orange belton), white with orange flecks and lighter nose (lemon belton), white with liver flecks (liver belton), or "tricolour", which is blue or liver belton with tan markings on the face, chest, and legs. The flecking should not form large patches on the body and the flecks should be distributed all over the body. The use of the word "belton" was coined by Laverack, who developed the breed in the 19th century, to describe his ideal for flecking and is also the name of a village in the extreme north of England. Puppies' coats may not have all the markings that they have as adults.

English Setter

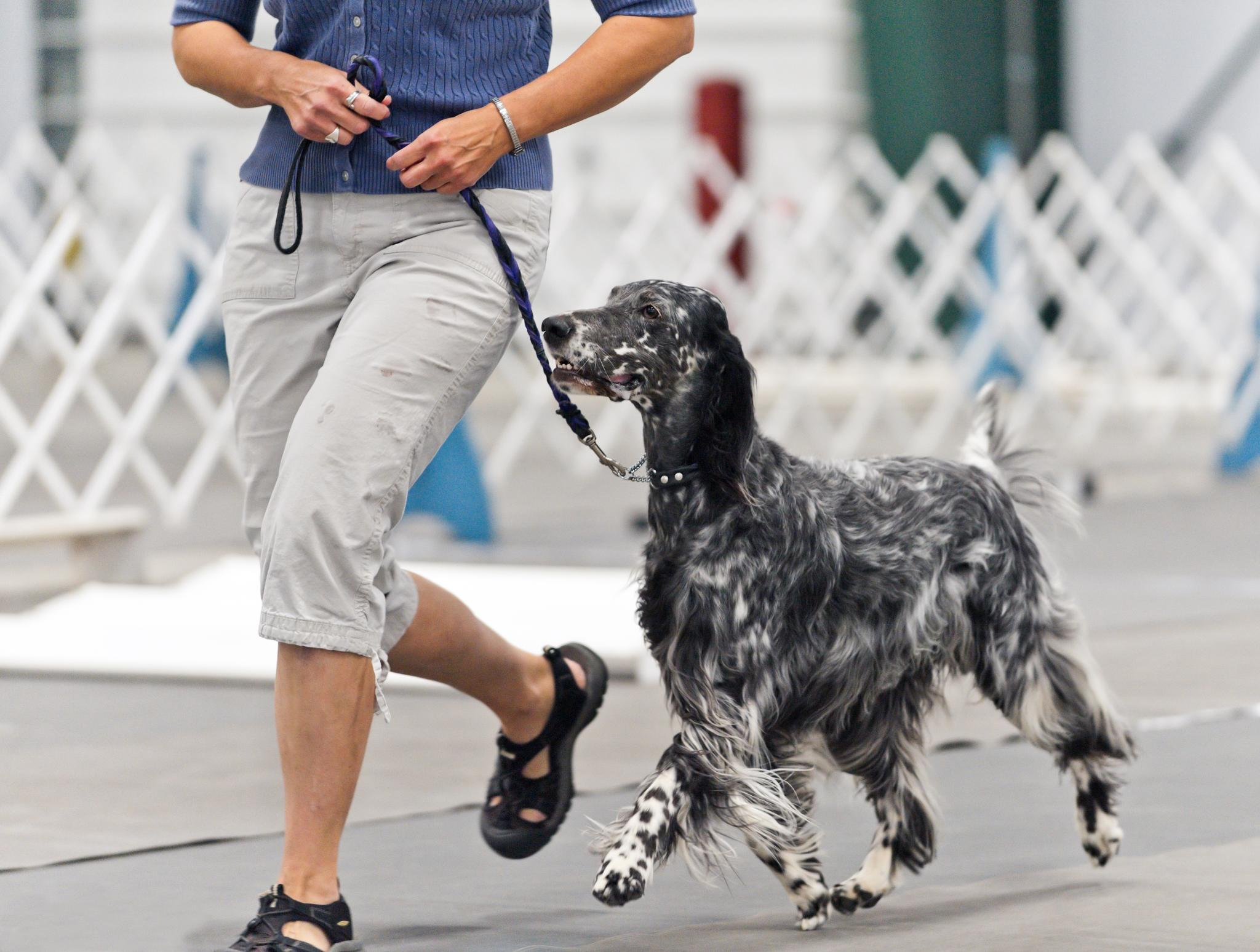
A blue belton English Setter

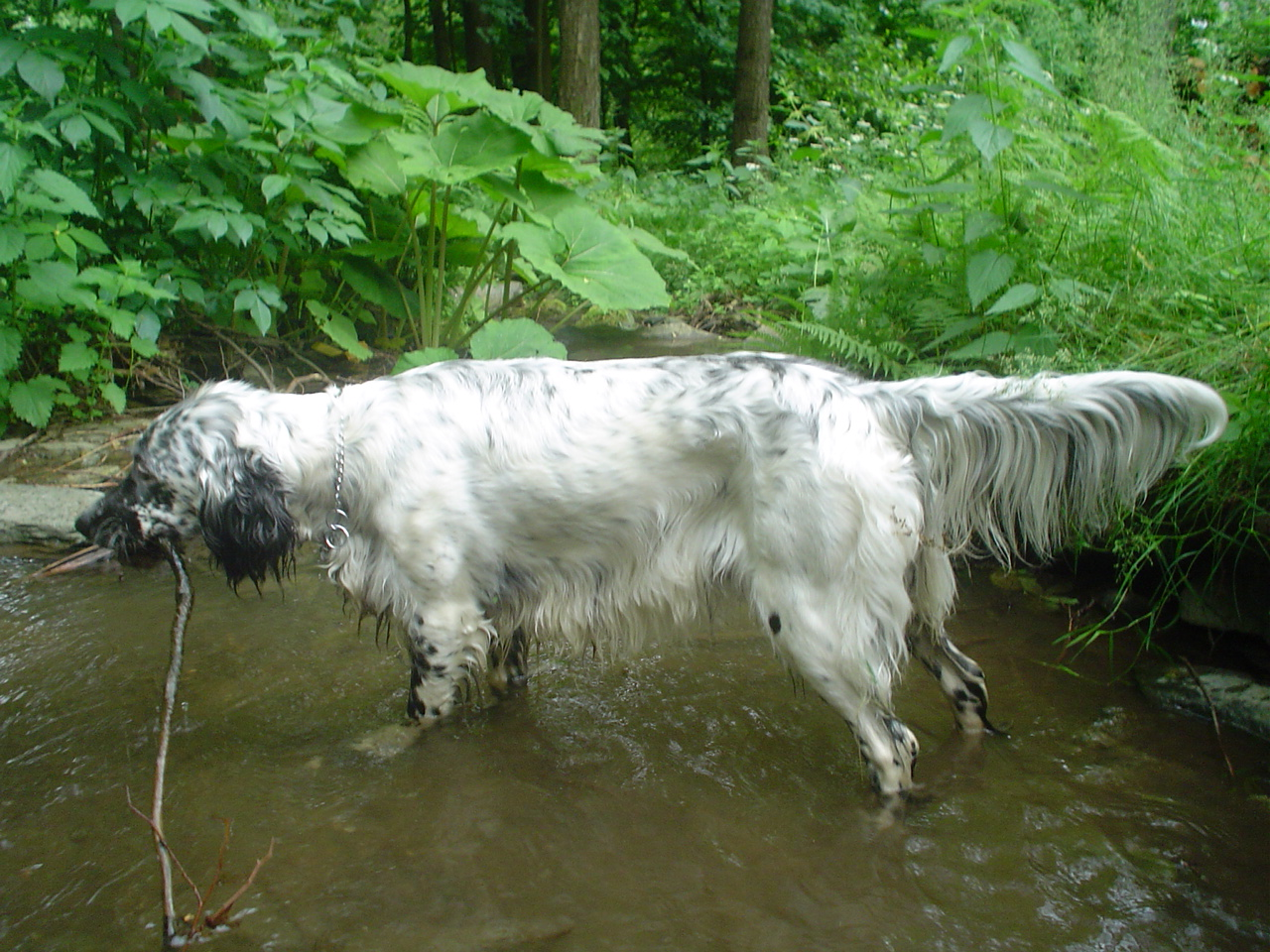
An English Setter's tail has long feathering.

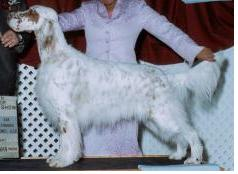
Coat white with orange flecks

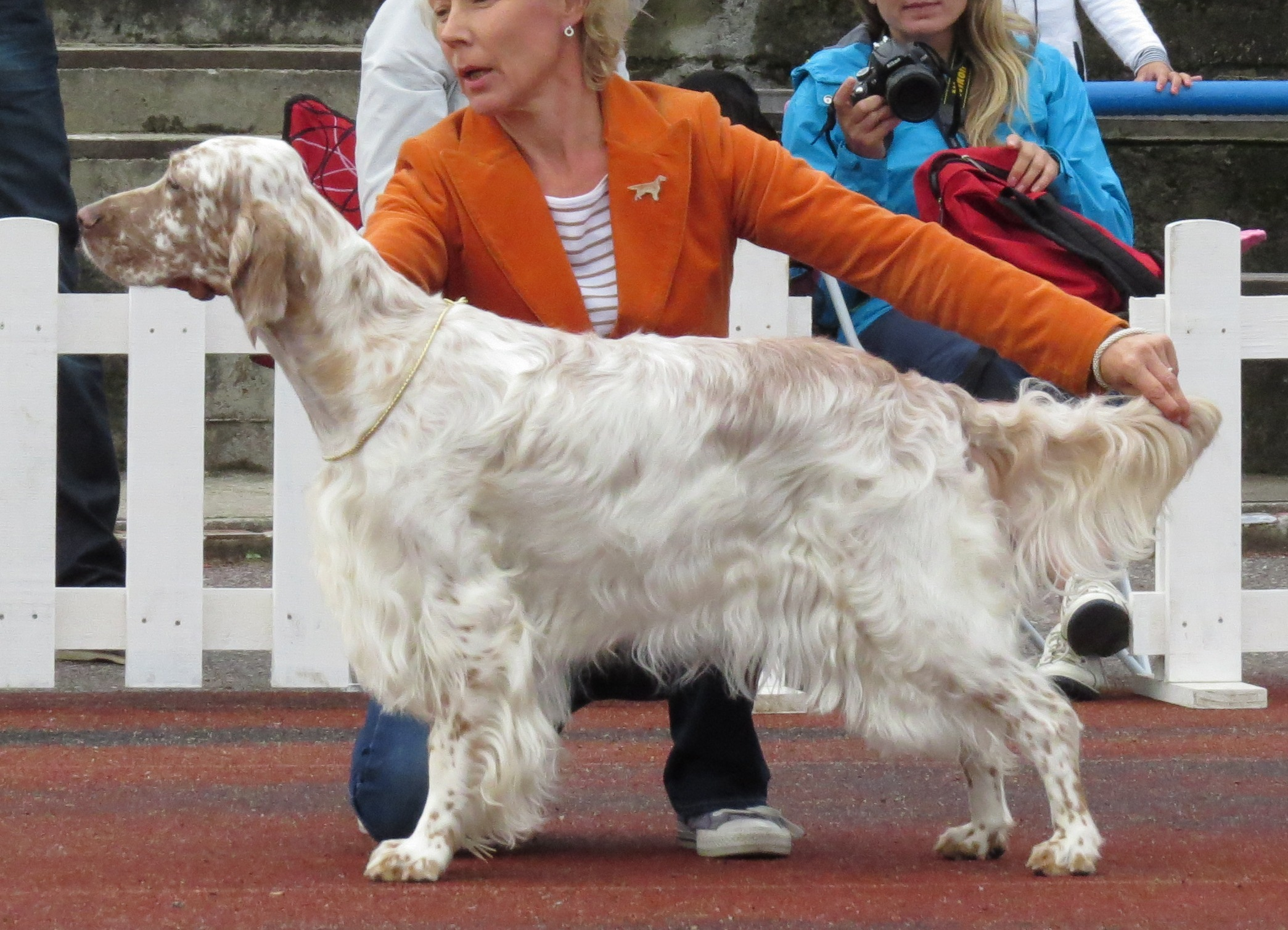
An orange belton

=== Temperament ===
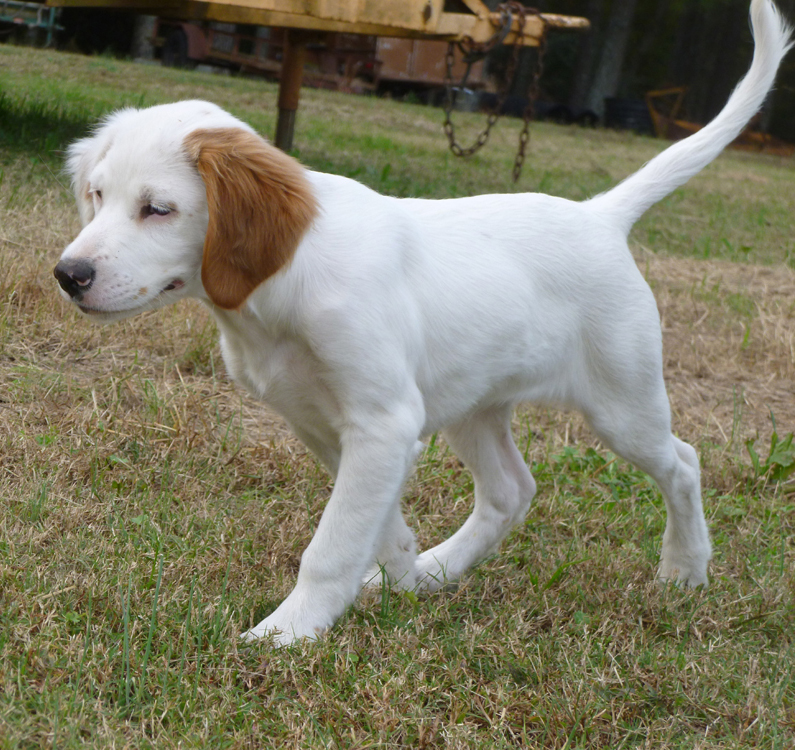
An English Setter puppy when the colour markings on the body are not yet fully developed

This breed's standard temperament is best described as a "Gentleman by Nature". However, it can also be strong-willed and mischievous, especially if coming from working/field breeding lines. English Setters are energetic, people-oriented dogs, that are well suited to families who can give them attention and activity, or to working with a hunter, where they have a job to do. They are active dogs that need plenty of exercise and up to two hours a day of exercise is recommended. Inside they tend to be lower energy and love to be couch potatoes and lap dogs; the breed is described as "intensely friendly," "good natured," and "adores visitors and is particularly happy with children."

They rank 37th in Stanley Coren's The Intelligence of Dogs, being of above average working/obedience intelligence. English Setters are very intelligent and can be trained to perform about any task another breed can do, with the exception of herding. However, they are not always easy to train, as their natural bird instinct tends to distract them in outdoor environments. Their temperament is considered to be gentle and as English Setters can be very sensitive to criticism, positive reinforcement training methods using treats and praise work best when undertaking basic training.

== Health ==
A 2024 UK study found a life expectancy of 13.1 years for the breed compared to an average of 12.7 for purebreeds and 12 for crossbreeds. A 2024 Italian study found a life expectancy of 10 years for the breed compared to 10 years overall.

Dogs, both pedigree and cross breeds, can be affected with genetic problems. Those known to sometimes occur in English Setters can include congenital deafness, which was reported as affecting 12.4 percent of the 701 English Setters tested by the Louisiana State University in 2010. As at 2013, there has not been any detailed research on this condition undertaken in the UK; autoimmune thyroiditis, which was shown to affect 26.2 percent of 747 English Setters examined between January 1974 until December 2012 in an Orthopedic Foundation for Animals listing; canine hypothyroidism; elbow dysplasia; and allergies, which can include some sensitivity to certain food ingredients and also skin conditions, are known to occur.

The breed is predisposed to atopic dermatitis.

== Function ==
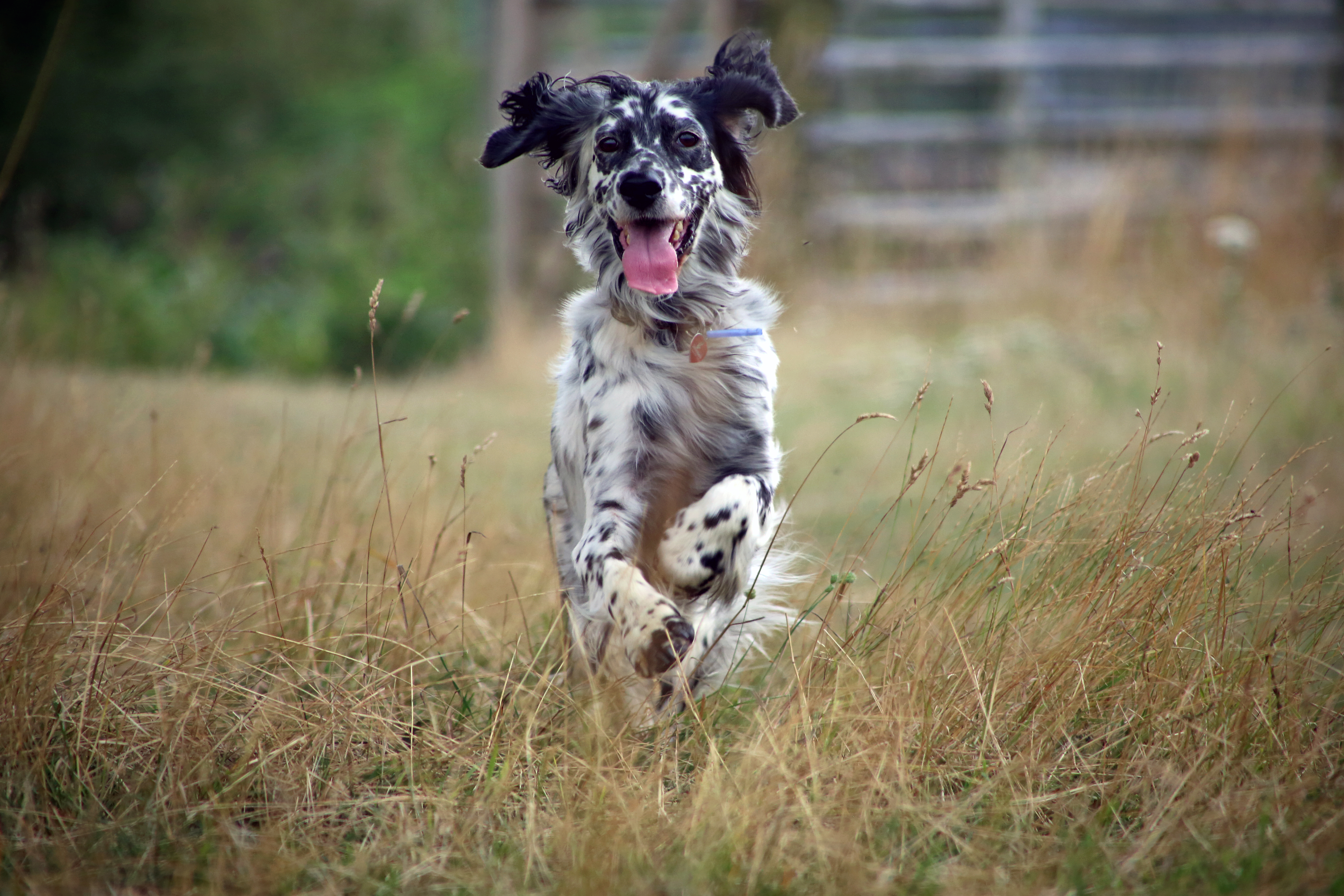
An English Setter in action, pursuing a bird.

Setters hunt by ranging over large distances in a systematic, methodical manner, silently seeking game by scent. When prey is found by scenting the air, the dog will freeze rather than give chase. The dog will stop in a sort of crouch or "set" by freezing in a standing position upon finding their quarry and this distinctive stance is how the term "setter" evolved. Once the dog has indicated where the birds are by freezing on point, on command it would then slowly creep forward to disturb the birds into flight. Once the birds were in flight the hunter who had been following the dog would release hawks to capture the birds in the air. When netting superseded the use of hawks, setting dogs would still be used to indicate the whereabouts of the birds, but the hunter would come up behind the dog and throw a net over the birds. In the mid-1600s, guns became more readily available and shooting game birds became a popular pastime of the landed gentry. The basic work of setters was still to find and point to the location of game birds but it also had to be steady to shot.

The scent of game birds is airborne so to pick up this scent the setter carries its head well up and should never follow foot scent. Most setters are born with a natural proclivity to hunting. Dogs that show excitement and interest in birds are described as being "birdy", and trainers look for puppies that show this particular trait. Training is usually done with quail as a first choice or domesticated pigeons.

Writing in 1876, Arnold Burges described the "pure-blooded English Setter" as "the best animal for American upland shooting" in his book The American Kennel and Sporting Field.

== Early history ==
"Setting dogges" is an old term used for setters and the original purpose of the English Setter was to set or point upland game birds. From the best available information, it appears that the English Setter was a trained bird dog in England more than 400 years ago and there are works of art created in the early 15th century showing dogs that are discernible as being of a "setter type". There is evidence that the English Setter originated in crosses of the Spanish Pointer, large Water Spaniel, and English Springer Spaniel, which combined to produce an excellent bird dog with a high degree of proficiency in finding and pointing game in open country.

Writing in 1576, Dr Johannes Caius states: "There is also at this date among us a new kind of dogge brought out of Fraunce, and they bee speckled all over with white and black, which mingled colours incline to a marble blewe". Argue speculates this may be a description of the blue belton colour found in English Setters.

Caius went on to describe the dog called a setter using the Latin name index:

Another sort of Dogges be there, serviceable for fowling, making no noise either with foote or with tongue, whiles they follow the game. They attend diligently upon their Master and frame their condition to such beckes, motions and gestures, as it shall please him to exhibite and make, either going forward, drawing backeward, inclinding to the right hand, or yealding toward the left. When he hath founde the byrde, he keepeth sure and fast silence, he stayeth his steppes and wil proceede no further, and weth a close, covert watching eye, layeth his belly to the grounde and so creepth forward like a worme. When he approaches neere to the place where the byrde is, he layes him downe, and with a marcke of his pawes, betrayeth the place of the byrdes last abode, whereby it is supposed that this kind of dogge is calles in Index, Setter, being in deede a name most consonant and agreeable to his quality.

By the 17th century setters, or "setting dogges", had become established and were widespread on British estates, although the evolution into the more specific individual breeds of setters occurred at a later date. The interbreeding of the different colours was still taking place during this period but it gradually changed and sportsman/breeders began to segregate matings to dogs adapted to the terrain it was required to work on.

== Breed development ==
The modern English Setter owes its appearance to Edward Laverack (1800–1877), who developed his own strain of the breed by careful breeding during the 19th century in England and to another Englishman, Richard Purcell Llewellin (1840–1925), who founded his strain using Laverack's best dogs and outcrossed them with the Duke, Rhoebe and later Duke's littermate Kate bloodlines with the best results.

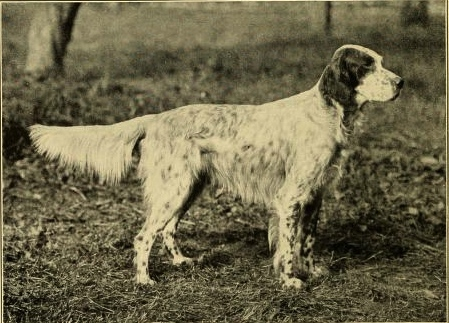
Ch Mallwyd Sirdar, an English Setter from the Laverack bloodline. He was said to be admired by both fanciers and shooting men.

Historically, many dogs descending from the same bloodline were referred to by the name of their breeder or owner and the nomenclatures "Laverack Setter" and "Llewellin Setter" describe English Setters bred by Laverack and Llewellin. Horace Lytle, one time gundog editor of Field & Stream, author and a well-known gundog trainer, clarified this in the book "How to train your bird dog", which he wrote in 1928:

Another tremendous uncertainty exists among the widest possible class of hunters with reference to the so-called Llewellin Setters. Llewellin Setters are nothing more – and nothing less – than English Setters. Llewellin Setters are simply English Setters that trace back to two particular English Setters. They represent a certain definite English Setter ancestry. That's all there is to it. Thus an English Setter may not always be a "Llewellin"; but a "Llewellin" is always an English Setter. Furthermore, the craze for this particular strain that came to this country with the importation of the first "Llewellins" caused ninety per cent of the owners of all Setters that are not either distinctly Irish or Gordon, to refer to their dogs as "Llewellins". Yet in ninety per cent of these cases, the dogs so referred to are not of the Llewellin strain at all. Not one person in a hundred who owns an English Setter can tell even from the pedigree whether the dog is of the Llewellin strain or not. They simply don't know. Most of those who refer to their Setters as "Llewellins" do so because the name is rather euphonious and pleasing to pronounce. Many of those who really do know, insist that their Llewellins be one hundred per cent, and they refer to those that are not as "grades". If there is even as little as 3 per cent "outcross," these few are inclined to feel that the dog is nothing but a rank plebeian. All of which is really ridiculous – at least so think a good many of us who have thought the matter out.

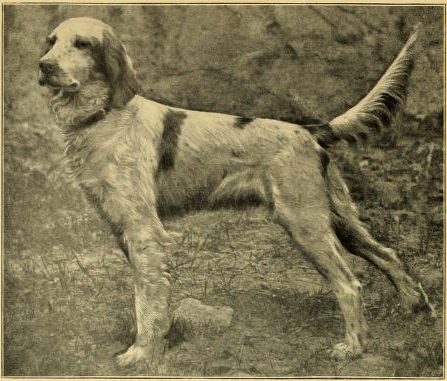
Rodfield's Pride, an English Setter from the Llewellin bloodline. He won several stakes in the autumn of 1902.

Around 1826, Reverend A Harrison of Carlisle in Cumbria sold a male dog called "Ponto" and a female named "Old Moll" to Laverack and this pair formed the foundation of his English Setters. Laverack did not know the exact pedigree of these dogs but maintained the strain had been pure-bred for the previous thirty-five years. Laverack closely inbred to these two dogs for generations and his bloodline was successful in dog shows and as a working dog in field trials.

In 1874, C. H. Raymond from Morris Plains, New Jersey imported the first English Setter from the Laverack bloodline to America. The working setter Count Noble descended from these early imports and is commemorated in the Carnegie Museums of Pittsburgh. Llewellin's strain was based on Laverack's best dogs, which were then outcrossed with the bloodlines of his dogs Duke, Rhoebe and later Duke's littermate, Kate. It was Kate bred with Laverack's best hunting males that produced Llewellin's ideals Fd.Ch.Ch. Armstrong's Dash II and later Fd.Ch.Ch Dashing Bondhu. They were the foundation of Llewellin's personal strain known as "Dashing Bondhu". William Humphrey (1882–1963) inherited them from Llewellin in 1925 and continued them pure until his death in 1963. Jim the Wonder Dog, described as a Llewellin setter, was said to have "possessed an occult power" and there is a bronze statue of him in a memorial garden on the square in Marshall, Missouri, built to commemorate him.

== In competitions ==
The field type and show type English Setter look very different, even though they are the same breed. Field type setters are often smaller and are seen with less feathering and usually more distinctive spotting than show type setters. Both traits are beneficial in the field: less feathering makes getting burs out of their coat easier and the spotting makes them easier to see in the field.

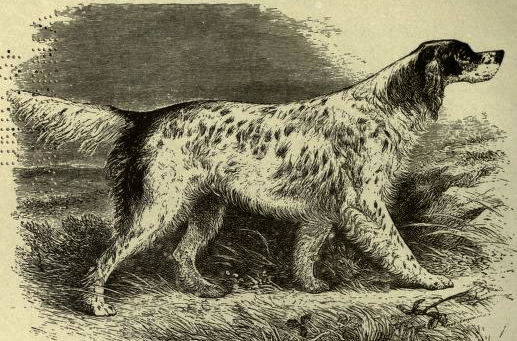
"Countess" the first gundog Dual Champion. She was bred by Laverack and owned/handled by Llewellin.

English Setters are classified within the gundog group in the UK and the Sporting group in America and Canada. The FCI place them in section 2, British and Irish Pointers and Setters, of Group 7.

In the English Setter breed, compared to other breeds, there are very few Dual Champions. The Kennel Club have four champion titles available to be achieved by setters competing in the UK. These are Show Champion (Sh Ch) which is awarded to dogs who have won three Challenge Certificates (CCs) under three different judges with at least one CC won after 12 months of age; Champion (Ch) is the title gained by dogs who have won a Sh Ch title plus a field trial award, Diploma of Merit or a Show Gundog Working Certificate; Field Trial Champion (Ft Ch) means the dog has won a pointer or setter open stake or two first prizes at two different stakes under two different A Panel judges. There must be no less than 16 runners entered; and a Dual Champion – the highest award available to setters – is a dog who has achieved the titles of Show Champion and Field Trial Champion.

An English Setter called "Countess" was the first gun dog to ever attain a Dual Champion title. She was sired by Dash 2nd and her dam was Moll 3rd. Her breeder was Laverack, who sold her to Sam Lang; he in turn passed her on to Llewellin in whose name she was entered in field trials.

In the U.K., the breed has been successful at Crufts and secured the award of Best in Show in 1964, 1977 and 1988. At the Westminster show in America an English Setter won the Best in Show title in 1938. He was only 11 months old and at his first show. This was before entry to the show was restricted to Champions in 1992. As of 2013, he is the only setter to achieve Best in Show at Westminster since the award of Best in Show started to be made in 1907.

== Registrations ==
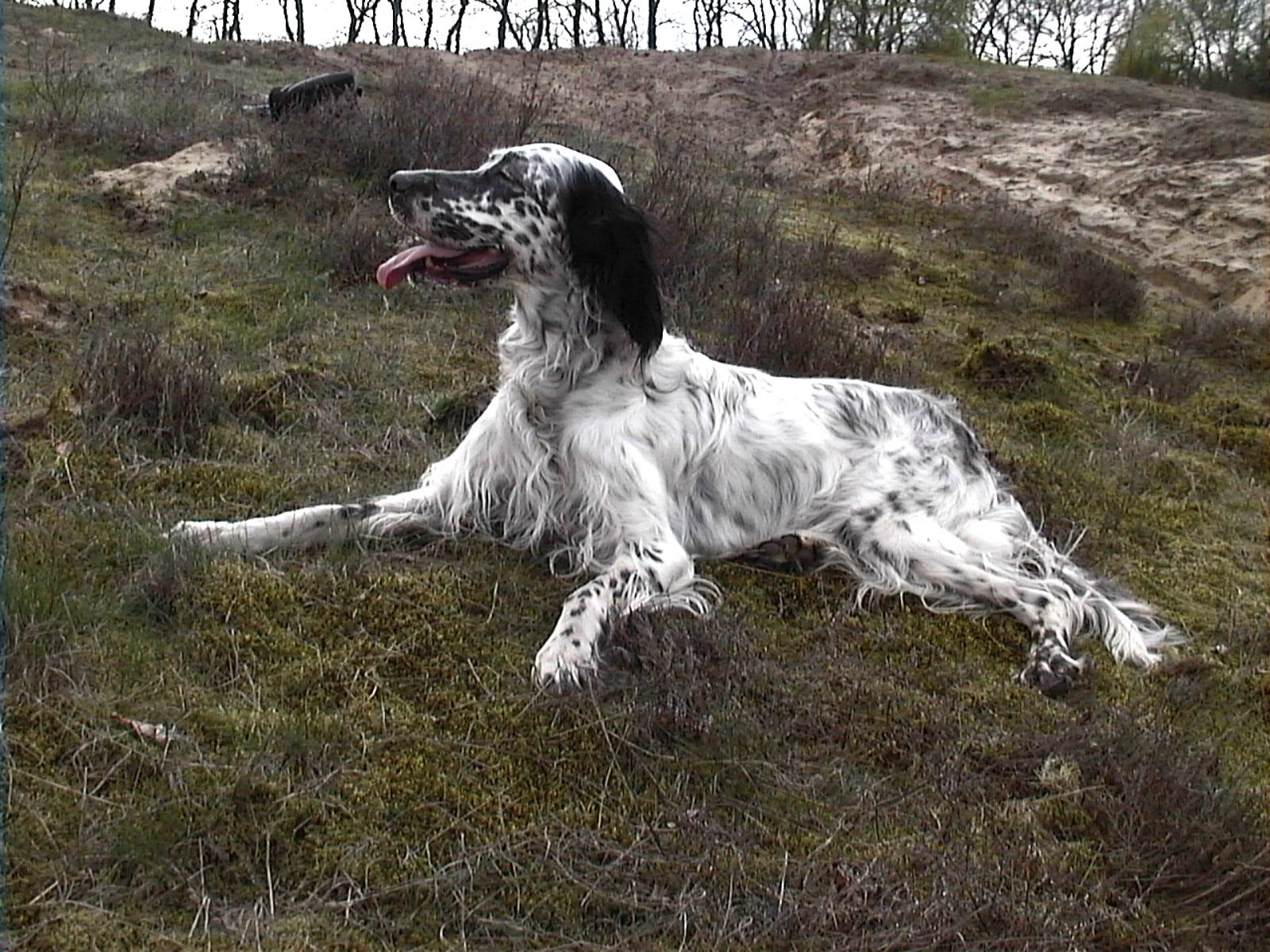
An eighteen month old female

When the American Kennel Club was established in 1878, English Setters, together with eight other sporting breeds, were accepted as the first pure-bred registrations by the club. The very first dog registered with the AKC and the holder of registration number one was an English Setter named "Adonis". He was born in 1875 and is recorded as sired by "Leicester" out of a bitch named "Dart". His colours were given as black, white and tan. He was owned by his breeder George E. Delano of New Bedford, MA.

English Setters were especially popular in the UK during the 1960s, 70s and 80s and registrations of puppies reached 1344 during 1974. In 2012, the Kennel Club listed the English Setter amongst the Vulnerable Native Breeds as only 234 puppies were registered. A decade earlier, in 2002, there were 568 English Setter puppies registered. However, during 2012 the number of English Setter puppies registered increased to 314, so the breed was moved to the Kennel Club's "At Watch" list, which is for breeds with registrations from 300 to 450. In 2015 registrations fell to 289 resulting in a return to the Vulnerable Native Breeds list for 2016. The breed is still fairly well represented in Italy, where it is popular as a working gun-dog. Even in Italy, however the breed is in sharp decline, going from 20,999 registrations in 2002, to 14510 registrations in 2011. In contrast, the American Kennel Club stated that 2011 was the "year of the setters, with all four making big jumps over the past year". English Setters had previously ranked at 101 in 2010 but moved up to 87 in 2011, a position the breed maintained in 2012. As of 2024 the ranking has dropped to 93rd.

== See also ==
- List of dog breeds
