= Irish Red and White Setter =

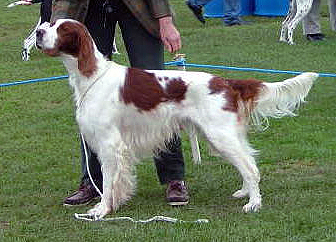
- Common nicknames: Irish R&W Setter; IRWS
- Origin: Ireland
Traits
Height	Males	24 to 26 inches (61 to 66 cm)
	Females	22.5 to 24 inches (57 to 61 cm)
- Weight: 50 to 70 lb (23 to 32 kg)
- Color: Red and White
Kennel club standards
- Irish Kennel Club: standard
- Fédération Cynologique Internationale: standard

The Irish Red and White Setter (Irish: An Sotar Rua agus Bán) is a breed of dog. As with all setters, it is classified as a gundog in the UK and is included in the sporting group in America and Canada. It is virtually identical in use and temperament to the related Irish Setter, as well as the Gordon and English setters, but is more often found as a working gun dog.

The original purpose of the breed was to hunt gamebirds. In the UK, their quarry can be partridge or grouse, pheasant, ptarmigan, blackgame, snipe or woodcock as all these birds try to avoid predators by hiding rather than flying away. Overseas, they may be used to hunt quail, willow grouse, sand grouse, guinea fowl, sagehen or francolin.

Despite the breed's early origins, it had almost become extinct at the end of the 19th century. During the 1920s, dedicated breeders managed to revive interest and restore the Irish Red and White setter to a viable position. It is still considered a vulnerable breed but has gained recognition from all major kennel clubs.

== Function ==
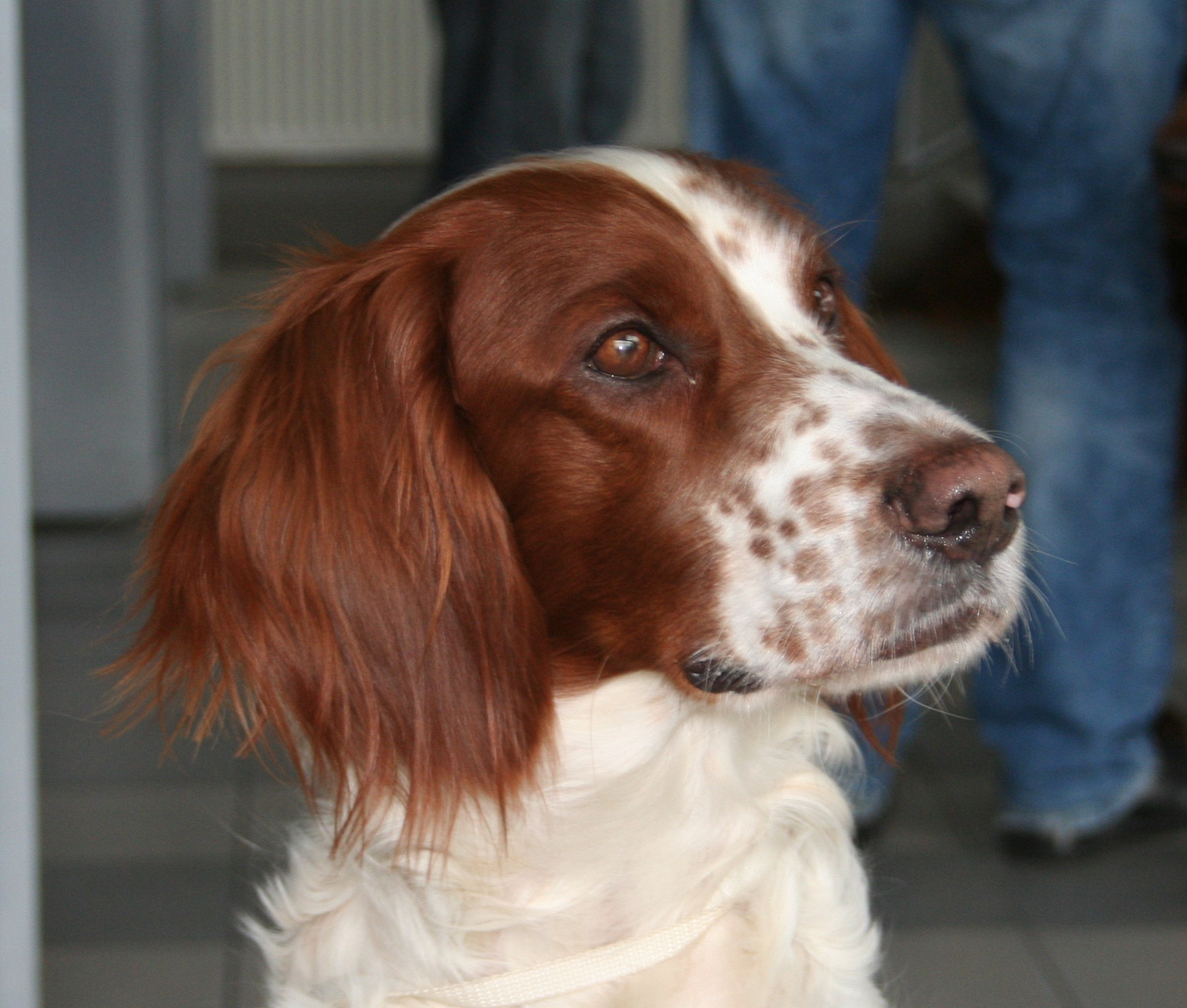

The function of setters is to find and locate game by quartering ground as it searches for the scent carried in the wind by birds such as grouse, partridge, pheasant or snipe. It is fast and wide-ranging. As it gallops in its quest to seek scent, its head is carried high. Once it locates the birds, it will freeze on point or "set" indicating to its handler where the birds are hiding. It may slightly crouch but its position will remain tense, immobile and rigid. The dog's head will remain raised as it savours the airborne scent and it intently stares in the direction of where the birds are hiding. Its tail will be held level with its back. The breed is classified in the Gundog Group by the Kennel Club in the U.K. and in the Sporting Group by the American and Canadian Kennel Clubs. The Fédération Cynologique Internationale (FCI) classify the breed in Group 7 (Pointing dogs), Section 2 (British and Irish Pointers and Setters).

The Irish Red and White Setter still has an ingrained natural working ability, so when correctly trained and given the appropriate opportunity, it will work well performing its original function.

They can take longer to train than other gun dogs, but once trained, they are loyal and reliable companions. They need firm and decisive, but not harsh, training.

== History ==
=== Origins ===
'Setting dogges' – an ancient term for setters, were developed to find game birds and would have been used in Roman times. The dog would find the location of the game birds by scenting the air, freeze in either a standing or crouching position, then slowly creep forward on command to disturb the birds into flight. Once the birds were in flight the hunter who had been following the dog would release hawks to capture the birds in the air. When netting superseded the use of hawks, setting dogs would still be used to indicate the whereabouts of the birds, but the hunter would come up behind the dog and throw a net over the birds. In the mid-1600s, guns became more readily available and shooting game birds became a popular pastime of the landed gentry. The basic work of setters was still to find and point to the location of game birds but it also had to be steady to shot.

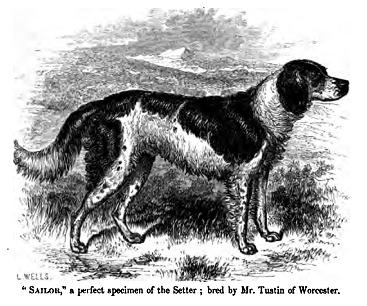
An early setter from around the 1850s.

By the 17th century 'setting dogges' had become established and the breeds as seen in the present day could be identified as Setters. Interbreeding of differently coloured dogs was still taking place during this period, but this gradually changed and sportsmen started to limit matings to dogs adapted to the terrain they were required to cover.

Originally, setters in Ireland were mostly red, or the parti-colour red and white, or even mostly white dogs. All were accepted as Irish Setters and were mated to each other.

As late as 1875 at a conformation show in Dublin, there were 66 entries in the Irish Setter classes; 23 of these entries were red and white. At a show in Cork the next year, out of 96 entries, there were 36 red and white animals. This was when the fashion for solid red-coloured setters began, leading to a decline in red and white setter numbers. The popularity of the solid red Irish Setter in both America and Ireland gained strength as they attracted very high prices, all adding to the demise of the Irish Red and White almost to the point of extinction. A handful of breeders in remote parts of Ireland kept the breed alive.

A small number of breeders were active from 1775 to the end of the 19th century. The Rossmore family of County Monaghan in Ireland, had a strain of red and white setters dating back to the mid 18th century and this line was preserved into the 20th century. The family still own many paintings of these dogs. During the breed's history, red and white setters were sometimes referred to as Rossmore Setters. Other owners recorded at this time included Reverend Mahon of Castlegar, Yelverton O'Keefe, Maurice Nugent O'Connor and Miss Lidwell whose name was sometimes misspelt as Ledwich. The dogs from these strains were all particularly known for their working abilities.

=== Revival ===
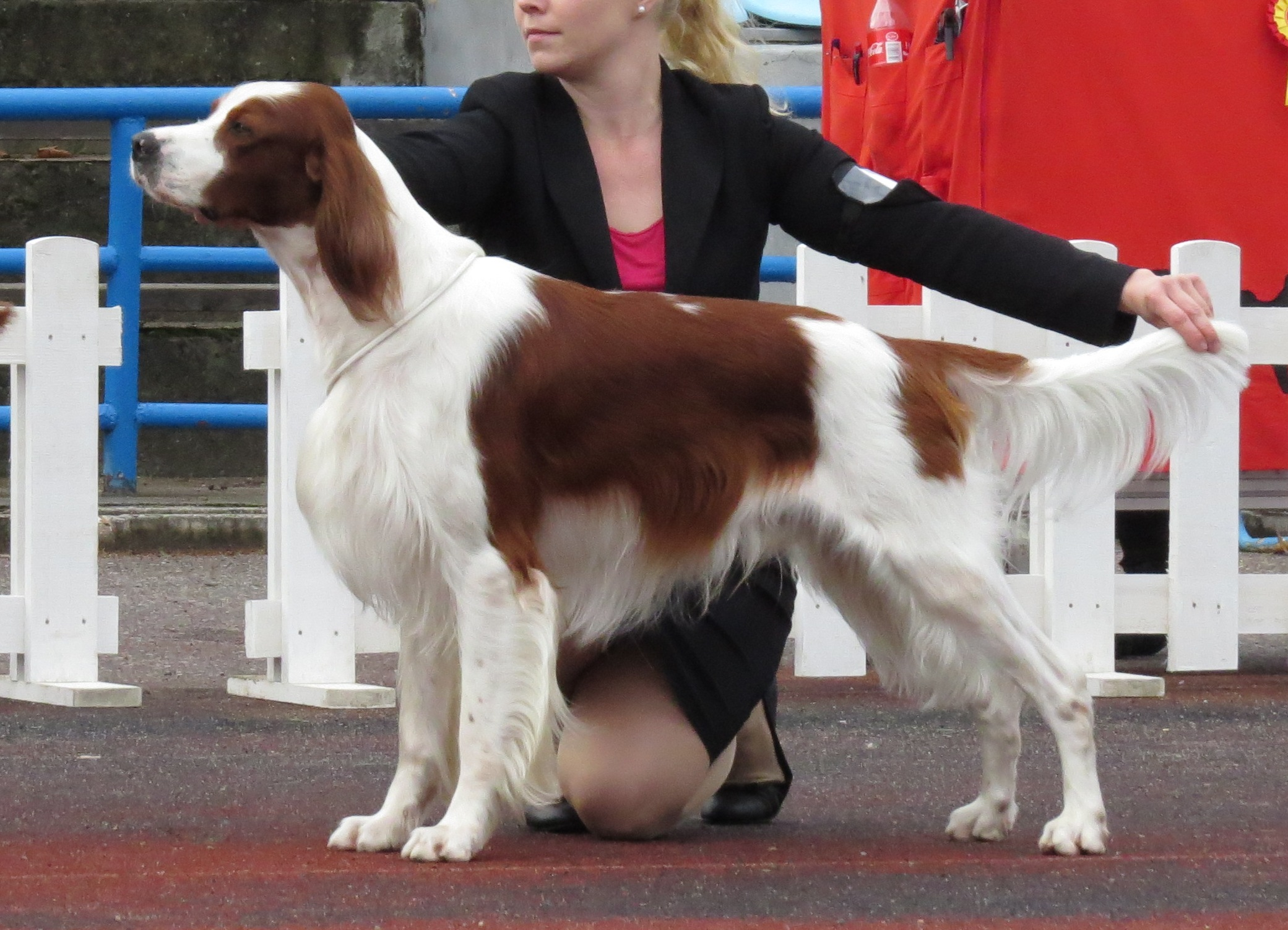
Irish Red And White Setter in Tallinn

Upon returning from the Great War, Irish clergyman Noble Huston attempted a revival of the breed, but despite this, numbers on the island of Ireland remained small. From around 1970, a revival of the breed was planned, and the numbers began to increase slowly. The Irish Kennel Club approached the Irish Red Setter Club during 1976 to ask if it was willing to help oversee the revival of the Irish Red and White Setter.

Partly through the endeavours of the Irish Red and White Setter Field & Show Society, which was formed in 1981, the breed became well established and received national and international recognition. Irish Red and White Setters successfully compete in conformation shows and field trials, attaining champions in both disciplines.

Many individuals contributed to the breed's successful revival. Rev. Huston kept a note of his litters in the parish register. He did not have official pedigrees but did engage in lengthy correspondence with Maureen Cuddy (then Clarke), whose kennel name was 'Knockalla". In a letter to Cuddy, Rev. Huston wrote: "...the present Red and Whites are not a new breed nor a revived breed (like the Irish Wolfhound) but a continued breed..." It was through Cuddy's meticulous record keeping and research that in 1974 the Irish Kennel Club finally accepted that the pedigrees of the few remaining Irish Red and Whites were accurate.

It is likely that the revived generations of Irish Red and White Setters descend from a puppy bitch Cuddy nursed to health in 1940. This bitch was named Judith Cunningham of Knockalla.

By the 1980s, Irish Red and White Setters were being imported into Great Britain, where the breed was developed more as a show dog. Interest in Great Britain had particularly been revived after Alan and Ann Gormley from Dublin exhibited an Irish Red and White at Crufts in 1980. This was Harlequin of Knockalla who was bred by Cuddy in 1977. Harlequin had qualified for Crufts due to his success at shows in Ireland, but the Gormleys were more interested in showing their dogs than in working them. Harlequin did prove he could work while young, but an error with the paperwork meant his qualifying test at a field trial was never correctly recorded. Harlequin was sired by Glenkeen Sandy whose grandfather was Sulhamstead Natty D'Or, a field trial dog bred by Florence Nagle.

The breed was little known in Britain and the Kennel Club had inadvertently listed Harlequin's Crufts entry among the Irish Setters. This was the trigger for great interest in the breed, as it proved the breed was not extinct as was believed.

Irish Red and White Setters bred by the Gormleys under their kennel name of 'Meudon' proved influential worldwide as their Red and Whites were exported to Italy, America and Holland, as well as to Great Britain.

In contrast to these British dogs, the breed has continued to be primarily a working and field trial dog in Ireland.

From 1 January 2009, the Irish Red and White Setter was fully recognised by the American Kennel Club (AKC), and was eligible to compete in conformation and all other competitive fields. The breed had previously been listed on the AKC Foundation Stock Service, which is the first step towards a purebred breed gaining recognition in America. The breed was given recognition by the Canadian Kennel Club in May 1999.

The breed is recognised by most other national Kennel Clubs. All registered Irish Red and White Setters are the descendants of the dogs accepted by the Irish Kennel Club at the time of the revival of the breed in the 1970s.

It is listed by the Kennel Club in the UK as a Vulnerable Native Breed, due to registration numbers of less than 300 per year.

== Description ==
=== Appearance ===
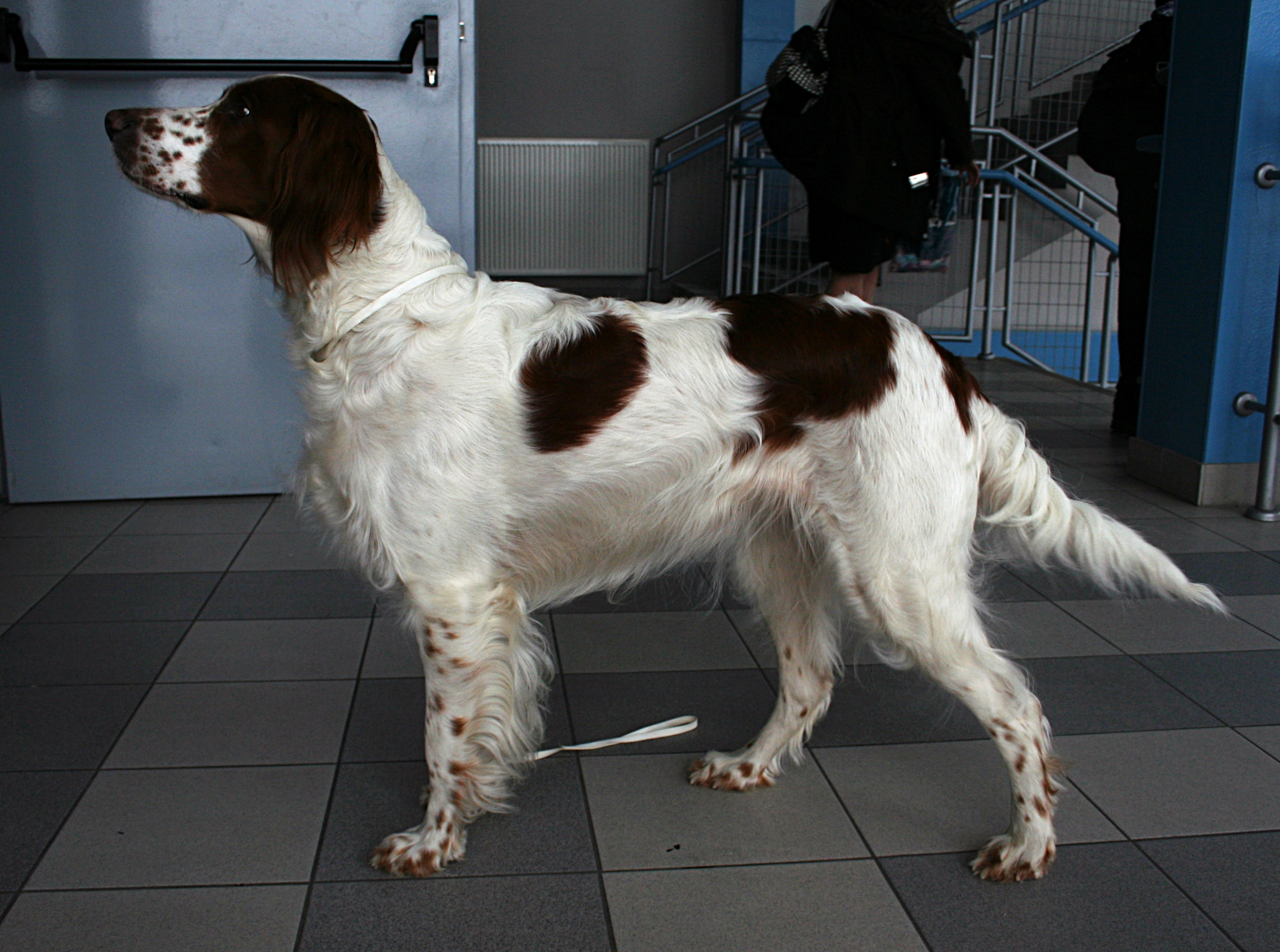
An Irish Red and White Setter showing the islands of colour in the coat.

The Irish Red and White Setter should have an aristocratic, well proportioned, balanced appearance yet still be strong and powerful without lumber or coarseness. It does not have the racy appearance of its solid red-coloured cousin, as the Red and White Setter is heavier in body, has a broader head and the peak at the back of his skull is less peaked. They are athletic, keen and intelligent.

The head and body coat is short and flat with long silky fringes – usually these fringes are called 'feathering'. The feathering forms a fringe on the outside of the ears, neck, chest, down the back of the front legs, under the belly and on the back legs. The tail is also feathered with long coat. The body coat and feathering should be straight and flat but not profuse and never curly.

There are subtle differences between each of the setter breeds. However, one of the main distinguishing features between the setter breeds is colour. As the breed name implies, Irish Red and White Setters must be red and white, and it is an important feature of the breed.

The base colour is a pearly white and there should be solid patches of deep-red. The red colour can be likened to a freshly opened chestnut and should not be light red or gingerish. The face, feet, front and lower hind legs are allowed some mottling or flecking but it must not extend to other areas of the body coat.

Irish Red and White Setters should be combed and well brushed each week to keep the coat well groomed. Any wispy hair on feet should be trimmed away regularly and bushy hair behind ears should be thinned. They should only need to be bathed when necessary as they are easy to keep clean due to the single coat not being too thick. Irish Red and White Setters do not require as much trimming for presentation in conformation shows as the other setters, because they have lighter coats.

The FCI give desired heights of 22.5 to 24 inches (57 to 61 cm) in females and 24.5 to 26 inches (62 to 66 cm) in males, with no stated weight restrictions, while the American KC states that females range in height from 22.5 to 24 inches (57 to 61 cm), and males from 24 to 26 inches (61 to 66 cm), with a weight around 50 to 70 lb (23 to 32 kg). No specific height or weight is given in the Kennel Club breed standard but males can be up to 27 inches (69 cm) and weigh around 70 lb (32 kg). The height is taken from where the dog's neck joins the back (the withers) measured down to the ground.

=== Temperament ===
The Irish Red and White Setter can devoted and affectionate dogs making them ideal all-round family dogs. They are intelligent and respond well to proper training but they need to have plenty to occupy them. They thrive best in active families, where they have outlets for their high energy, and require space to run freely. Young puppies do not require much exercise but once they reach maturity the breed's working instincts mean they require space to be able to run hard and fast for a long distance. Setters are good natured, gentle and get on well with children and other dogs.

== Health ==
=== Hereditary concerns ===
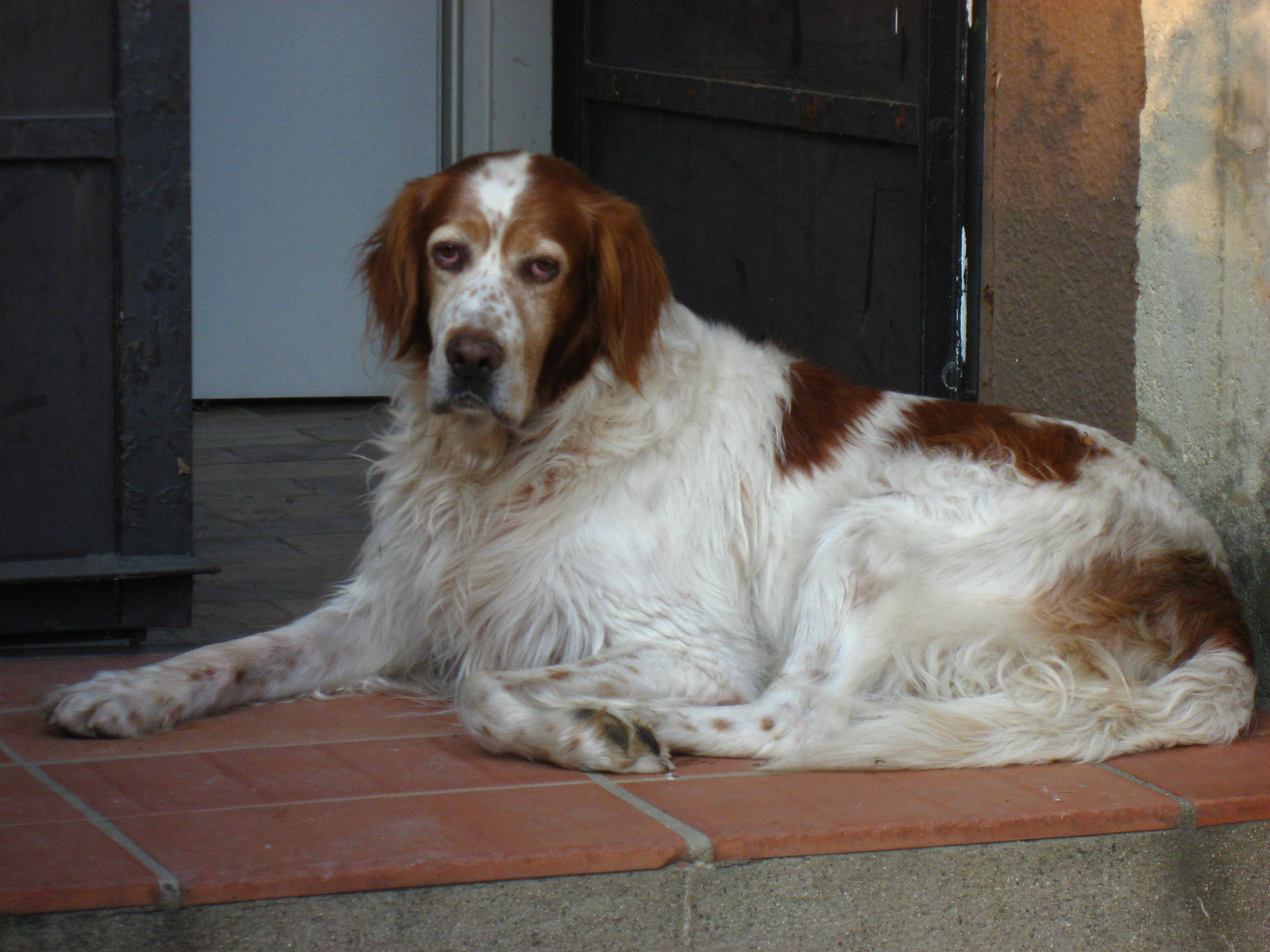
An elderly Irish Red and White Setter; the expected lifespan is 10–12 years.

Irish Red and White Setters are generally a healthy breed. However, there are three known diseases in the breed which are monitored by the breed clubs.

These are:

- Canine Leucocyte Adhesion Deficiency (CLAD) – a failure of the immune system to fight infection. Young puppies do not thrive and continually pick up infections. They can also have growth problems and may die well before they reach their first birthday. The Kennel Club has only registered Irish Red and White Setters that are proven clear of the CLAD mutation, either by direct DNA testing or by virtue of having parents that are proven to be clear of the CLAD mutation (i.e. hereditarily clear). No carriers can be registered. This ruling came into effect on 17 June 2008;
- von Willebrands Disease (vWD) – a failure of the blood to clot over a wound, which in extreme cases, the dog can bleed to death with only a small wound, if unattended. The Kennel Club will only register litters of Irish Red and White Setters if both parents are DNA tested clear of the von Willebrand Disease (vWD) mutation, or are hereditarily clear of this mutation. This ruling came into effect on 1 January 2011;
- and Posterior Polar Cataract (PPC) – sight is impaired by a cataract on the back of the lens of the eye.

Because of breeders' proactive approach, in the UK the number of affected dogs have been kept low and CLAD and vWD are "virtually unheard of in the breed today".

In 2004, the UK Kennel Club established the Accredited Breeders Scheme, which was later called the Assured Breeders scheme (ABS). The scheme received UKAS accreditation in April 2013. ABS members are required to adhere to additional criteria than those necessary for basic KC registration. Among the extra requirements is "Ensuring that the parents of each litter are readily identifiable by either Microchip, Tattoo or DNA profile." As at March 2013, breeders of Irish Red and White Setters who are members of the ABS must continue to use screening systems for eye testings and DNA checks for vWD and CLAD. It also advises screening for hip dysplasia.

Irish Red and White Setters have an average lifespan of 10 to 12 years.

=== Outcross programme ===
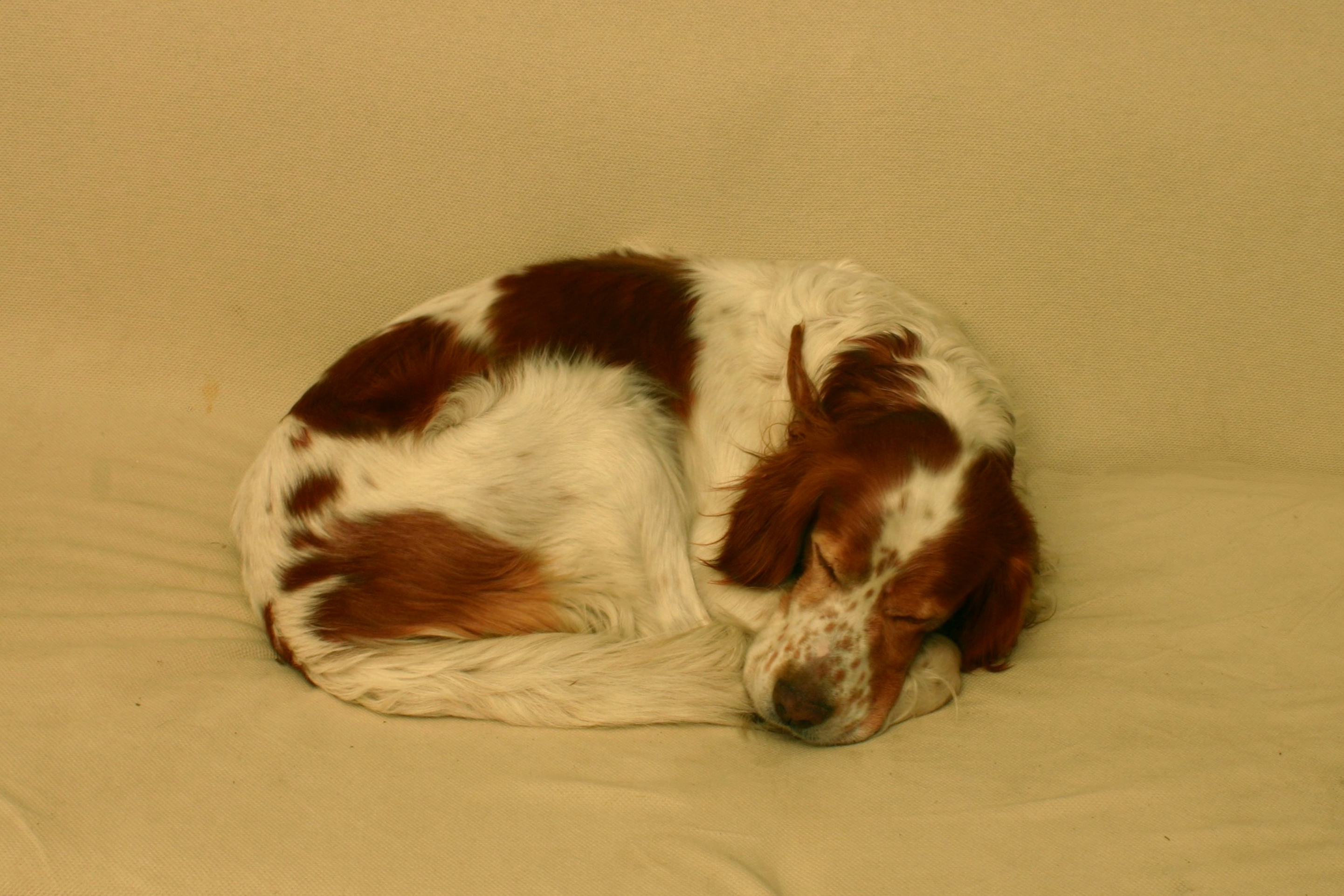
Sleeping Irish Red and White Setter

In an attempt to address the possibility of a very restricted gene pool, the Irish Kennel Club (IKC) announced in 2011 that it was to instigate a programme of allowing Irish Red and White Setters to be crossed with Irish Setters. Any such outcross matings were to be carefully monitored. The programme was supported by the Irish Red and White Setter Club of Ireland, the Irish Red Setter Club (Ireland) and other national Kennel Clubs. The IKC felt there was a high degree of inbreeding within ten generations of Irish Red and White setters and wished to increase the genetic diversity of the breed to prevent genetic problems arising from close inbreeding. It considered that the genes of the working lines of Irish Setters were very similar to those of the Irish Red and White setters and their close ancestry had already been used to aid the revival of the Irish Red and White setter. Before any outcross matings could take place, the mating would have to be approved by the official Outcross Committee. Only dogs with current health tests would be considered.

However, the programme was met with dismay by many other breed clubs worldwide who felt it was a flawed and disappointing decision. An official of the Canadian breed club said: "we cannot condone the crossbreeding of our essentially healthy IRWS breed with dogs of a breed which is known to hold, by various unknown modes of inheritance, far more genetic detritus than ours." The Irish Red and White Setter Club of GB felt the outcross was not desirable nor necessary. Despite such criticism, some breed clubs have chosen to take part in the programme.

== See also ==
- List of dog breeds
- Hunting dog
- Pointing breed
