= Count Noble =

Famous English Setter dog

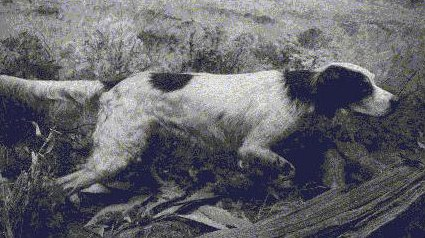
- Species: Domestic dog
- Breed: English Setter
- Sex: Dog
- Born: August 1, 1879; Sewickley, Pennsylvania
- Died: January 20, 1891 (aged 11)
- Resting place: The National Bird Dog Museum; Grand Junction, Tennessee
- Known for: Hunting dog and show dog
- Owner: Benjamin Frederick Wilson
- Parents: Count Windom (sire); Nora (dam)

Count Noble (August 1, 1879 – January 20, 1891) was an English Setter dog. He was so well known that when he died in 1891, The New York Times ran an obituary. He was popularly known as the "$10,000 hunting dog." He was described as a "national symbol of what was great in bird dogs."

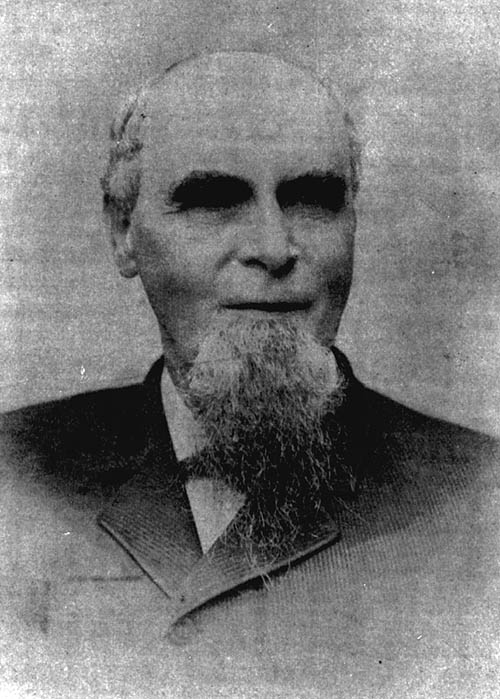
Benjamin Frederick Wilson, Count Noble's owner

His owner, Captain Benjamin Frederick Wilson, was a banker and coal barge operator. While he was well known for his hunting prowess and show skills, it was his prepotency, the ability to pass on his best traits to his progeny, that made him the most famous. In 1880, he won the national amateur Derby dog show. He was so famous that owners of other setters refused to compete in shows with him. Other shows offered special inducements in order to encourage his owner to compete.

Writing in 1904, Joseph A. Graham gives this description of Count Noble: "A large white-black-tan dog, long in the body and not considered a well proportioned setter. He weighed sixty pounds."

A portrait of Count Noble by Edmund Osthaus hangs in the first-floor reading room of the Duquesne Club.

Following his death, his preserved body was displayed in the Carnegie Museum of Natural History in a scene showing him hunting quail. The display was moved to The National Bird Dog Museum in Tennessee.

In 2011, American Kennel Club judge Richard LeBeau began an effort to raise $2,000 to establish a historical marker honoring Count Noble outside Osborne Elementary School, which stands on the site of Wilson's former home.
