= Setter =

Type of dog used to help hunt birds

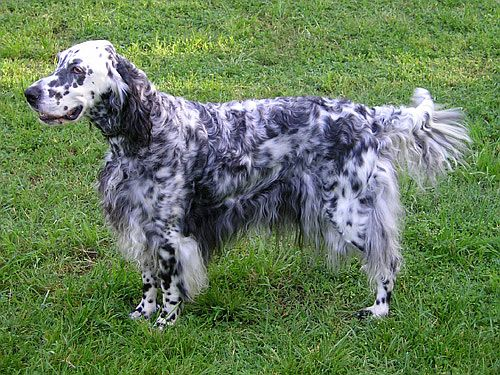
English Setter

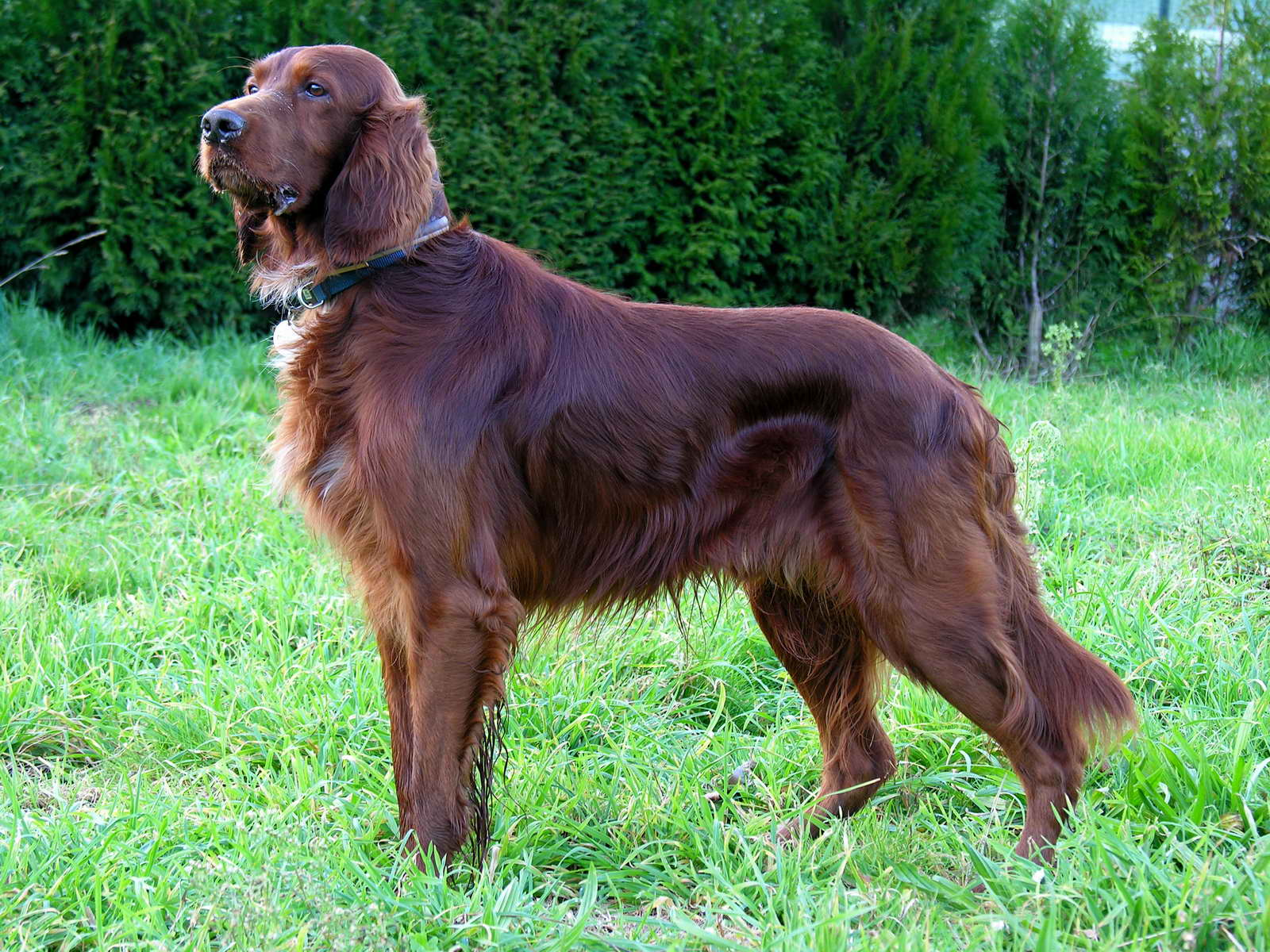
Irish Setter

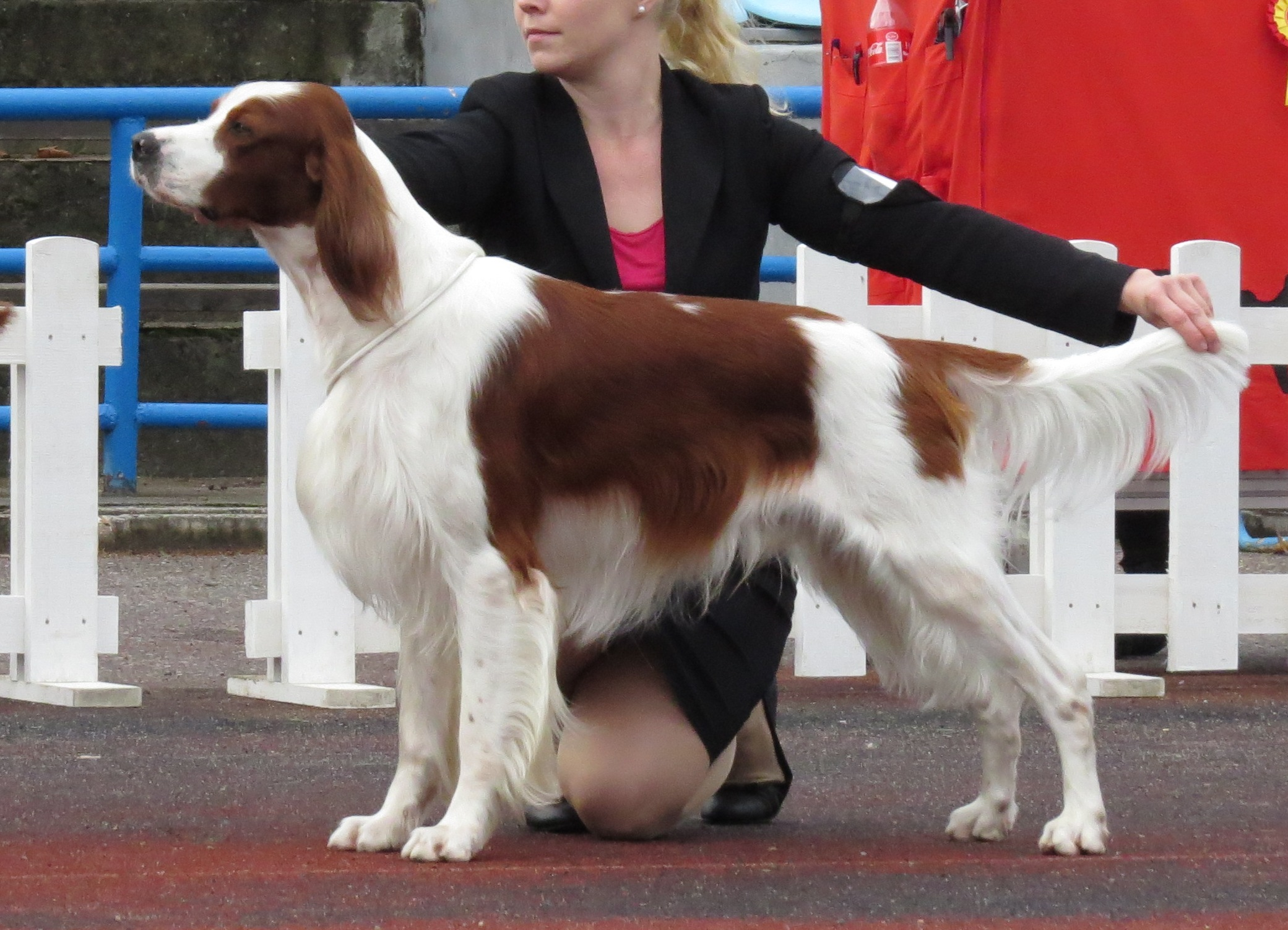
Irish Red and White Setter

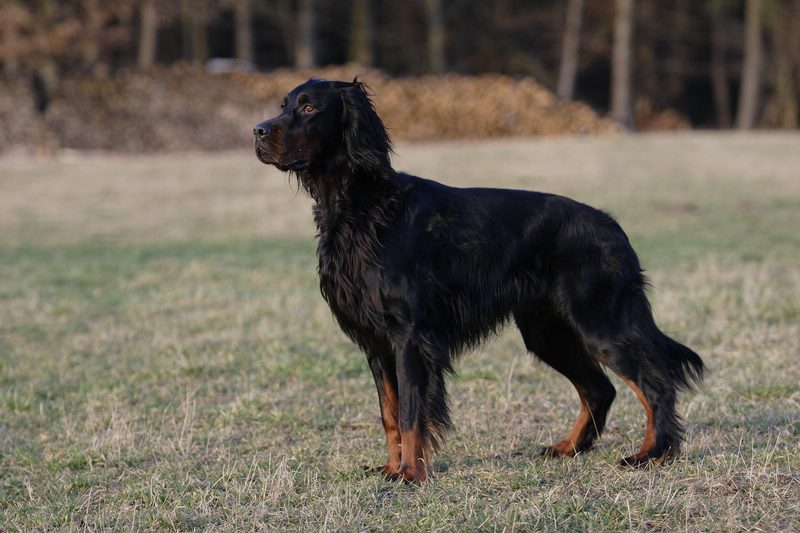
Gordon Setter

The setter is a type of gundog used most often for hunting game such as quail, pheasant, and grouse.

In the UK, the four setter breeds, together with the pointers, usually form a subgroup within the gundog group as they share a common function. However, the setter breeds each have subtle differences in head, bone and substance.

The American and Canadian Kennel Clubs classify these breeds within the Sporting Group. Setters from show lines are usually considered to be heavier and larger than those from 'working' lines.

== Function ==
A setter silently searches for game by scent; hunting is done systematically and methodically. The quarry is typically landfowl concealed from sight in tall grass or low shrubs. The setter pauses, "sets" (crouches) and may freeze in place pointing at the bird, or creep very slowly forwards. Hunters may use a single setter, or a group of 2-3 in order to more accurately triangulate the bird's position. Originally, a large net would be tossed over the vegetation to trap the bird(s). As firearms have become the more common bird hunting tool, hunters now usually flush the bird (startle it to flight) and shoot.

A setter does not follow the scent trail of a game bird the way a tracking scenthound hunts, but carries its head high sensing for air scent wafting directly from the bird. The hunter, therefore will take the setter to the lee side of the search area to begin, rather than to a trail the bird is likely to have passed through. Most setters are born with a natural proclivity to hunting. Dogs which show excitement and interest in birds are described as being "birdy", and trainers look for puppies that show this particular trait. Training is usually done with quail as a first choice or domesticated pigeons.

== Attributes ==
This group of dogs combines beauty, brains and bird sense; the early setter breeds are believed to have been developed as far back as the 15th century in the UK. The ancestors of modern setters probably originated in Spain and were bred from spaniel stock. Later, these dogs were exported to France and England where the breeds were developed into today's varieties.

They are fast, stylish game-finding dogs with a unique history and evolution for the single purpose of finding game birds. Writing in 1576 Dr Johannes Caius states "There is also at this date among us a new kind of dogge brought out of Fraunce, and they bee speckled all over with white and black, which mingled colours incline to a marble blewe". Argue speculates this may be a description of the blue belton colour found in English setters.

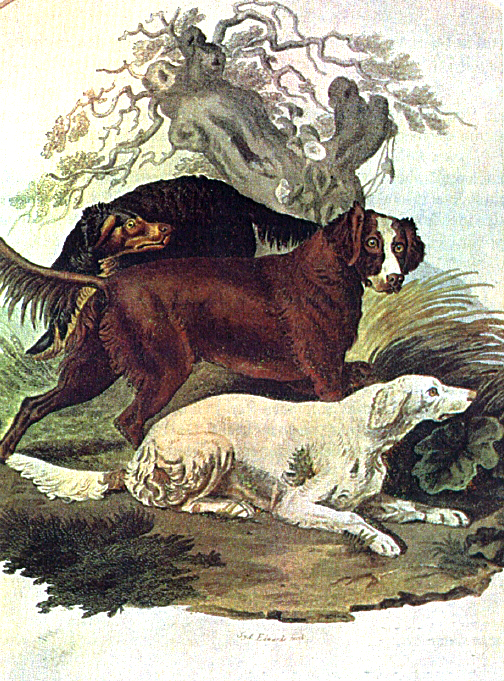
Early setters (Sydenham Edwards)

== Early shows and field trials ==
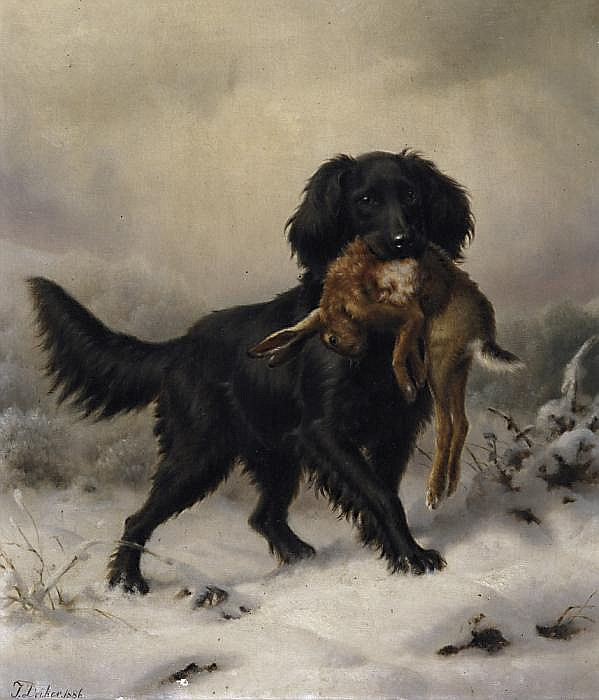
Dark setter with hare

The first official dog show held in the UK was at Newcastle-on-Tyne in June 1859 and entry was restricted to setters and pointers. There were 36 setters and 23 pointers entered. The show was organised by John Shorthose and William Pape. Mr Jobling's Black and Tan Setter, Dandy, won the first prize for setters. The class for pointers was judged by Mr Jobling who awarded the prize to a pointer owned by a Mr Brailsford, who helped judge the setters. This raised some criticism.

The prize awarded to each winner was a double barrelled gun worth around £15 to £20.

There was uncertainty as to how setters would be classified at early shows. Three classes were usually scheduled in 1862 dividing setters into three categories: English, Black/Tan and Irish. These became official breed classifications when The Kennel Club was founded in 1873.

During 1806 in the UK there was a sale of setters. A black setter bitch called Peg was sold for 41 guineas while the price for setter dogs called Punch, Brush, Bob, Bell, Bounce and Sam varied from 17 to 32 guineas each. No colours were specified for the dogs.

The first recorded field trial in the UK was held in April 1865 on the estate of Samuel Whitbread (MP) at Southill, Bedfordshire. It was only open to setters and pointers. All the setters entered were black and tans (Gordons).

In 1879, the Western Hemisphere held its first recorded show. This was also restricted to setters and pointers. It was four years after this that the first American Field trial was held.

== More recent competitions ==
The Kennel Club has four champion titles available to be achieved by setters competing in the UK. These are:

- Show Champion (Sh Ch), awarded to dogs who have won three Challenge Certificates (CCs) under three different judges with at least one CC won after 12 months of age
- Champion (Ch), gained by dogs which have won a Sh Ch title plus a field trial award, Diploma of Merit or a Show Gundog Working Certificate
- Field Trial Champion (Ft Ch), dogs which won a pointer or setter open stake or two first prizes at two different stakes under two different A Panel judges; there must be no less than 16 runners entered.
- Dual Champion, the highest award available to setters, a dog which has achieved the titles of Show Champion and Field Trial Champion.

Challenge Certificates were first introduced by the Kennel Club in December 1900. Prior to 1958, a gundog could not claim to be a champion no matter how many CCs it won until it had gained a qualifier in the field as well. When the Show Champion title was instigated in 1958, it was agreed this could be applied retroactively.

The first ever gundog to attain the title was an English Setter. Since the Second World War only two dogs have achieved Dual Champion status in the UK. The first was a Pointer and the second was a Gordon Setter, the only Gordon to ever achieve this accolade.

Setters have been Best in Show at Crufts seven times. The award was secured by Irish Setters in 1981, 1993, 1995 and 1999. English Setters were best in show in 1964, 1977 and 1988. The Irish Setter Best in Show of 1981 was already a Field Trial Champion, proving that she had brains as well as beauty.

At the Westminster show in America an English Setter won the Best in Show title in 1938. He was only 11 months old and at his very first show. This was before entry to the show was restricted to Champions in 1992. He is the only setter to achieve Best in Show at Westminster.

== Registrations ==
In January 2006, the Kennel Club identified a number of British native breeds registering 300 or fewer puppies each year; it labelled these breeds as 'Vulnerable Native Breeds'. Initially, the list included the Irish Red and White Setter and the Gordon Setter but Gordons were re-classified as viable in January 2007 after consultation with the breed clubs. English Setters were added for the first time in 2012.

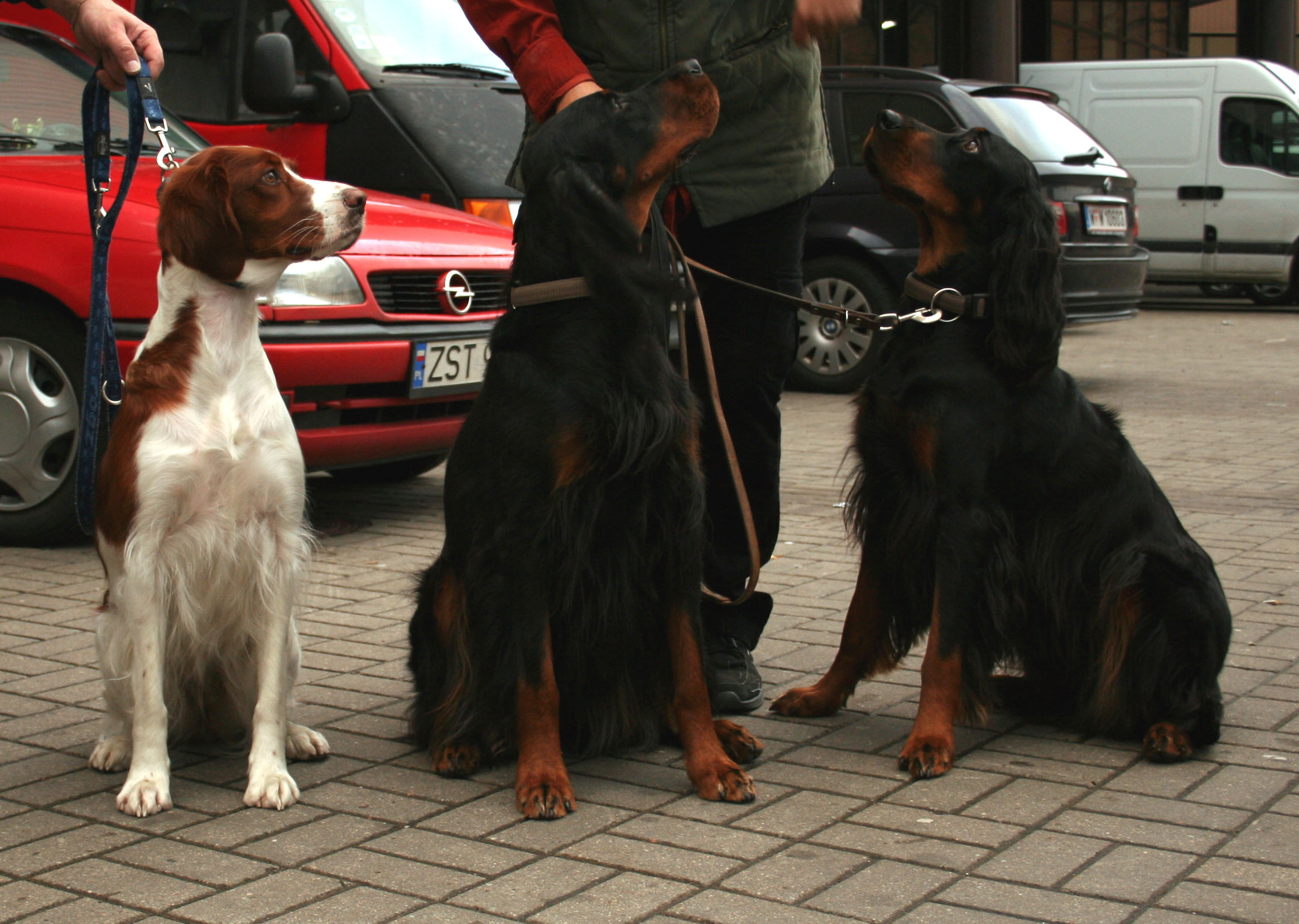
Gordon Setters pictured with an Irish Red and White Setter

To give an indication of how the UK registrations have changed, English Setter registrations were 568 in 2002, Gordons were 250 and Irish Red and Whites were 99, but Irish registrations totalled 1,225. However, by 2011 the figures for English Setters dropped to 234 puppy registrations; Gordons had a slight increase to 306; Irish Red and Whites had a slight drop to 83; and Irish decreased to 869 puppy registrations.

In contrast, in a comment about registration figures and popular breed rankings, the American Kennel Club stated that 2011 was the "year of the setters, with all four making big jumps over the past year". English Setters had ranked at 101 in 2010 but moved up to 87 in 2011; Irish had shifted from ranking at 77 in 2010 to 70 in 2011; Irish Red and Whites went up three places having been 150 in 2010 and 147 in 2011; and Gordons improved its 2010 position of 98 to be ranked at 94.

On January 1, 2009, the Irish Red and White Setter became eligible for American Kennel Club registration and was thereafter able to compete in the Sporting Group at its shows.

== Coat ==
Most setter breeds have long smooth, silky coats that require maintenance. While Gordon, Irish and English Setters usually undergo some trimming for presentation in the show ring, Irish Red and White Setters do not require as much work, because they have lighter coats.

== Temperament ==
Setters have a tendency to be happy, playful dogs and are usually very friendly both to people and other dogs. They have a great deal of energy and require daily exercise.

== Setter breeds ==
The breeds making up this subgroup are:

- English Setter
- Gordon Setter
- Irish Setter (a.k.a. Irish Red Setter)
- Irish Red and White Setter
