= Noble Huston =

Irish minister and dog breeder

- Born: William Benjamin Noble Huston; 1868; Ireland
- Died: 4 August 1944 (aged 75–76); Ballynahinch, County Down
- Known for: saving the Irish Red and White Setter from extinction

The Reverend William Benjamin Noble Huston (1868-4 August 1944), was the minister of the First Presbyterian Church in Ballynahinch, County Down and a breeder of dogs, credited with saving the Irish Red and White Setter from extinction in the early the twentieth century.

== Life ==
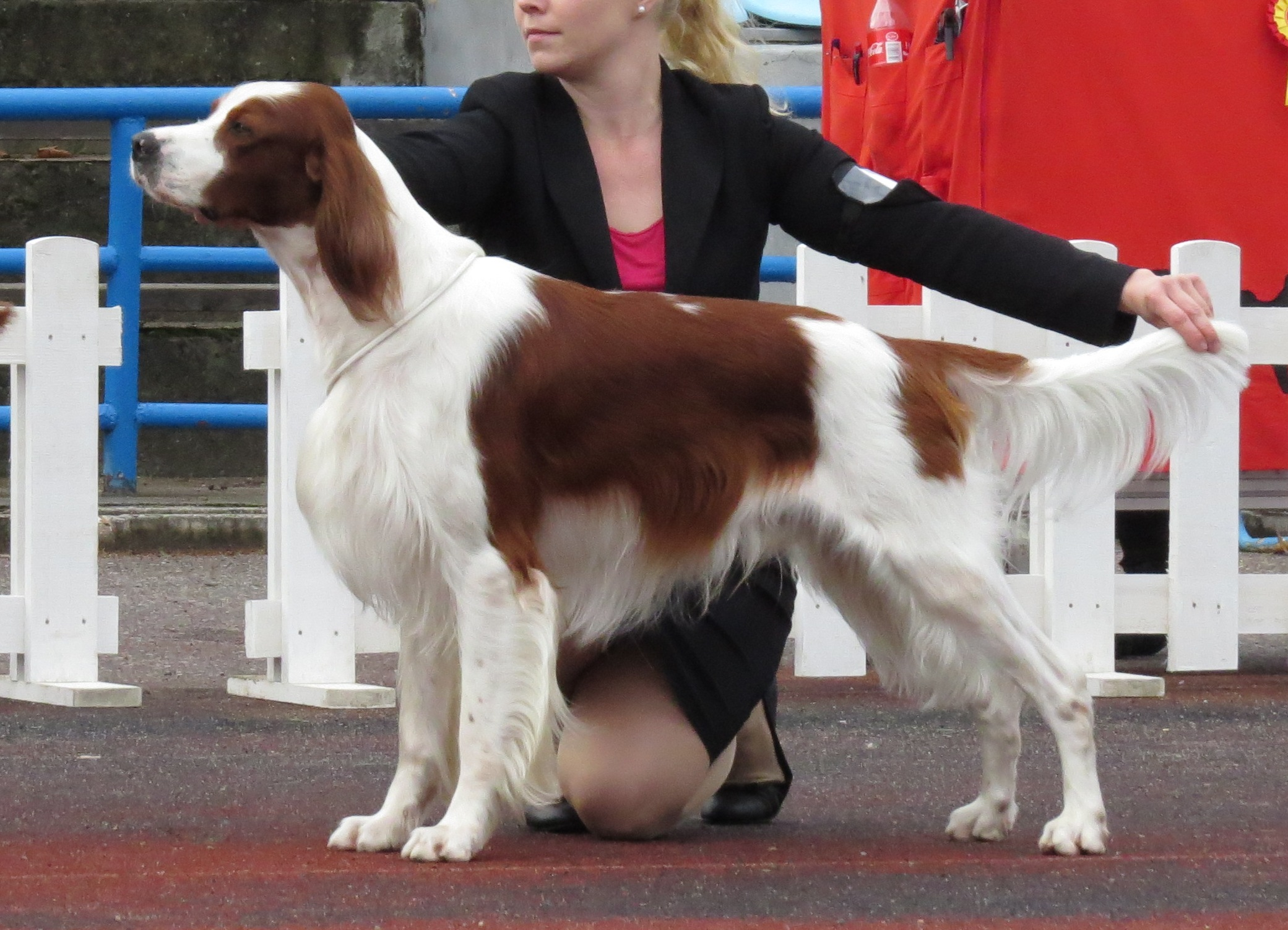
Irish Red And White Setter

Huston served as an army chaplain during WWI, and when he returned to Ireland he noted the effect the war had on dog breeding. This motivated him to start breeding the Irish Red and White Setter in the 1920s along with Dr Elliot and Maureen Cuddy.

According to Anna Redlich in "The Dogs of Ireland" (Dundalgan Press 1949), he "mated his half red and half red and white bitch Gyp to Johnnie, and later on to Glen of Rossmore ... Thus in due time and by judicious selection, he managed to build up a kennel of Red and White Setters..."

Huston and his wife, Jessie, had five children. Their son, John Clarke, was a pilot during WWII who died during circuit practice in 1942.

Huston is noted for also keeping bees. When the Catholic church burnt down in Ballynahinch, Huston offered the Presbyterian Church to the Catholic congregation for mass despite protests against this. He was minister in Ballynahinch for 37 years, and Huston Hall the town is named for him.
