= Deaf animal =

Animal with hearing difficulty

Some strains of animals, such as white cats, have a tendency to congenital deafness. Some known chemicals and elements can also affect deafness in animals.

Deafness can occur in almost any breed of cat or dog. This includes both pure-breed and mixed-breed animals, although there may be more prevalence in some specific breeds.

"The association between patterns of pigmentation and deafness in the dog has a long-documented history, with reports dating back over one hundred years. Long suspected of having a genetic basis, the search for loci with a pronounced influence in the expression of hearing loss in the dog has yet to be successful."

Deafness in animals can occur as either unilateral (one ear affected) or bilateral (both ears affected). This occurrence of either type of deafness seems to be relatively the same in both mixed-breed animals and pure-breed animals.

Research has found a significant association between deafness in dogs and the pigment genes piebald and merle. Although merle dogs seem to have higher occurrences of both deafnesses than some other breeds, this research also showed that they had lower occurrences than others. So still there is more to be known about the causes of deafness in animals such as dogs.

Common misconceptions may lead potential owners to believe that deaf dogs may be more likely to have an unpleasant disposition, or that the condition implies other brain abnormalities. Many people have successfully raised and trained deaf animals. Teaching a deaf dog may present unusual challenges, but inventiveness can overcome many of them. For example, when on a walk with a deaf dog, a laser pointer could be used to attract the animal's attention.

== See also ==
- Congenital sensorineural deafness in cats
- Deafness in humans
- Mechanosensation
