= Field trial =

Competitive event for dogs

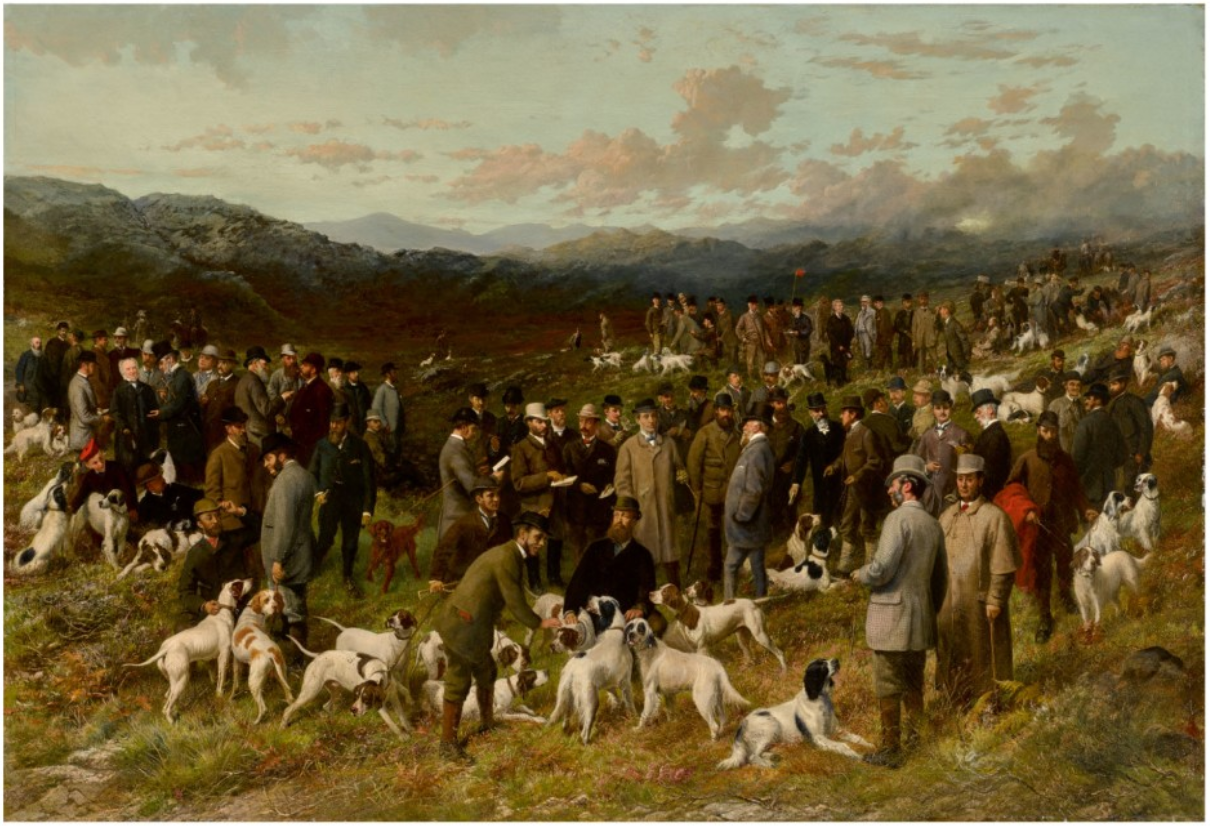
A field trial meeting at Bala, North Wales by George Earl

A field trial is a competitive event for gun dogs. Field trials are conducted for pointing dogs and setters, retrievers and spaniels, with each assessing the different types various working traits. In the United States, field trials are also conducted for basset hounds, beagles, and dachshunds.

== Pointer and setter trials ==
Pointer and setter trials are trials for both pointing dogs and setters. During pointer and setter trials the dogs are run in a brace (pair of dogs run together) with two judges observing, the dogs are worked into the wind on live gamebirds, they are required to quarter their assigned beat, finding and pointing any game in the beat. Once on the point the dog must remain staunch until the judge indicates then move in and flush the bird, once the bird is flushed a shot is fired and dog must drop to the ground. Dogs are judged for their ability to find game, their style and staunchness on point, their backing of the other dog, their quartering ability and their pace, eliminating faults include flushing the game early, chasing the game, running out of control or giving tongue (barking).

In the United States, dog handlers, judges and observers at American Kennel Club run pointer and setter trials often follow on horseback. Handlers, judges and observers at United Kennel Club trails are all on foot.

The first pointer and setter field trial was conducted in Bedfordshire in 1865.

=== HPR trials ===
HPR trials are trials for hunt, point, retrieve or "versatile" pointer breeds, in these trials the dog is expected to find and point game as in a pointer and setter trial, but after the game is shot they are also expected to retrieve the shot game. HPR trials are usually conducted on varying terrain to test the dogs in different environments, and they usually include at least one retrieve from water.

== Spaniel trials ==
A spaniel field trial

Spaniel trials are designed to replicate the rough shoot that is typically undertaken by spaniels, where the spaniel quarters the ground in front of its handler flushing game and afterwards retrieving it. Usually two dogs are trialled simultaneously with a judge walking in line approximately 40 yards (37 m) apart judging each dog, the dogs are expected to work independently with the judges watching the dog's manner whilst quartering, courage in cover and game finding ability. It is desirable for both winged and ground game to be available during spaniel trials, once the game is shot the judge gives approval and the spaniel is expected to retrieve the game to hand. Once all of the dogs have run the course, if the judges cannot agree on a winner a runoff is conducted where three or four dogs are run simultaneously so the judges can make a determination.

The first spaniel field trial was conducted in Britain in 1899.

== Retriever trials ==
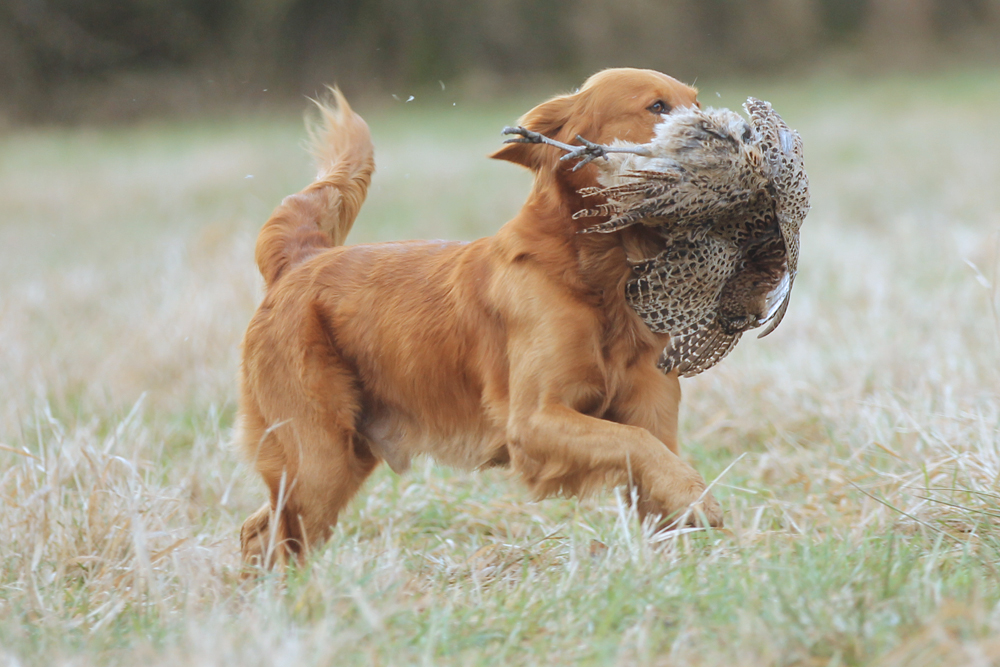
Golden Retriever retrieves a game bird at a retriever trial

Retriever trials are designed to replicate the work of a retriever; whereas working retrievers used by sportsmen often hunt for game and retrieve, retriever trials only focus on the conduct of the retrieve. In the United Kingdom retriever trails are conducted in a similar manner to driven shoots, where retrievers are used to collect shot game either whilst walking in line or waiting at the pegs. Usually six dogs are trialled together in a line with three judges each judging a pair of dogs but alternating the dogs down the line so every dog is observed by each judge. Dogs are judged on their style, marking, ability to take directions and retrieving to hand, no dog is permitted to retrieve game without the judge's consent, when not retrieving dogs are expected to remain quietly by their handlers side watching the other dogs work.

In the United States dogs are usually trialled individually and they are assessed equally retrieving from land and from water, with both marked retrieves and blind retrieves. Marked retrieves are where the dog observes the fall of the bird, blind retrieves are when the dog is sent to retrieve an unobserved bird by command.

Andy Bear was a three-time State Champion (1991, 1992, 1996).

== Basset, Beagle and Dachshund field trials ==
In the United States trials of Basset Hounds, Beagles and Dachshunds are also conducted, also called field trials the different breeds of hound compete whilst tracking a rabbit or a hare.

=== Basset trials ===
Sponsored by the American Kennel Club, Basset trials are conducted in either braces (pairs of hounds), small packs of seven hounds or large packs of 25 hounds, tracking a live rabbit or hare. There is also a gundog brace competition where a brace of Bassets are cast to locate a rabbit which is then shot at with a blank cartridge.

=== Beagle trials ===
Beagle trials sponsored by the American Kennel Club are run in the same brace, small pack, large pack and gundog brace events as Basset trials. United Kennel Club sponsored Beagle trials are conducted in two forms; in the first four beagles and their handlers each try to out-perform each other in locating game, in the second five hounds are worked together following a scent trail with the judge comparing their individual performances.

=== Dachshund trials ===
Sponsored by the American Kennel Club, Dachshund trials are conducted in braces in the same manner as Basset or Beagle brace trials.

== Field and hunt tests ==
Field tests and hunt tests are non-competitive activities designed to test a gundog's natural hunting abilities in a field environment without the added pressure of competition. Unlike in field trials where dogs compete against each other, in hunt tests dogs compete to pass the requirements of the tests. In the United Kingdom they are called field tests and are most frequently run by gun clubs or local field sports organisations. In the United States they are called hunt tests and are more formally organised, being run by both the American Kennel Club and United Kennel Club, with separate tests for pointing dogs, retrievers, and spaniels.
