= Hexham wolf =

Escaped wolf in Northumberland, England

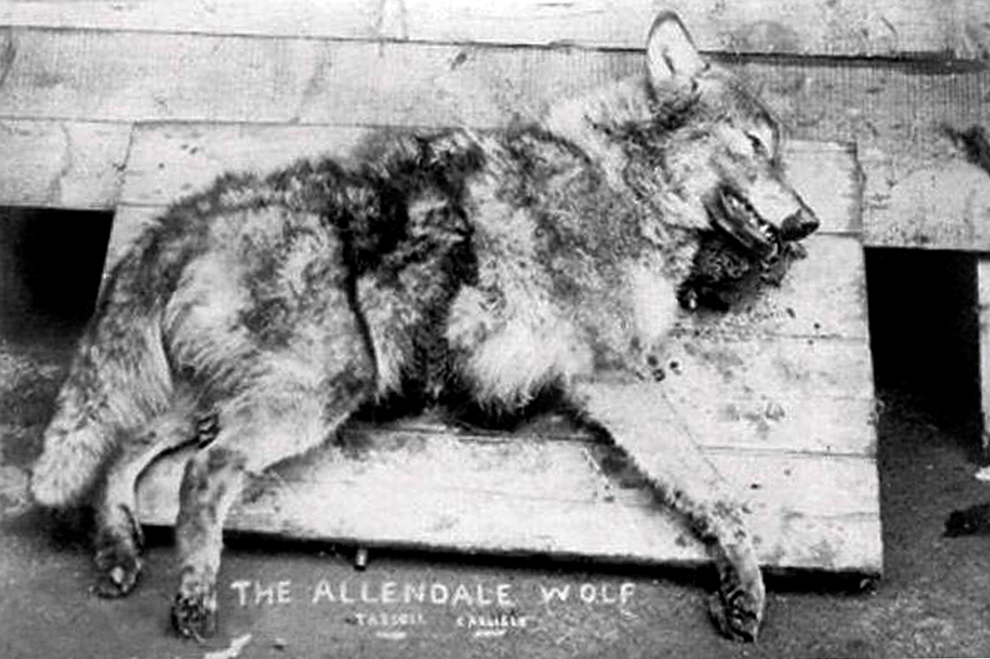
- Other name: The Wolf of Allendale
- Species: Grey wolf
- Sex: Male
- Years active: 1904–1905
- Known for: Killing livestock, howling
- Owner: Captain Bain of Shotley Bridge (suspected)
- Appearance: Either black and tan or dun, large
- Named after: The town near where he killed livestock

The Hexham wolf (also called the Allendale wolf or the Wolf of Allendale) was a grey wolf that escaped from a zoo and killed livestock in Hexham and Allendale, Northumberland during the winter of 1904. Conflicting reports label it as being either "black and tan" or "dun", although it was largely reported as being large and male.

On December 10th 1904, the Hexham Courant ran a story with the title "Wolf at Large in Allendale", reporting that over the past two to three weeks livestock loss in Hexham and Allendale had become so severe that some farmers were now housing animals in the night. Though it was suspected that the livestock killer was an escaped wolf belonging to Captain Bain of Shotley Bridge, that wolf was too young to pose a threat, and a much larger wolf was spotted by Allenheads school. On 9 December 1904, a grey wolf that had just committed a "great slaughter of a flock of sheep" was tracked for miles but escaped; the next day, he returned to his kill, and a new search party went out to no avail.

The public of Northumberland began, then, to get anxious; sheep were kept inside at night and lights were lit all night; rewards were offered to whoever could kill the wolf. A large meeting of farmers from the area was held on 20 December, chaired by the local MP Maj. Wentworth Henry Canning Beaumont and £5 reward was offered for the wolf's skin. Subsequently, the Hexham Wolf Committee was set up to help find the wolf. On 29 December 1904, some platelayers found the carcass of an animal cut in two by a passing train and thrown a distance of 40 yards. They buried the animal, but later after discussing it with the Stationmaster at Cumwhinton, dug it up again and bought it back to the station where a member of the Hexham Wolf Committee identified it as a full-grown grey male wolf. Captain Bain declared the wolf too old to be his and it was proclaimed on 7 January 1905 that the wolf found was not the Hexham wolf, who was still at large. By the end of January 1905, interest was waning in stories of the Hexham wolf, newspapers pushing it further back until it disappeared altogether.

When the Hexham Heads were discovered in 1971, the werewolf sightings that resulted were thought to be the Hexham wolf.

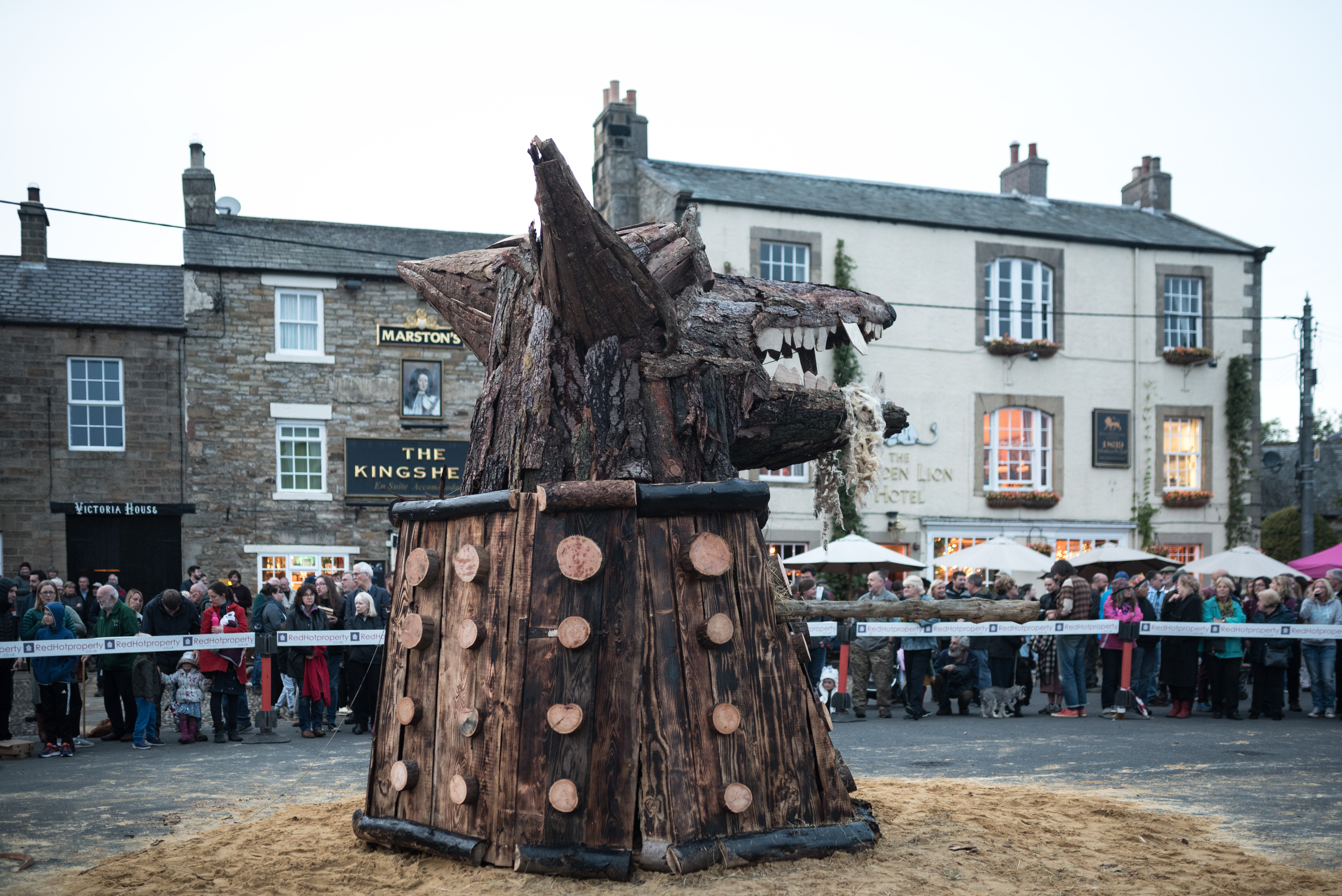
Allendale Wolf in Dalek's clothing

In 2014 the Allen Valleys Folk Festival was started and this features the burning of a wooden sculpture of the "Allendale Wolf". One year the wolf gained Dalek features after a campaign to support the Museum of Classic Sci-Fi who were being threatened by the planning authorities.

== See also ==
- Hexham Heads
- List of wolves
