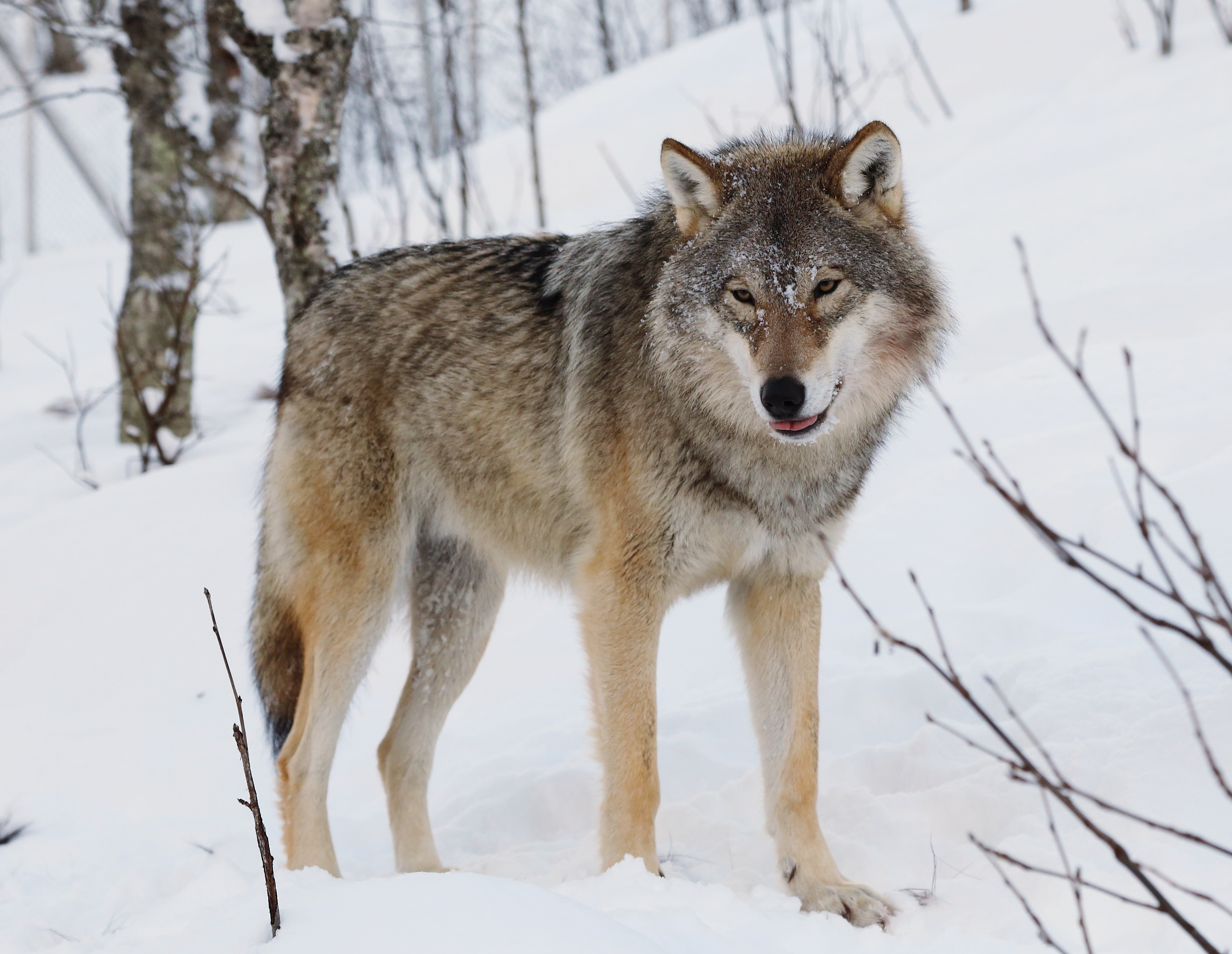
- Eurasian wolf (Canis lupus lupus) at Polar Park in Bardu, Norway

Conservation status
- Least Concern (IUCN 3.1)
- CITES Appendix II (Note: Populations of Bhutan, India, Nepal, and Pakistan are included in Appendix I. Excludes domesticated form and dingo, which are referenced as Canus lupus familiaris and Canus lupus dingo.)

Scientific classification
- Kingdom: Animalia
- Phylum: Chordata
- Class: Mammalia
- Order: Carnivora
- Family: Canidae
- Genus: Canis
- Species: C. lupus

Binomial name
- Canis lupus Linnaeus, 1758

Subspecies
- See Subspecies of Canis lupus
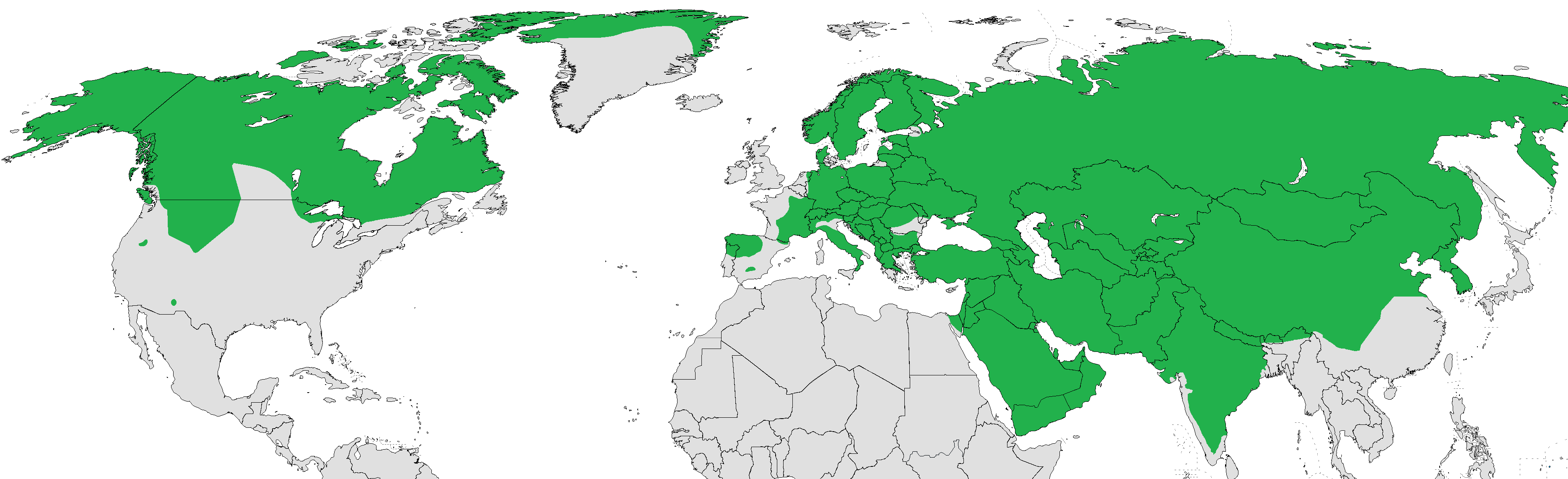
- Global wolf range based on IUCN's 2023 assessment.

= Wolf =

Wolf Temporal range: Middle Pleistocene – present (400,000–0 YBP)

Species of canine

The wolf (Canis lupus; (Note: Domestic and feral dogs are included in the phylogenetic but not colloquial definition of 'wolf', and are thus not in the scope of this article.) pl.: wolves), also known as the grey wolf or gray wolf, is a canine native to Eurasia and North America. More than thirty subspecies of Canis lupus have been recognized, including the dog and dingo, though grey wolves, as popularly understood, include only naturally occurring wild subspecies. The wolf is the largest wild extant member of the family Canidae, and is related closely enough to smaller Canis species, such as the coyote and the golden jackal, to produce fertile hybrids with them. The wolf's fur is usually mottled white, brown, grey, and black, although subspecies in the Arctic region may be nearly all white.

Of all members of the genus Canis, the wolf is most specialized for cooperative game hunting, as demonstrated by its physical adaptations to tackling large prey, its more social nature, and its highly advanced expressive behaviour, including individual or group howling. It travels in nuclear families, consisting of a mated pair accompanied by their offspring. Offspring may leave to form their own packs at the onset of sexual maturity and in response to competition for food within the pack. Wolves are also territorial, and fights over territory are among the principal causes of mortality. A carnivore, the wolf is an apex predator that feeds on large wild hooved mammals as well as smaller animals, livestock, carrion, and garbage. Single wolves or mated pairs typically have higher success rates in hunting than do large packs. Pathogens and parasites, notably the rabies virus, may infect wolves.

The global wild grey wolf population is estimated to be 300,000 and has been assessed as Least Concern by the International Union for Conservation of Nature (IUCN). Wolves have a long history of interactions with humans, having been despised and hunted in most pastoral communities because of their attacks on livestock, while conversely being respected in some agrarian and hunter-gatherer societies. Although the fear of wolves exists in many human societies, the majority of recorded attacks on people have been attributed to animals suffering from rabies. Wolf attacks on humans are rare because wolves are relatively few, live away from people, and have developed a fear of humans because of their experiences with hunters, farmers, ranchers, and shepherds.

== Etymology ==
The English "wolf" stems from the Old English wulf, which is itself derived from the Proto-Germanic *wulfaz. Both the English and Latin word for the animal lupus (from Proto-Italic *lúkʷos) trace back to the Proto-Indo-European root *wĺ̥kʷos. The name "grey wolf" refers to the greyish colour of the species.

Since pre-Christian times, the names of Germanic peoples such as the Anglo-Saxons used wulf as a prefix or suffix. Examples include Wulfhere ("Wolf Army"), Cynewulf ("Royal Wolf"), Cēnwulf ("Bold Wolf"), Wulfheard ("Wolf-hard"), Earnwulf ("Eagle Wolf"), Wulfstān ("Wolf Stone"), Æðelwulf ("Noble Wolf"), Wolfhroc ("Wolf-Frock"), Wolfhetan ("Wolf Hide"), Scrutolf ("Garb Wolf"), Wolfgang ("Wolf Gait"), and Wolfdregil ("Wolf Runner").

== Taxonomy ==
Canine phylogeny with ages of divergence

- 3.50 mya
  - 3.06 mya
    - 2.74 mya
      - 1.92 mya
        - 1.62 mya
          - 1.32 mya
            - 1.10 mya
              - Grey wolf
              - Coyote
            - African wolf
          - Ethiopian wolf
        - Golden jackal
      - Dhole
    - African wild dog
  - 2.62 mya
    - Side-striped jackal
    - Black-backed jackal

Cladogram and divergence of the grey wolf (including the domestic dog) among its closest extant relatives

In 1758, the Swedish botanist and zoologist Carl Linnaeus published in his Systema Naturae the binomial nomenclature. Canis is the Latin word meaning "dog", and under this genus he listed the doglike carnivores, including domestic dogs, wolves, and jackals. He classified the domestic dog as Canis familiaris, and the wolf as Canis lupus. Linnaeus considered the dog to be a separate species from the wolf because of its "cauda recurvata" (upturned tail), a unique feature among canids.

=== Subspecies ===
In the third edition of Mammal Species of the World published in 2005, the mammalogist W. Christopher Wozencraft listed under C. lupus 36 wild subspecies, and proposed two additional subspecies: familiaris (Linnaeus, 1758) and dingo (Meyer, 1793). Wozencraft included hallstromi—the New Guinea singing dog—as a taxonomic synonym for the dingo. All 38 subspecies of C. lupus were listed under the biological common name of "wolf". Studies using paleogenomic techniques reveal that the modern wolf and the dog are sister taxa, as modern wolves are not closely related to the population of wolves that was first domesticated. In 2019, a workshop hosted by the IUCN/Species Survival Commission's Canid Specialist Group concluded that the New Guinea singing dog and the dingo are feral Canis familiaris, and thus should not have IUCN Red List status.

=== Evolution ===
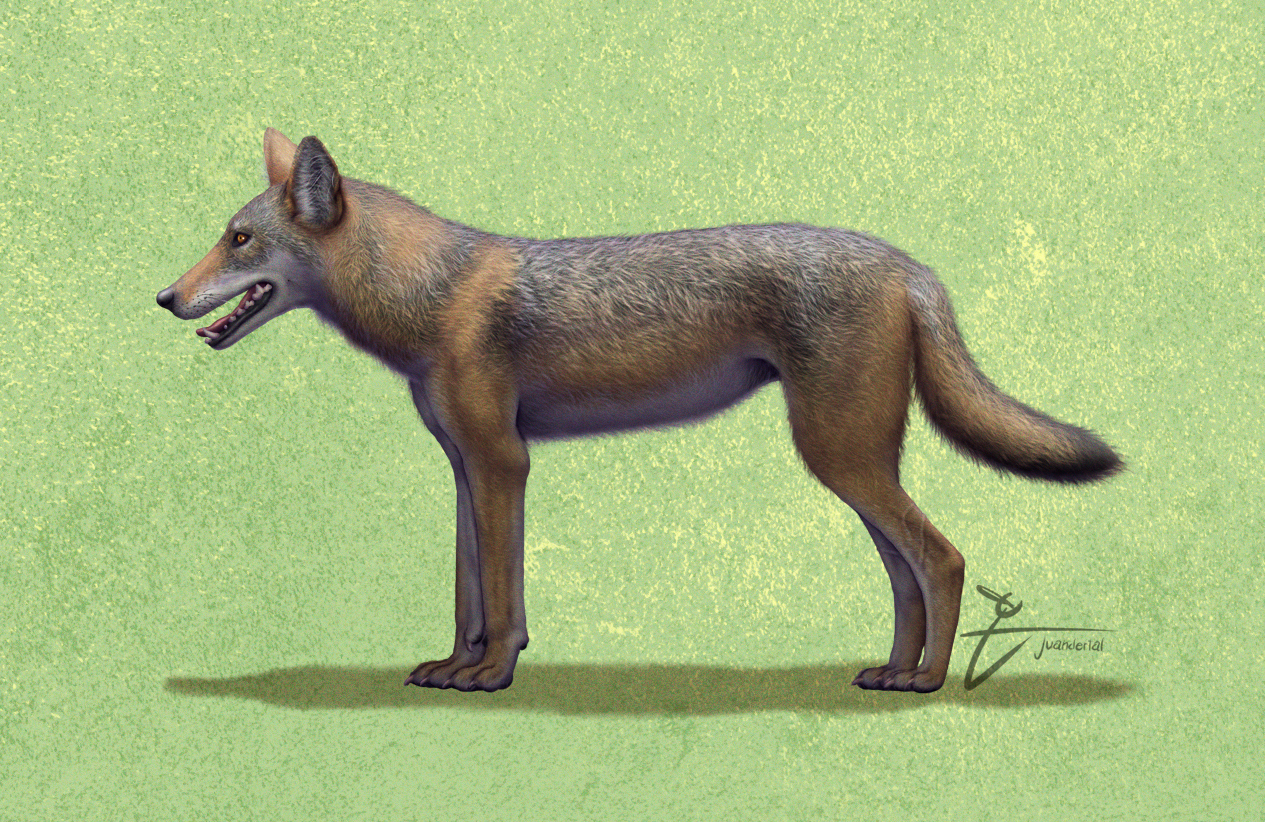
Life restoration of Canis mosbachensis, the wolf's immediate ancestor

The descent of the modern wolf C. lupus from the earlier C. mosbachensis (which in turn descended from C. etruscus) is widely accepted. Among the oldest fossils of the modern grey wolf is one from Ponte Galeria in Italy, dating to 406,500 ± 2,400 years ago. Remains from Cripple Creek Sump in Alaska may be considerably older, around 1 million years old, though differentiating between the remains of modern wolves and C. mosbachensis is difficult and ambiguous, with some authors choosing to include C. mosbachensis (which first appeared around 1.4 million years ago) as an early subspecies of C. lupus.

Considerable morphological diversity existed among wolves by the Late Pleistocene. Many Late Pleistocene wolf populations had more robust skulls and teeth than modern wolves, often with a shortened snout, a pronounced development of the temporalis muscle, and robust premolars. It is proposed that these features were specialized adaptations for the processing of carcass and bone associated with the hunting and scavenging of Pleistocene megafauna. Compared with modern wolves, some Pleistocene wolves showed an increase in tooth breakage similar to that seen in the extinct dire wolf. This suggests they either often processed carcasses, or that they competed with other carnivores and needed to consume their prey quickly. The frequency and location of tooth fractures in these wolves indicate they were habitual bone crackers like the modern spotted hyena.

Genomic studies suggest modern wolves and dogs descend from a common ancestral wolf population. A 2021 study found that the Himalayan wolf and the Indian plains wolf are part of a lineage that is basal (at the base) to other wolves and split from them 700,000–200,000 years ago. Other wolves appear to share most of their common ancestry much more recently, within the last 23,000 years (around the peak and the end of the Last Glacial Maximum), originating from Siberia or Beringia. While some sources have suggested that this was a consequence of a population bottleneck, other studies have suggested that this a result of gene flow homogenising ancestry.

A 2016 genomic study suggests that Old World and New World wolves split around 12,500 years ago, followed by the divergence of the lineage that led to dogs from other Old World wolves around 11,100–12,300 years ago. An extinct Late Pleistocene wolf may have been the ancestor of the dog, with the dog's similarity to the extant wolf being the result of genetic admixture between the two. The dingo, Basenji, Tibetan Mastiff and Chinese indigenous breeds are basal members of the domestic dog clade. The differentiation of wolves in Europe, the Middle East, and Asia is estimated to have occurred in just 1,600 years, roughly 11,700 years ago. Among New World wolves, populations diverged around 5,400 years ago.

=== Admixture with other canids ===
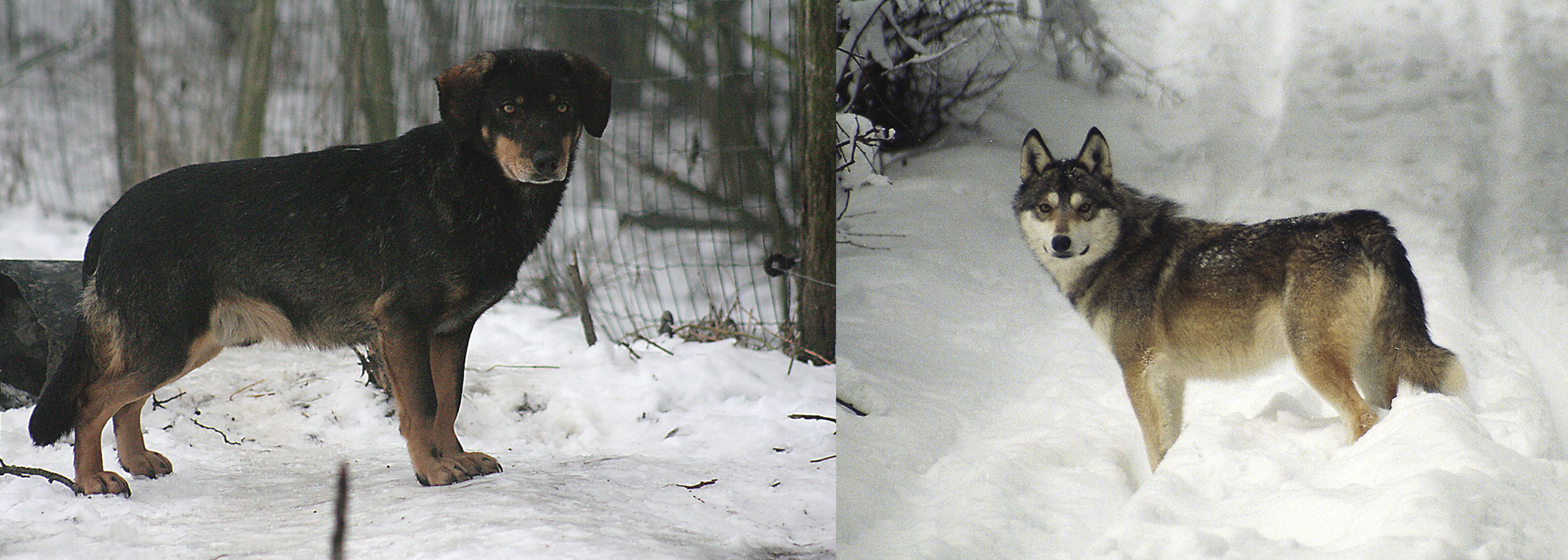
Wolf–dog hybrids in the wild animal park at Kadzidłowo, Poland. Left: product of a male wolf and a female spaniel; right: from a female wolf and a male West Siberian Laika

In the distant past, there was gene flow between African wolves, golden jackals, and grey wolves. The African wolf is a descendant of a genetically admixed canid of 72% wolf and 28% Ethiopian wolf ancestry. One African wolf from the Egyptian Sinai Peninsula showed admixture with Middle Eastern grey wolves and dogs. There is evidence of gene flow between golden jackals and Middle Eastern wolves, less so with European and Asian wolves, and least with North American wolves. This indicates the golden jackal ancestry found in North American wolves may have occurred before the divergence of the Eurasian and North American wolves.

The common ancestor of the coyote and the wolf is admixed with a ghost population of an extinct unidentified canid. This canid was genetically close to the dhole and evolved after the divergence of the African hunting dog from the other canid species. The mitochondrial (maternal-based) DNA of this unknown canid appears to be preserved in the coyote, which explains way the species' mitogenome is basal. Similarly, a museum specimen of a wolf from southern China collected in 1963 showed a genome that was 12–14% admixed from this unknown canid. In North America, some coyotes and wolves show varying degrees of past genetic admixture.

In more recent times, the Y (paternal based) chromosome in some Italian wolves shows evidence of interbreeding between female wolves and male dogs. In the Caucasus Mountains, gene flow between wolves and dogs, particularly livestock guarding ones, was found to be relatively common, with around 2–3% of samples likely from first generation hybrids. Although mating between golden jackals and wolves has never been observed, evidence of jackal-wolf hybridization was discovered through mitochondrial DNA analysis of jackals living in the Caucasus Mountains and in Bulgaria. In 2021, a genetic study found that the dog's similarity to the extant grey wolf was the result of substantial dog-into-wolf gene flow, with little evidence of the reverse.

== Description ==
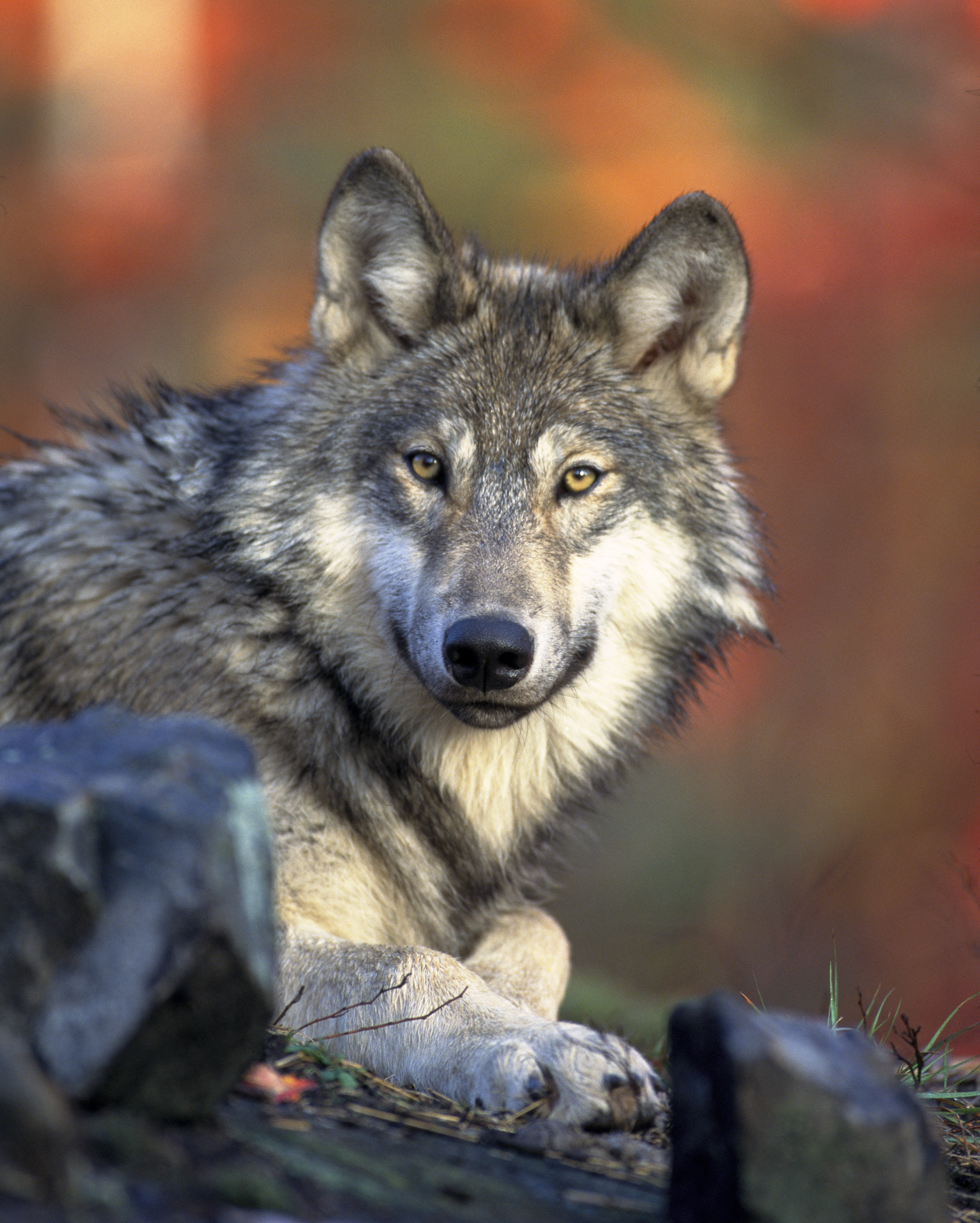
A North American wolf

The wolf is the largest extant member of the family Canidae. It is slender and powerfully built, with an extensive, low-hanging rib cage, a sloping back, and a heavily muscled neck. The wolf's legs are moderately longer than those of other canids, which enables the animal to move swiftly and through deep snow, though shorter-legged ecomorphs are found in some wolf populations. The wolf's head is large and heavy, with a wide forehead, powerful jaws, and a long, blunt muzzle. It has small, wide-set eyes and small pointed ears. The skull is 230–280 mm (9.1–11.0 in) in length and 130–150 mm (5.1–5.9 in) in width. The teeth are heavy and large, making them better suited to crushing bone than those of other canids, though they are not as specialized as those found in hyenas. Its molars have a flat surface for chewing, but less than that of the coyote which consumes more vegetation. Females tend to have slenderer builds and shorter legs than males.

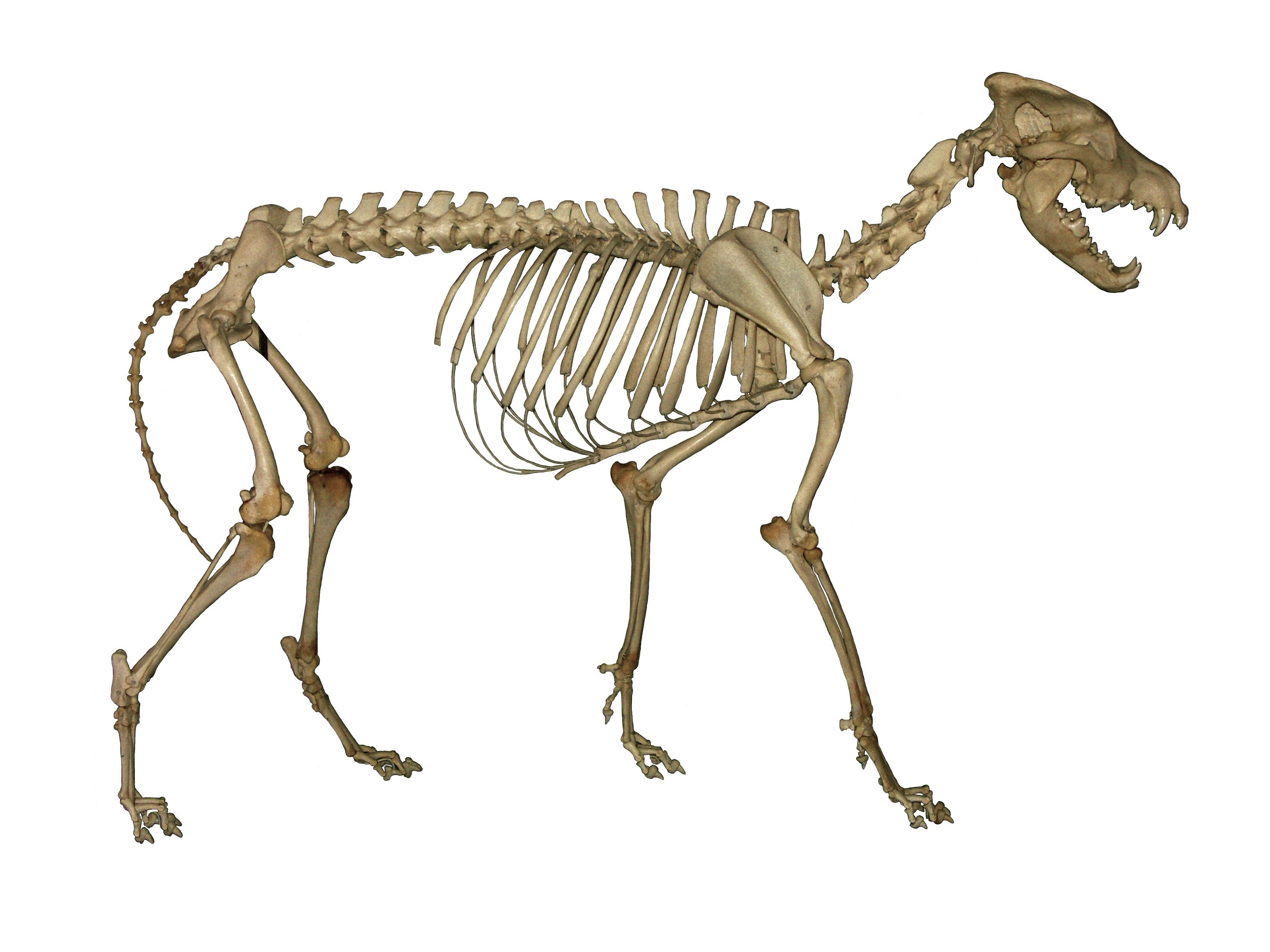
A wolf skeleton housed in the Wolf Museum, Abruzzo National Park, Italy

Adult wolves measure 105–160 cm (41–63 in) in length and 80–85 cm (31–33 in) at the shoulder. The tail measures 29–50 cm (11–20 in) in length, the ears 90–110 mm (3.5–4.3 in) in height, and the hind feet are 220–250 mm (8.7–9.8 in). The size and weight of the modern wolf increases proportionally with latitude in accordance with Bergmann's rule. The mean body mass of the wolf is 40 kg (88 lb), the smallest specimen recorded at 12 kg (26 lb) and the largest at 80 kg (180 lb). On average, European wolves weigh 38.5 kg (85 lb), North American wolves 36 kg (79 lb), and Indian and Arabian wolves 25 kg (55 lb). Females in any given wolf population typically weigh 5–10 lb (2.3–4.5 kg) less than males. Wolves rarely reach 54 kg (119 lb) in weight, though exceptionally large individuals have been recorded in Alaska and Canada. In central Russia, exceptionally large males can reach a weight of 69–79 kg (152–174 lb).

=== Coat ===
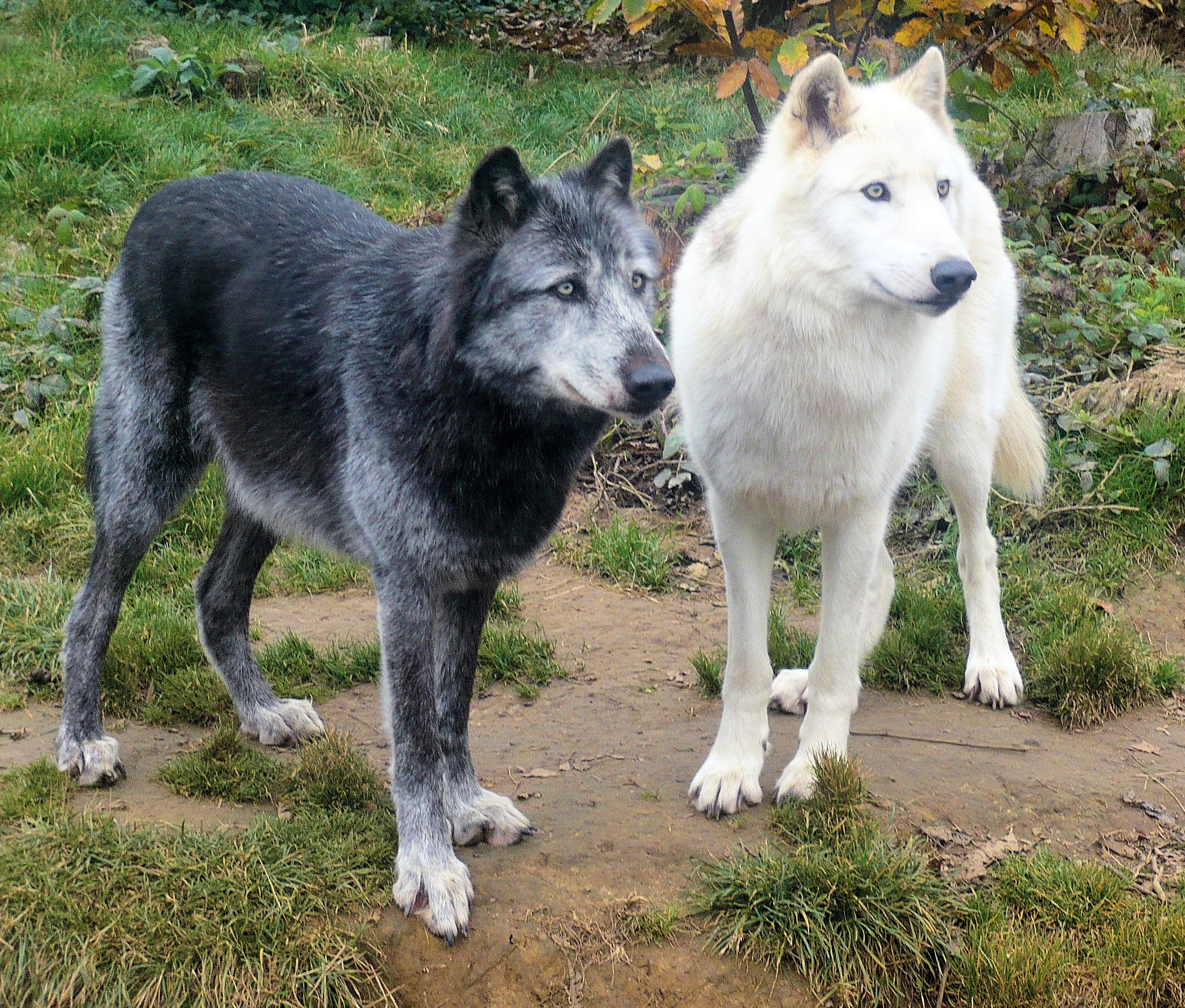
Wolves in the La Boissière-du-Doré Zoo, France

The wolf has a thick and fluffy winter coat, with the guard hairs being longer and rougher than the undercoat. It moults during spring, mostly the undercoat, before growing back in autumn. The hairs grow the longest along the back, particularly towards the front and on the neck. Especially long hairs grow on the shoulders and create a crest-like structure on the upper part of the neck. Long tufts exist on the cheeks. The short hairs on the ears are noticeable from the surrounding fur. Short, springy and dense hairs are present along the limbs from the elbows down to just above the heel. The winter fur is highly resistant to the cold. Wolves can easily rest in open areas at −40 °C (−40 °F) by covering their faces and muzzles with their rear legs and tail. A wolf's coat is better equipped for winter than a dog's and does not freeze when the animal breathes on it.

In cold climates, the wolf can reduce the flow of blood near its skin to conserve body heat. They have an independent warming system in their foot pads which prevents them from frostbiting as they walk on ice and snow. Wolves in warm climates have coarser and less dense fur. Female wolves tend to have smoother furred limbs and their coats generally get smoother as they age compared to males. Older wolves generally develop more white hairs at various spots on their coats. Winter fur typically fully moults later in lactating females, with hair shed earliest around the teats. Hair can grow 60–70 mm (2.4–2.8 in) on the middle of the back, and shoulder guard hairs can be as long as 110–130 mm (4.3–5.1 in), but are typically shorter than 90 mm (3.5 in).

Wolves are generally mottled grey, but can vary from white to brown to black. Their coats typically have grey, white, brown and black hairs. On the inner surface, the fur tends to be lighter. The summer coat of wolves in central Russia includes ochreous (yellow to orange) and rusty ochreous (orange/red/brown) hairs. In North America, the coat colors of wolves follow Gloger's rule, with wolves in the Canadian Arctic being white and those in southern Canada, the U.S., and Mexico being predominantly grey. In parts of the Western Canadian Rocky Mountains, the coat colour is predominantly black. Black wolves sometimes change to bluish-silver, silver or white over time. Black-coloured wolves in North America acquired their colour from wolf-dog admixture after the first arrival of dogs across the Bering Strait 12,000 to 14,000 years ago. Research into the inheritance of white colour from dogs into wolves has yet to be undertaken.

== Ecology ==
=== Distribution and habitat ===
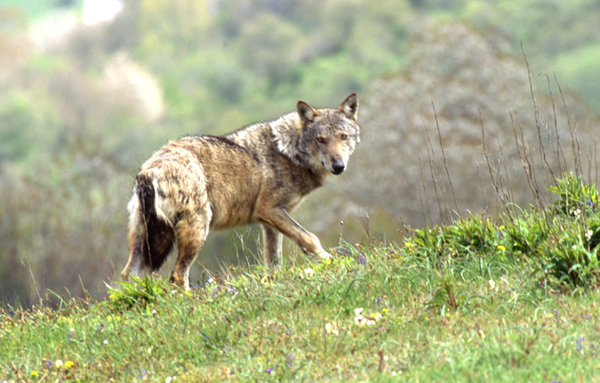
An Italian wolf in a mountainous habitat in the Apennines in Sassoferrato, Italy

Wolves occur across Eurasia and North America. However, it occupies only around one-third of its historic range due to human persecution; the wolf is now extirpated (locally extinct) from much of its range in Western Europe, the United States and Mexico, and completely extinct in the British Isles and Japan. The wolf occurs mostly in wilderness and remote areas, but can adapted to human-modified landscapes. Wolves live in forests, inland wetlands, shrublands, grasslands (including Arctic tundra). pastures, deserts, and rocky peaks on mountains. Habitat use by wolves depends on the abundance of prey, snow conditions, livestock densities, road densities, human presence, and topography.

=== Diet ===
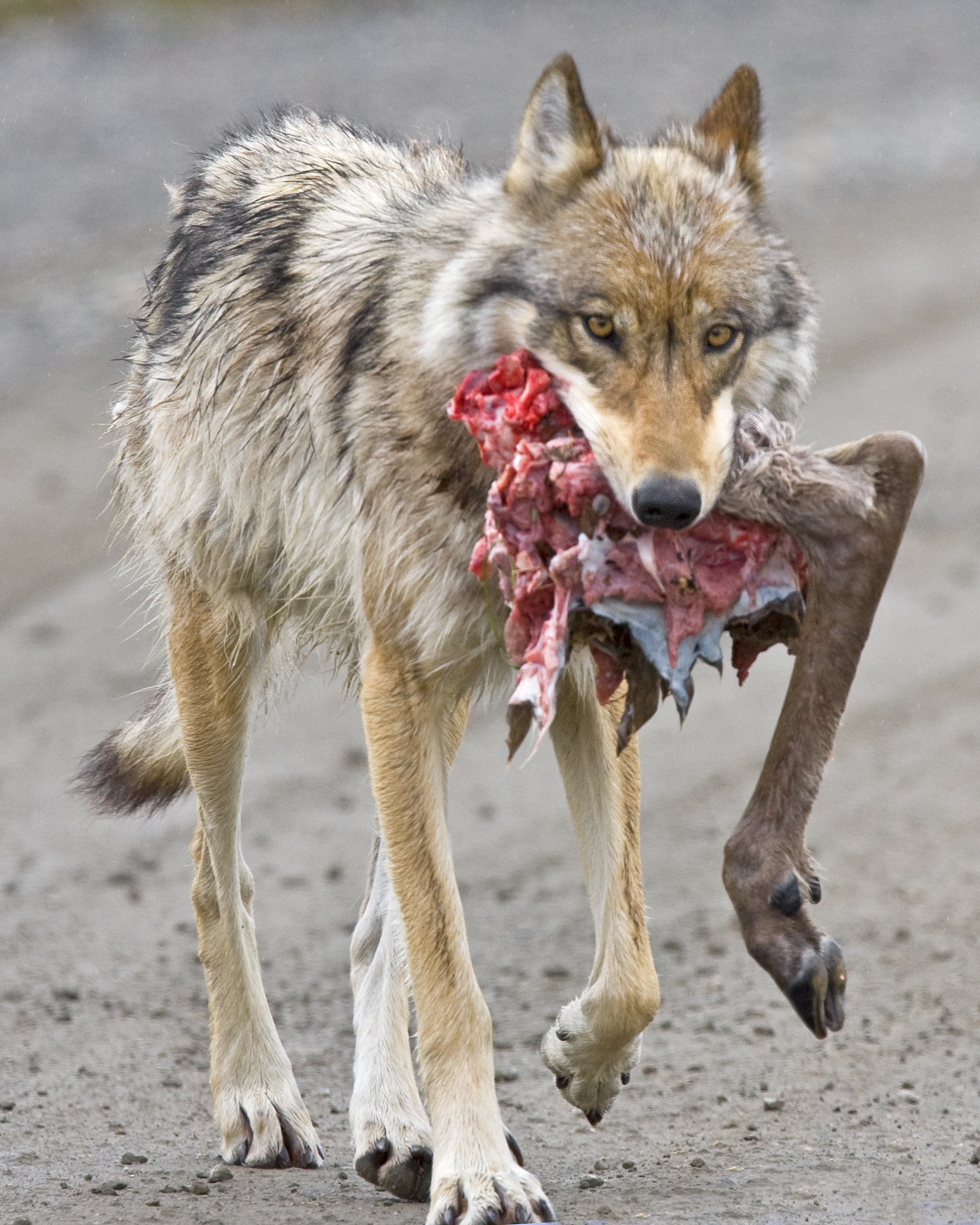
A wolf carrying a caribou hindquarter, Denali National Park, Alaska

The wolf is primarily a carnivore and can hunt prey as large as the combined mass of the pack members. The wolves generally target the most vulnerable individuals of large prey, with a pack of 15 able to bring down an adult moose. In North America, wolf primarily eat wild large hoofed mammals and medium-sized mammals. In Asia and Europe, they mostly prey on wild medium-sized hoofed mammals and domestic species. The wolf depends on wild species, and if these are not readily available, as in Asia, the wolf is more reliant on domestic species. In North America, important range-wide prey are elk, moose, caribou, white-tailed deer and mule deer. In Europe, species taken include wild boar, chamois, roe deer, red deer and moose, while wild prey in Asia include blackbuck, goitered gazelle and species of wild sheep. Wolves can digest their quickly, making quick use of large quantities of meat. When fully fed, fat is stored under the skin, around the heart, intestines, kidneys, and bone marrow, particularly during the autumn and winter.

Smaller mammals that may supplement their diet include rodents, hares and smaller carnivores. They will also eat birds and their eggs, as well as lizards, snakes, frogs and insects. Wolves in some areas may consume fish and even marine life. Wolves also consume some plant material; consuming eat apples, pears, figs, melons, berries and cherries in Europe. and blueberries and raspberries in North America. Other food food include the berries of mountain-ash, lily of the valley, bilberries, cowberries, European black nightshade and pears. They also eat grass, which likely causes them to vomit and clean out intestinal parasites or long guard hairs.

Wolves will eat carrion in times of scarcity. In some areas of Eurasia, many wolf populations subsist largely on livestock and garbage, due to lack of wild prey. Since natural prey in North America remains in suitable wild habitats, North American wolves rarely eat livestock and garbage only. Cannibalism can occur, particularly during scarcity and winters and wolves will even scavenge the bodies of pack members.

=== Interactions with other predators ===
Wolves may dominate other canid species in areas where they both occur. In North America, wolves commonly kill coyotes, especially when the latter try to feed on wolf kills. Wolves may attack coyote den sites, digging out and killing their pups. Wolves rarely eat the coyotes they kill. Reports of coyotes driving away wolves are uncommon, and involve the coyote pack being at least equal in numbers to the opposing wolves. Wolves may have a similar relationship with golden jackals in Eurasia, and appear to limit their distribution. Wolves also kill red and Arctic foxes, usually in disputes over carcasses. Competition with red foxes appears to be less intense than with coyotes.

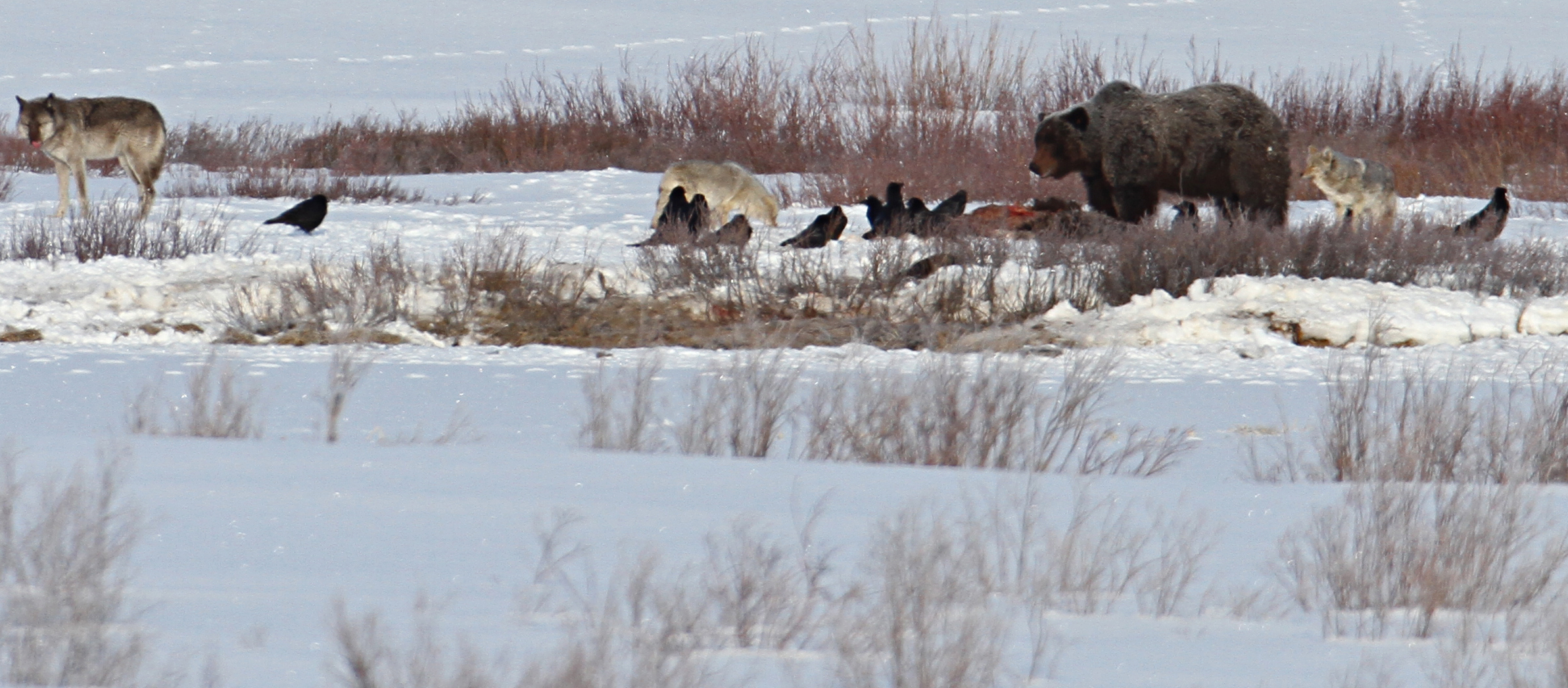
A wolf, a bear, coyotes and ravens compete over a kill

Brown bears typically dominate wolf packs in disputes over carcasses, while wolf packs mostly prevail against bears when defending their den sites. Both species kill each other's young. Wolves may eat brown bears they kill, while brown bears seem to limit consumption to young wolves. Records of wolf interactions with American black bears are less numerous as black bears live in more closed, forested areas. Wolves have been recorded tracking down American black bears in their dens and killing them without eating them. Unlike brown bears, American black bears frequently lose against wolves in disputes over kills. Wolves also dominate and sometimes kill wolverines, which flee from wolves into caves or up trees.

Wolves may interact and compete with felids, such as the Eurasian lynx, which may feed on smaller prey where wolves are present and may be suppressed by large wolf populations. Wolves encounter cougars along portions of the Rocky Mountains and adjacent mountain ranges. Wolves and cougars typically avoid encountering each other by hunting at different elevations for different prey (niche partitioning). This is more difficult during winter. Wolves in packs usually dominate cougars and can steal their kills or even kill them, while one-to-one encounters tend to be dominated by the cat, who likewise will kill wolves. Wolves more broadly affect cougar population dynamics and distribution by dominating territory and prey opportunities and disrupting the feline's behaviour. Wolf and Siberian tiger interactions are well-documented in the Russian Far East, where tigers significantly depress wolf numbers, sometimes to the point of localized extinction.

In Israel, Palestine, Central Asia and India, wolves may encounter striped hyenas, usually in disputes over carcasses. Striped hyenas feed extensively on wolf-killed carcasses in areas where the two species interact. One-to-one, hyenas dominate wolves and may prey on them, but wolf packs can drive off single or outnumbered hyenas. There is at least one case in Israel of a hyena associating and cooperating with a wolf pack.

=== Infections ===
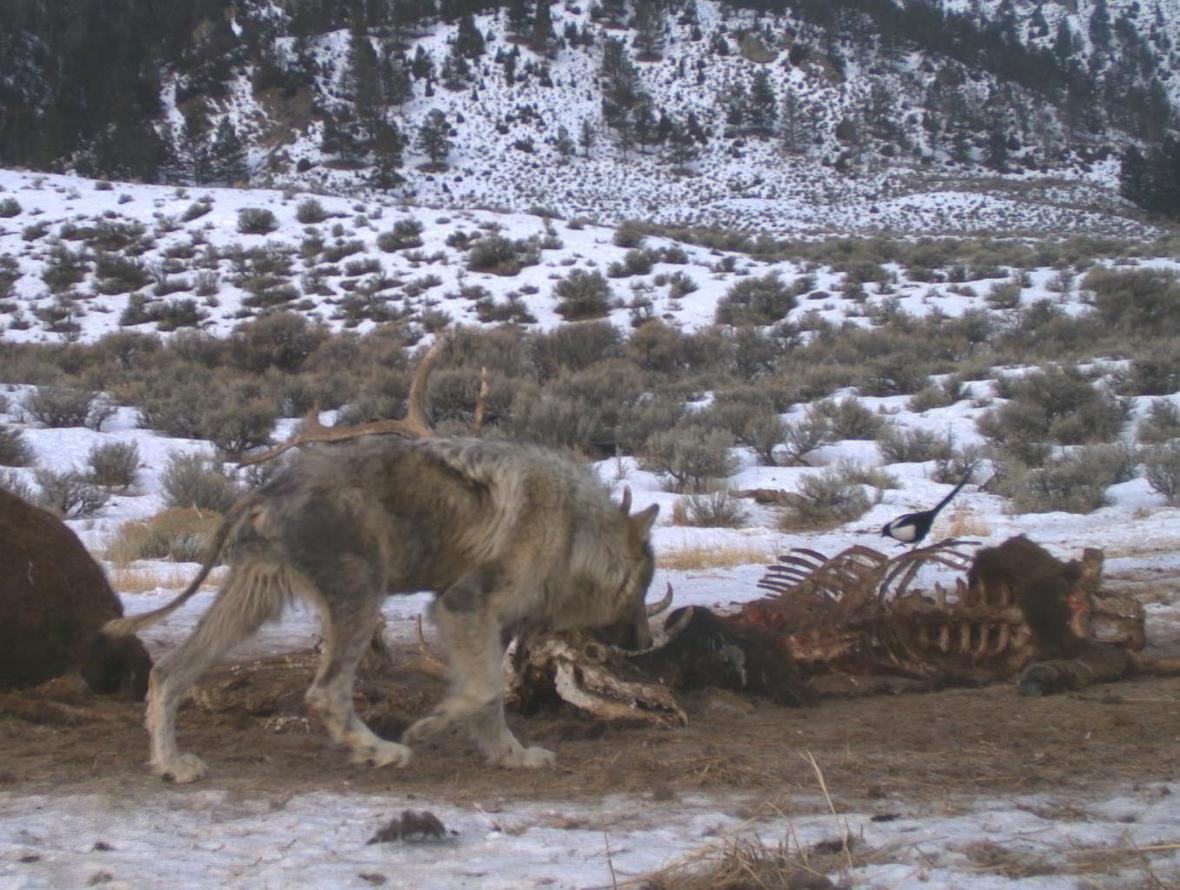
Wolf with mange Yellowstone National Park

Viral diseases carried by wolves include: rabies, canine distemper, canine parvovirus, infectious canine hepatitis, papillomatosis, and canine coronavirus. In wolves, the incubation period for rabies is eight to 21 days, and results in the host becoming agitated, deserting its pack, and traveling up to 80 km (50 mi) a day, thus increasing the risk of infecting other wolves. Although canine distemper is lethal in dogs, it has not been recorded to kill wolves, except in Canada and Alaska. The canine parvovirus, which causes death by dehydration, electrolyte imbalance, and endotoxic shock or sepsis, is largely survivable in wolves, but can be lethal to pups. Bacterial diseases carried by wolves include: brucellosis, Lyme disease, leptospirosis, tularemia, bovine tuberculosis, listeriosis and anthrax. Although lyme disease can debilitate individual wolves, it does not appear to affect wolf populations significantly. Leptospirosis can be contracted through contact with infected prey or urine, and can cause fever, anorexia, vomiting, anemia, hematuria, icterus, and death.

Wolves are often infested with a variety of arthropod exoparasites, including fleas, ticks, lice, and mites. The most harmful to wolves, particularly pups, is the mange mite (Sarcoptes scabiei), though they rarely develop full-blown mange, unlike foxes. Endoparasites known to infect wolves include: protozoans and helminths (flukes, tapeworms, roundworms and thorny-headed worms). Most fluke species reside in the wolf's intestines. Tapeworms are commonly found in wolves, which they get through their prey, and generally cause little harm in wolves, though this depends on the number and size of the parasites and the sensitivity of the host. Symptoms often include constipation, toxic and allergic reactions, irritation of the intestinal mucosa, and malnutrition. Wolves can carry over 30 roundworm species, though most roundworm infections appear benign, depending on the number of worms and the age of the host.

== Behaviour ==
=== Social structure ===
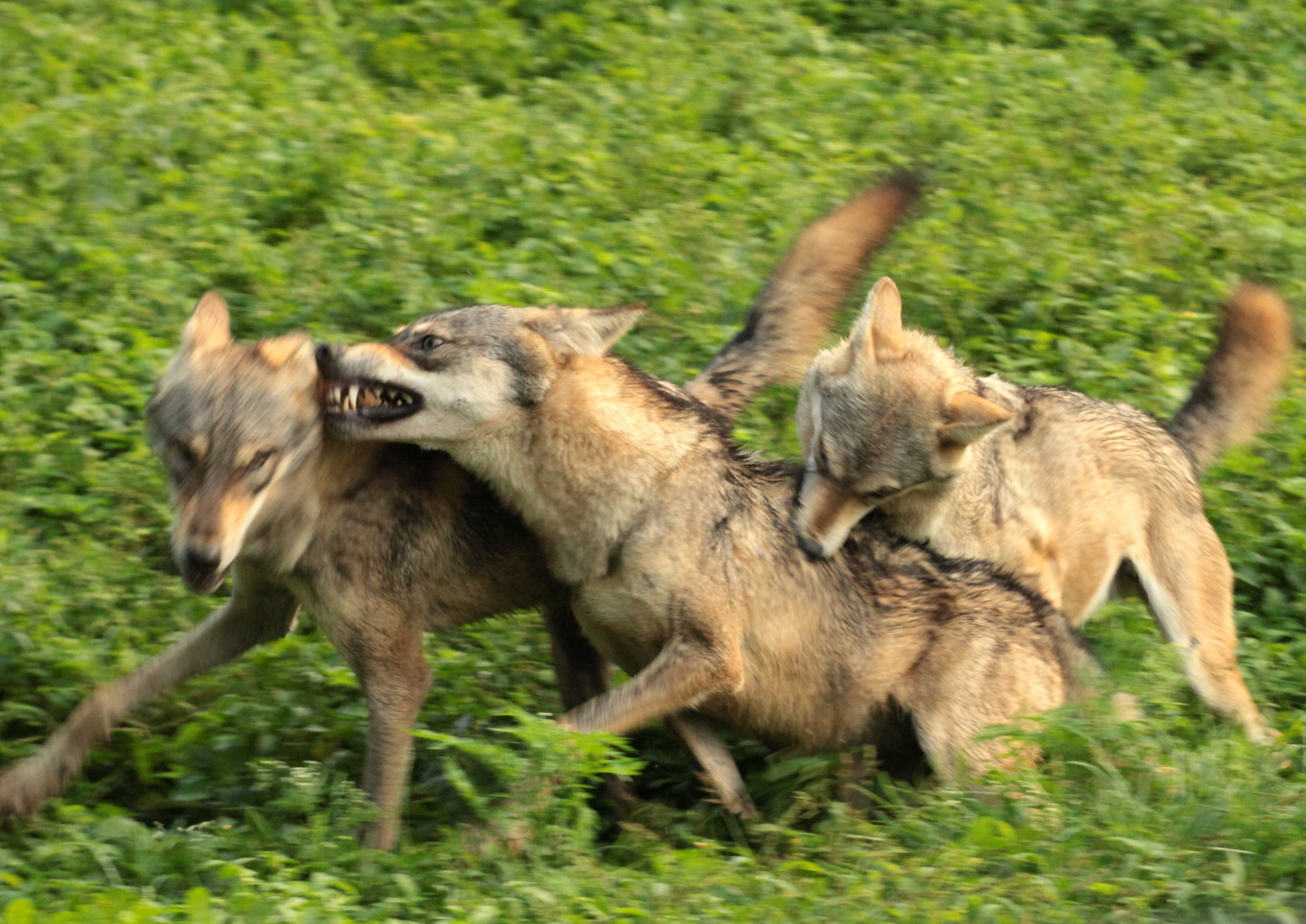
Indian wolves at the Mysore Zoo

The wolf is a social animal. Its populations consist of packs and lone wolves, most lone wolves being temporarily alone while they disperse from packs to form their own or join another one. The wolf's basic social unit is a mated pair accompanied by their offspring. The average pack size in North America is eight wolves and 5.5 in Europe. The average pack across Eurasia consists of a family of eight wolves (two adults, juveniles, and yearlings), or sometimes two or three such families, with examples of exceptionally large packs consisting of up to 42 wolves being known. Cortisol levels in wolves rise significantly when a pack member dies, indicating the presence of stress. During times of prey abundance caused by calving or migration, different wolf packs may join together temporarily.

Offspring typically stay in the pack for 10–54 months before dispersing. Triggers for dispersal include the onset of sexual maturity and competition within the pack for food. The distance traveled by dispersing wolves varies widely; some stay in the vicinity of the parental group, while other individuals may travel great distances of upwards of 206 km (128 mi), 390 km (240 mi), and 670 km (420 mi) from their natal (birth) packs. A new pack is usually founded by an unrelated dispersing male and female, travelling together in search of an area devoid of other hostile packs. Wolf packs rarely adopt other wolves into their fold and typically kill them. In the rare cases where other wolves are adopted, the adoptee is almost invariably an immature animal of one to three years old, and unlikely to compete for breeding rights with the mated pair. This usually occurs between the months of February and May. Adopted males may mate with an available pack female and then form their own pack. In some cases, a lone wolf is adopted into a pack to replace a deceased breeder.

Wolves are territorial and generally establish territories far larger than they require to survive, assuring a steady supply of prey. Territory size depends largely on the amount of prey available and the age of the pack's pups. They tend to increase in size in areas with low prey populations, or when the pups reach the age of six months, when they have the same nutritional needs as adults. Wolf packs travel constantly in search of prey, covering roughly 9% of their territory per day, on average 25 km/d (16 mi/d). The core of their territory is, on average, 35 km^{2} (14 sq mi), where they spend 50% of their time. Prey density tends to be much higher on the territory's periphery. Wolves tend to avoid hunting on the fringes of their range to avoid fatal confrontations with neighbouring packs. The smallest territory on record was held by a pack of six wolves in northeastern Minnesota, which occupied an estimated 33 km^{2} (13 sq mi). In comparison, the largest was held by an Alaskan pack of ten wolves encompassing 6,272 km^{2} (2,422 sq mi). Wolf packs are typically settled and usually leave their accustomed ranges only during severe food shortages. Territorial fights are among the principal causes of wolf mortality, with one study concluding that 14–65% of wolf deaths in Minnesota and the Denali National Park and Preserve were due to other wolves.

=== Communication ===
Wolves howling

Rallying cry

Wolves communicate using vocalizations, body postures, scent, touch, and taste. The phases of the moon do not affect wolf vocalization, and despite popular belief, wolves do not howl at the Moon. Wolves howl to assemble the pack usually before and after hunts, to pass on an alarm particularly at a den site, to locate each other during a storm, while crossing unfamiliar territory, and to communicate across great distances. Wolf howls can under certain conditions be heard over areas of up to 130 km^{2} (50 sq mi). Other vocalizations include growls, barks and whines. Wolves do not bark as loudly or continuously as dogs do in confrontations, rather barking a few times and then retreating from a perceived danger. Aggressive or self-assertive wolves are characterized by their slow and deliberate movements, high body posture and raised hackles, while submissive ones carry their bodies low, flatten their fur, and lower their ears and tail.

Scent marking involves urine, feces, and preputial and anal gland scents. This is more effective at advertising territory than howling and is often used in combination with scratch marks. Wolves increase their rate of scent marking when they encounter the marks of wolves from other packs. Lone wolves will rarely mark, but newly bonded pairs will scent mark the most. These marks are generally left every 240 m (790 ft) throughout the territory on regular travelways and junctions. Such markers can last for two to three weeks, and are typically placed near rocks, boulders, trees, or the skeletons of large animals. Raised-leg urination is considered to be one of the most important forms of scent communication in the wolf, making up 60–80% of all scent marks observed.

=== Reproduction ===
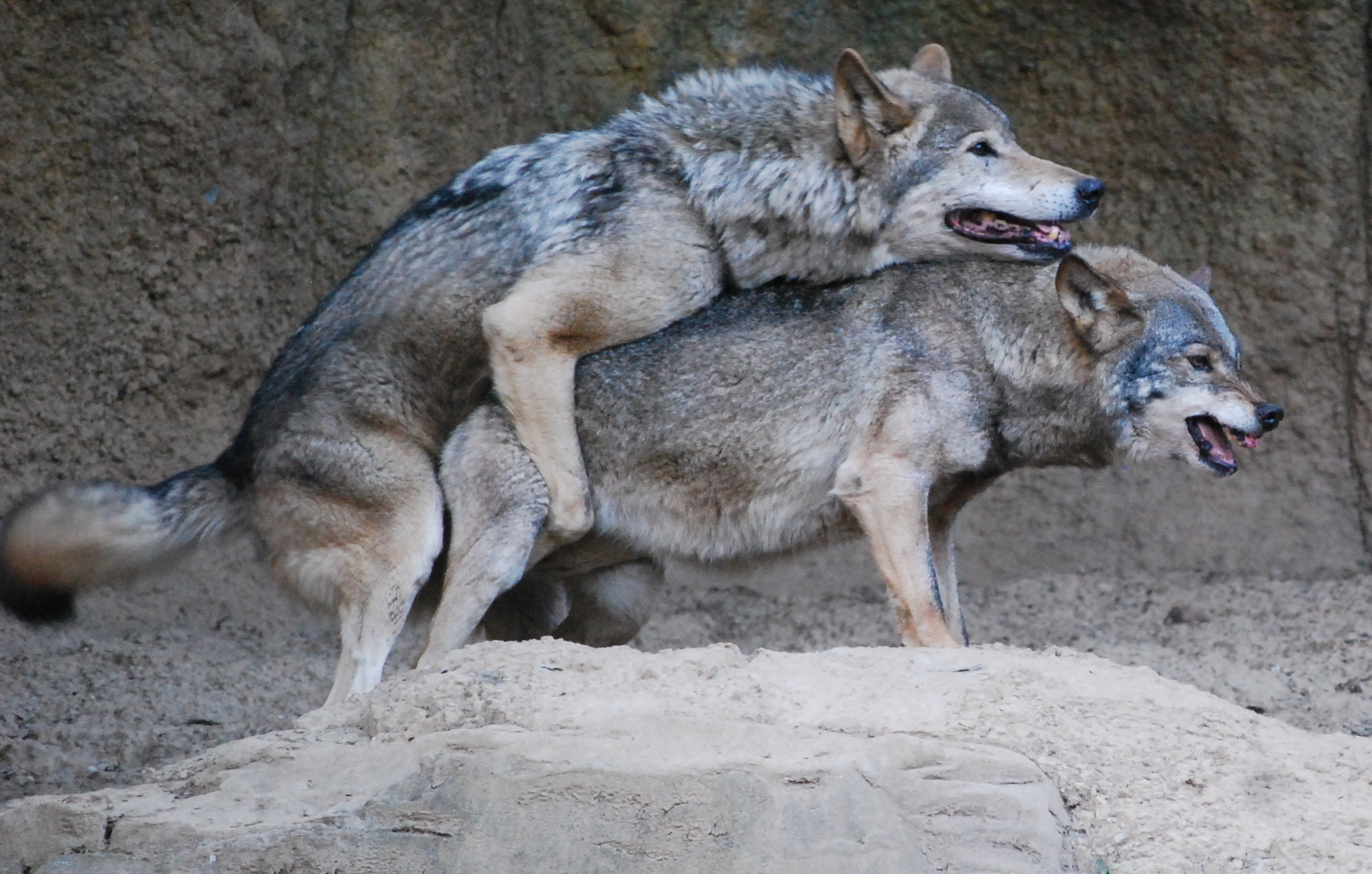
Eurasian wolves mating in the Tama Zoological Park, Japan

Wolves are monogamous, with mated pairs usually remaining together for life. Should one of the pair die, another mate is found quickly. With wolves in the wild, inbreeding does not occur where outbreeding is possible. Wolves become mature at the age of two years and sexually mature at the age of three years. The age of first breeding in wolves depends largely on environmental factors: when food is plentiful, or when wolf populations are heavily managed, wolves can rear pups at younger ages to exploit abundant resources better. Females are capable of producing pups every year, with one litter annually being the average. Oestrus and rut begin in the second half of winter and last for two weeks.

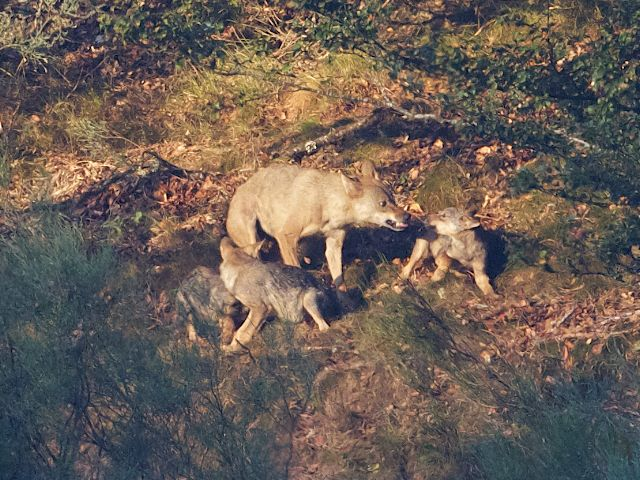
Iberian wolf pups stimulating their mother to regurgitate some food

Dens are usually constructed for pups during the summer period. When building dens, females make use of natural shelters like fissures in rocks, cliffs overhanging riverbanks and holes thickly covered by vegetation. Sometimes, the den is the appropriated burrow of smaller animals such as foxes, badgers or marmots. An appropriated den is often widened and partly remade. On rare occasions, female wolves dig burrows themselves, which are usually small and short with one to three openings. The den is usually constructed not more than 500 m (1,600 ft) away from a water source. It typically faces southwards where it can be better warmed by sunlight exposure, and the snow can thaw more quickly. Resting places, play areas for the pups, and food remains are commonly found around wolf dens. The odor of urine and rotting food emanating from the denning area often attracts scavenging birds like magpies and ravens. Though they mostly avoid areas within human sight, wolves have been known to nest near homes, paved roads and railways. During pregnancy, female wolves remain in a den located away from the peripheral zone of their territories, where violent encounters with other packs are less likely to occur.

The gestation period lasts 62–75 days, with pups usually being born in the spring months or early summer in very cold places such as on the tundra. Young females give birth to four to five young, and older females give birth to six to eight young and up to 14. Their mortality rate is 60–80%. Newborn wolf pups look similar to German Shepherd Dog pups. They are born blind and deaf and are covered in short, soft, greyish-brown fur. They weigh 300–500 g (11–18 oz) at birth and begin to see after nine to 12 days. The milk canines erupt after one month. Pups first leave the den after three weeks. At one-and-a-half months of age, they are agile enough to flee from danger. Mother wolves do not leave the den for the first few weeks, relying on the fathers to provide food for them and their young. Pups begin to eat solid food at the age of three to four weeks. They have a fast growth rate during their first four months of life: during this period, a pup's weight can increase nearly 30 times. Wolf pups begin play-fighting at the age of three weeks, though unlike young coyotes and foxes, their bites are gentle and controlled. Actual fights to establish hierarchy usually occur at five to eight weeks of age. This is in contrast to young coyotes and foxes, which may begin fighting even before the onset of play behaviour. By autumn, the pups are mature enough to accompany the adults on hunts for large prey.

=== Hunting and feeding ===
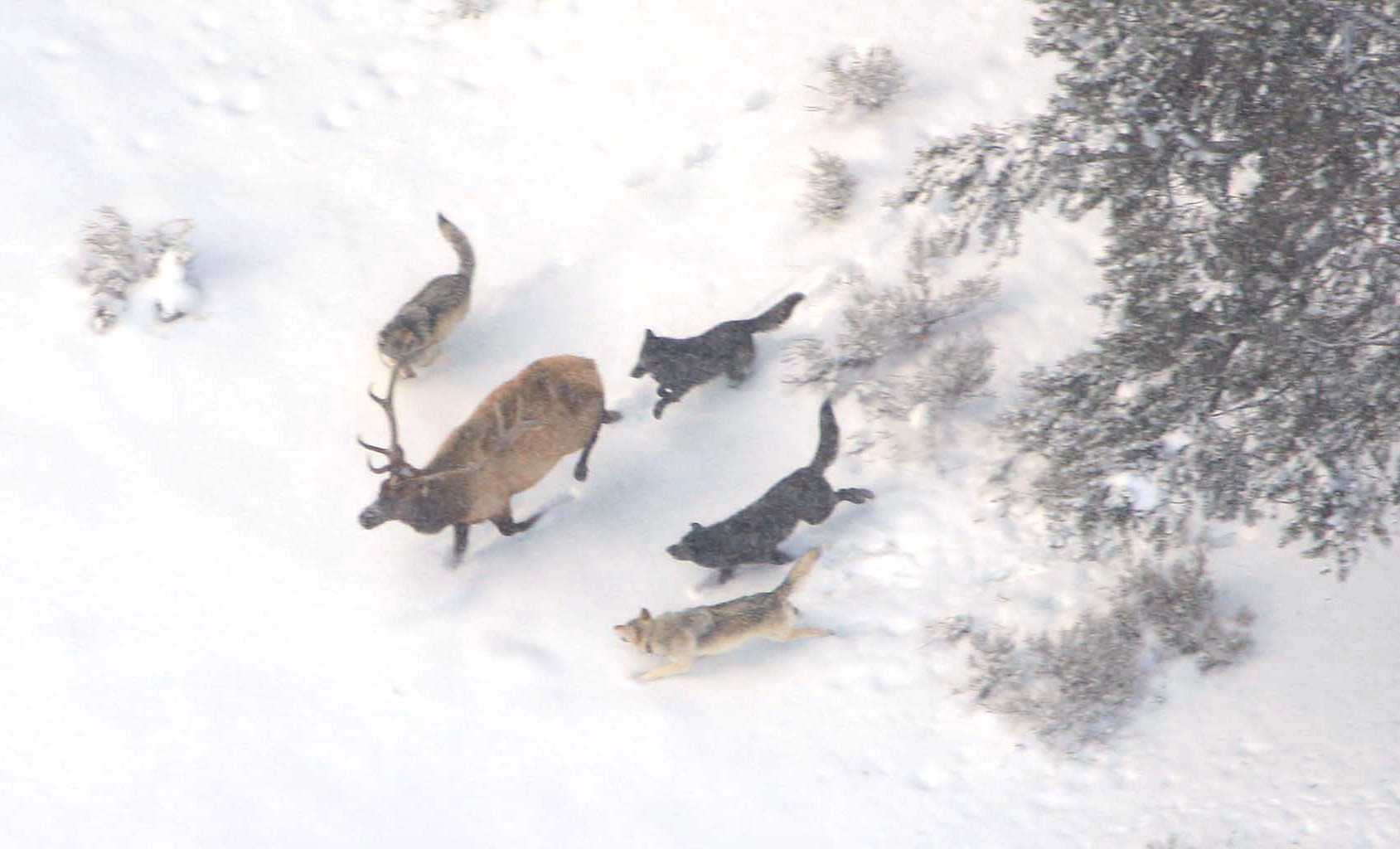
Wolves pursuing a bull elk

Single wolves or mated pairs typically have higher success rates in hunting than do large packs; single wolves have occasionally been observed to kill large prey such as moose, bison and muskoxen unaided. The size of a wolf hunting pack is related to the number of pups that survived the previous winter, adult survival, and the rate of dispersing wolves leaving the pack. The optimal pack size for hunting elk is four wolves, and for bison, a large pack size is more successful. Wolves move around their territory when hunting, using the same trails for extended periods. Wolves are nocturnal predators. During the winter, a pack will commence hunting in the twilight of early evening and will hunt all night, traveling tens of kilometres. Sometimes hunting large prey occurs during the day. During the summer, wolves generally tend to hunt individually, ambushing their prey and rarely giving pursuit.

When hunting large gregarious prey, wolves will try to isolate an individual from its group. If successful, a wolf pack can bring down game that will feed it for days, but one error in judgment can lead to serious injury or death. Most large prey have developed defensive adaptations and behaviours. Wolves have been killed while attempting to bring down bison, elk, moose, muskoxen, and even by one of their smallest hoofed prey, the white-tailed deer. With smaller prey like beaver, geese, and hares, there is no risk to the wolf. Although people often believe wolves can easily overcome any of their prey, their success rate in hunting hoofed prey is usually low.

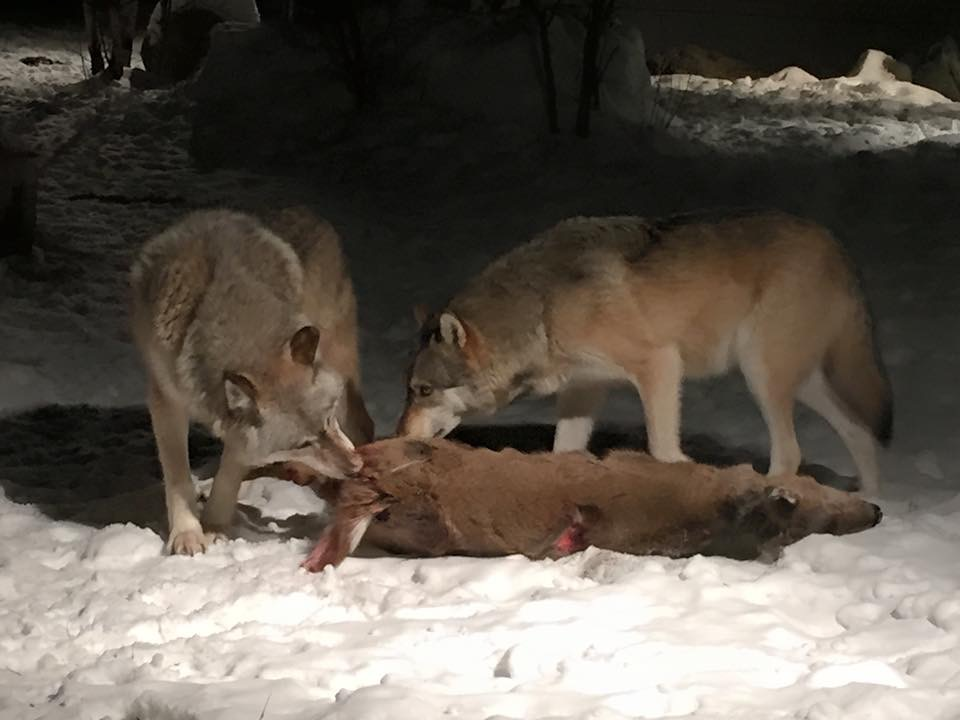
Two wolves feeding on a white-tailed deer

The wolf must give chase and gain on its fleeing prey, slow it down by biting through thick hair and hide, and then disable it enough to begin feeding. Wolves may wound large prey and then lie around resting for hours before killing it when it is weaker due to blood loss, thereby lessening the risk of injury to themselves. With medium-sized prey, such as roe deer or sheep, wolves kill by biting the throat, severing nerve tracts and the carotid artery, thus causing the animal to die within a few seconds to a minute. With small, mouselike prey, wolves leap in a high arc and immobilize it with their forepaws.

Once prey is brought down, wolves begin to feed excitedly, ripping and tugging at the carcass in all directions, and bolting down large chunks of it. The breeding pair typically monopolizes food to continue producing pups. When food is scarce, this is done at the expense of other family members, especially non-pups. Wolves typically commence feeding by gorging on the larger internal organs, like the heart, liver, lungs, and stomach lining. The kidneys and spleen are eaten once they are exposed, followed by the muscles. A wolf can eat 15–19% of its body weight in one sitting.

=== Intelligence and cognition ===
A 2025 field report documented a wolf pulling a crab trap's buoy and line to bring the submerged trap to shore and access its bait cup, which the authors described as potential tool use and as suggesting "a sophisticated understanding of the multi-step connection between the floating buoy and the bait within the out-of-sight trap." They noted that whether the behavior qualifies as tool use depends on the definition, and that similar damage and a second instance involving a partially submerged trap were recorded, though the origin and prevalence of the behavior remain unknown.

== Status and conservation ==
The global wild wolf population in 2003 was estimated at 300,000. Wolf population declines in North America and Europe have been arrested since the late 20th century. This has fostered recolonization and reintroduction in parts of its former range as a result of legal protection, changes in land use, and the increase of people living in cities. In Asia, wolves are still found in numerous habitats. Conflicts with humans over wild game and livestock, concerns over the danger posed by wolves to people, and habitat fragmentation pose a continued threat to the wolf. On the IUCN Red List, it is classified as Least Concern because of its "relatively widespread range and stable population trend". The species is listed under Appendix II of the Convention on International Trade in Endangered Species of Wild Fauna and Flora (CITES), meaning international trade in the species (including parts and derivatives) is regulated. However, populations of Bhutan, India, Nepal and Pakistan are listed in Appendix I which prohibits commercial international trade in wild-sourced specimens.

=== North America ===
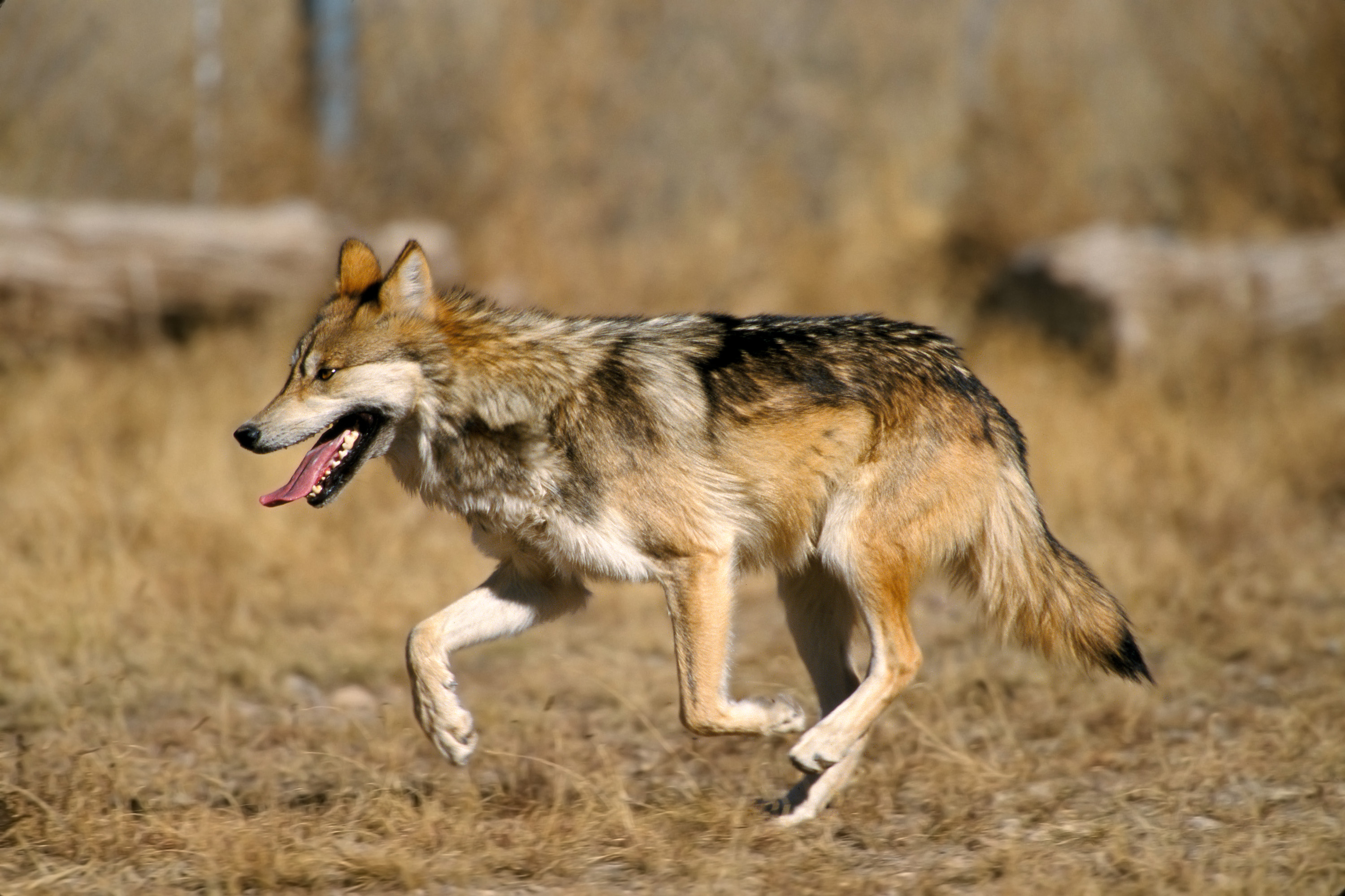
Captive Mexican wolf at Sevilleta National Wildlife Refuge in New Mexico, as part of reintroduction

In Canada, 52,000–60,000 wolves live in 80% of their historical range. Canadian law requires licenses for the hunting and trapping of wolves, expect for First Nations people which have no restrictions. As many as 4,000 wolves may be harvested in Canada each year. The wolf is a protected species in national parks under the Canada National Parks Act. In Alaska, 7,000–11,000 wolves are found on 85% of the state's land. Hunting or trapping a wolf requires a license, and around 1,200 individuals are taken each year.

In the contiguous United States, wolf declines were caused by predator extermination campaigns. Wolves were given protection under the Endangered Species Act (ESA) of 1973, and have since returned to parts of their former range thanks to both natural recolonizations and reintroductions in Yellowstone and Idaho. Wolves have repopulated the Great Lakes states of Minnesota, Wisconsin and Michigan where they number over 4,000 as of 2018. Wolves also occupy much of the northern Rocky Mountains region and the northwest, with a total population over 3,000 as of the 2020s. In Mexico and parts of the southwestern United States, the Mexican and U.S. governments collaborated from 1977 to 1980 in capturing all Mexican wolves remaining in the wild to prevent their extinction and established captive breeding programs for reintroduction. As of 2026, the reintroduced Mexican wolf population numbers over 300 individuals.

=== Eurasia ===
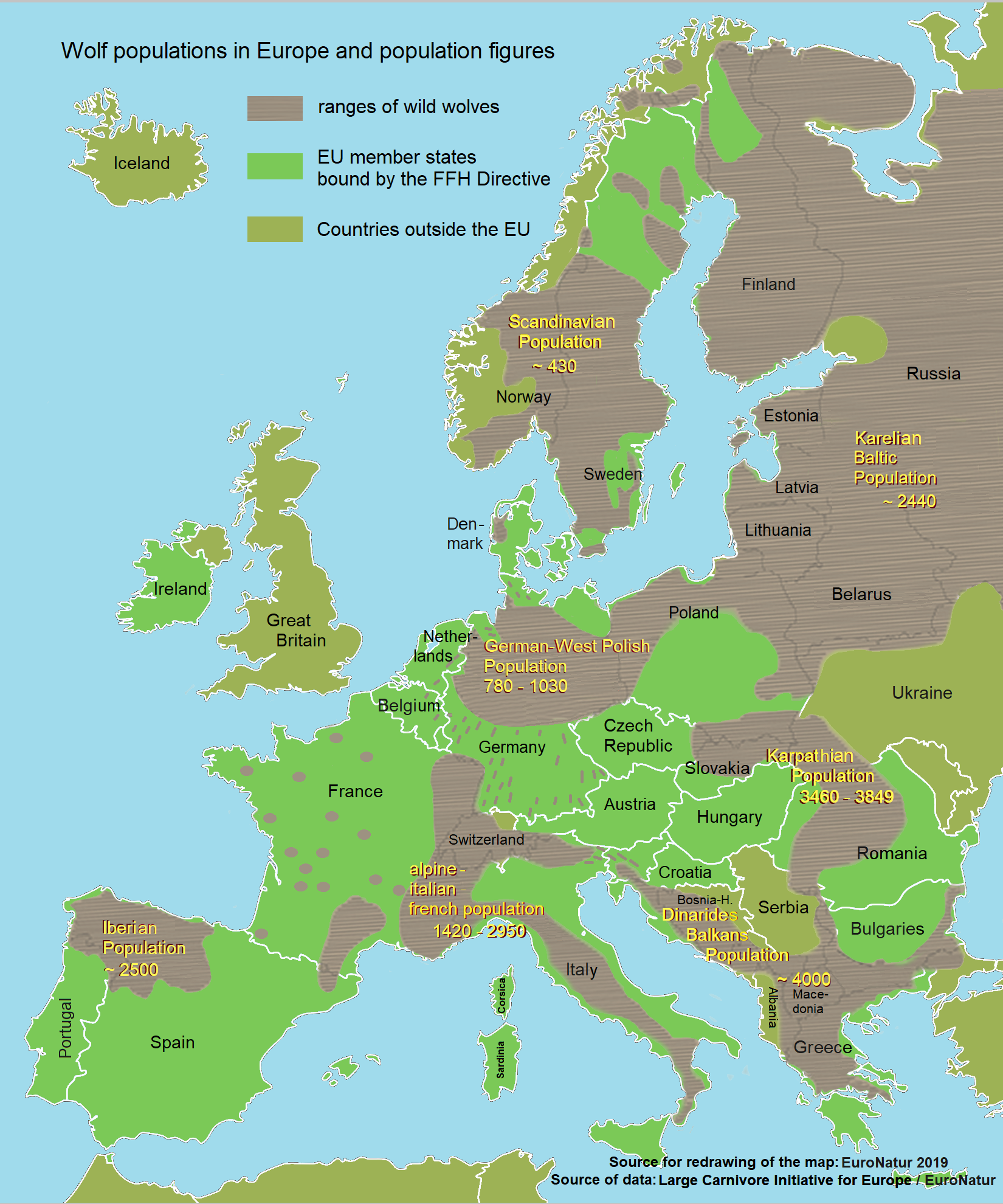
Wolf populations in Europe 2019 (according to incomplete monitoring data of the Large Carnivore Initiative for Europe)

The European Union has over 20,000 wolves with breeding packs in 23 countries. In many EU countries, the wolf is strictly protected under the 1979 Berne Convention on the Conservation of European Wildlife and Natural Habitats (Appendix II) and the 1992 Council Directive 92/43/EEC on the Conservation of Natural Habitats and of Wild Fauna and Flora (Annex II and IV). Though protected in many European countries, enforcement is not consistent across borders.

Wolves have been persecuted in Europe for centuries, having been exterminated in Great Britain by 1684, in Ireland by 1770, in Central Europe by 1899, in France by the 1930s, and in much of Scandinavia by the early 1970s. They continued to survive in parts of Finland, Eastern Europe, and Southern Europe. Since 1980, European wolves have rebounded and expanded into parts of their former range. This appears to have correlated with the decline of the traditional pastoral and rural economies, which drive the incentive to kill wolves. As of 2016, estimates of wolf numbers include: 4,000 in the Balkans, 3,460–3,849 in the Carpathian Mountains, 1,700–2,240 in the Baltic states, 1,100–2,400 in the Italian Peninsula, and around 2,500 in the northwest Iberian peninsula as of 2007.

In the former Soviet Union, wolf populations have retained much of their historical range despite Soviet-era large-scale extermination campaigns. Their numbers range from 1,500 in Georgia to 20,000 in Kazakhstan and up to 45,000 in Russia. In Russia, the wolf is regarded as a pest because it preys on livestock, and wolf management means controlling lethally their numbers throughout the year. Russian history over the past century shows that reduced hunting leads to an increase of wolves. The Russian government has continued to pay bounties for wolves, and annual harvests of 20–30% do not appear to deplete their numbers significantly.

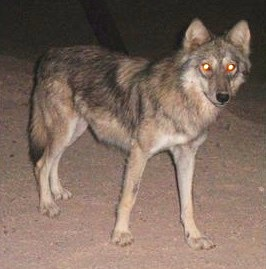
A wolf in southern Israel

In the Middle East, only Israel and Oman give wolves unambiguous legal protection. Israel has protected its wolves since 1954 and has maintained a moderately sized population of 150 by successfully enforcing its conservation laws. These wolves have spread through the region. Approximately 300–600 wolves inhabit the Arabian Peninsula. The wolf also appears to be widespread in Iran. Turkey has an estimated population of about 7,000 wolves. Outside of Turkey, wolf populations in the Middle East may total 1,000–2,000.

In Pakistan, wolves have lost much of their historic population numbers and range due to habitat destruction and conflict with humans. They remain mostly in large deserts and mountainous areas. The wolf has been protected in India since 1972. As of 2019, it is estimated that there are around 2,000–3,000 Indian wolves in the country. In East Asia, Mongolia's population numbers 10,000–20,000. In China, Heilongjiang has roughly 650 wolves, Xinjiang has 10,000 and Tibet has 2,000. 2017 evidence suggests that wolves range across all of mainland China. Wolves have been historically persecuted in China but have been legally protected since they were listed as vulnerable on the China Red List in 1998. The last Japanese wolf was captured and killed in 1905.

== Relationships with humans ==
=== In culture ===
==== In folklore, religion and mythology ====
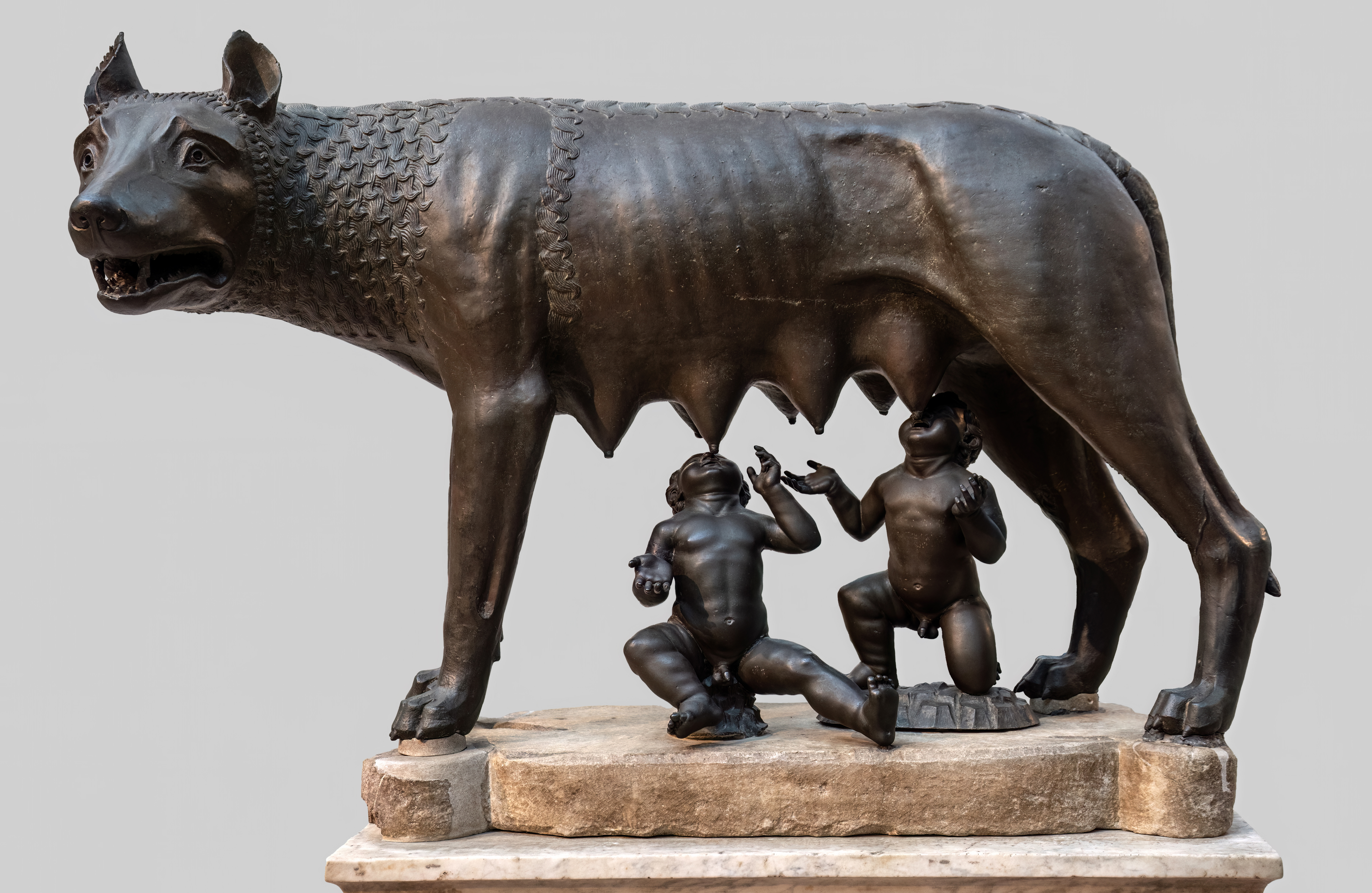
The Capitoline Wolf, sculpture of the mythical she-wolf feeding the twins Romulus and Remus, from the legend of the founding of Rome, Italy, 13th century AD. (The twins are a 15th-century addition.)

The wolf is a common motif in the mythologies and cosmologies of peoples throughout its historical range. The Ancient Greeks associated wolves with Apollo, the god of light and order. The Ancient Romans connected the wolf with their god of war and agriculture, Mars, and believed their city's founders, Romulus and Remus, were suckled by a she-wolf. Norse mythology includes the feared giant wolf Fenrir, and Geri and Freki, who are Odin's pets.

In Chinese astronomy, the wolf represents Sirius and protects the constellation of Ursa Major which is considered to be the heavenly palace. In China, the wolf was traditionally associated with greed and cruelty and wolf epithets are connected to negative behaviours such as cruelty ("wolf's heart"), mistrust ("wolf's look") and lechery ("wolf-sex"). In both Hinduism and Buddhism, the wolf is ridden by gods of protection. In Vedic Hinduism, the wolf is a symbol of the night from which the daytime quail escapes. In Tantric Buddhism, wolves are depicted as inhabitants of graveyards and destroyers of corpses.

In the Pawnee creation myth, the wolf was the first animal to be killed by humans, which lead to the latter's loss of immortality. The Pawnee called Sirius the "wolf star", and connected its appearance and disappearance in the sky to the wolf travelling to and from the spirit world. Both the Pawnee and Blackfoot considered the Milky Way the "wolf trail". The wolf is also an important crest symbol for clans of the Pacific Northwest like the Kwakwakaʼwakw.

The concept of people turning into wolves, and the inverse, has been present in many cultures. One Greek myth tells of Lycaon being transformed into a wolf by Zeus as punishment for his evil deeds. The legend of the werewolf has been widespread in European folklore and has been recorded since ancient times. The Navajo have traditionally believed that witches would turn into wolves by wearing wolf skins and would kill people and desecrate graveyards. In Dena'ina myth, wolves were previously men and thus family.

==== In fable and literature ====
Aesop used wolves in several of his fables, tapping into the fears of the sheep-herding Ancient Greeks. His most famous is the fable of "The Boy Who Cried Wolf", which warns about deliberately creating false alarms. Some of his other fables address anxieties over the close relationship between wolves and the sheep-guarding dogs, and the potential for a dog's betrayal. Although Aesop merely used wolves as tools for morality tales, his portrayals added to the wolf's image as a deceitful and dangerous animal. The Bible uses an image of a wolf lying with a lamb in a peaceful vision of the future. In the New Testament, Jesus is said to have used wolves as illustrations of the dangers his followers, whom he represents as sheep, would face should they leave him, the shepherd. He is also quoted as comparing 'false prophets' to wolves in sheep's clothing.

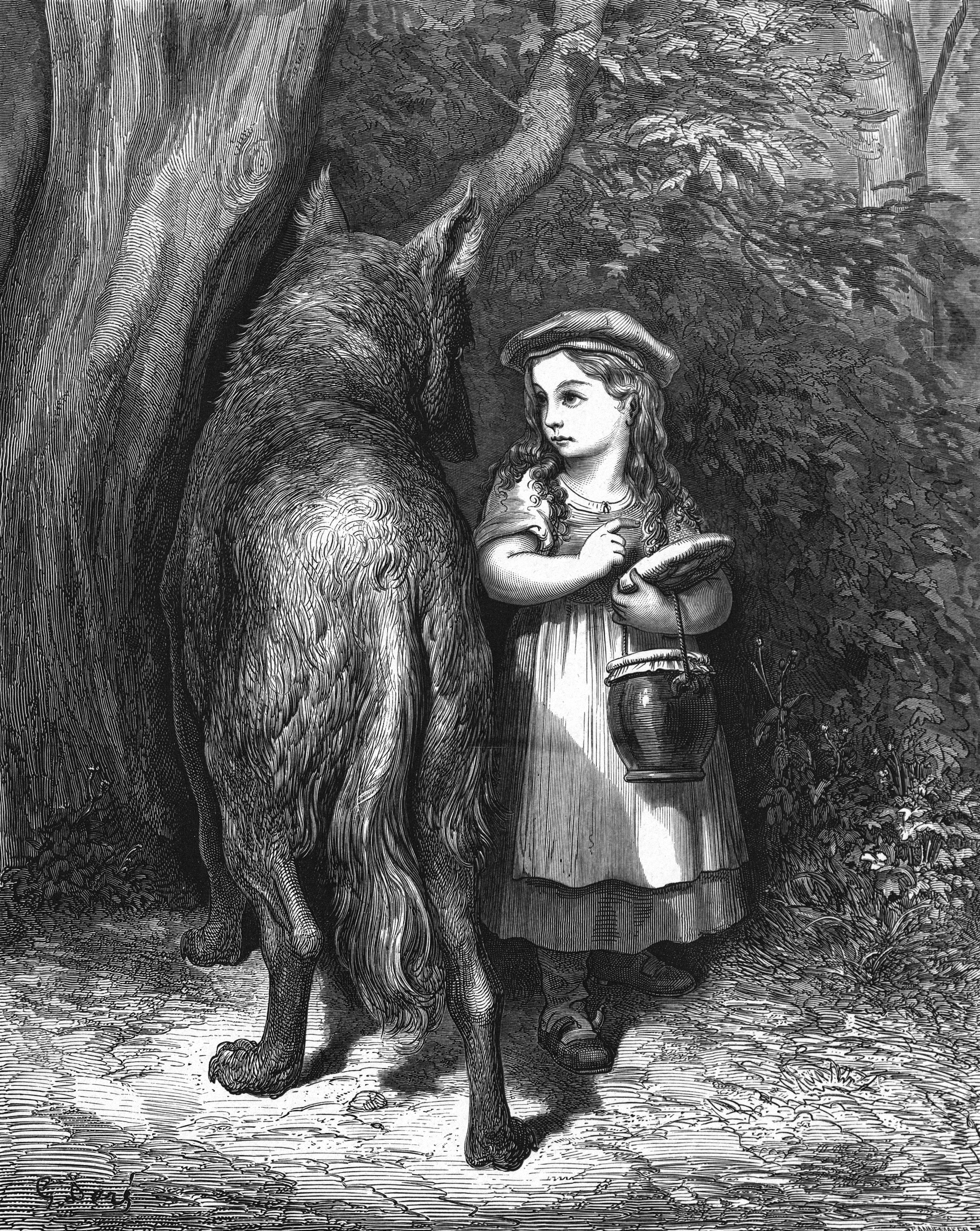
Little Red Riding Hood (1883), Gustave Doré

Isengrim the wolf, who appeared in the 12th-century Latin poem Ysengrimus, is a major character in the Reynard Cycle, where he is low nobility, contrasting with the peasant status of his adversary, Reynard the fox. Isengrim is forever the victim of Reynard's wit and cruelty, often dying by the end of each story. The folktale of "Little Red Riding Hood", first recorded in 1697 by Charles Perrault, is considered to have further contributed to the wolf's negative reputation in the Western world. The Big Bad Wolf is portrayed as a villain capable of imitating human speech and disguising itself with human clothing. Villainous wolf characters also appear in The Three Little Pigs and "The Wolf and the Seven Young Goats". The hunting of wolves, and their attacks on humans and livestock, feature prominently in Russian literature, and are included in the works of Leo Tolstoy, Anton Chekhov, Nikolay Nekrasov, Ivan Bunin, Leonid Pavlovich Sabaneyev, and others. Tolstoy's War and Peace and Chekhov's Peasants both feature scenes in which wolves are hunted with hounds and Borzois. The musical Peter and the Wolf involves a wolf being captured for eating a duck, but is spared and sent to a zoo.

Wolves are among the central characters of Rudyard Kipling's The Jungle Book. His portrayal of wolves has been praised posthumously by wolf biologists for his depiction of them: rather than being villainous or gluttonous, as was common in wolf portrayals at the time of the book's publication, they are shown as living in amiable family groups and drawing on the experience of infirm but experienced elder pack members. Farley Mowat's largely fictional 1963 memoir Never Cry Wolf has been labelled "the most popular book written on wolves", becoming a staple of school reading and adapted into a 1983 film. Although credited with having changed popular perceptions of wolves by portraying them positively, it has been criticized for its idealization of wolves and its factual inaccuracies.

=== Conflicts ===
Human presence appears to stress wolves, as seen by increased cortisol levels in instances such as snowmobiling near their territory.

==== Predation on livestock ====
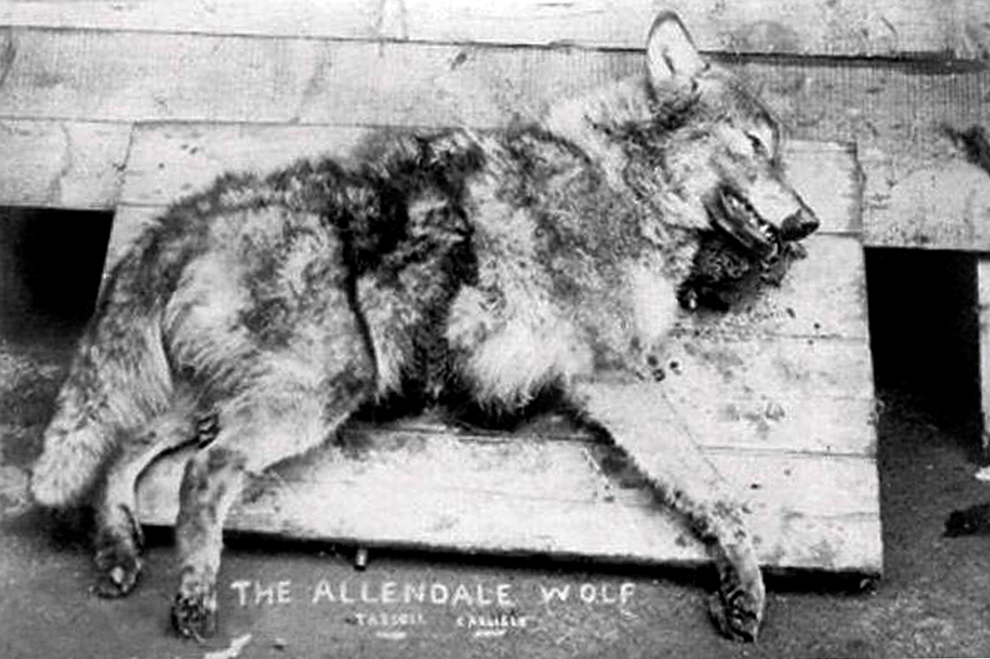
A 1905 postcard of the Hexham wolf, an escaped wolf shot for killing livestock in England

Livestock depredation has been one of the primary reasons for hunting wolves and can pose a severe problem for wolf conservation. As well as causing economic losses, the threat of wolf predation causes great stress on livestock producers, and no foolproof solution for preventing such attacks short of exterminating wolves has been found. Some nations help offset economic losses to wolves through compensation programs or state insurance. Domesticated animals are easy prey for wolves, as they have been bred under constant human protection and are thus unable to defend themselves very well. Wolves typically resort to attacking livestock when wild prey is depleted. In Eurasia, a large part of the diet of some wolf populations consists of livestock, while such incidents are rare in North America, where healthy populations of wild prey have been largely restored.

The majority of losses occur during the summer grazing period, with untended livestock in remote pastures being the most vulnerable to wolf predation. The most frequently targeted livestock species are sheep (Europe), domestic reindeer (northern Scandinavia), goats (India), horses (Mongolia), cattle and turkeys (North America). The number of animals killed in single attacks varies according to species: most attacks on cattle and horses result in one death, while turkeys, sheep and domestic reindeer may be killed in surplus. Wolves mainly attack livestock when the animals are grazing, though they occasionally break into fenced enclosures.

==== Competition with dogs ====
A review of the studies on the competitive effects of dogs on sympatric carnivores did not mention any research on competition between dogs and wolves. Competition would favour the wolf, which is known to kill dogs; however, wolves usually live in pairs or in small packs in areas with high human persecution, giving them a disadvantage when facing large groups of dogs.

Wolves kill dogs on occasion, and some wolf populations rely on dogs as an important food source. In Croatia, wolves kill more dogs than sheep, and in Russia, wolves appear to limit stray dog populations. Wolves may display unusually bold behaviour when attacking dogs accompanied by people, sometimes ignoring nearby humans. Wolf attacks on dogs may occur both in house yards and in forests. Wolf attacks on hunting dogs are considered a major problem in Scandinavia and Wisconsin. Although the number of dogs killed each year by wolves is relatively low, it induces a fear of wolves entering villages and farmyards to prey on them. In many cultures, dogs are seen as family members, or at least working team members, and losing one can lead to strong emotional responses such as demanding more liberal hunting regulations.

Dogs that are employed to guard sheep help to mitigate human–wolf conflicts, and are often proposed as one of the non-lethal tools in the conservation of wolves. Shepherd dogs are not particularly aggressive. Still, they can disrupt potential wolf predation by displaying what is to the wolf ambiguous behaviours, such as barking, social greeting, invitation to play or aggression. The historical use of shepherd dogs across Eurasia has been effective against wolf predation, especially when confining sheep in the presence of several livestock guardian dogs. Shepherd dogs are sometimes killed by wolves.

==== Attacks on humans ====
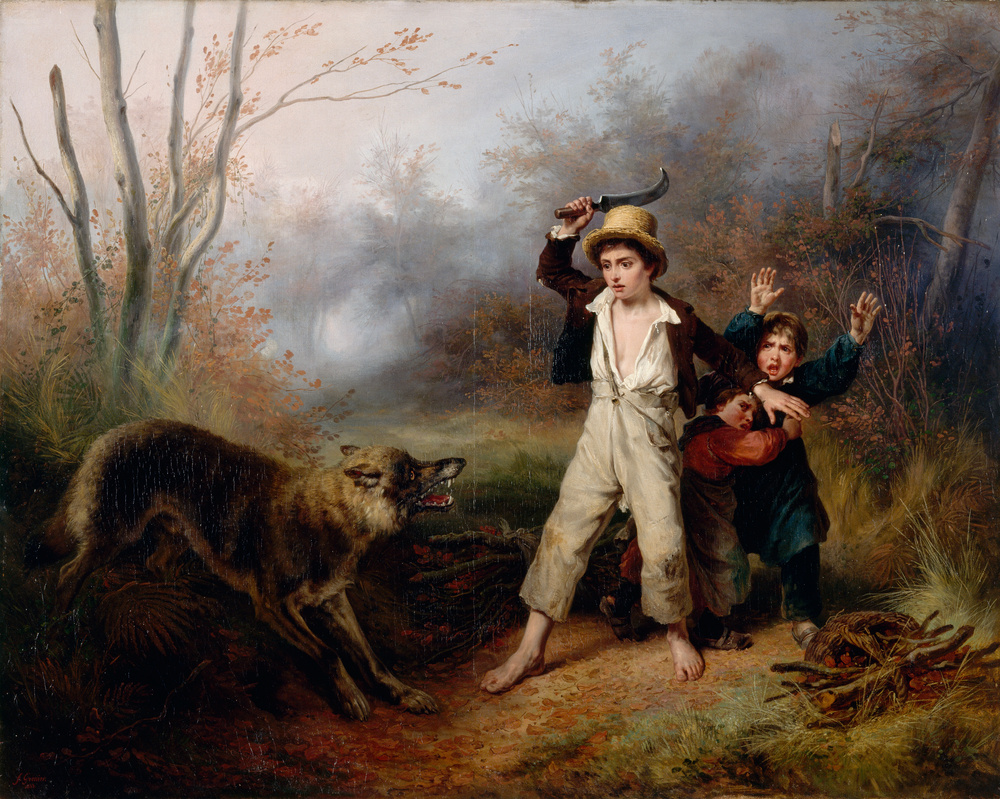
Country children surprised by a wolf (1833) by François Grenier de Saint-Martin

The fear of wolves has been pervasive in many societies, though humans are not part of the wolf's natural prey. How wolves react to humans depends largely on their prior experience with people: wolves lacking any negative experience of humans, or which are food-conditioned, may show little fear of people. Although wolves may react aggressively when provoked, such attacks are mostly limited to quick bites on extremities, and the attacks are not prolonged.

Predatory attacks may be preceded by a long period of habituation, in which wolves gradually lose their fear of humans. The victims are repeatedly bitten on the head and face, and are then dragged off and consumed unless the wolves are driven off. Such attacks typically occur only locally and do not stop until the wolves involved are eliminated. Predatory attacks can occur at any time of the year, with a peak in the June–August period, when the chances of people entering forested areas (for livestock grazing or berry and mushroom picking) increase. Cases of non-rabid wolf attacks in winter have been recorded in Belarus, Kirov and Irkutsk oblasts, Karelia and Ukraine. Also, wolves with pups experience greater food stress during this period. The majority of victims of predatory wolf attacks are children under the age of 18 and, in the rare cases where adults are killed, the victims are almost always women. Indian wolves have a history of preying on children, a phenomenon called "child-lifting". They may be taken primarily in the spring and summer periods during the evening hours, and often within human settlements.

Cases of rabid wolves are low when compared to other species, as wolves do not serve as primary reservoirs of the disease, but can be infected by animals such as dogs, jackals, and foxes. Incidents of rabies in wolves are very rare in North America, though numerous in the eastern Mediterranean, the Middle East and Central Asia. Wolves apparently develop the "furious" form of rabies to a very high degree. This, coupled with their size and strength, makes rabid wolves perhaps the most dangerous of rabid animals. Bites from rabid wolves are 15 times more dangerous than those of rabid dogs. Rabid wolves usually act alone, travelling large distances and often biting large numbers of people and domestic animals. Most rabid wolf attacks occur in the spring and autumn periods. Unlike predatory attacks, the victims of rabid wolves are not eaten, and the attacks generally occur only on a single day. The victims are chosen at random, though most cases involve adult men. During the fifty years up to 2002, there were eight fatal attacks in Europe and Russia, and more than two hundred in southern Asia.

==== Human hunting of wolves ====
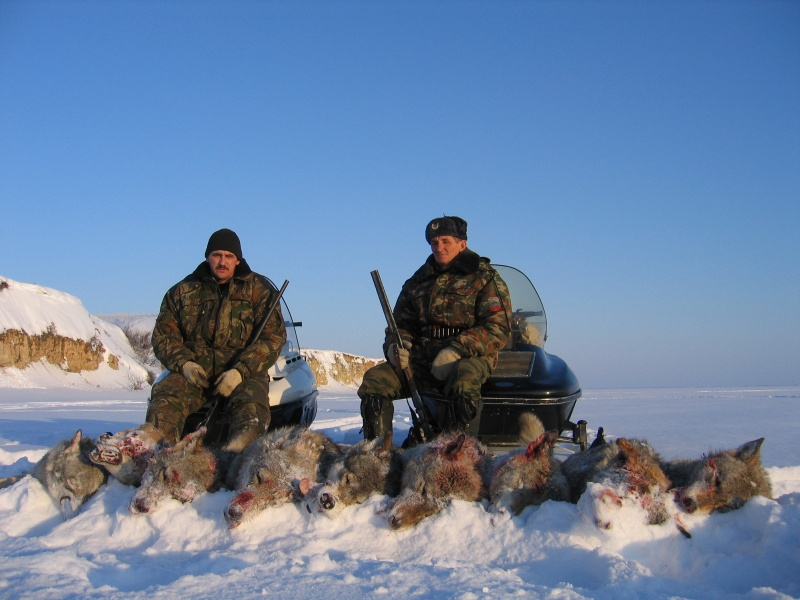
Carcasses of hunted wolves in Volgograd Oblast, Russia

Theodore Roosevelt said wolves are difficult to hunt because of their elusiveness, sharp senses, high endurance, and ability to incapacitate and kill hunting dogs quickly. Historic methods included killing of spring-born litters in their dens, coursing with dogs (usually combinations of sighthounds, Bloodhounds and Fox Terriers), poisoning with strychnine, and trapping.

A popular method of wolf hunting in Russia involves trapping a pack within a small area by encircling it with fladry poles carrying a human scent. This method relies heavily on the wolf's fear of human scents, though it can lose its effectiveness when wolves become accustomed to the odor. Some hunters can lure wolves by imitating their calls. In Kazakhstan and Mongolia, wolves are traditionally hunted using eagles and large falcons. However, this practice is declining, as experienced falconers are becoming few in number. Shooting wolves from aircraft is highly effective, due to increased visibility and direct lines of fire. Several types of dog, including the Borzoi and Kyrgyz Tajgan, have been specifically bred for wolf hunting.

=== Wolves as pets and working animals ===
While wolves and wolf-dog hybrids are sometimes kept as exotic pets, wolves do not show the same tractability as dogs in living alongside humans, being generally less responsive to human commands and more likely to act aggressively. Humans are more likely to be fatally mauled by a pet wolf or wolf-dog hybrid than by a dog.

== Bibliography ==
- Busch, R. H. (2007). Wolf Almanac, New and Revised: A Celebration Of Wolves And Their World (3 ed.). Rowman & Littlefield. ISBN 978-1-59921-069-8.
- Graves, Will (2007). Wolves in Russia: Anxiety throughout the ages. Detselig Enterprises. ISBN 978-1-55059-332-7.
- Heptner, V. G.; Naumov, N. P. (1998). Mammals of the Soviet Union Vol. II Part 1a, Sirenia and Carnivora (Sea cows; Wolves and Bears). Science Publishers, Inc. USA. ISBN 978-1-886106-81-9.
- Lopez, Barry H. (1978). Of Wolves and Men. J. M. Dent and Sons Limited. ISBN 978-0-7432-4936-2.
- Marvin, Garry (2012). Wolf. Reaktion Books Ltd. ISBN 978-1-86189-879-1.
- Mech, L. David (1981). The Wolf: The Ecology and Behaviour of an Endangered Species. University of Minnesota Press. ISBN 978-0-8166-1026-6.
- Mech, L. David; Boitani, Luigi, eds. (2003). Wolves: Behaviour, Ecology and Conservation. University of Chicago Press. ISBN 978-0-226-51696-7.
- Mech, L. David; Smith, Douglas W.; MacNulty, Daniel R. (2015). Wolves on the Hunt: The Behavior of Wolves Hunting Wild Prey. University of Chicago Press. ISBN 978-0-226-25514-9.
