= Hexham Heads =

Small stone heads found in England

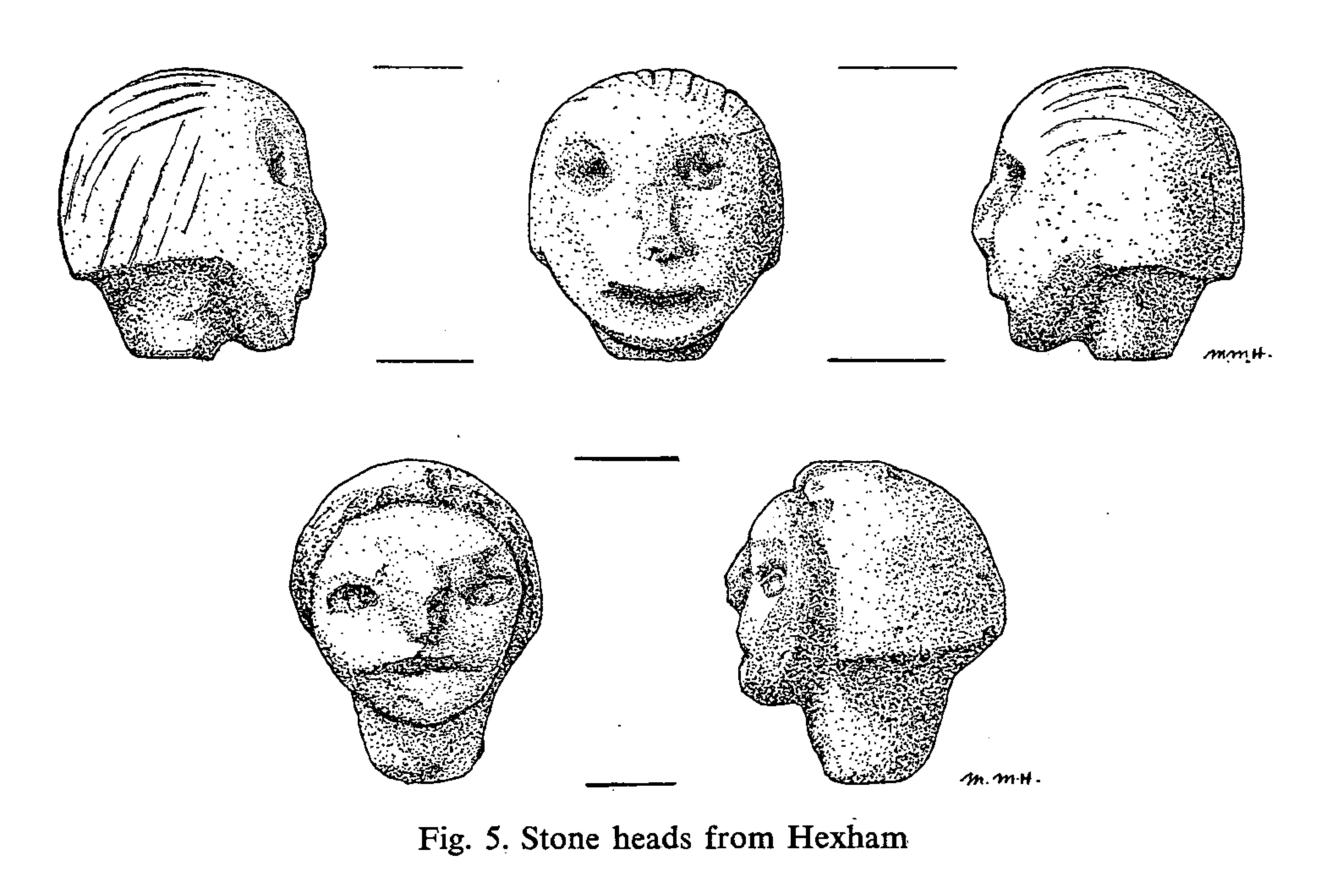
The Hexham Heads. Drawn by Mary Hurrell for Anne Ross's 1973 paper.

The Hexham Heads were a pair of small stone heads, about 6 cm (2.4 in) high, found in 1971 in the English town of Hexham. The heads became associated with alleged paranormal phenomena, and their exact origin is a point of controversy.

== History ==
The heads were originally dug up by two boys, Colin and Leslie Robson, who found them in the garden in 1971; a number of sources incorrectly give the year as 1972. After the discovery, the Robson family reported strange phenomena, with the heads allegedly being moved when no one was in the room and bottles being mysteriously thrown across rooms. The Dodd family next door also reported phenomena, with one boy's hair pulled in the night and his mother Nelly seeing a half-man, half-goat figure leaving the house shortly afterwards.

The heads were subsequently given to Anne Ross, an expert in Celtic artefacts. The human head, according to Ross, was "venerated as a symbol of divinity and the powers of the otherworld...the very seat of the soul" in Ancient Celtic religion, and other Celtic head figurines have also been found (often near water which also held significance in Celtic animism). While storing the heads in her home, Ross described waking up one morning and seeing a part-wolf, part-man figure walking out of the room, which she followed downstairs and saw heading toward the direction of the kitchen before losing sight of it. A few days later, her daughter, Berenice, told her that, after returning home from school, she saw a large, dark, werewolf-like figure on the stairs that jumped over the banisters and into a corridor before vanishing. The wolf was believed to have some relation to the Hexham wolf that killed livestock in the winter of 1904. Ross also reported the feeling of a cold presence, her study door bursting open with no apparent cause and another apparent sighting of a dark figure. Knowing of Nelly Dodd's experience, Ross equated all of these phenomena with the Hexham Heads and the incidents allegedly stopped when she moved the two Celtic heads in her possession out of the house.

A man named Desmond Craigie reported that he was the creator of the heads, making them in 1956 for his daughter while he was living in the house later occupied by the Robson family, along with a third head which became damaged and had to be thrown away. Craigie, who worked for a company that dealt in concrete at the time he allegedly created the heads, made some replicas to demonstrate his claim; however, these replicas were not satisfactorily similar to the original heads. The original heads were analyzed by Professor Dearman of the University of Newcastle, who concluded that the items had been moulded artificially rather than carved.

The original heads were later given to another man, but he and the heads vanished and their whereabouts are still unknown.

== Legacy ==
In October 2024 BBC Archives announced that it had been able to restore an interview with Anne Ross on the Hexham Heads that had been broadcast on Nationwide in 1976. The interview incorporated a clip of Oliver Reed from the Hammer film The Curse of the Werewolf, which according to the BBC "seared the report in the memories of many of those watching".

== See also ==
- Bélmez Faces
- Hexham wolf
