= Dog coat =

Hair that covers a dogs body

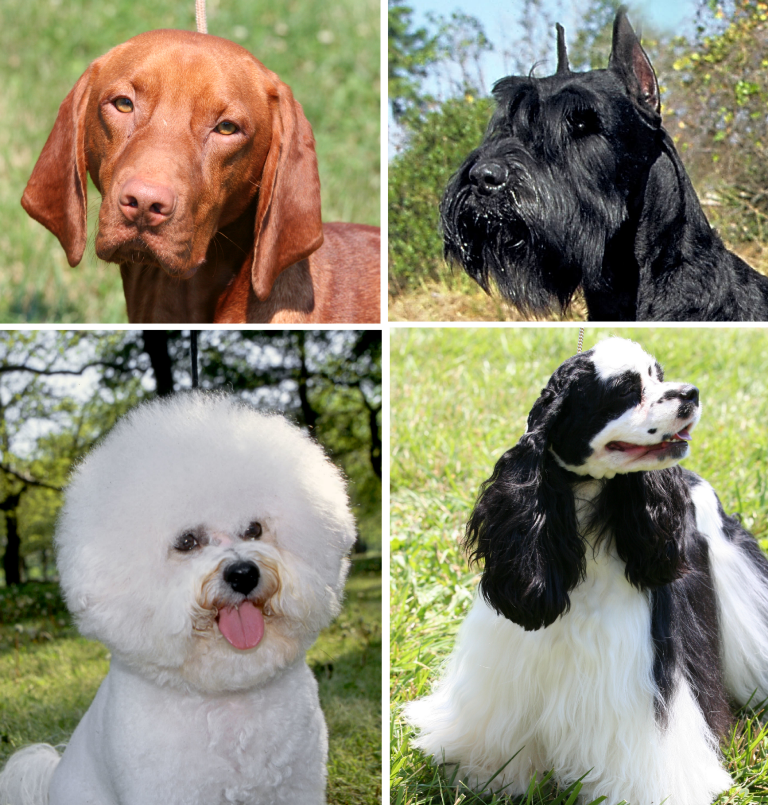
Coat variation of the dog

The coat of the domestic dog refers to the hair that covers its body. Dogs demonstrate a wide range of coat colors, patterns, textures, and lengths.

As with other mammals, a dog's fur has many uses, including thermoregulation and protection from cuts or scratches; furthermore, a dog's coat plays an important role in the showing of purebred dogs. Breed standards often include a detailed description of the nature and attributes of that breed's ideal coat.

A dog's coat is composed of two layers: a top coat of stiff guard hairs that help repel water and shield from dirt, and an undercoat of soft down hairs, to serve as insulation. Dogs with both under coat and top coat are said to have a double coat. Dogs with a single coat have a coat composed solely of guard hairs, with little or no downy undercoat.

The terms fur and hair are often used interchangeably when describing a dog's coat, however in general, a double coat, like that of the Newfoundland and most livestock guardian dogs, is referred to as a fur coat, while a single coat, like that of the Poodle, is referred to as a hair coat.

== Genetics ==
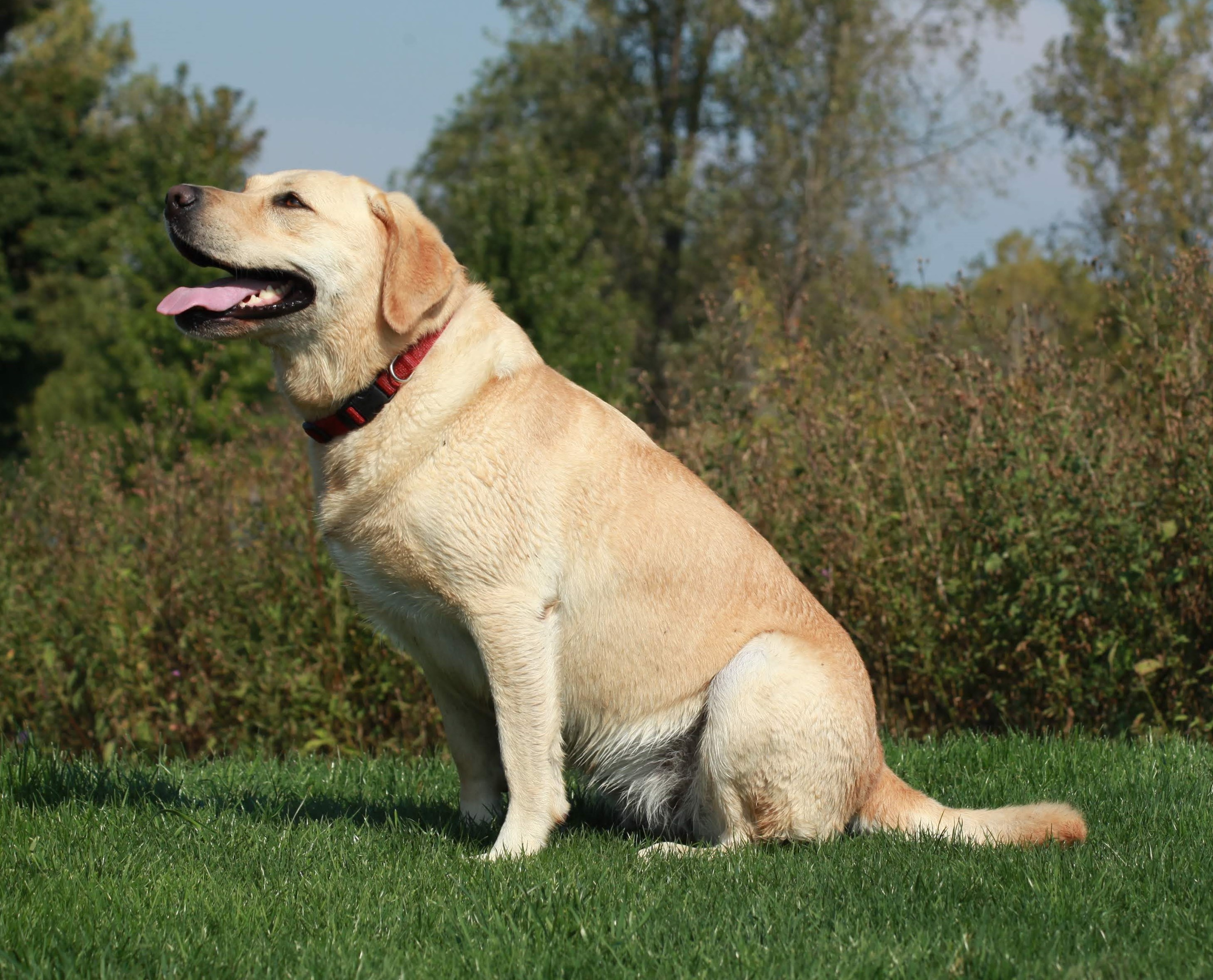
A Labrador exhibiting a yellow coat colour

Domestic dogs exhibit diverse coat colours and patterns. In many mammals, different colour patterns are the result of the regulation of the Agouti gene, which can cause hair follicles to switch from making black or brown pigments to yellow or nearly white pigments. The most common coat pattern found in modern wolves is agouti, in which the upperside of the body has banded hairs and the underside exhibits lighter shading. The colour yellow is dominant to the colour black and is found in dogs across much of the world and the dingo in Australia.

In 2021, a study of whole genome sequences taken from dogs and wolves focused on the genetic relationships between them based on coat colour. The study found that most dog colour haplotypes were similar to most wolf haplotypes, however dominant yellow in dogs was closely related to white in arctic wolves from North America. This result suggests a common origin for dominant yellow in dogs and white in wolves but without recent gene flow, because this clade was found to be genetically basal to the golden jackal and genetically distinct from all other canids. The most recent common ancestor of the golden jackal and the wolf lineage dates back to 2 million years ago. The study proposes that 35,000 years ago there was genetic introgression into the Late Pleistocene grey wolf from a ghost population of an extinct canid which had diverged from the grey wolf lineage over 2 million years ago. This colour diversity could be found 35,000 years ago in wolves and 9,500 years ago in dogs. A closely related haplotype exists among those wolves of Tibet which possess yellow shading in their coats. The study explains the colour relationships between modern dogs and wolves, white wolves from North America, yellow dogs, and yellowish wolves from Tibet. The study concludes that during the Late Pleistocene, natural selection laid the genetic foundation for modern coat colour diversity in dogs and wolves.

During evolution of the dog from their wolf ancestors, coat colors in dogs were probably the inadvertent outcome of some other selective process, and were not likely initially selected for intentionally by humans. Research has found that tameness brings associated physical changes, including coat colouring and patterning.

Domestic dogs often display the remnants of countershading, a common natural camouflage pattern. The basic principle of countershading is when the animal is lit from above, shadows will be cast on the ventral side of the body. These shadows could provide a predator or prey with visual cues relating to the movement of the animal. By being lighter colored on the ventral side of the body, an animal can counteract this, and thereby fool the predator or prey. An alternative explanation is that the dorsal and ventral sides of an animal experience different selection pressures (from the need to blend into different backgrounds when viewed from above and below) resulting in differing coloration.

== Nomenclature of colours and patterns ==
=== Colors ===
The same colour may be referred to differently in different breeds. Likewise, a same term may mean different colourations in different breeds.

==== Brown, chocolate, liver ====
Brown, chocolate and liver are the most common terms used to refer to the bb-dilution of black pigment to a dark brown. Depending on breed and exact shade, terms such as mahogany, midtone brown, grey-brown, blackish brown are used. Sedge and deadgrass are used to describe the desired Chesapeake Bay Retriever color that resembles "that of its working surroundings" as closely as possible.

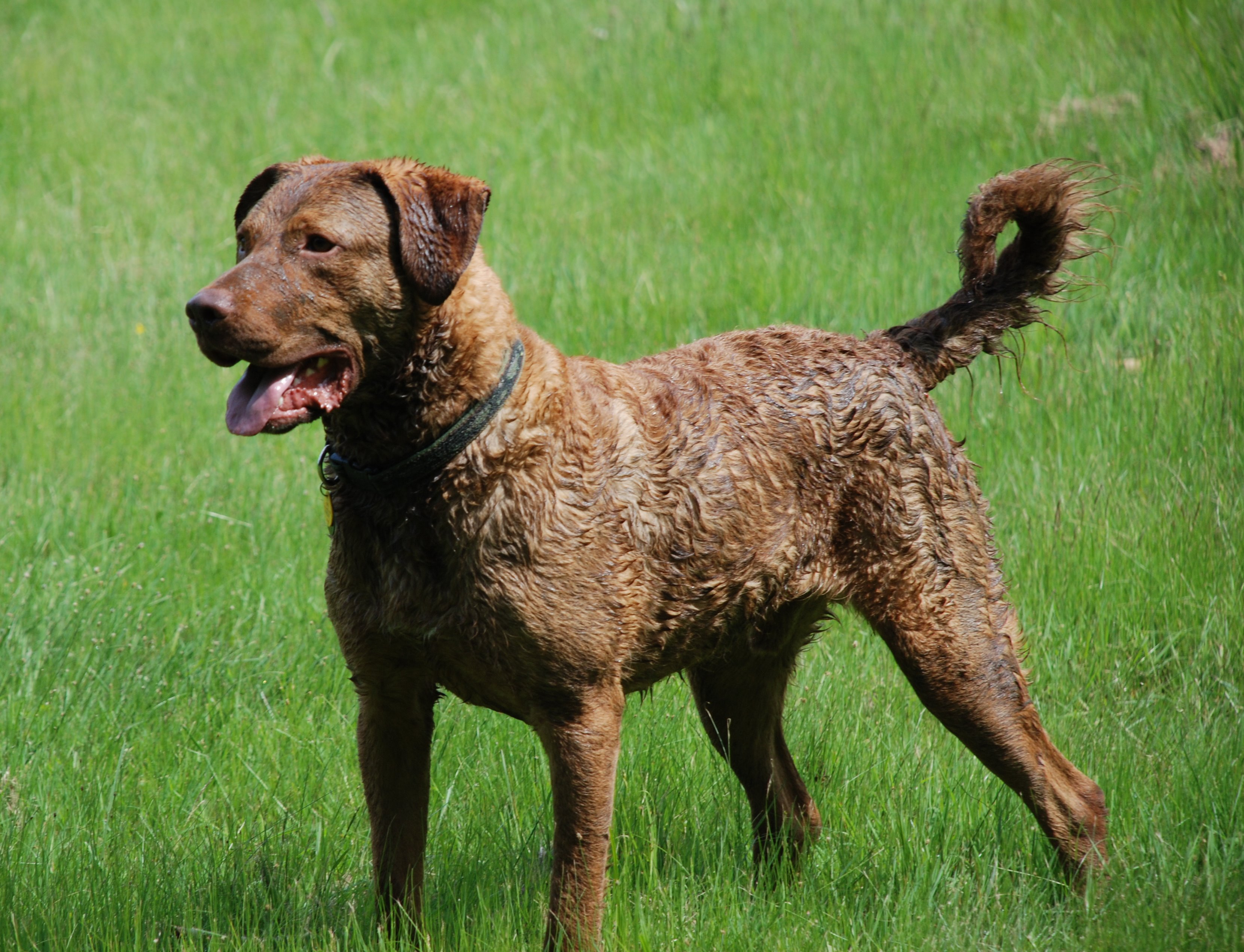
Brown Chesapeake Bay Retriever

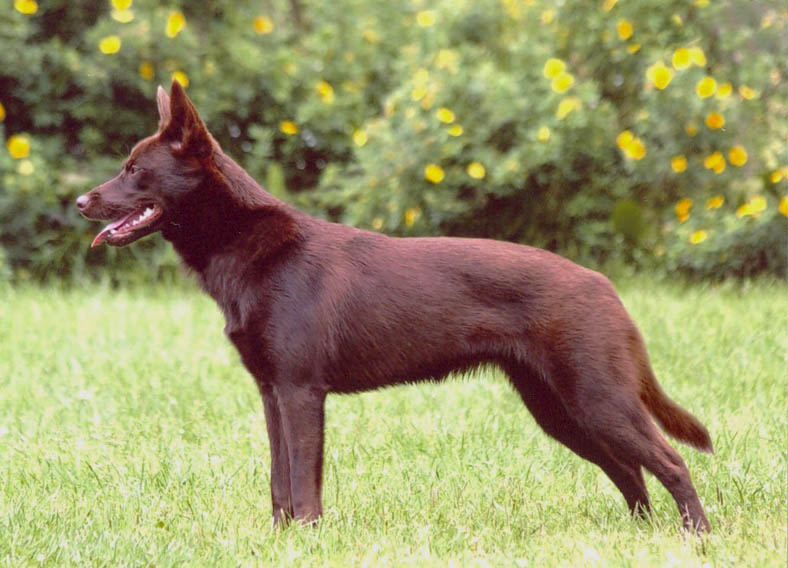
Red Australian Kelpie

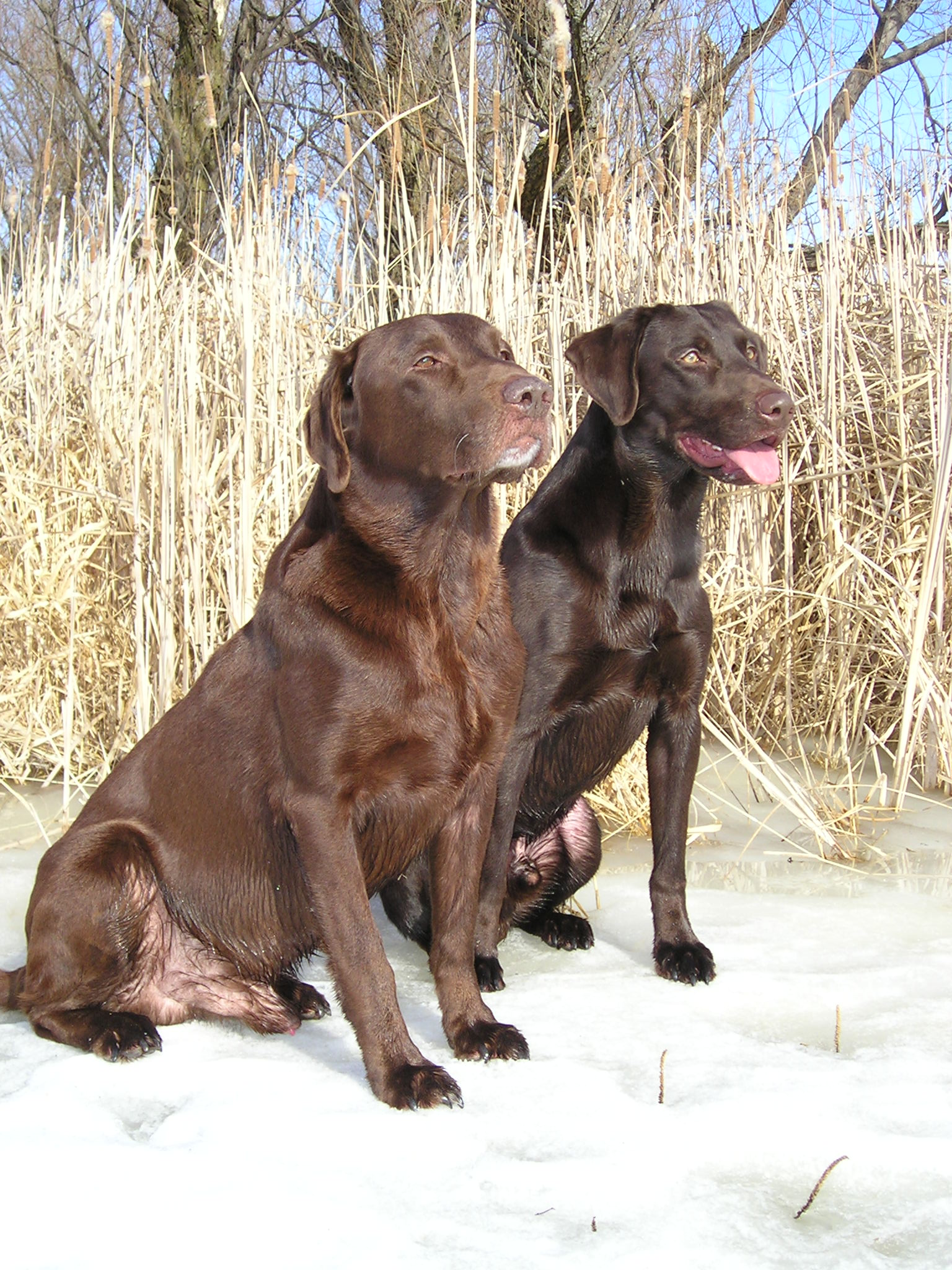
Dark and light chocolate Labrador Retrievers

==== Red ====
Red refers to reddish shades of orange, brown, and tan. Terms used include orange, red-gold, cinnamon, tan, and ruby. Genetically a dog called red is usually a clear sable (with little to no eumelanin tipping on hairs) or a ruddy recessive yellow.

In some breeds, "red" refers to what would usually be called brown, chocolate, or liver. A "red merle" is always a liver-based merle. In Australian Cattle Dogs, "red" stands for a densely ticked liver-based colouration with an overall red-grey appearance.

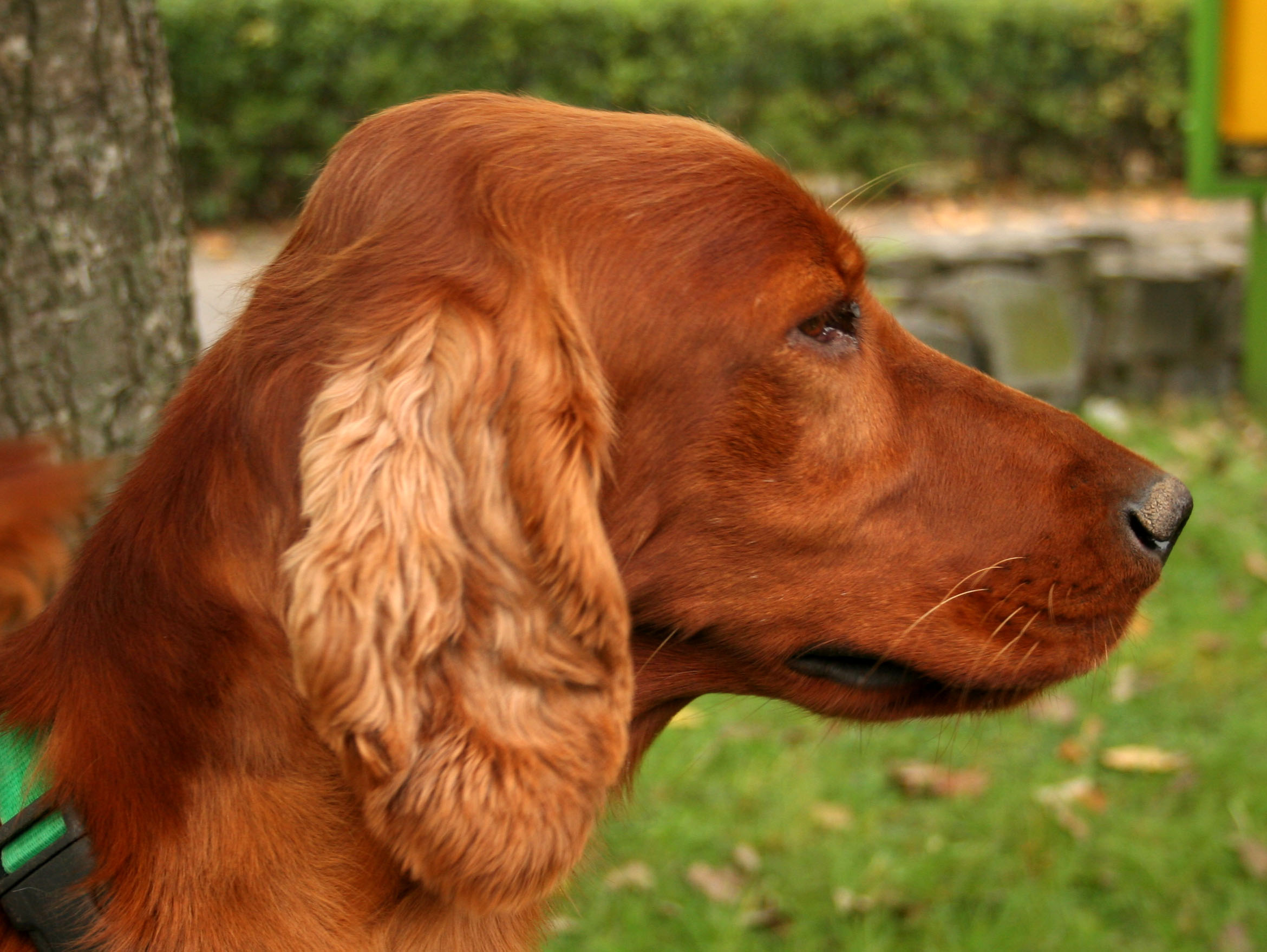
Red Irish Setter

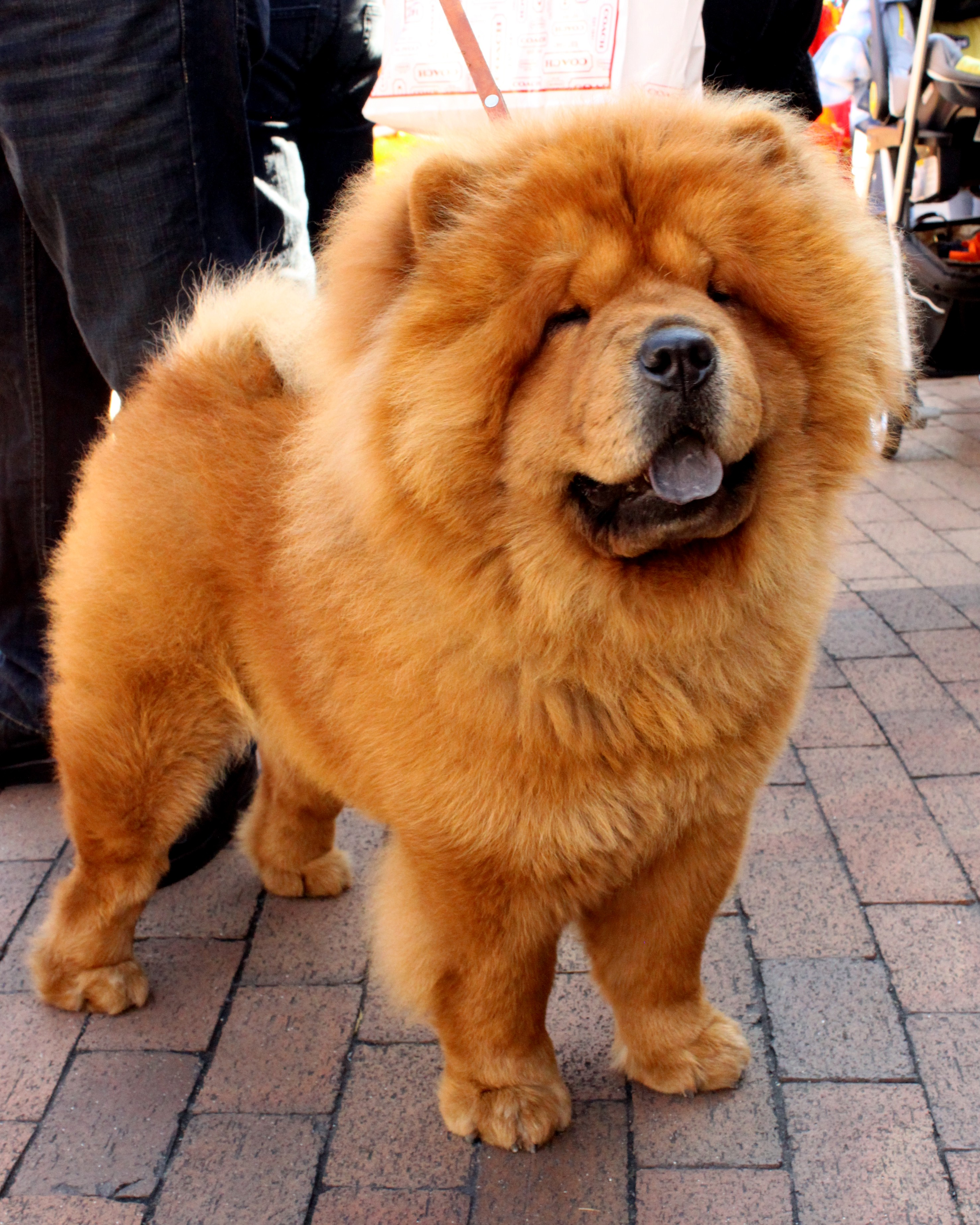
Red Chow Chow

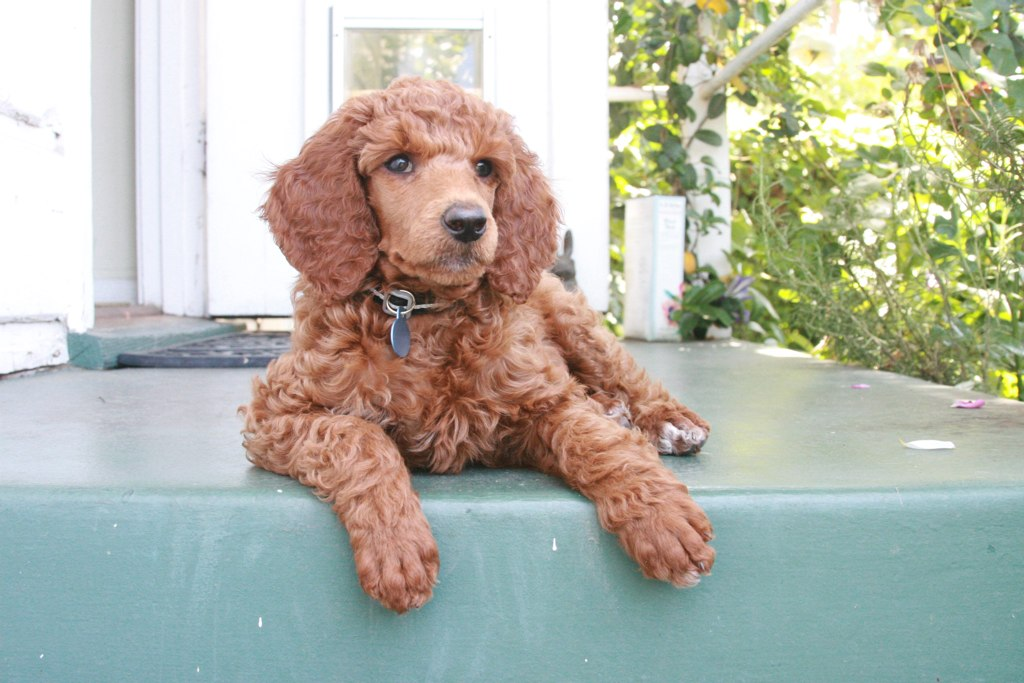
Red Standard Poodle

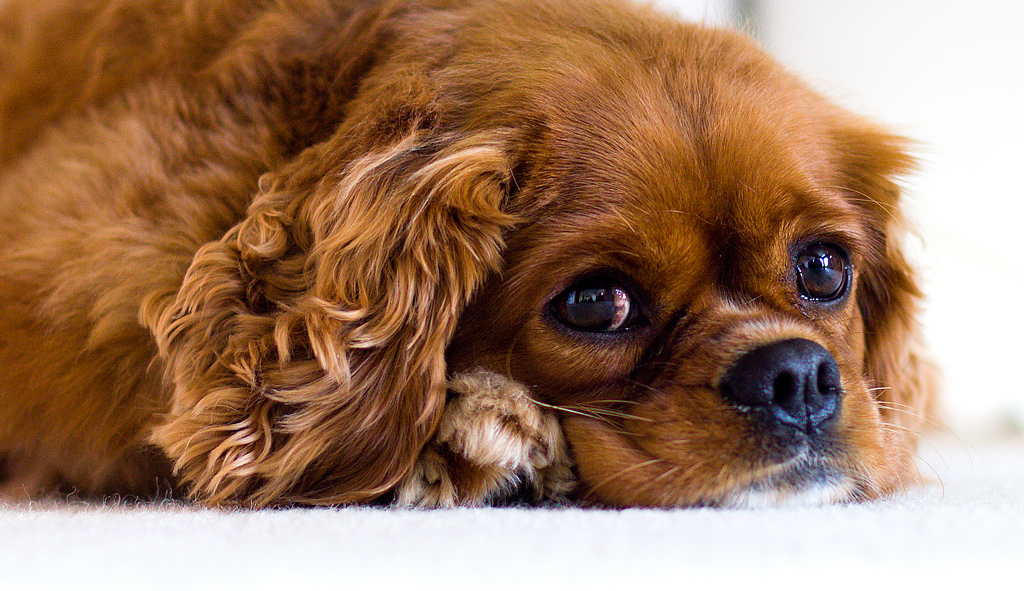
Ruby Cavalier King Charles Spaniel

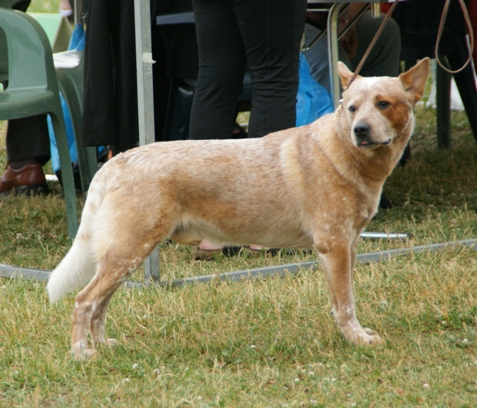
Red Australian Cattle Dog

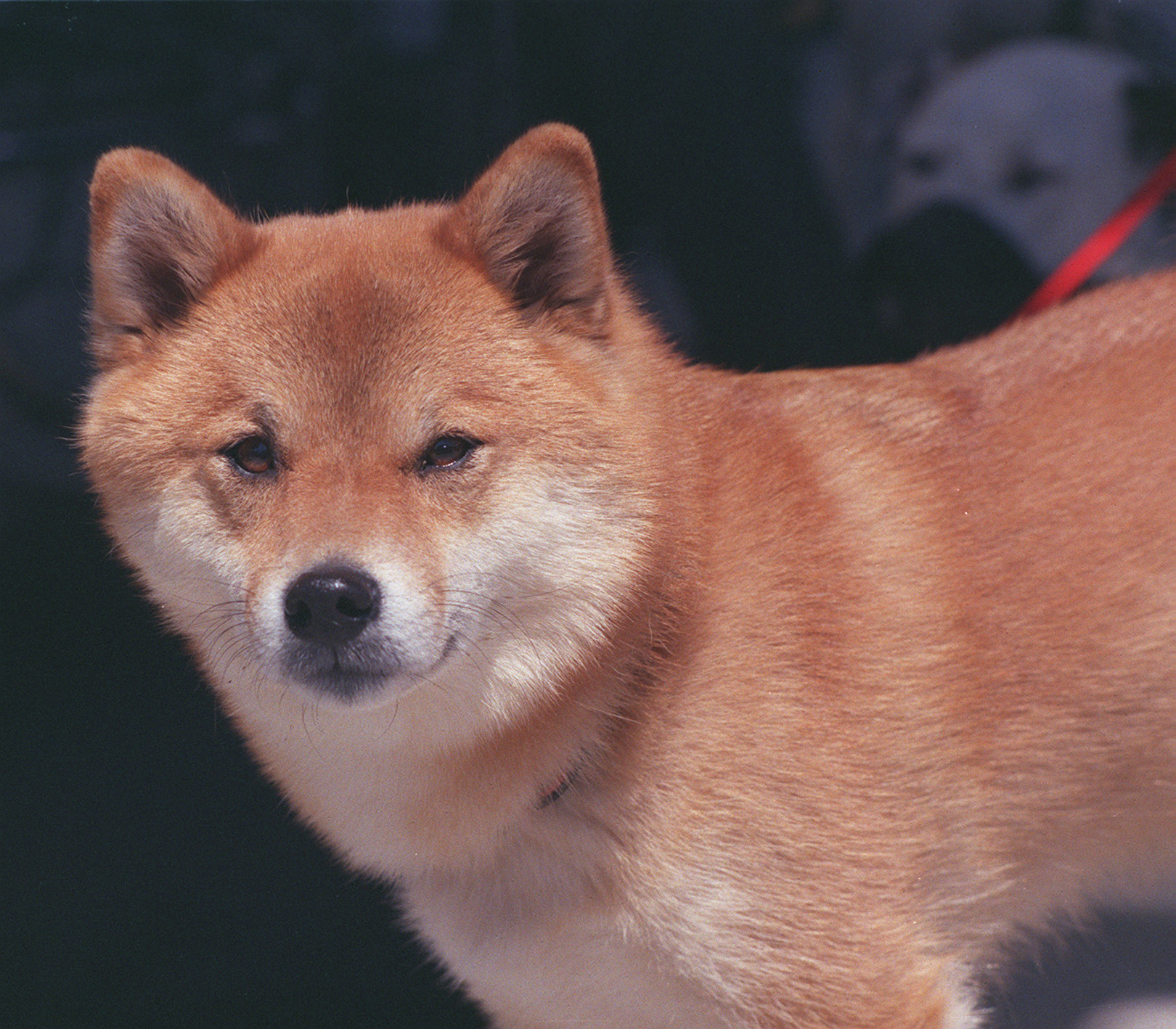
Red Shiba Inu

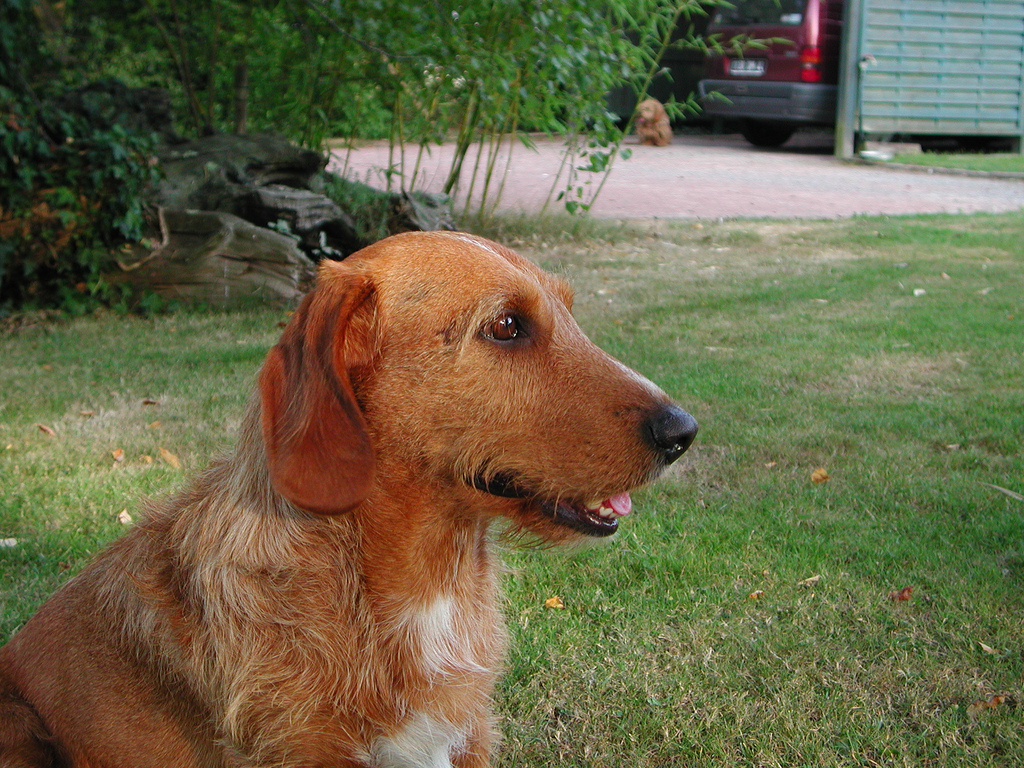
Red Basset Fauve de Bretagne

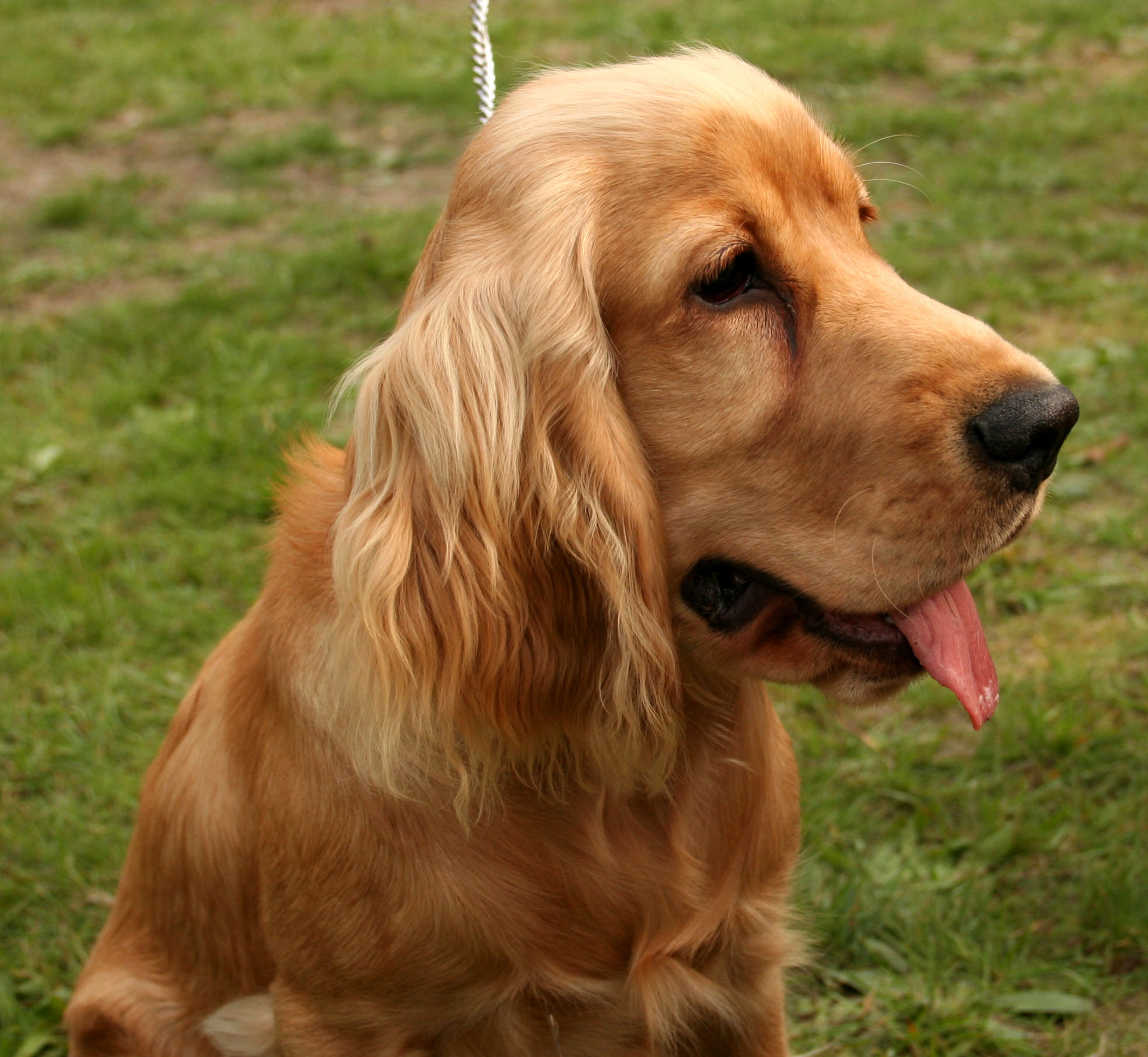
Red Cocker Spaniel

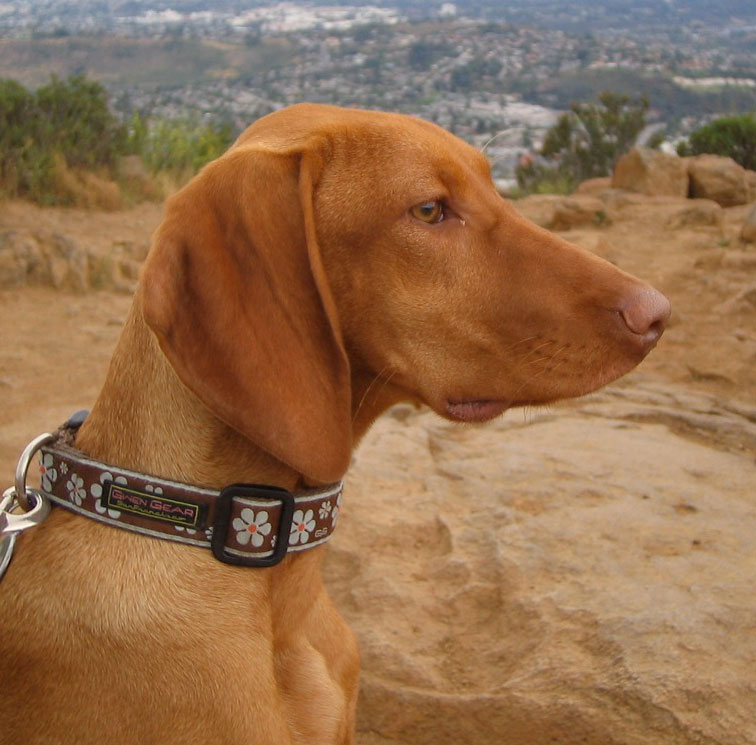
Vizsla

==== Gold and yellow ====
Gold refers specifically to a rich reddish-yellow and its variants, whereas yellow can refer to any shade of yellow and tan. Terms used include yellow-gold, lion-colored, fawn, apricot, wheaten, tawny, straw, yellow-red, mustard, sandy, honey, blond, and lemon. Dogs called golden or yellow tend to be recessive yellow, but can also be sable.

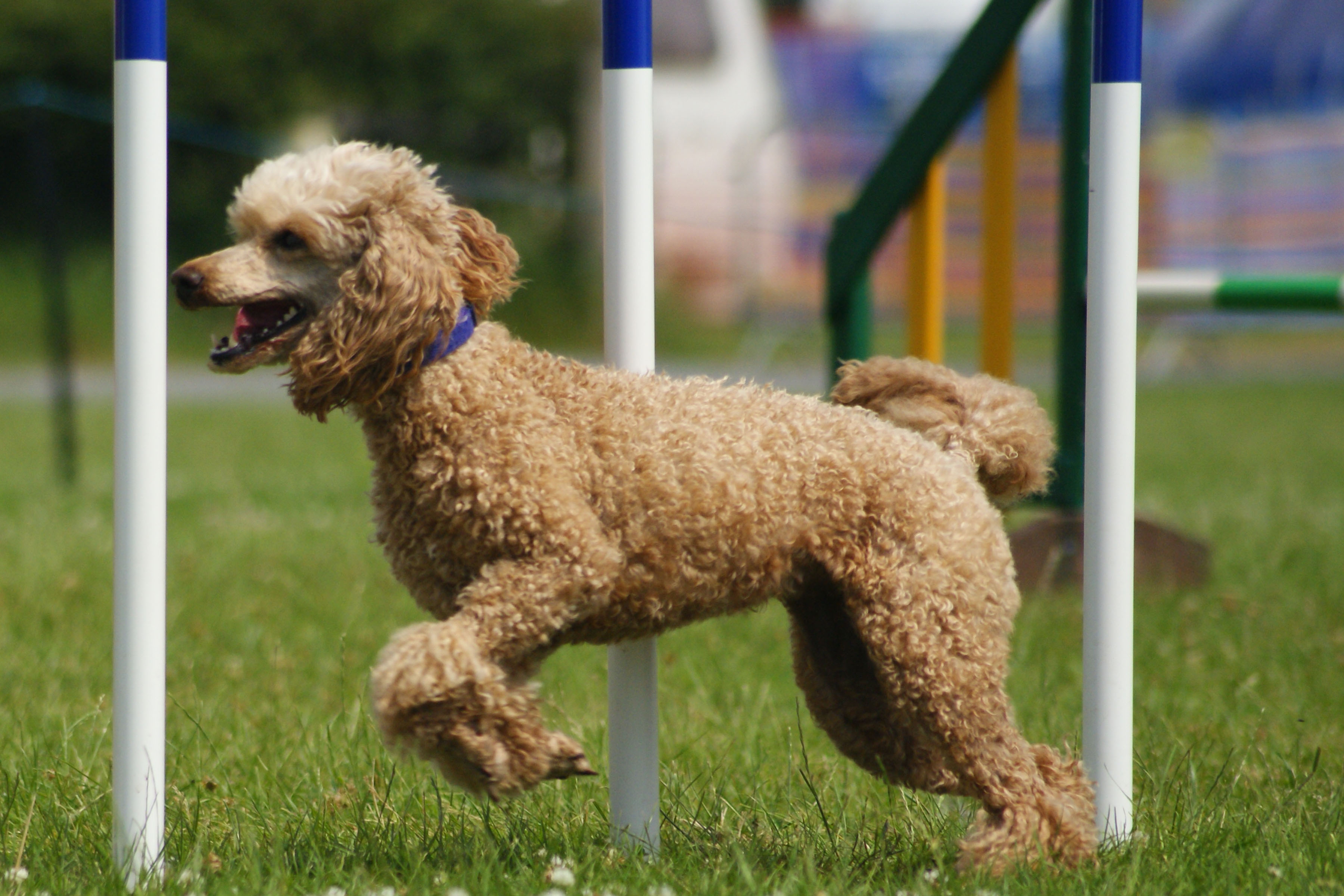
Apricot Poodle

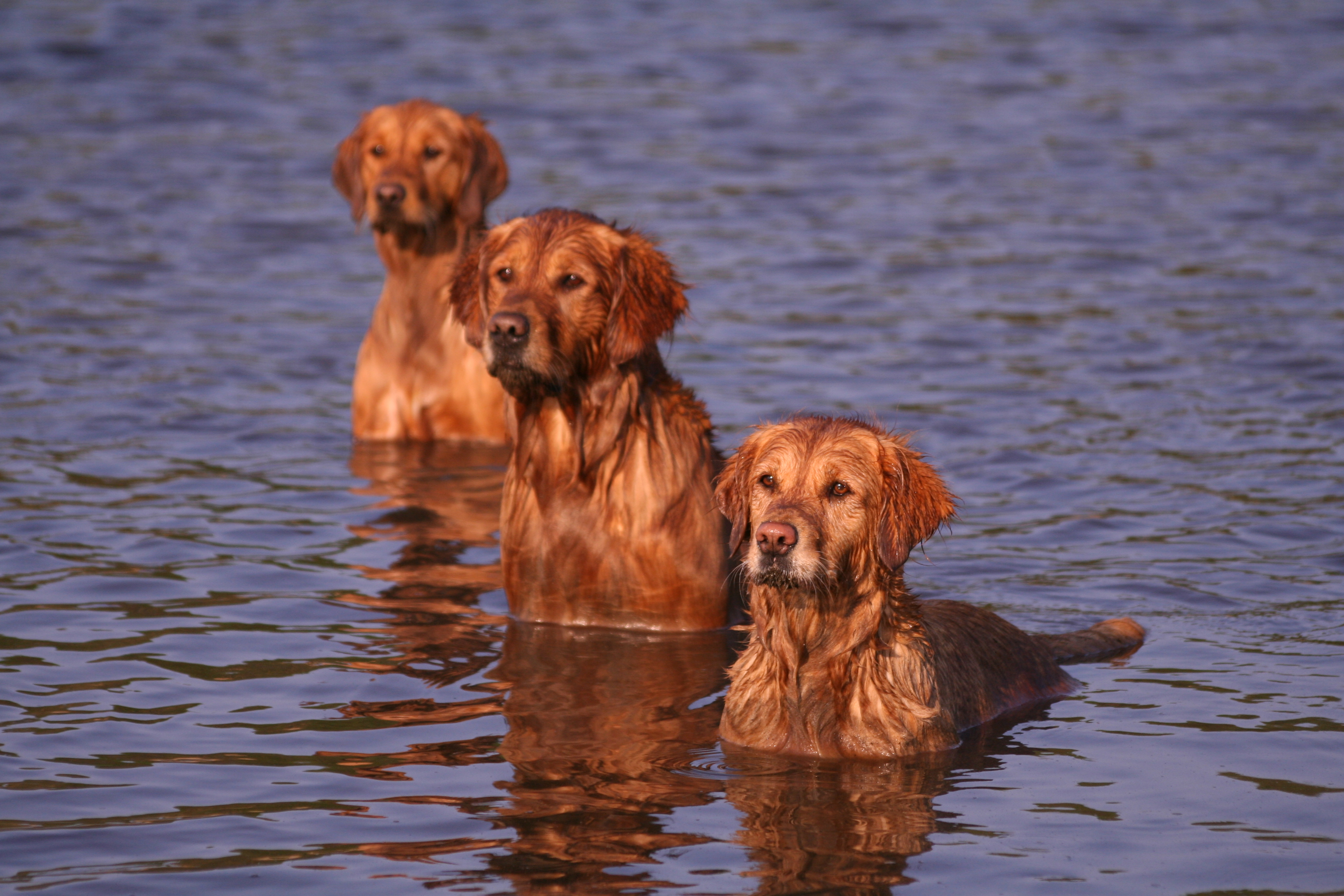
Dark Golden Retrievers

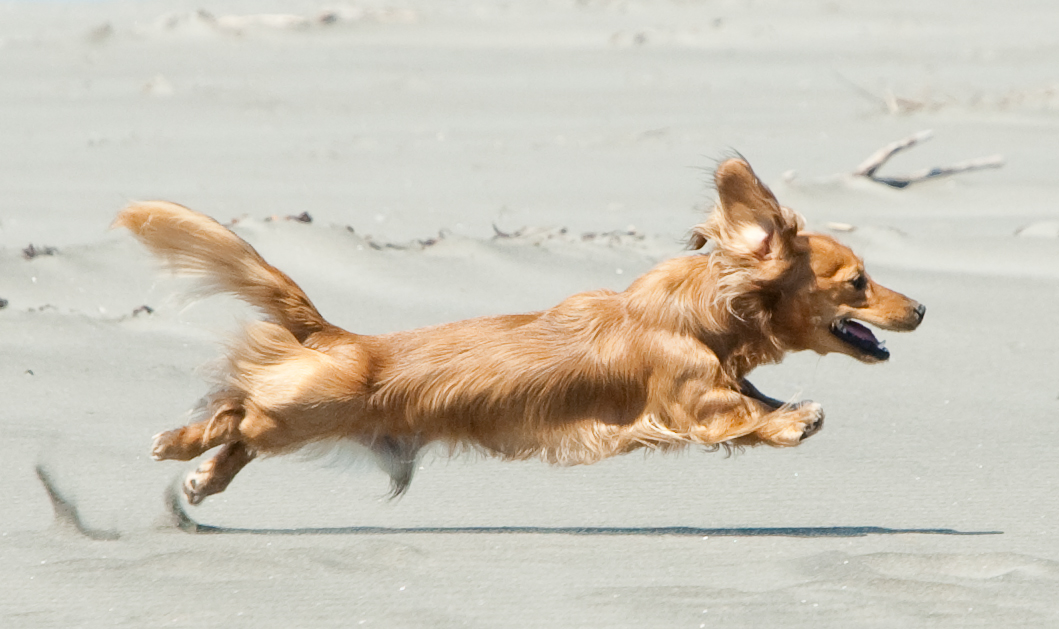
Yellow Dachshund

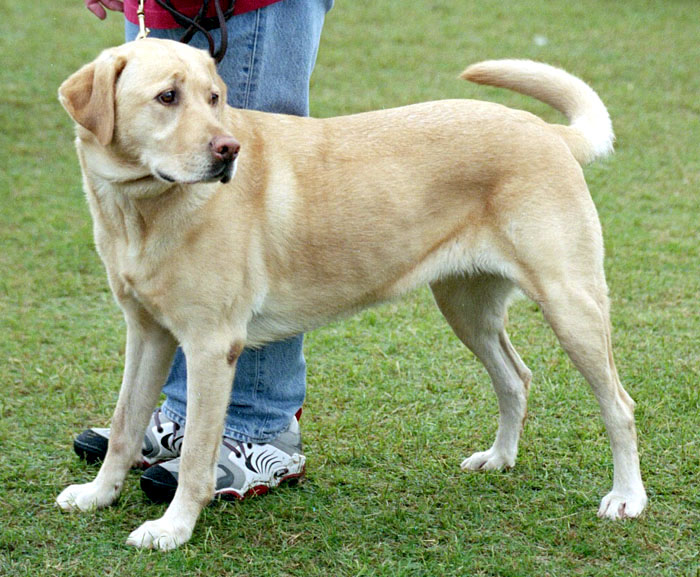
Yellow Labrador Retriever

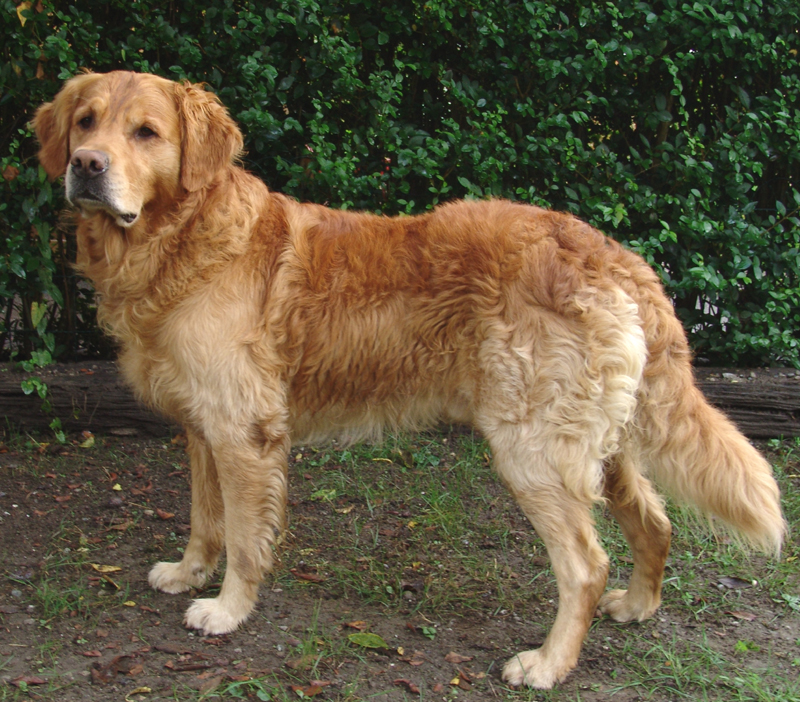
Dark Golden Golden Retriever

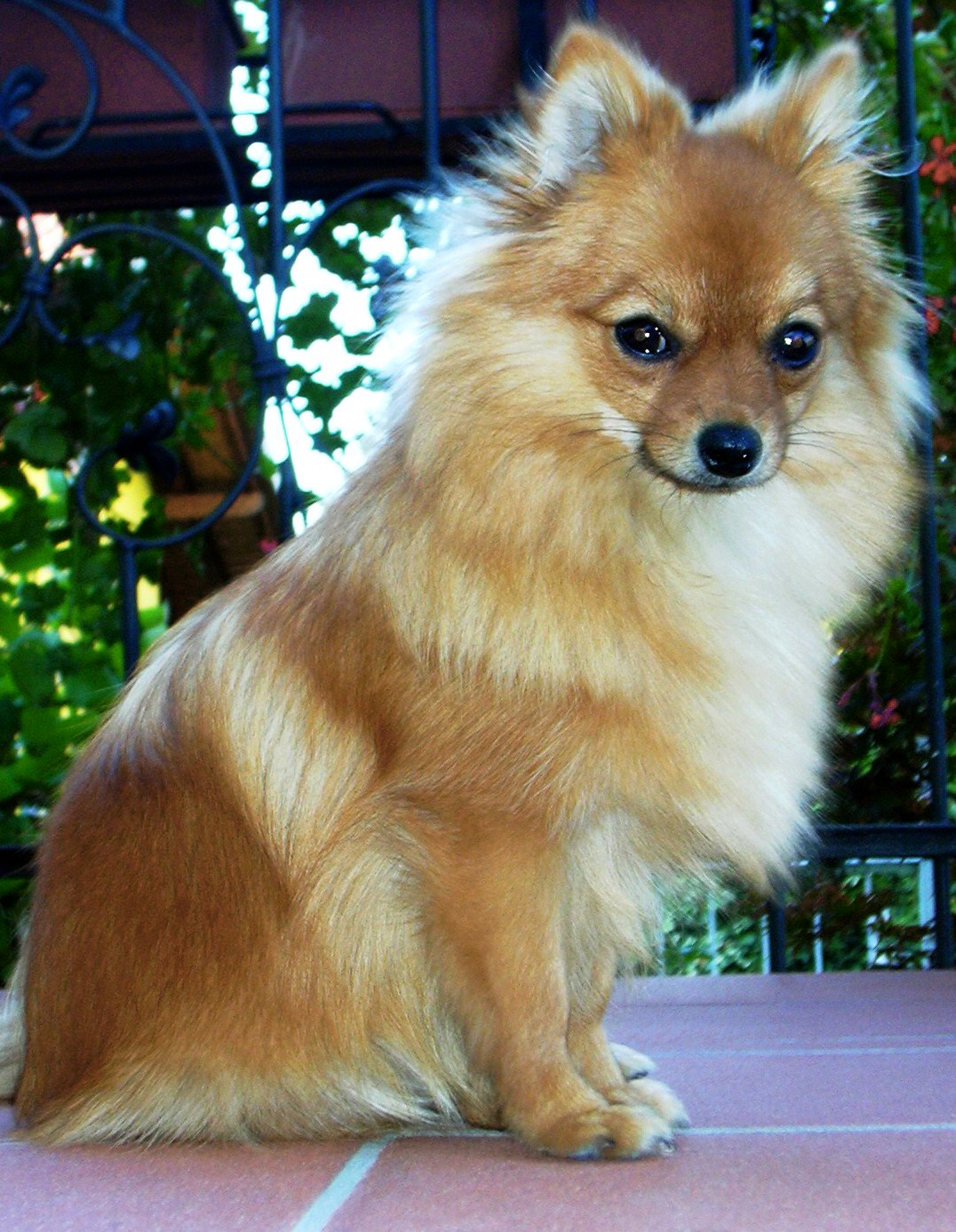
Orange Pomeranian (dog)

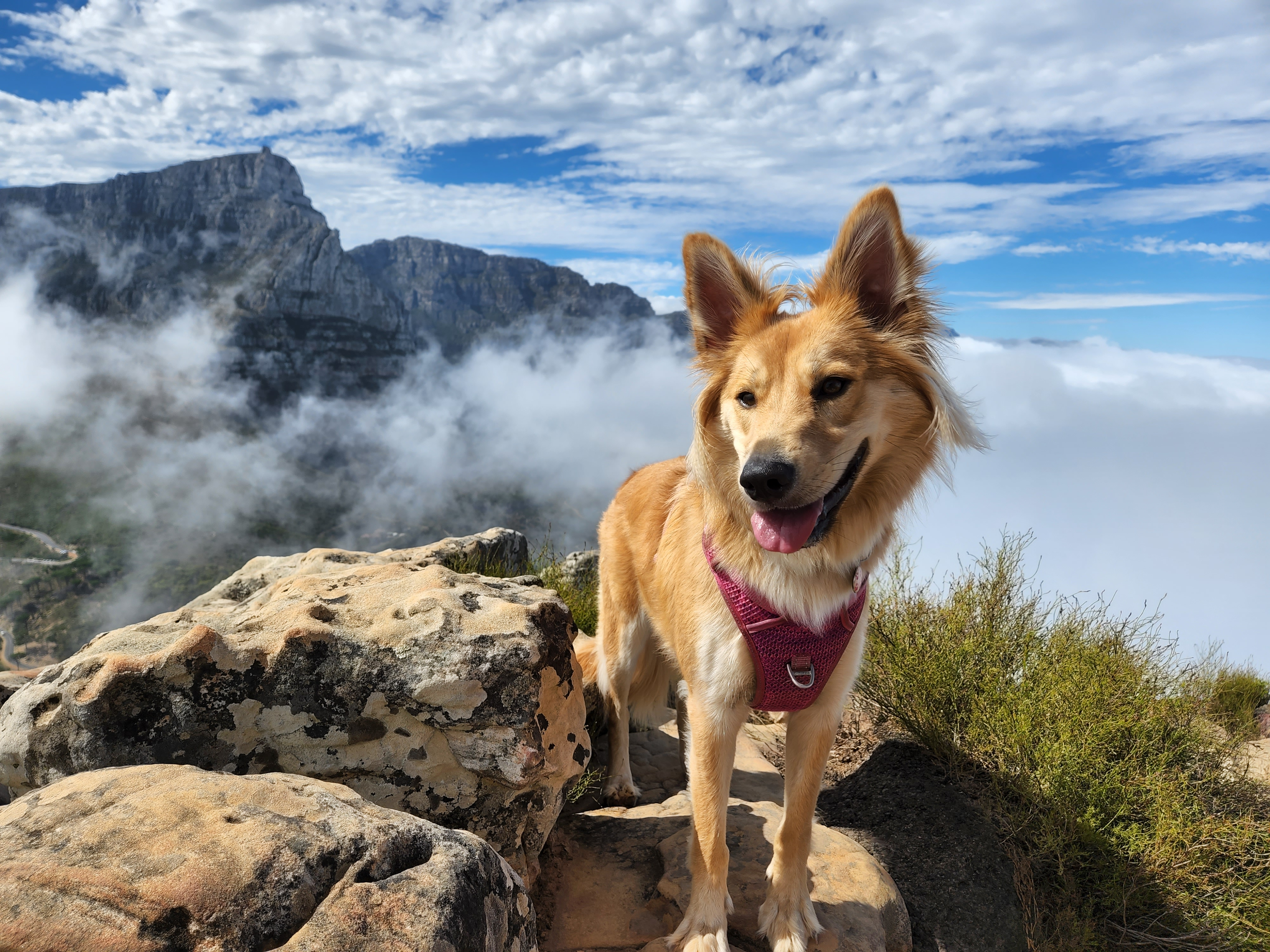
Yellow mixed breed of unknown parentage

==== Cream ====
Cream refers to a pale yellowish or tannish colour which can be almost white.

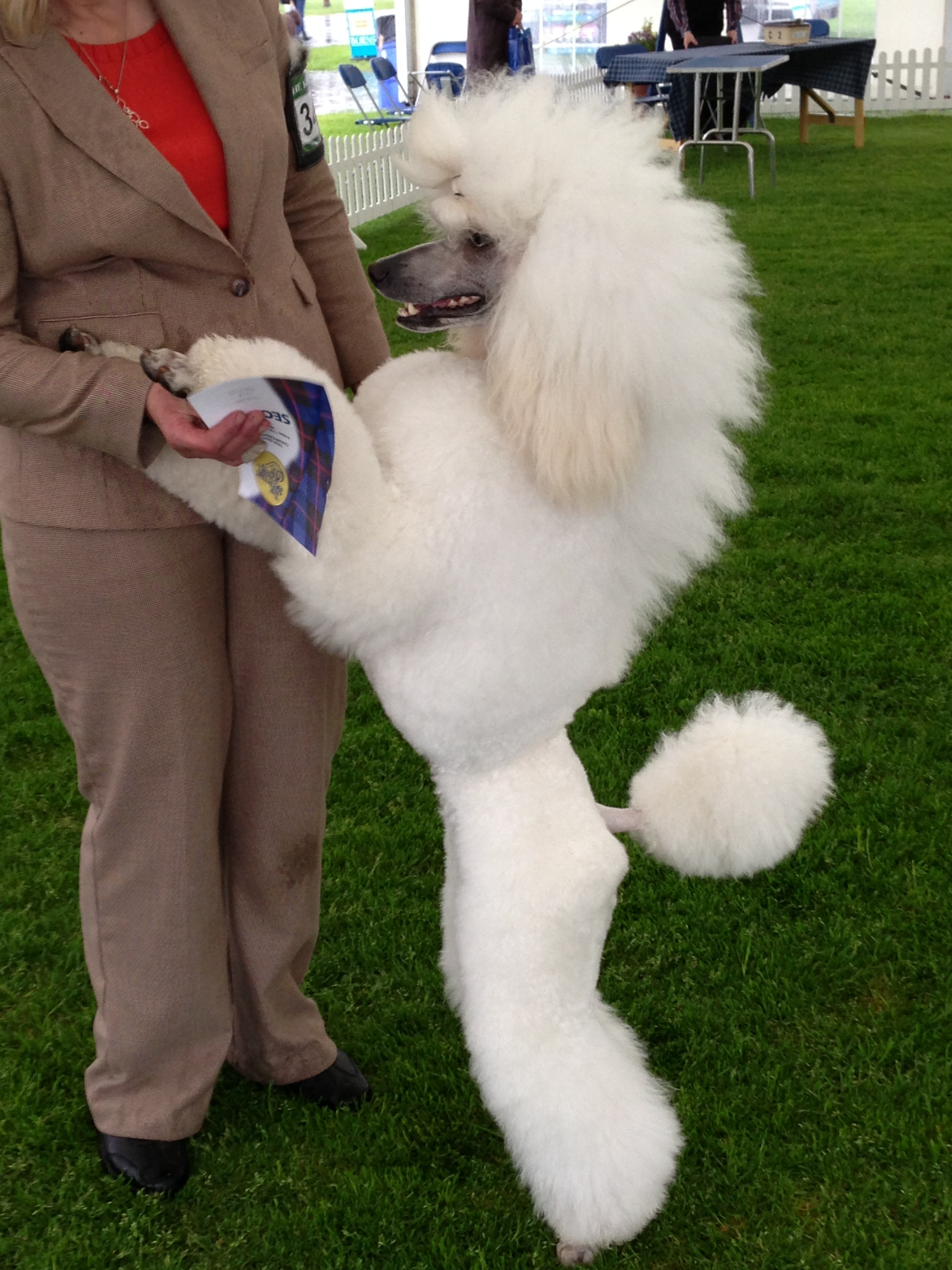
Pale cream Standard Poodle

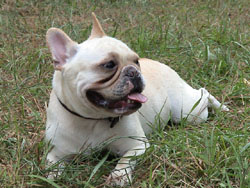
Cream French Bulldog

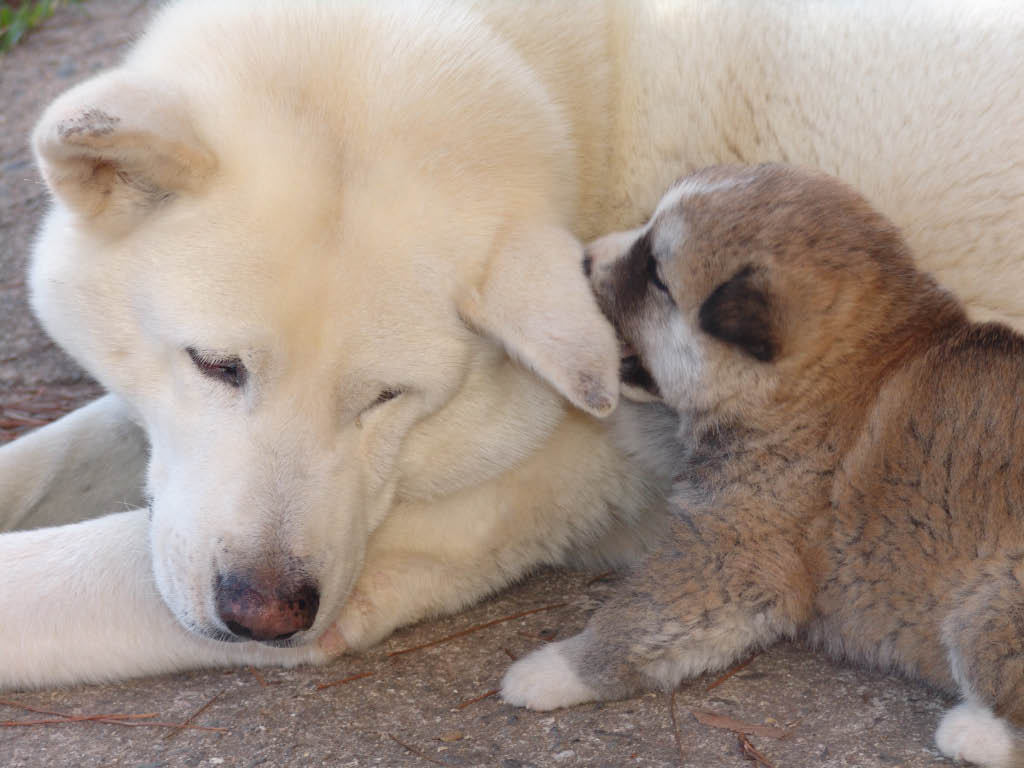
Cream Akita

==== Fawn ====
Fawn typically refers to a yellow, tan, light brown, or cream dog that has a dark melanistic mask.

With Weimaraners, fawn refers to their typical brownish grey colouration that with other breeds is usually called lilac.

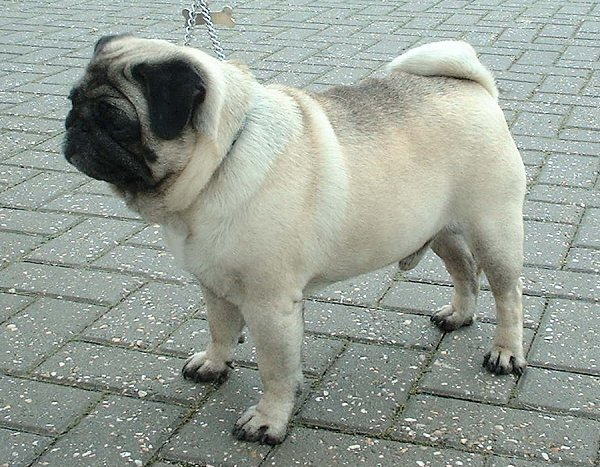
Silver Fawn Pug

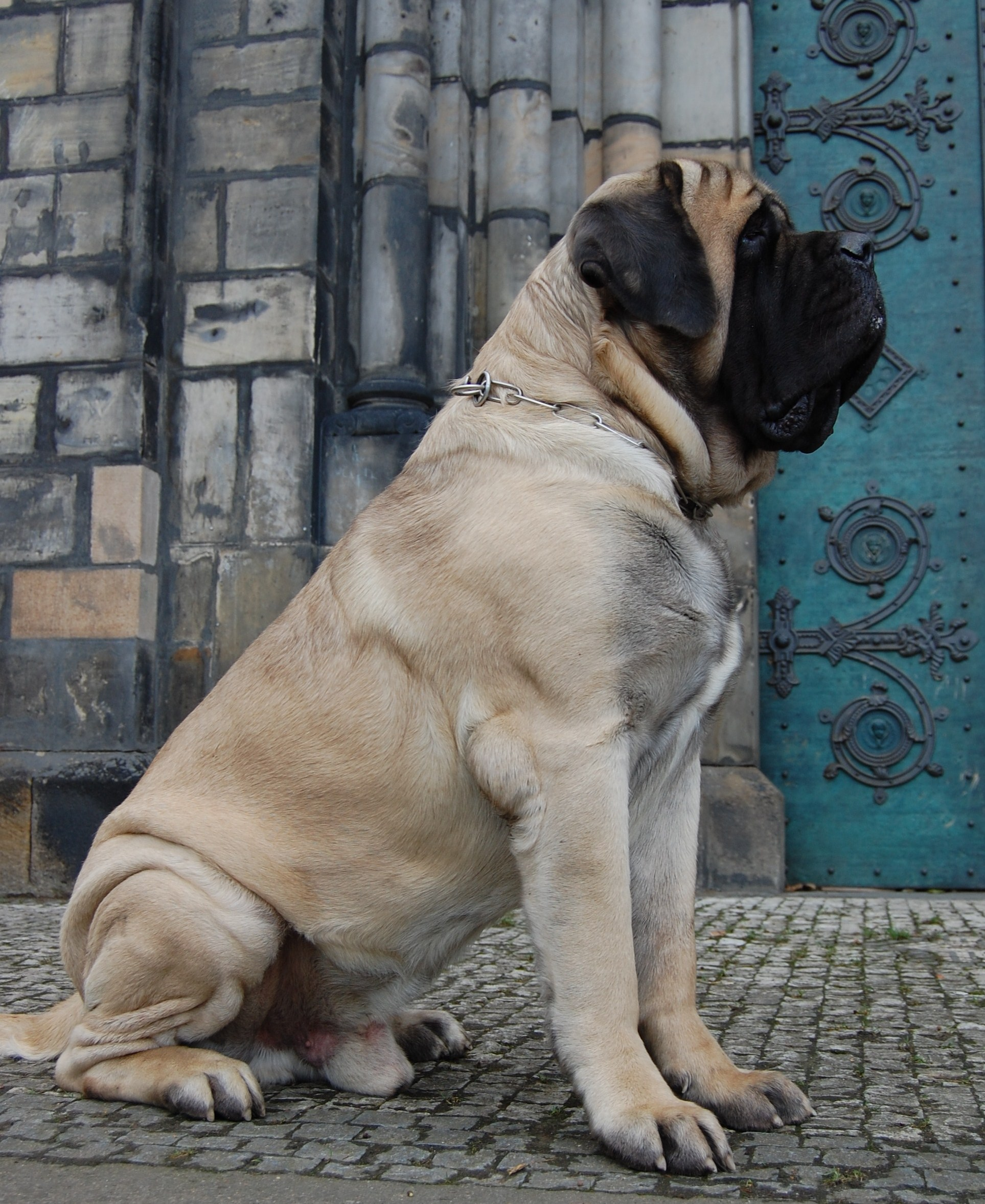
Fawn English Mastiff

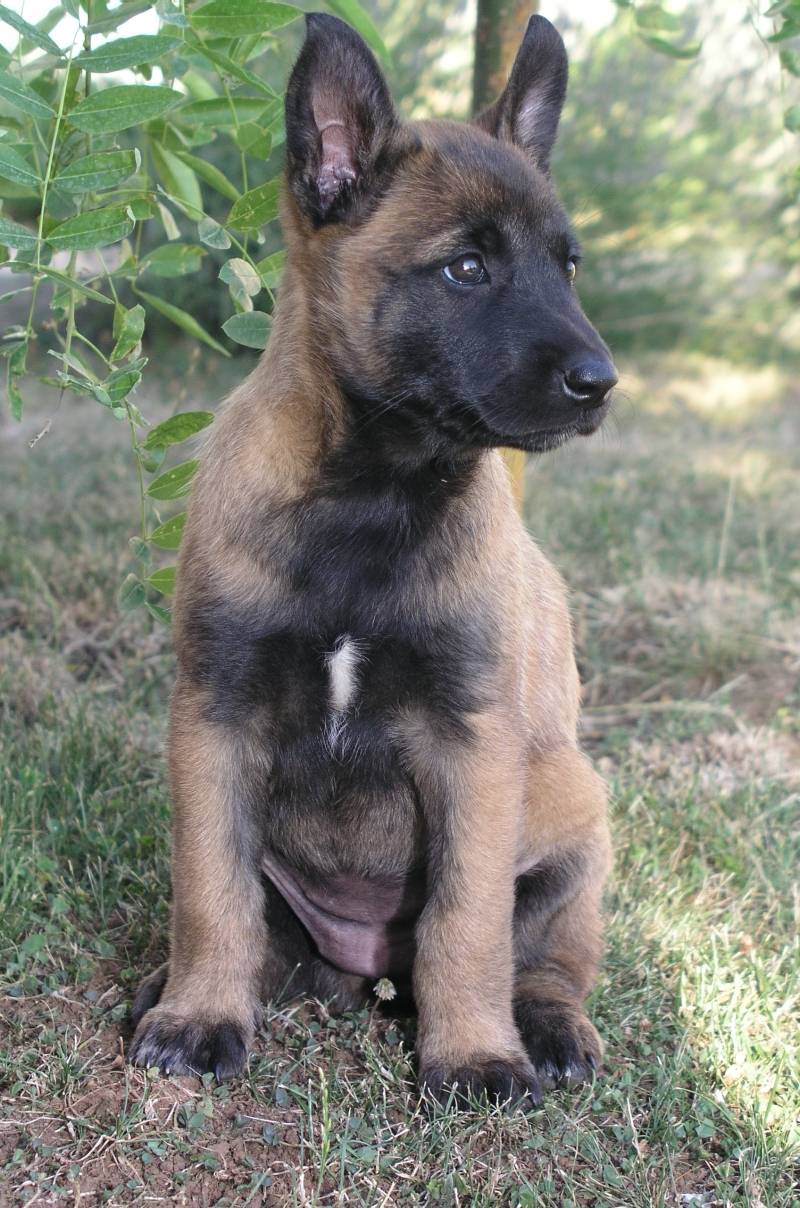
Fawn Belgian Shepherd Malinois with breed-typical extended [dark] mask

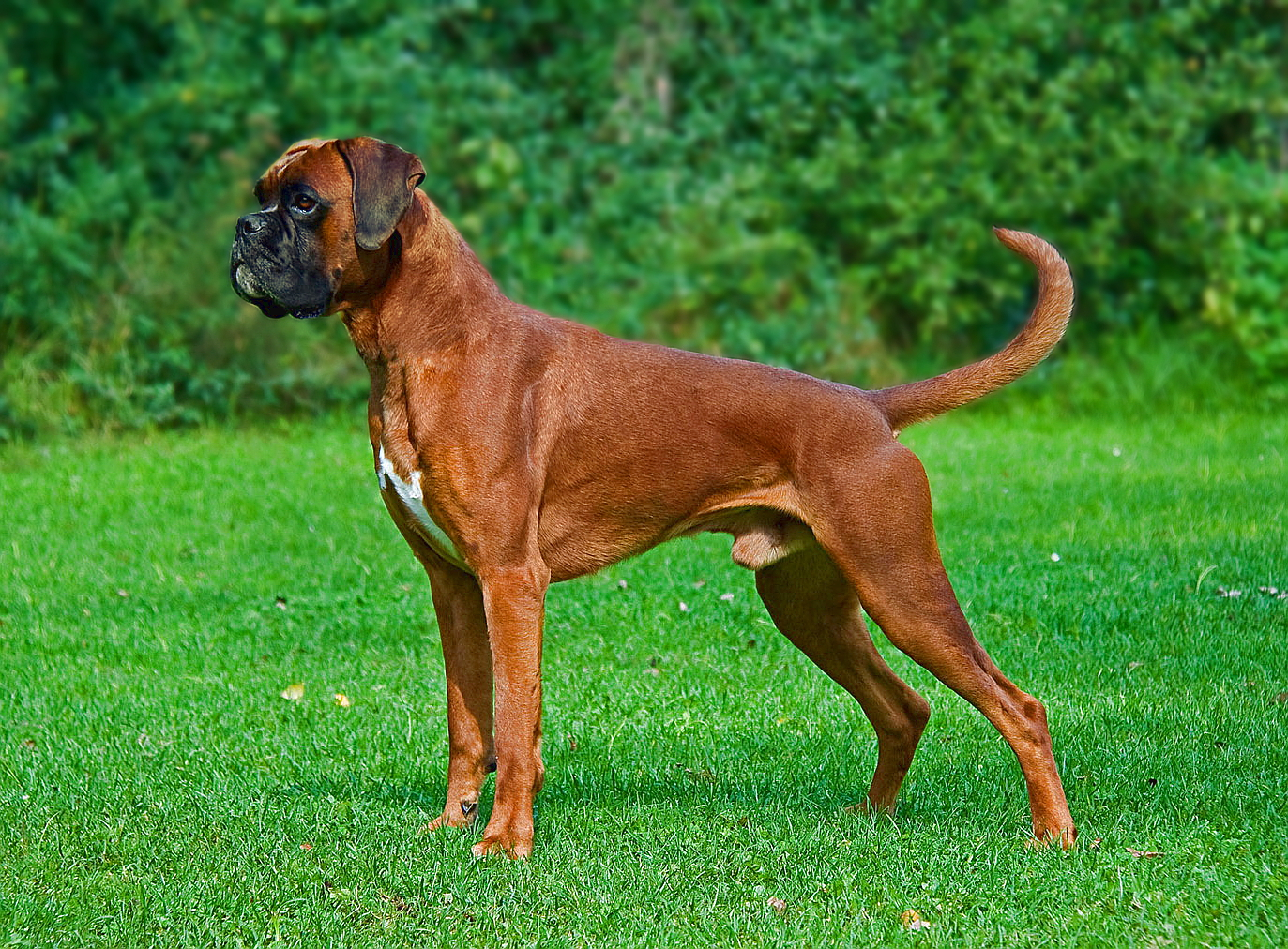
Fawn Boxer

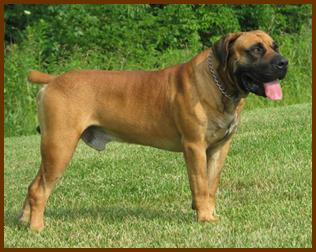
Fawn Boerboel

==== Black ====
Black is a pure black that can get grizzled as the dog ages, or have a tendency to gain a brownish cast when exposed to the elements.

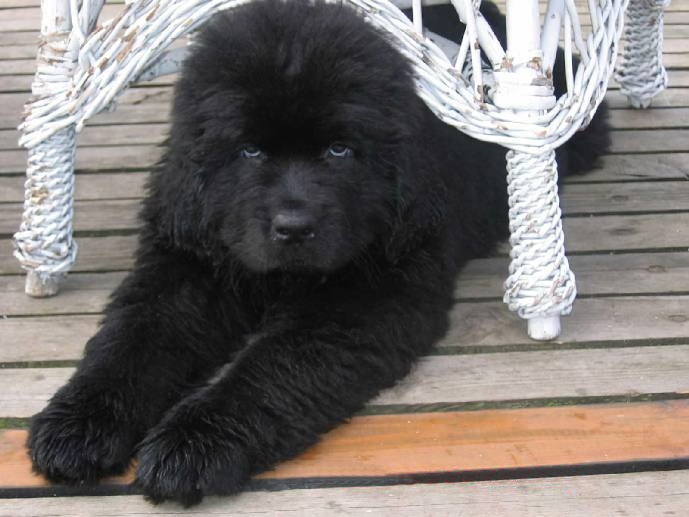
Newfoundland

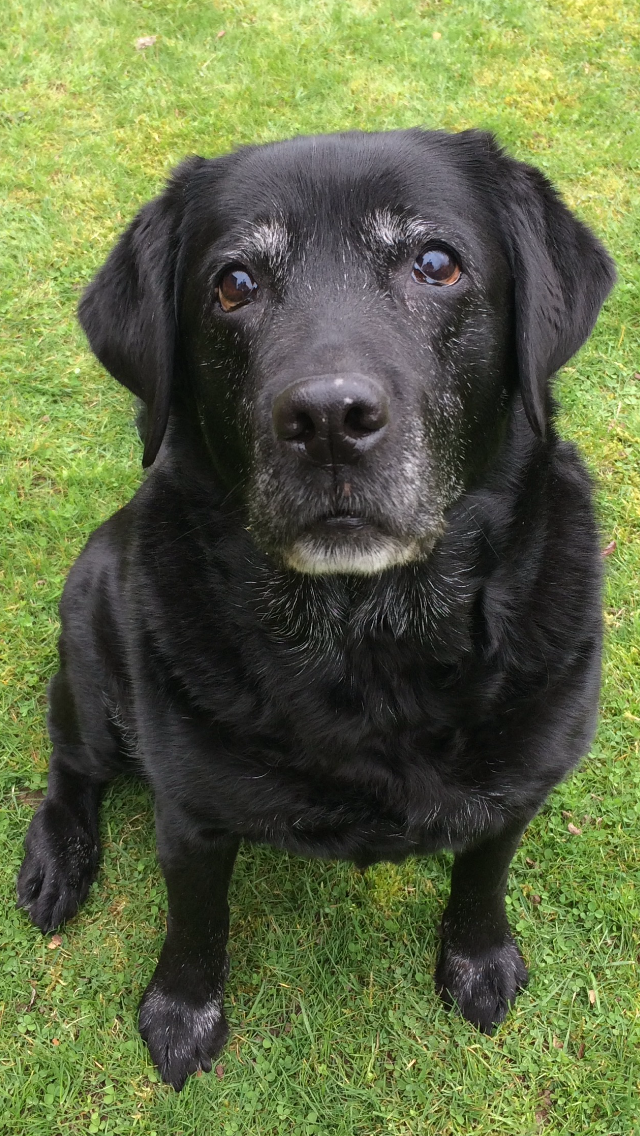
Elderly black Labrador Retriever with age-related grey hairs on head and feet

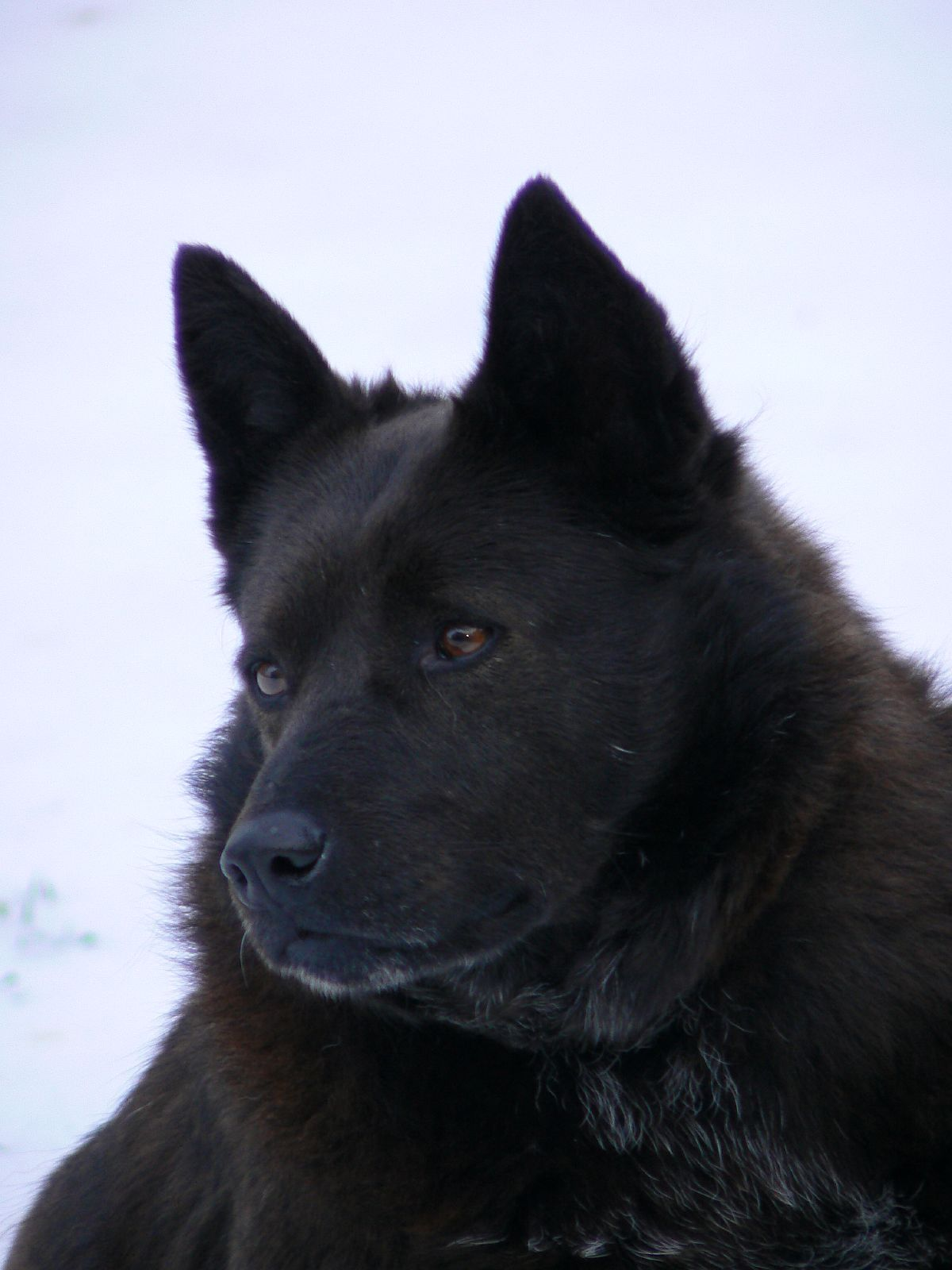
Black Schipperke

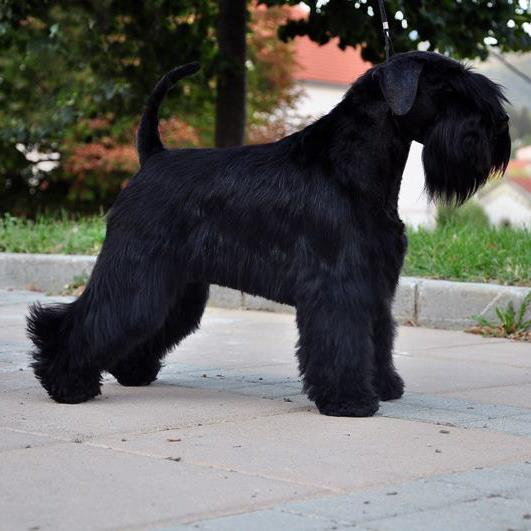
Black Schnauzer

==== Blue ====
Blue is a cool-toned, metallic grey. It typically means a d/d dilution of black pigment, a grey colouration that is grey from birth, but has a wide range of breed-specific meanings.

In Kerry Blue Terriers, Poodles, and Bearded Collies, "blue" refers to colouration that is black at birth and progressively greys out as the dog matures. In Australian Shepherds, Rough Collies, and Shetland Sheepdogs, blue means a blue (black-based) merle. In Australian Silky Terriers, blue means a saddle-type black and tan pattern, where the black parts of the coat progressively fade to a steel grey as the dog matures and in Australian Cattle Dogs, blue stands for a densely ticked black-based colouration with an overall blue-grey appearance.

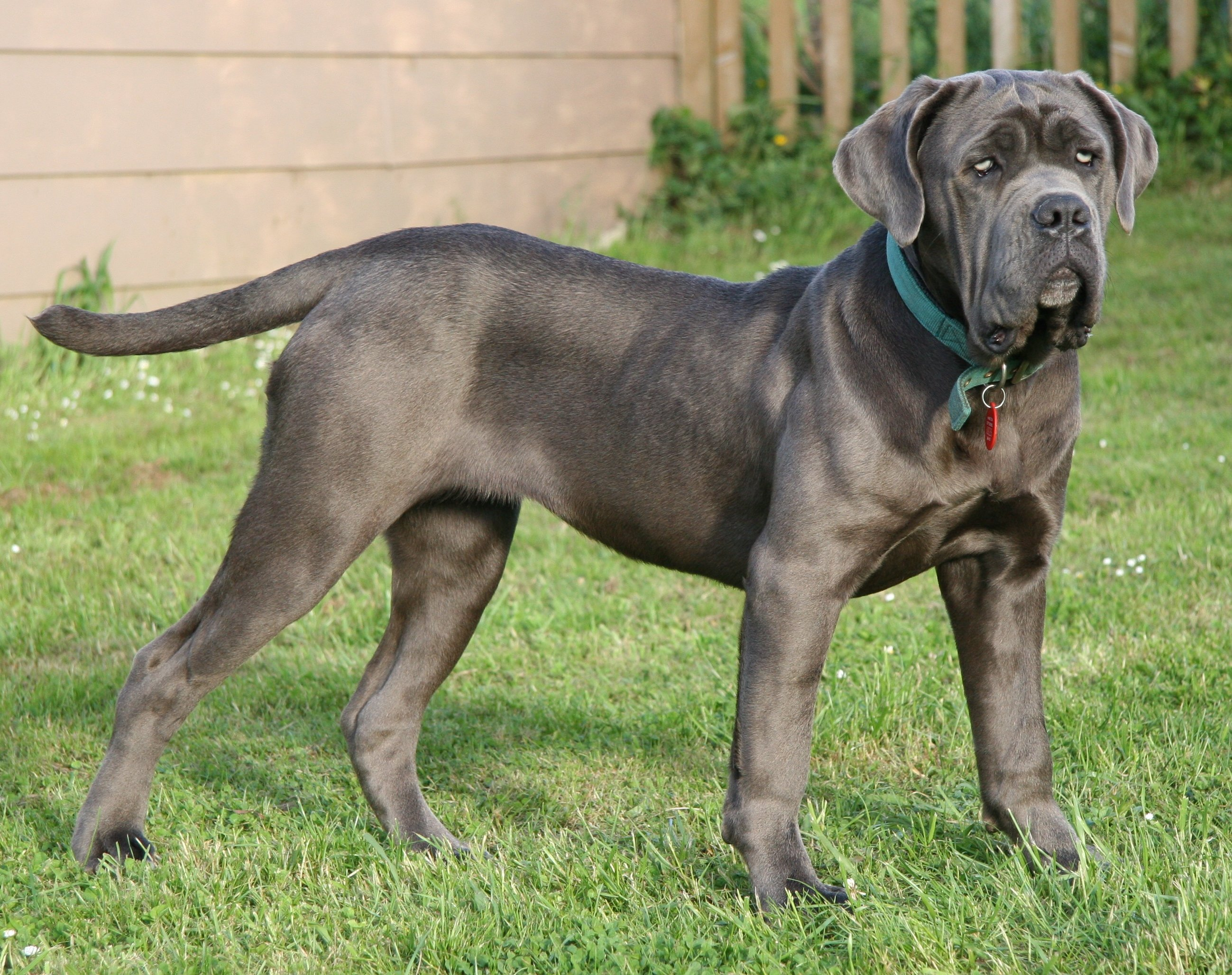
Blue Neapolitan Mastiff

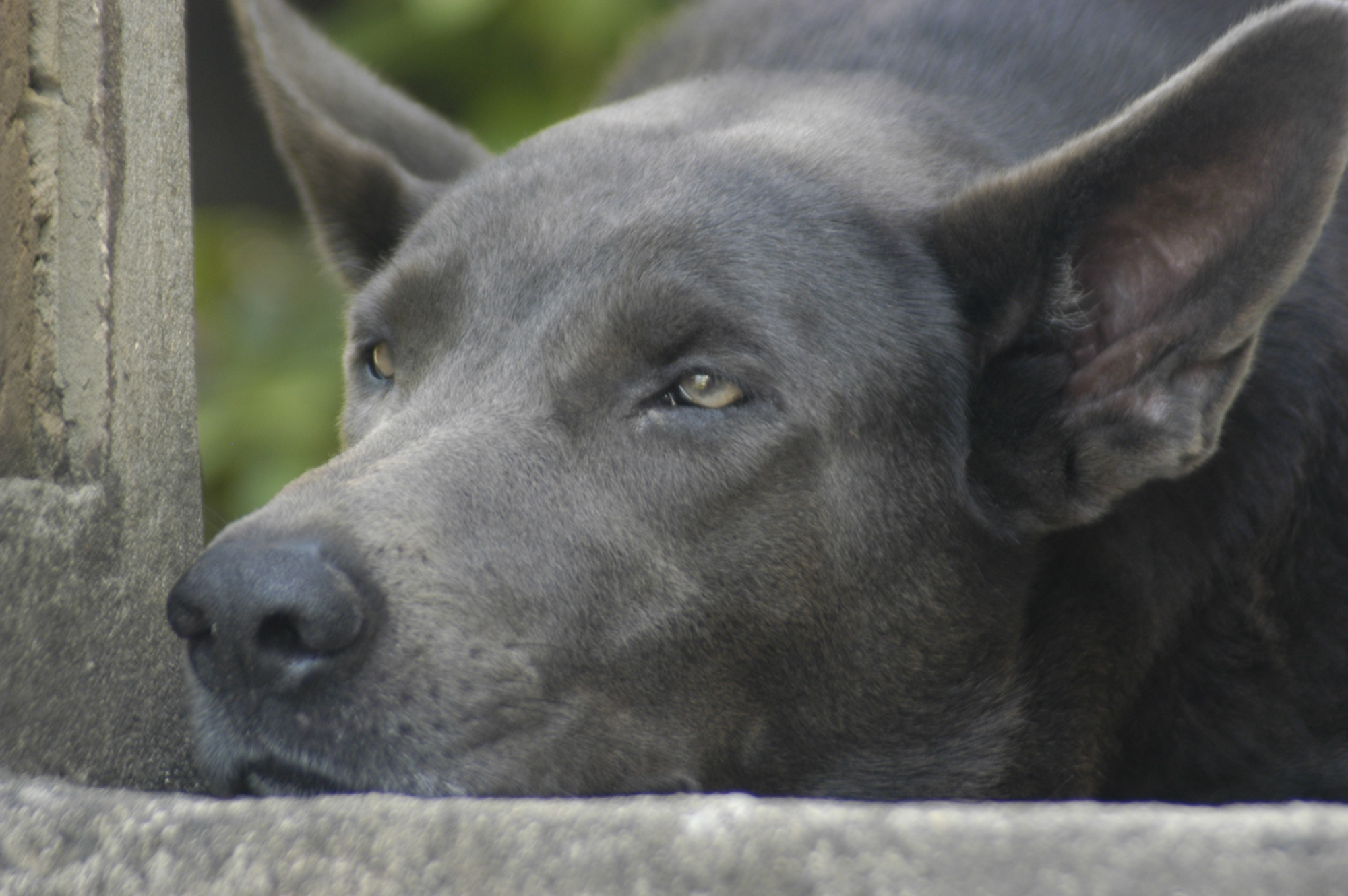
Blue mixed-breed dog

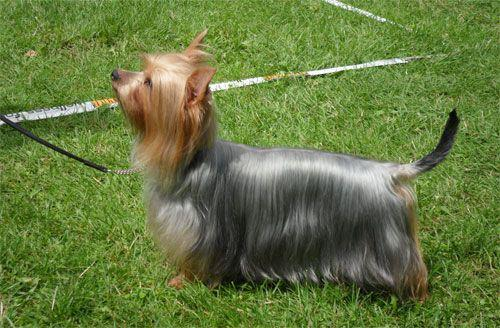
Blue Australian Silky Terrier

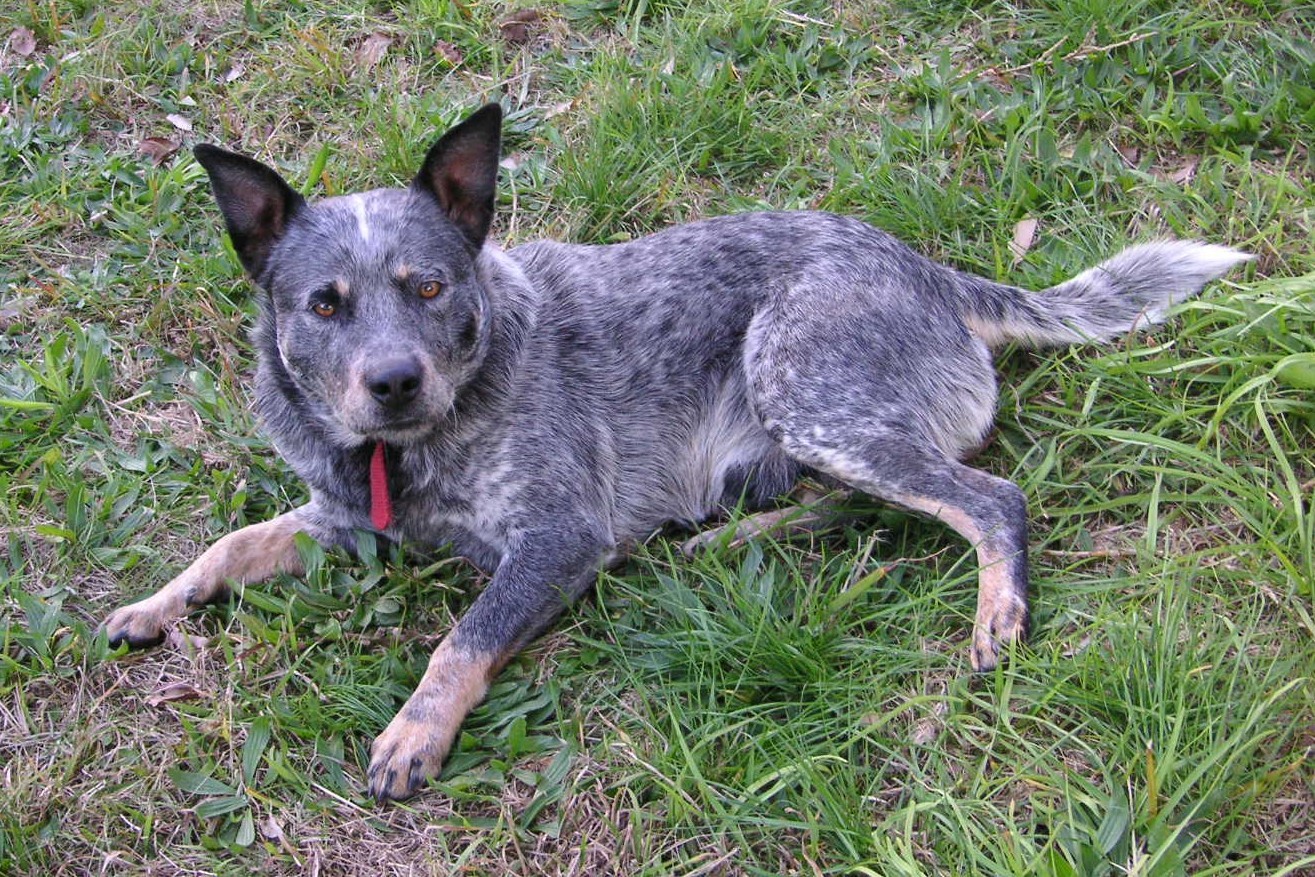
Blue Australian Cattle Dog

==== Grey ====
Grey simply means a grey colouration of any shade. It can be used as an alternative synonym of blue, but tends to mean some other type of grey than the d/d dilution of black. Synonyms include silver, pepper, grizzle, slate, blue-black grey, black and silver, steel. Greys of a dusty or brownish cast are often lilac, a d/d dilution of liver, and this colouration does not have much of a commonly recognised name. Across various breeds, it is called lavender, silver-fawn, isabella, fawn, café au lait or silver beige.

In Poodles, a blue is a very slowly fading, very dark steel grey, whereas a silver is a quicker to clear, much lighter grey that can range from a pale platinum to a steel grey. Both are black at birth with minimal markings to indicate future change. Similarly, café au lait is a slower and darker and silver beige a quicker and lighter progressively greying brown, i.e. liver.

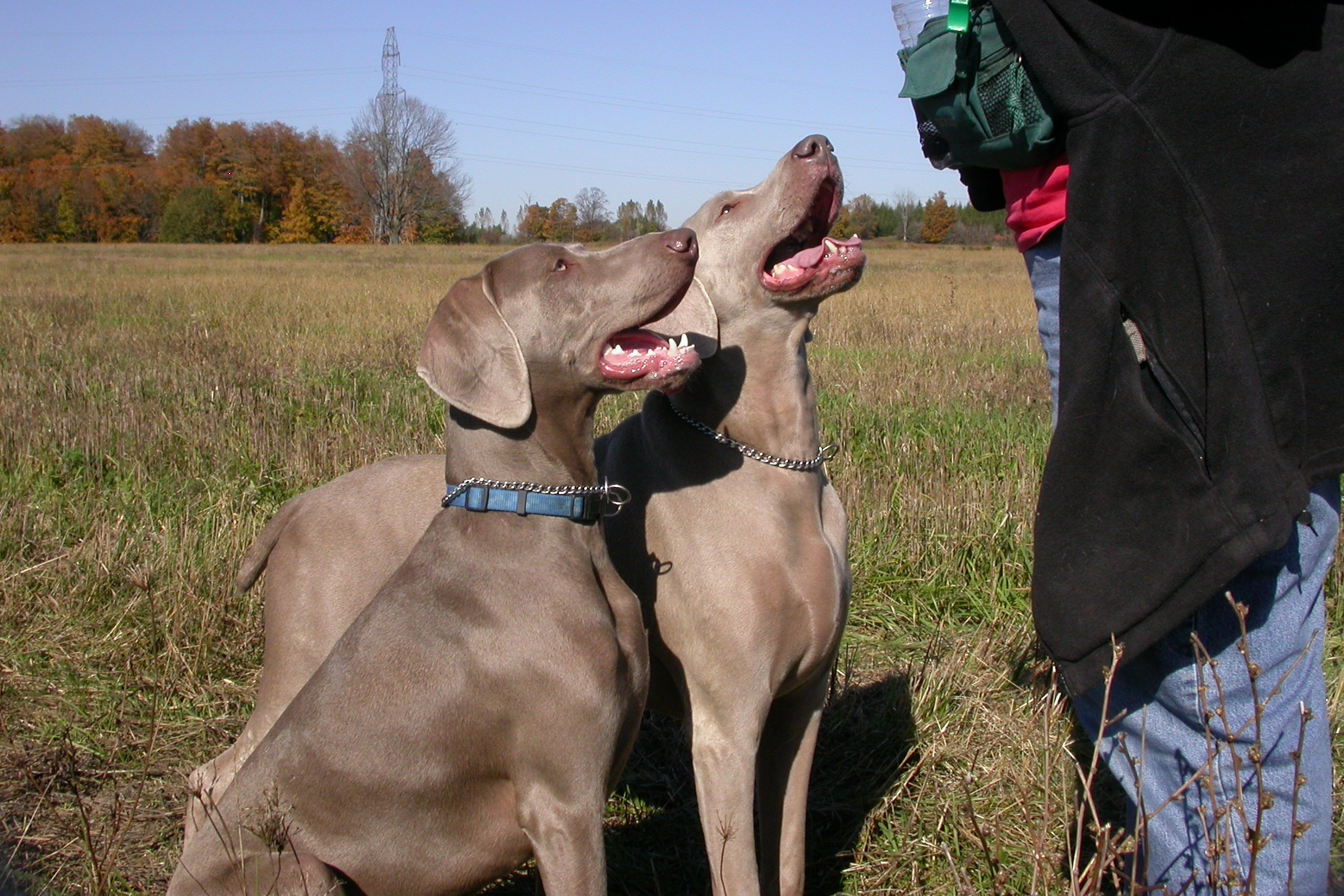
Lighter and darker fawn Weimaraners

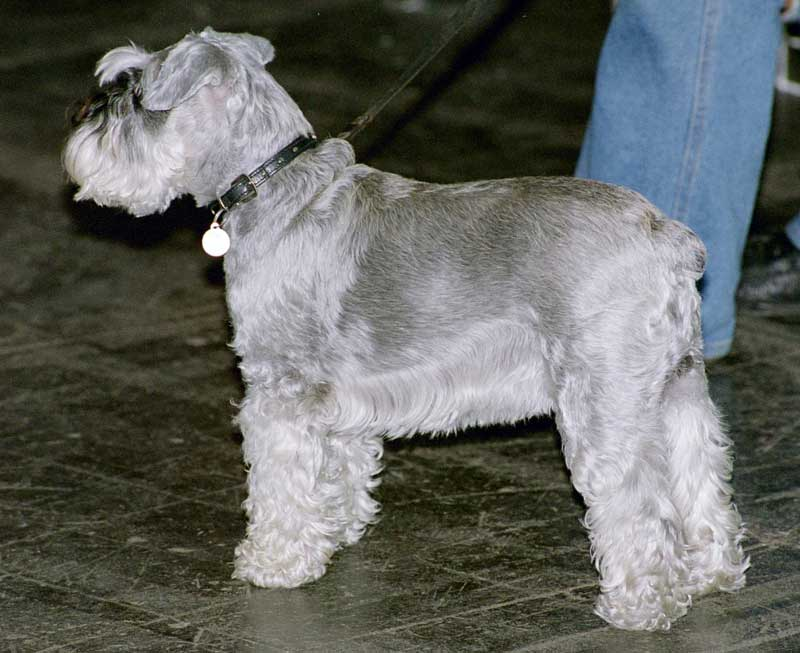
Silver Miniature Schnauzer

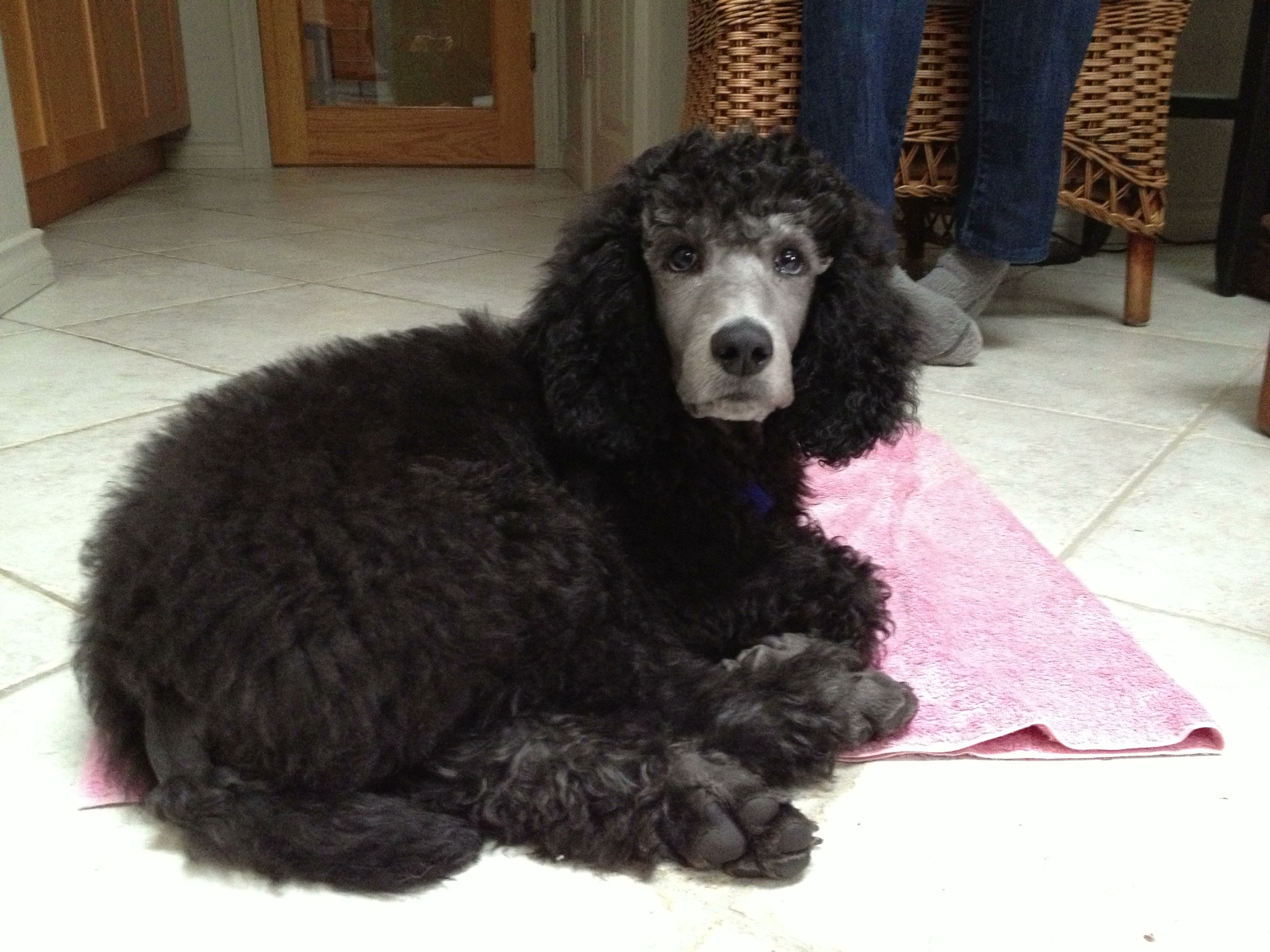
Young Silver Standard Poodle in the earliest stages of graying out

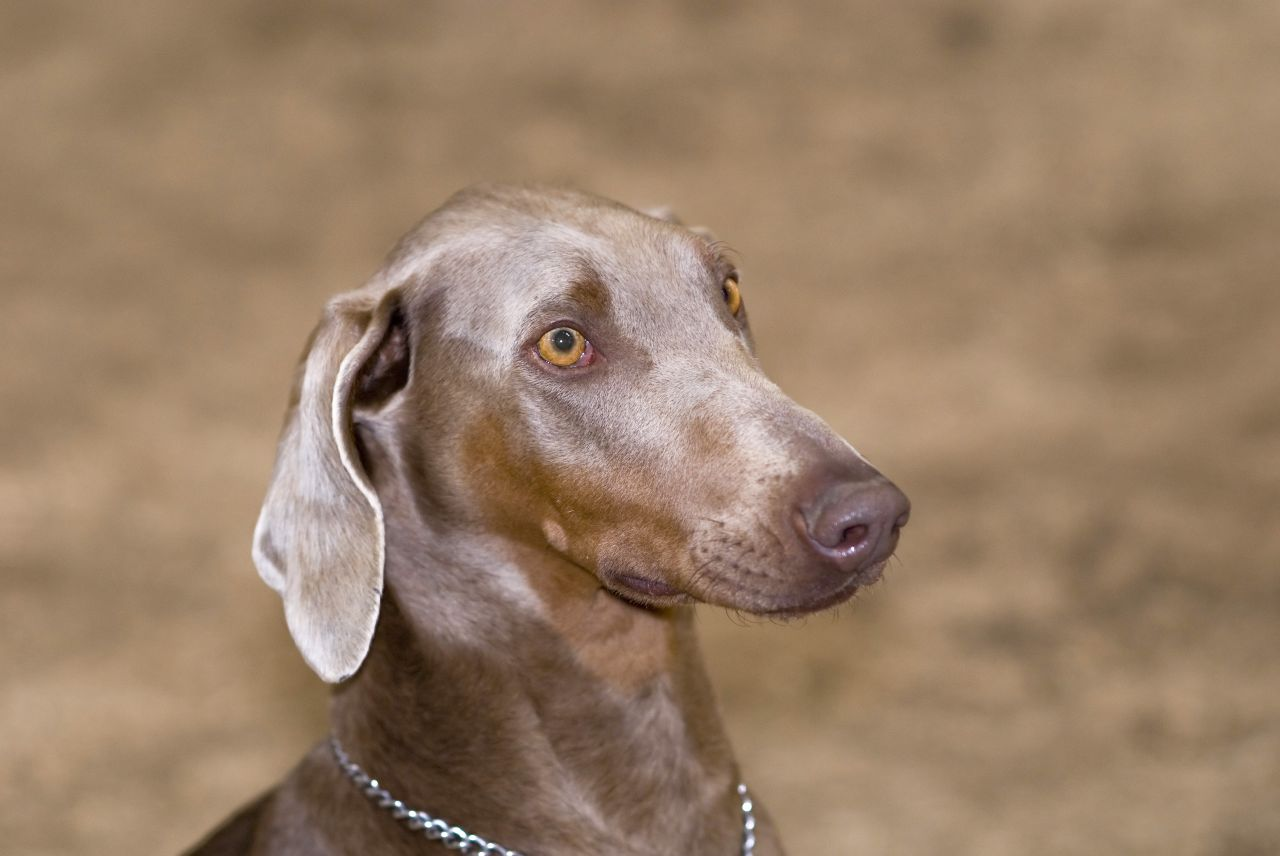
Isabella/fawn Dobermann

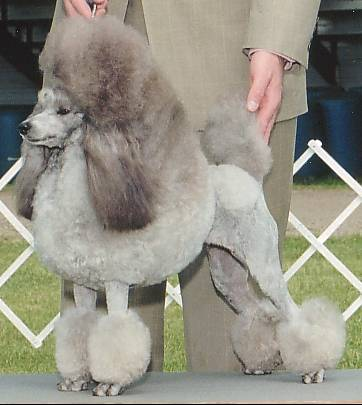
All grown up Silver Miniature Poodle

==== White ====
White: Such a light cream that it is seen and described as pure white, making them distinct from albino dogs. A white dog, as opposed to an albino one, has dark pigment around the eye rims and nose, often coupled with dark-colored eyes. There is often some coat identifiable as cream between the dog's shoulder blades. Extreme piebald dogs can also appear all white, but are caused by a separate factor.

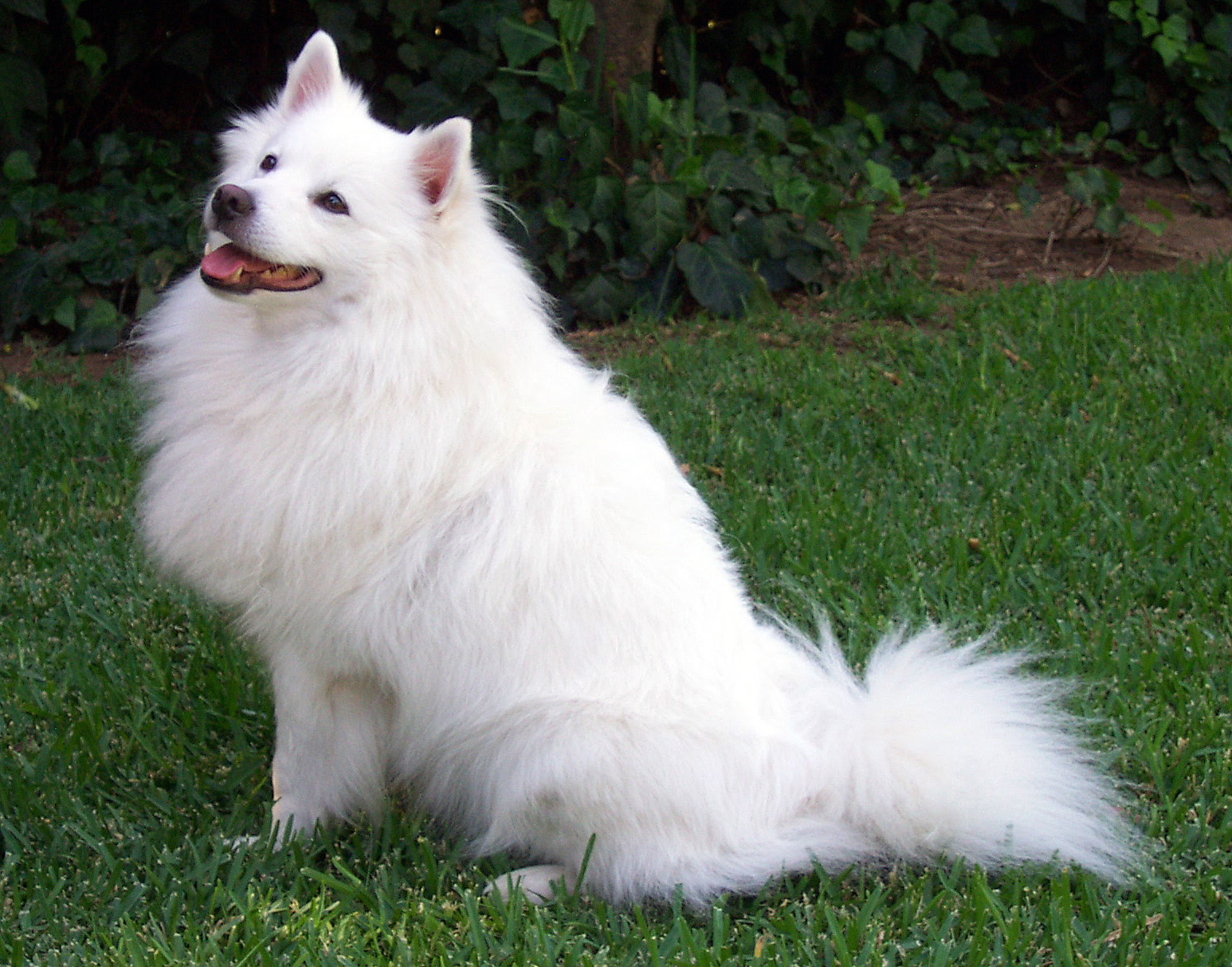
White American Eskimo Dog

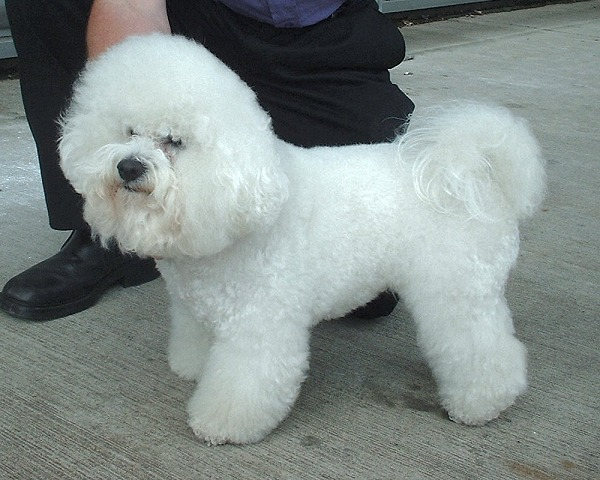
White Bichon Frisé

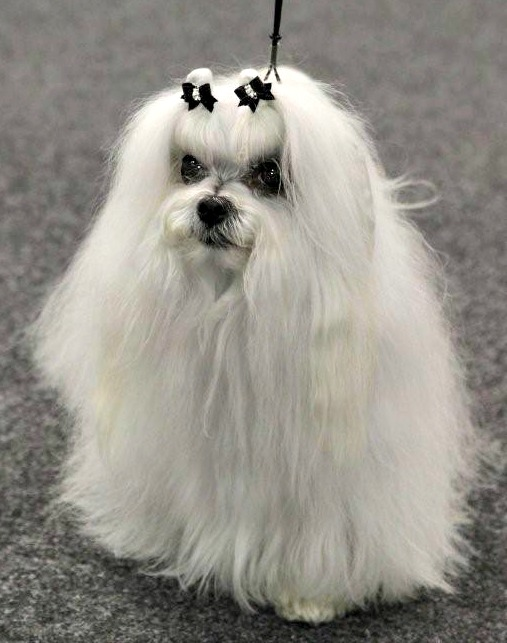
White Maltese dog

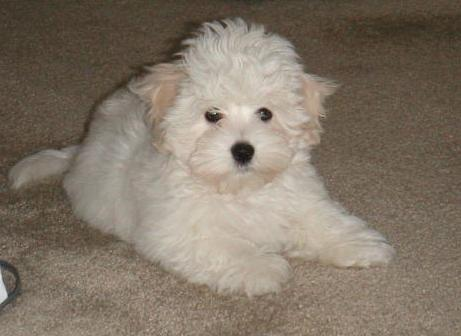
White Coton de Tulear puppy

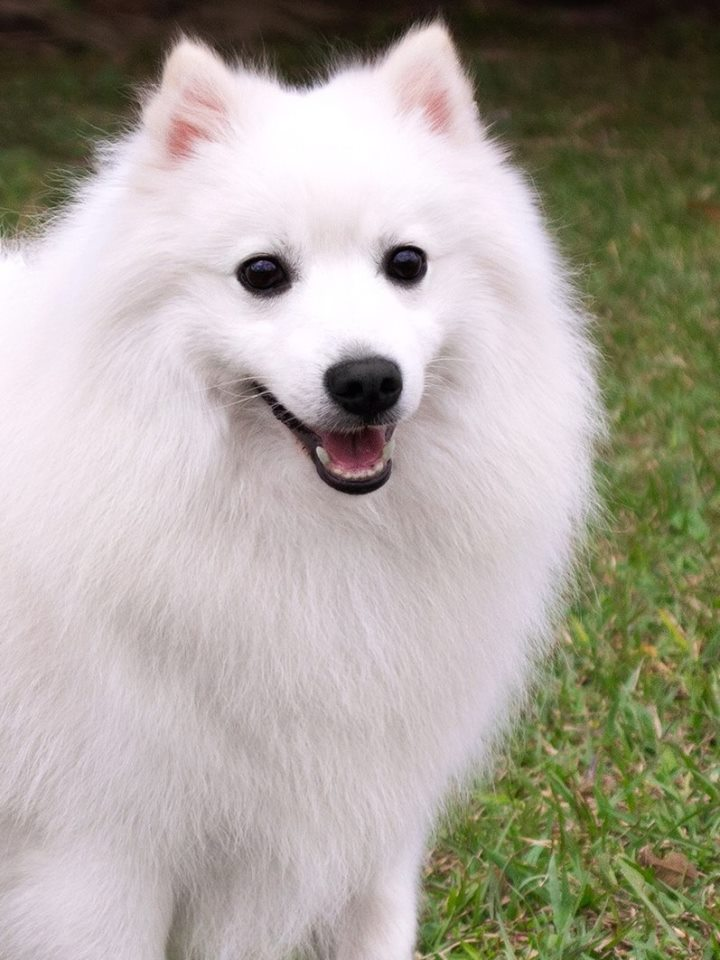
White Japanese Spitz

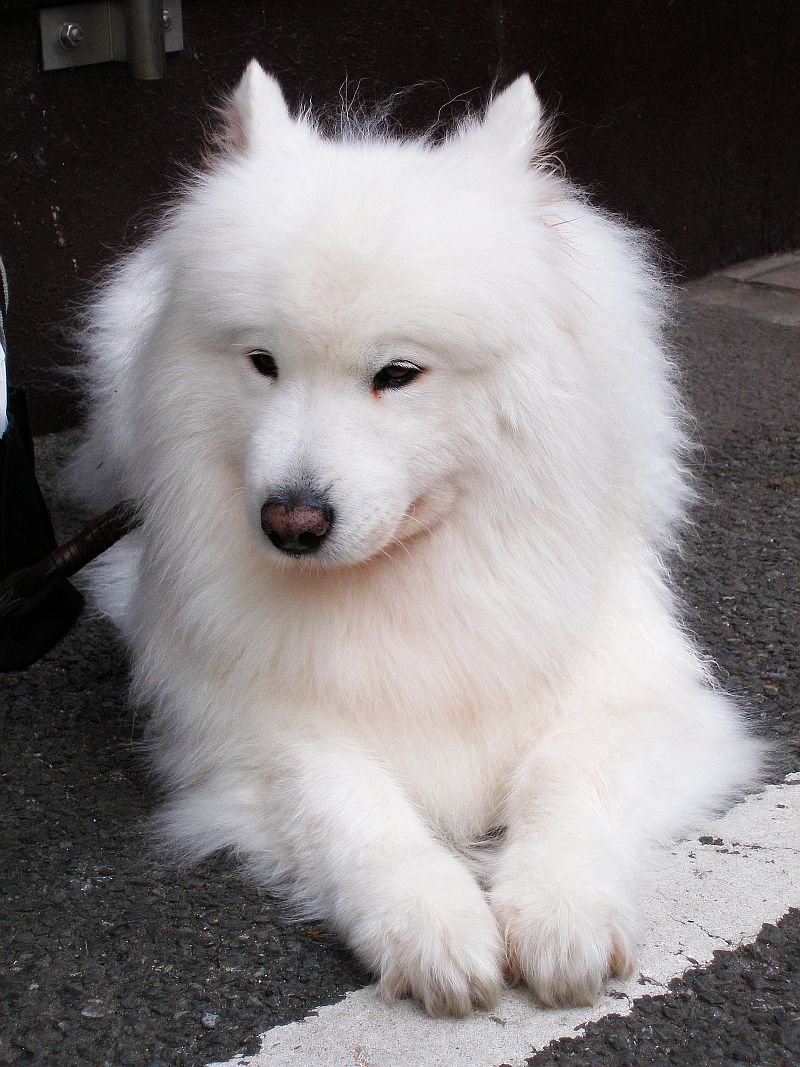
Samoyed dog

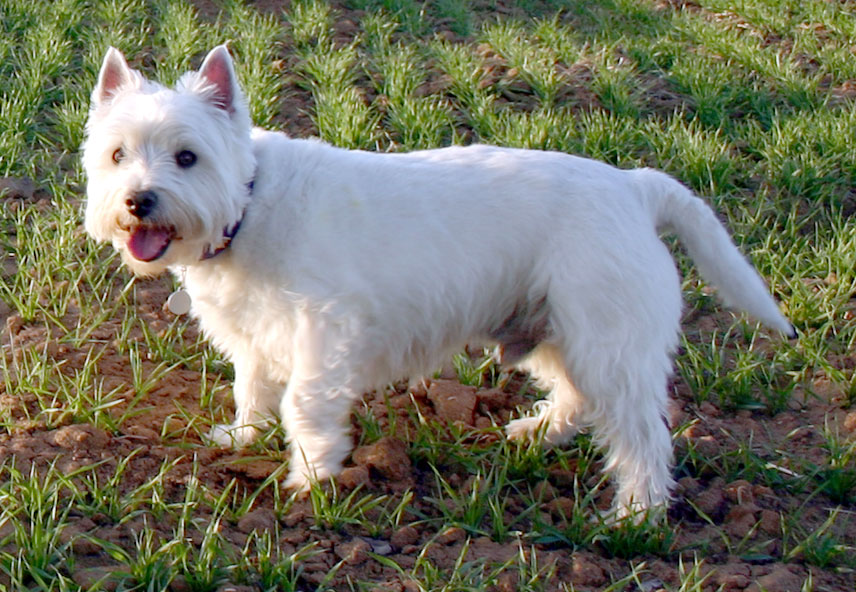
West Highland White Terrier

=== Patterns ===
The same pattern may be referred to differently in different breeds.

Black and Tan Dachshund	Black and tan Miniature Pinscher	Black and tan, liver and tan, blue and tan: Coat has both colors but in clearly defined and separated areas, usually with the darker color on most of the body and tan (reddish variants) underneath and in highlights such as the eyebrows. Black and brindle and liver and brindle, in which the same pattern is evident with brindling in place of tan, are also possible, but less common.
Black and white Border Collie	Blenheim (Red-brown and white) Cavalier King Charles Spaniel	Piebald or pied (also called bicolor, tricolor, Irish spotted, Flashy, Patched, Tuxedo): any color or pattern coupled with white spotting. This can range anywhere from white toes and tail tip to a mostly white dog with color around the base of the ears and tail. Some breeds have special names for the color combinations; for example, Cavalier King Charles Spaniel uses Blenheim for reddish brown (chestnut) and white. Irish Spotted or flashy pattern is symmetrical and includes a white chest, white band around the neck, white belly, and white feet or "boots". This pattern is commonly seen in herding dogs, and Boxers, among others. The piebald gene is responsible for this pattern.
Extreme piebald Borzoi with small colored patches	Piebald white Dogo Argentino	Extreme piebald or piebald white: an extensive piebald pattern that renders the dog mostly or all white with pink skin. Usually some pigmented specks remain. Governed by the piebald gene.
Tricolor Basset Hound	Tricolor Beagle	Tricolor: Three clearly defined colors, usually either black, liver, or blue on the dog's upper parts, white underneath, with a tan border between and tan highlights; for example, the Smooth Collie, the Rough Collie, the Papillon, or the Sheltie. Tricolor can also refer to a dog whose coat is patched, usually two colors (such as black and tan) on a white background.
Blue merle tricolor Shetland Sheepdog	Red merle Catahoula Leopard Dogs	Merle: Marbled coat with darker patches and spots of the specified color. Merle is referred to as "Dapple" in Dachshunds.
Tuxedo Lab mix.	Tuxedo Collie mix	Tuxedo: Solid (often black) with a white patch (shirt front) on the chest and chin, and white on some or all of the feet (spats.) Named after the tuxedo dinner suit, the pattern is common in dogs that carry only one piebald gene (a heterozygous carrier).
Harlequin Great Dane	Harlequin Great Dane	Harlequin: "ripped" splotches of black on white. The Great Dane is the only breed with this pattern. The term harlequin is also sometimes used to describe a piebald spotting pattern, such as parti-colored poodles.
Spotted Dalmatian	Spotted mutt in Sinamaica, Venezuela	Spotted: Coin-sized pigmented spots on a white background. The spotting on Dalmatians is unique as it involves mutations in at least three different spotting genes.
Red-speckled Australian Cattle Dog	Liver-ticked German Shorthaired Pointer	Flecked, ticked, speckled: also called belton in English Setters
Orange belton (orange and white speckled) English Setter	Blue speckled Australian Cattle Dog	Flecked, ticked, speckled: also called belton in English Setters
Brown brindle and white Boxer	Very sparsely brindled Great Dane	Brindle: A mixture of black/liver/blue/lilac and red/yellow/cream arranged in a vertical "tiger stripe" pattern.
Airedale Terrier with large black saddle	Norwegian Dunker with merle-affected black saddle	Saddle or blanket: A different color, usually darker, over the centre of the back.
Dark orange sable Pomeranian	Sable Pembroke Welsh Corgi	Sable: Black-tipped hairs overlaid onto a different coloured, lighter background, including grey, silver and gold.
Hairless Chinese Crested Dog	Xoloitzcuintle	Hairless: Some dogs are born without a fur coat.

== Length and texture ==
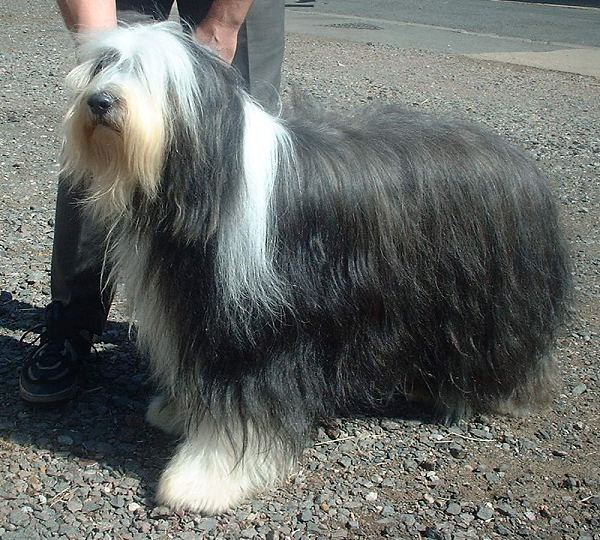
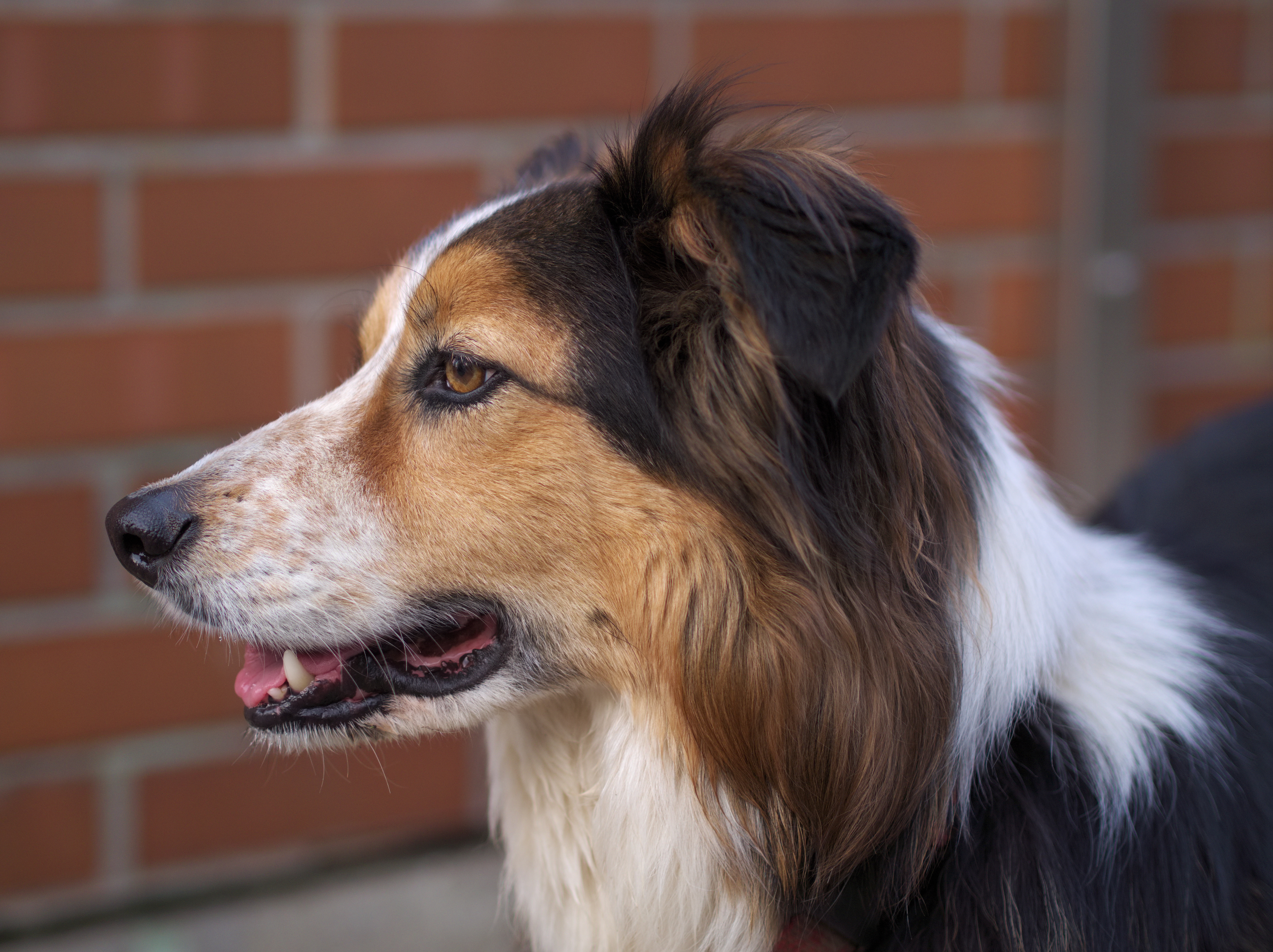
Bearded Collie (left, with facial furnishings) vs border collie (right, no furnishings)

Dogs demonstrate an enormous diversity in coat length and texture, from the very short and smooth coat seen in the vizslas, to the wiry coat of a Scottish Terrier and the corded coat of the Puli and the Komondor.

Generally, coats vary along three categories: length (long vs. short), texture (curly vs. straight), and coarseness (wire-haired vs. non-wire). These three categories all interact with one another; thus, one can see a short, curly, and wired coat in the Wirehaired Pointing Griffon, and a long, straight, and non-wired coat in the Pomeranian.

Additionally, breeds show variation in patterns of growth - that is to say, parts of the dog's body where the coat may be longer or shorter. The same gene that controls wiriness of hair also causes furnishings to be present (e.g. beard, moustache, eyebrows) - compare the bearded collie, furnishings present, to the border collie, which lacks furnishings. Some breeds show feathering: fringes of longer hair on the ears, belly, tail, and back of the legs (e.g., Saluki and any of the setters).

Dogs also vary in the thickness of the undercoat. Some dogs have only a single (rather than a double) coat, or a very reduced undercoat (e.g. the Vizsla), which results in a thinner coat. Certain breeds, especially spitz-type breeds, tend to have a thicker undercoat, which helps retain heat in cold and wet weather.

Furthermore, complete hairlessness on parts of the body is present in breeds such as the Chinese Crested or the Xoloitzcuintli.

== Shedding ==
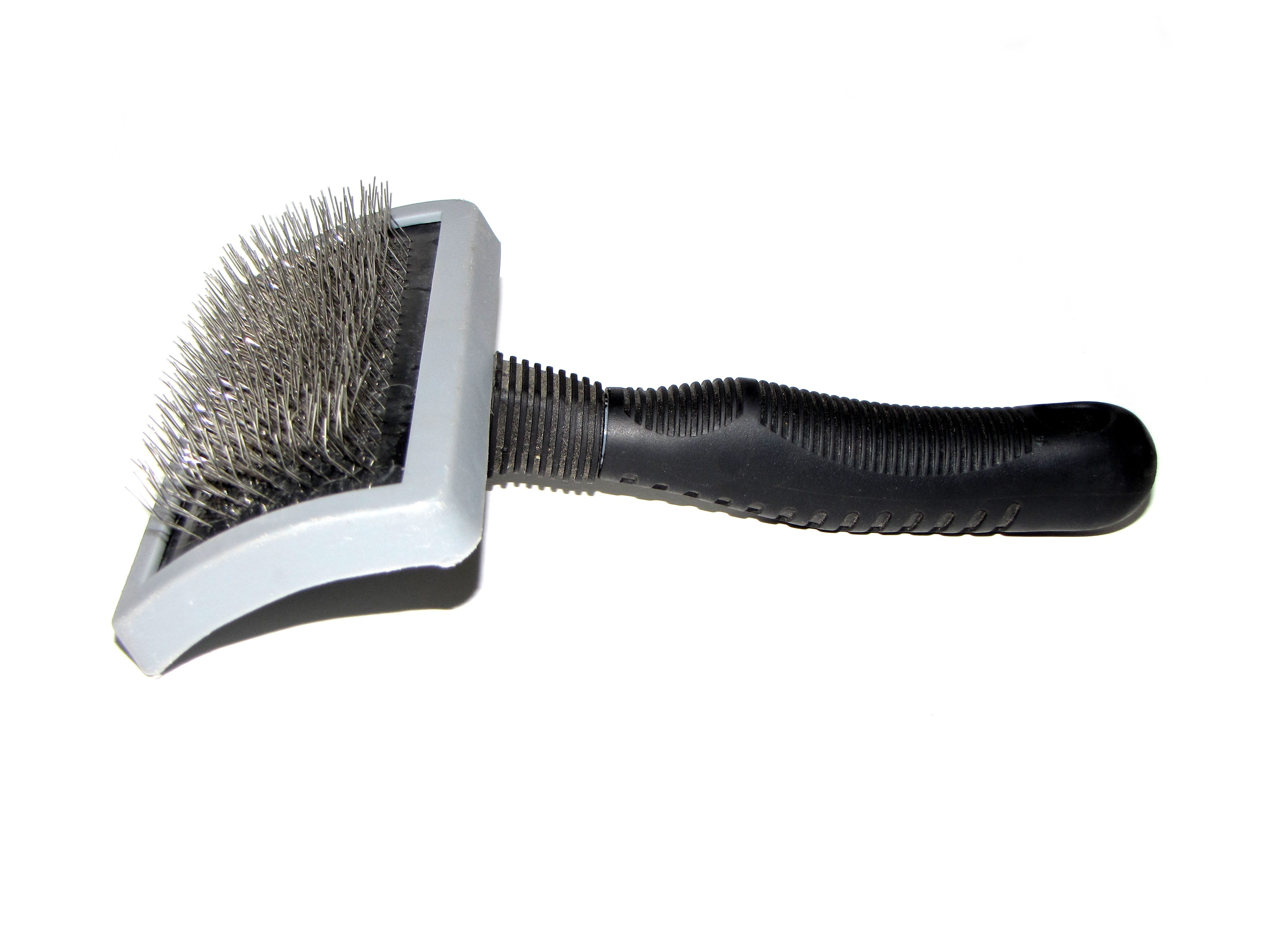
A slicker brush with wire bristles, used for removing loose hair from the coat

Shedding of hair can occur continuously, but in many breeds is strongly influenced by hormones. Seasonal shedders shed most in spring and fall, following an increase or decrease in day length, and least in summer and winter, in response to constant day length. Cold temperatures stimulate hair growth, so that the heaviest shedding is in spring on dogs living in cold climates. Artificial lighting can alter the seasonal shedding pattern of dogs who live indoors. Other hormonal influences include dietary factors, reproductive hormones in intact dogs, and various medical conditions and disorders. Shedding that is done in a short period of time is known as "blowing the coat" or "blowing coat". Among the other coat types, dogs with fine silky coats (e.g., spaniels) are generally moderate shedders, those with an intermediate coat texture (e.g., mountain dogs) are generally heavy shedders, and those with thick stand-offish coats (e.g., spitzes) are generally very heavy shedders.

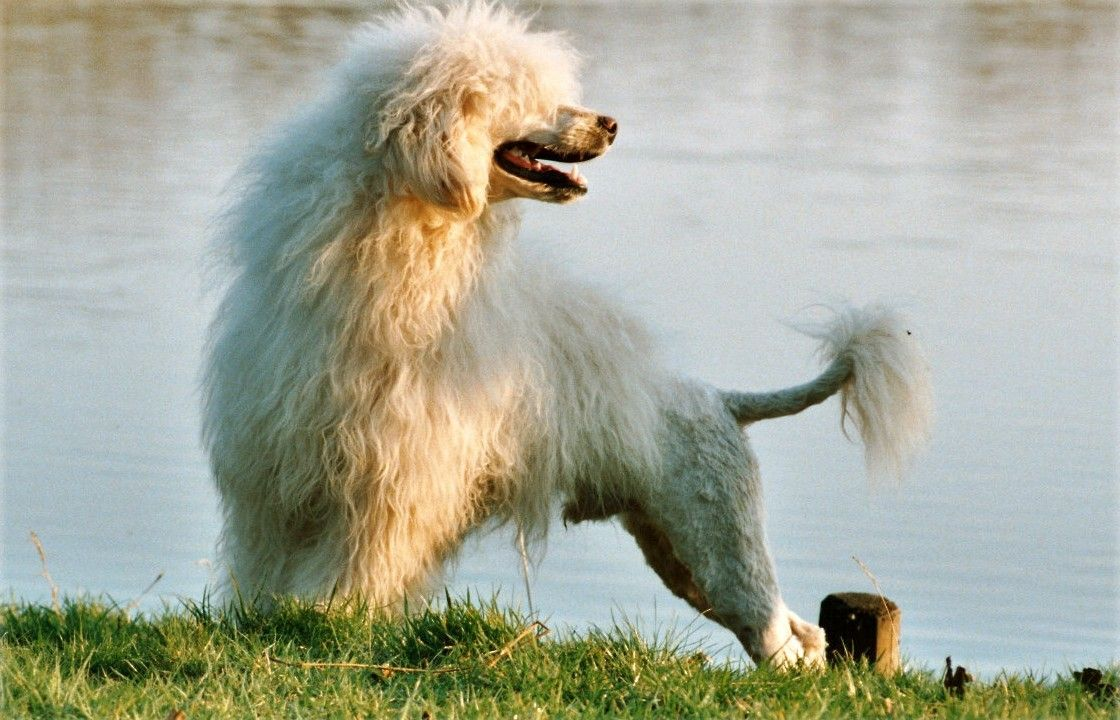
The Portuguese Water Dog is an example of a breed with single, low-shedding coat.

"Non-shedding" dogs have greatly-reduced shedding due to alterations to the hair follicle growth cycle:

- homozygosity for the furnishings (wire) allele - Most breeds with facial furnishings (including ones whose faces are usually shaved removing the furnishings) are low-shedding, but they must be homozygous, so dogs of mixed wire/non-wire parentage (e.g., terrier crosses or breeds with wire and non-wire varieties) can be heavy shedders. There are a few furnished breeds that shed more (e.g., Old English Sheepdog, Bearded Collie, Briard, Otterhound);
- at least one copy of the single-coat (non-shedding) allele - Most dogs with a smooth coat are low shedding, as well as the fringed or flat coat. There are breeds with a very short coat that shed more (e.g., Basset Hound, English Bulldog, Pug, Toy Fox Terrier, Dalmatian, Vizsla, German Shorthaired Pointer);
- single coat (no undercoat) plus furnishings (homozygous) - These breeds shed the least (e.g., Poodle, Soft-coated Wheaten Terrier).

=== Hypoallergenic coat ===
"[D]ogs are a relevant source of allergens, but diagnosing dog-related allergies may present difficulties ..." Some dog breeds have been promoted as hypoallergenic (which means less allergic, not free of allergens) because they shed very little. However, no canine is known to be completely nonallergenic. Often the problem is with the dog's saliva or dander, not the fur. Although breeds such as poodles, Bedlington Terriers, bichons, Yorkshire Terriers, and wire-haired terriers are commonly represented as being hypoallergenic due to reduced shedding, the reaction that an individual person has to an individual dog may vary greatly. In a report, describing dog allergen extracts of dog hair, belonging to patients' dogs or from dogs of the same breed, with low molecular mass that are absent in extracts of commercial allergen test kits, it has been found that "[f]actors related to individual dogs seem to influence the allergenicity more than breed or gender."

== Show coats ==
The nature and quality of a purebred dog's coat is important to the dog fancy in the judging of the dog at conformation shows. The exact requirements are detailed in each breed's breed standard and do not generalise in any way, and the terminology may be very different even when referring to similar features. See individual breed articles for specific information.

== Nutritional impacts on coat ==
A dog's coat is an outward indicator of internal well-being. For this reason, coat health is an important aspect of pet care to many dog owners. Dog coats can be impacted by nutritional components from the diet. Below is a table that summarizes the effects of several nutrients (minerals, vitamins) on the domestic canine coat, based on current evidence:

Nutrient	Role	Impacts when deficient	Benefits
Zinc	Gives strength to collagen	Dry and brittle coat	Contributes to coat growth and prevents brittle and dry coat
Copper	Involved in keratinization	Brittle fur, hypo-pigmentation, discoloration	Improved color and keratinization
Selenium	Cell growth; antioxidant	Sparse coat growth	Coat growth promotion
Vitamin A	Proliferation of keratinocytes	Rough coat	Proliferation of keratinocytes; hair follicle growth
Biotin	Saturation of Coat	Alopecia and achromotrichia beginning at the root of the coat	Contributes to coat shine, thickness/distribution of hair follicles

=== Trace minerals ===
==== Zinc ====
Zinc contributes to hair growth and can prevent hair from becoming dry and brittle. In addition to, zinc when supplemented in combination with linoleic acids has been found to improve the coat of canines by reducing water loss in the trans-epidermal layer of the skin. Dogs can obtain zinc in their diet, through the addition of various ingredients, including; red meats, whole grains, poultry by-product meals, and fish meals.

==== Copper ====
Copper is a trace mineral that is required in the diet of canines at 7.3 mg/kg. Copper is involved in multiple enzymatic pathways. In dogs, a lack of copper in the diet, leading to a copper deficiency, results in incomplete keratinization. This leads to a dry coat, hypo-pigmentation, and discoloration of the coat.

==== Selenium ====
Selenium is another one of the many trace minerals essential for a dog's diet. Selenium is typically required in lower levels in comparison to other minerals. It is involved in the prevention of oxidative damage as well as the production of anti-oxidants. Selenium aids in the promotion of coat growth. Lack of selenium in the diet of a dog can contribute to the occurrence of sparse coat growth. Dogs can obtain selenium in their diet through the addition of various ingredients including; tuna fish, halibut, sardines, beef, chicken, and egg.

=== Vitamins ===
==== Vitamin A ====
Vitamin A deficiency can lead to rough coat, scaling of skin, and other dermatitis issues like alopecia. It is also essential for cells to properly proliferate keratinocytes, which are epithelial cells that produce keratin on the outermost layer of the skin for the cortisol cells of the hair follicle. A deficiency in vitamin A can cause the common symptoms of dermatitis (dry, scaling skin and dull coat).

==== Vitamin B7 (Biotin) ====
Vitamin B7, also known as biotin, is a water-soluble nutrient that is known to play a role associated with the maintenance and development of hair starting from the follicle. Although it has not been clinically shown to improve hair growth with supplementation alone, it has been shown to reverse deficiency in dogs born deficient.

Symptoms of biotin deficiency include alopecia and achromotrichia. A clinical study of biotin showed the importance of biotin in coat pigmentation. There different stages of hair development, as shown in clinical studies using mice. Each stage of hair development has a different sensitivity to biotin present in the body. For example, the shaft development is not greatly affected by biotin access. During the last stage, the amount of biotin available for use by the body will alter the success of that development greatly. Throughout the hair development, most stages of growth are completed, but it was found that in the last stage, where biotin levels were insufficient, there was an incorrect keratinization of the root of the hair, causing the hair to fall out of the body.

The supplementation of biotin cannot reverse affects caused by deficiency, but as soon as supplementation is given and biotin levels are restored to adequacy, the body begins to produce the usual hair growth and color it would before the deficiency took place.

=== Essential fatty acids ===
Polyunsaturated fatty acids found in the diet play a critical role in the maintenance of a healthy coat in dogs, and have even been shown to improve coat condition when supplemented in the diet. Furthermore, diets lacking essential fatty acids in their diet will manifest as unkept, matted coat. Omega fatty acids 3 and 6 are highly unsaturated fatty acids, making them especially metabolically active.

The proper combination of these omega fatty acids is crucial to achieve optimal benefits. Proper omega 6:3 ratios have been shown to diminish allergy triggered immune responses, thus improving overall coat condition. The National Research Council (NRC) recommends a 2.6:1 to 26:1 omega 6:3 ratio for adult dog maintenance diets. The proper ratio of these fatty acids is crucial because each has an opposing role in inflammation within the body and both compete for the same enzymatic pathway. Dogs, like many mammals, lack the desaturase enzymes capable of interconverting omega 3 and 6 fatty acids. Therefore, the amount of inflammation in the body is dependent on the ratio between omega 3 and 6 fatty acids. Too little inflammation suppresses the immune system and the body's ability to heal, however excessive inflammation can irritate the skin and reduce the coat's overall appearance.

Aside from omega fatty acids, lipid content in the canine diet is an important aspect of coat health. The fat soluble vitamins (A, D, E and K) require lipids present in the diet for absorption, transport and deposition in canine adipose tissue. The specific role of vitamins A and E for coat health are explored elsewhere in this article, as they pertain to immune function. Another pet food regulating body, the Association of American Feed Control Officials (AAFCO), recommends that Vitamin E supplementation increase as polyunsaturated fatty acids are added to diet in order to counteract lipid oxidation and maintain the potency. In addition, high fat diets in dogs were shown to dramatically improve coat sheen and appearance. It is thought excess cholesterol esters are incorporated into the hair follicle, leading to the improved coat appearance. The same study, by Kirby, Hester and Bauer (2007), stated the optimal approach to an improved coat in dogs is a combination of increased dietary fat and the proper amount of polyunsaturated fatty acids.

==== Omega 3 (linolenic acid) ====
Omega 3 fatty acid, also known as linolenic acid, is an anti-inflammatory compound. Linolenic acid is found in the oil from flaxseeds, soybean and canola. Some better known examples of linolenic acid are the metabolic derivatives eicosapentaenoic acid (EPA) and docosahexaenoic acid (DHA). EPA inhibits the enzyme delta-5-desaturase, which prevents the synthesis of arachidonic acid which is an inflammatory omega 6. DHA acts even earlier in omega 6 metabolism, by inhibiting delta-6-desaturase. The anti-inflammatory properties of omega 3s stem from their ability to inhibit the inflammatory action of omega 6 fatty acids. A functional minimum has not been set forth by AAFCO, as one has yet to be determined. A reduction in inflammation of somatic tissues, skin especially, supports coat health.

==== Omega 6 (linoleic acid) ====
Omega 6 fatty acid, also known as linoleic acid, is found in poultry fat and the oil from safflower, sunflower, corn and flaxseed. Arachidonic acid is a well known metabolic derivative of linoleic acid, found only in animal sources. As mentioned above, arachidonic acid is a pro-inflammatory compound. It is critical to note once again that canines are unable to interconvert between omega fatty acids and over supplying linoleic acid promotes excessive inflammation in the body, which can potentially reverse the coat benefits seen by supplying omega fatty acids in the diet. In contrast, linoleic acid is also required for epidermal lipid function and water retention, which benefits coat shine. Having linoleic acid present in the diet has demonstrated a positive effect on skin, and thus by extension, coat.

== See also ==
- Chiengora
- Dog grooming
- Dog skin disorders
- Hypoallergenic
- List of dog breeds
- Merle (coat color in dogs)
