= Alopecia X =

Genetic disease of dogs resulting in hair loss

Alopecia X is a type of adult-onset follicular dysplasia in dogs previously known by many other names. The condition was first described in 1977. The condition is believed to be caused by a genetic predisposition to a hormone defect. Often dogs will recover after neutering.

== Etymology ==
The condition was previously known under multiple names including: adult-onset growth hormone deficiency, growth hormone responsive alopecia, castration responsive alopecia, biopsy responsive alopecia, black skin disease, and congenital adrenal hyperplasia-like syndrome. Today it is known as Alopecia X which reflects the unknown origin of the disease.

== Cause ==
The cause is unknown. One theory of a growth hormone deficiency being the cause was abandoned when multiple studies showed normal growth hormone responses following stimulation and normal IGF-1 levels in affected dogs. Why some dogs with alopecia X show a suppressed growth hormone response remains unknown. Mild hypercortisolism has been suggested as a cause of alopecia X in miniature Poodles and Pomeranians.

== Risk factors ==
Alopecia X primarily affects breeds with long and dense coats such as the Pomeranian, Keeshond, Chow Chow, Siberian Husky, and Alaskan Malamute.

== Signs and symptoms ==
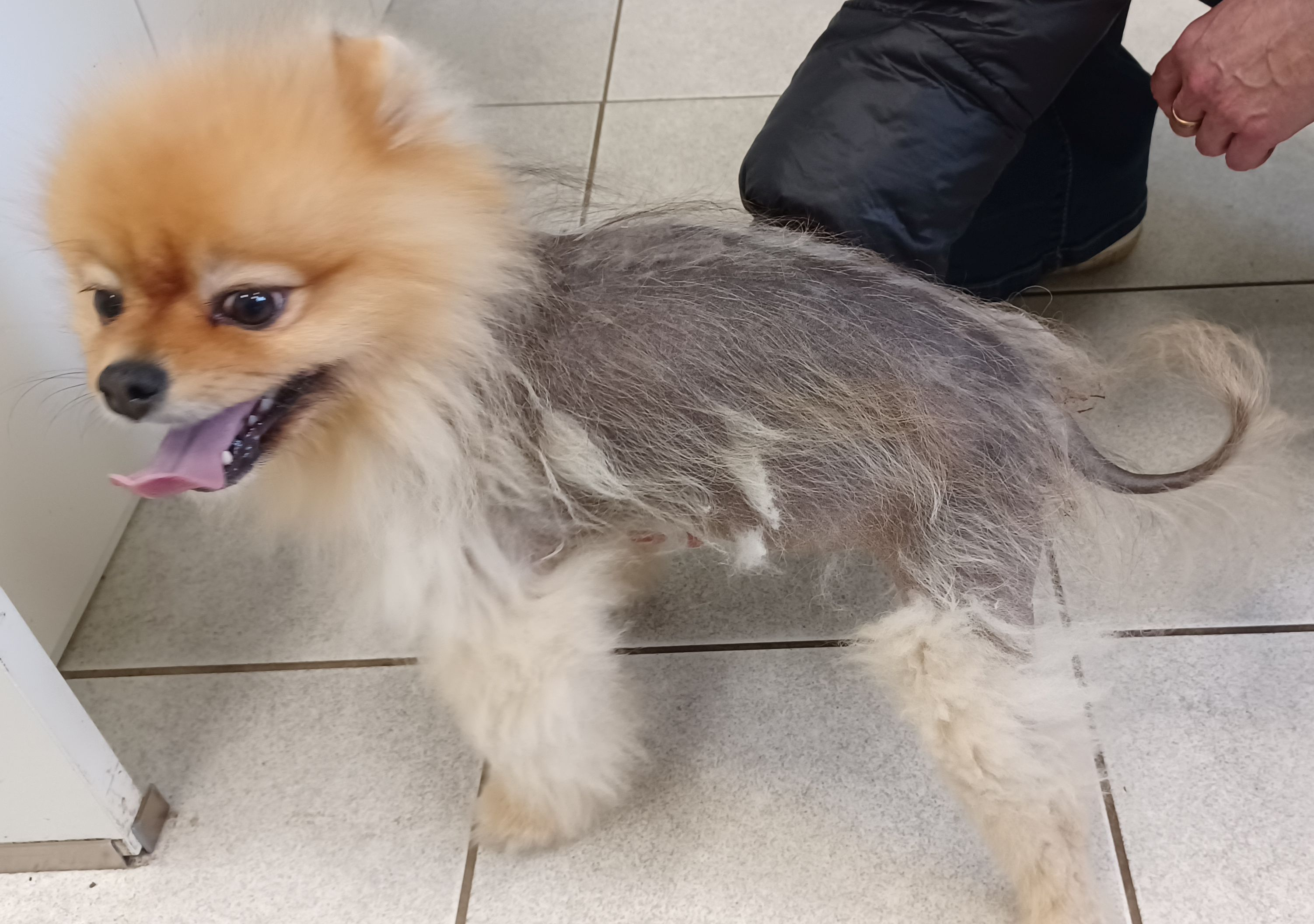
A Pomeranian with alopecia X

Initial signs of alopecia X are hair loss around the collar and rear thighs that slowly progresses to near complete alopecia of the trunk, neck, and proximal legs. The head, distal legs, and distal tail do not experience alopecia. In some cases a sparse wooly coat will remain. Hyperpigmentation develops simultaneously; however it may not occur, especially in white-coated Poodles. Aside from this clinical affects are not notable.

== Diagnosis ==
Diagnosis is done via the exclusion of endocrinopathies, including: hypercortisolism, hypothyroidism, hyperoestrogenism, and hyperprogesteronism (a rare condition in some adrenocortical or testicular tumours), as well as other conditions such as, cyclic flank alopecia, follicular dysplasia, and sebaceous adentitis. A skin biopsy will typically show the same changes as other endocrinopathies. There is no way to consistently and reliably differentiate alopecia X from other conditions. However 'flame follicles' — which are spikes of fused keratin that seem to protrude through the outer root sheath to the vitreous layer that creates a type of 'fiery' effect — appear to be more common in alopecia x than other dermatopathies.

== Treatment ==
Various treatments have been used to treat alopecia X, such as: growth hormones, castration, melatonin, mitotane, and trilostane. Treatment is not always effective, and because hair cycle arrest is a 'cosmetic' disease the risk of treatment needs to be compared to the benefit. Growth hormone treatment can cause iatrogenic diabetes mellitus so other treatments have been investigated. Anecdotal and experimental results have been promising for melatonin, mitotane, and parenteral medroxyprogesterone acetate.
