= Eurasier =

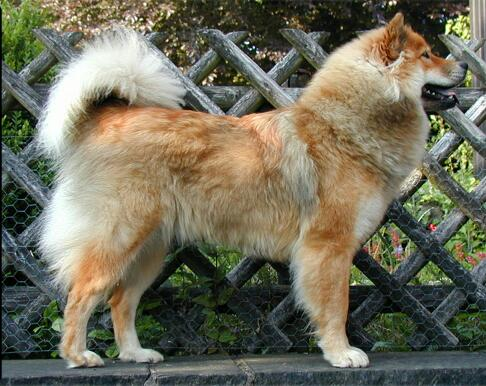
- Eurasier
- Other names: Eurasian; Eurasian Dog
- Origin: Germany
Traits
| Height | Males | 52–60 cm (20–24 in) |
| | Females | 48–56 cm (19–22 in) |
| Weight | Males | 23–32 kg (51–71 lb) |
| | Females | 18–26 kg (40–57 lb) |
- Coat: Long, thick double coat.
- Color: All colors and color combinations are permitted with the exception of pure white, white patches or liver color.
Kennel club standards
- VDH: standard
- Fédération Cynologique Internationale: standard

The Eurasier, or Eurasian, is a spitz type breed of dog that originated in Germany through cross-breeding between popular European and Asian Spitz. It is widely known as a wonderful companion that maintains its own personality, has a dignified reserve with strangers, has a strong bond to its family, and is relatively easy to train.

== Appearance ==
The Eurasier is a balanced, well-constructed, medium-sized Spitz (Spitzen) type dog with prick ears. It comes in different colors: fawn, red, wolf-grey, solid black, and black and tan. All color combinations are allowed, except for pure white, white patches, and liver color. Fédération Cynologique Internationale (FCI) standards call for the Eurasier to have a thick undercoat and medium-long, loosely lying guard hair all over the body, with a short coat on the muzzle, face, ears, and front legs. The tail and the back of the front legs (feathers) and hind legs (breeches) should be covered with long hair. The coat on the Eurasier's neck should be slightly longer than on the body, but not forming a mane. The breed may have a pink, blue-black, or spotted tongue.

The male has a height of 52 to 60 cm (20 to 24 in) at the withers and weighs between 23 and 32 kg (51 and 71 lb) and the female has a height of 48 to 56 cm (19 to 22 in) at the withers and weighs between 18 and 26 kg (40 and 57 lb).

== Temperament ==
Eurasiers are calm, even-tempered dogs. They are watchful and alert, yet reserved towards strangers without being timid or aggressive. Eurasiers form a strong link to their families. For the full development of these qualities, the Eurasier needs constant close contact with its family, combined with understanding, yet consistent, training. They are extremely sensitive to harsh words or discipline and respond best to positive reinforcement. The Eurasier is a combination of the best qualities of the Chow Chow, the Keeshond, and the Samoyed, resulting in a dignified, intelligent breed.

Eurasiers were bred as companion dogs; as such, they do poorly in a kennel environment such as those commonly used for institutionally trained service dogs, nor are they well suited for the social stresses of working as a sled or guard dog. Eurasiers should never be restricted to only a yard, kennel, crate, or chained up. They would pine and become depressed. Within these limitations, Eurasiers can work very well as therapy dogs. This breed enjoys all kinds of activities, especially if the activities involve their family. Eurasiers are calm and quiet indoors; outdoors they are lively and enjoy action.

Eurasia

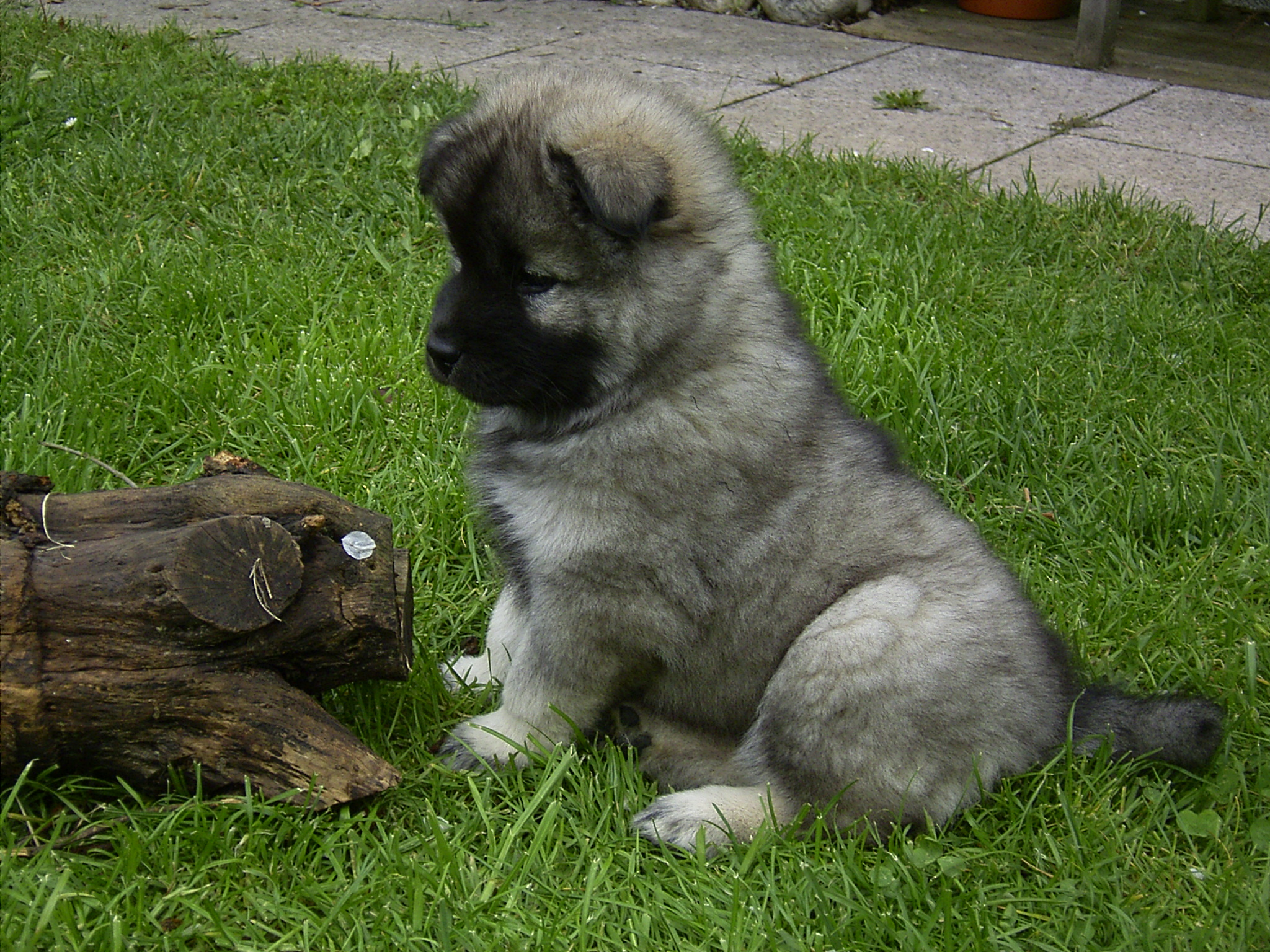
Eurasier puppy with "wolf grey" coat

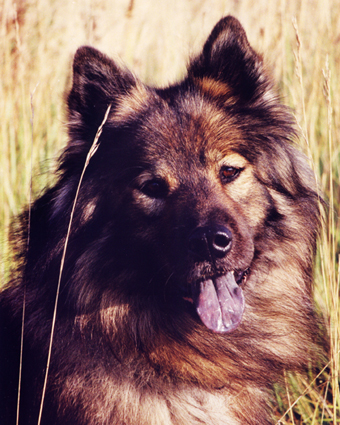

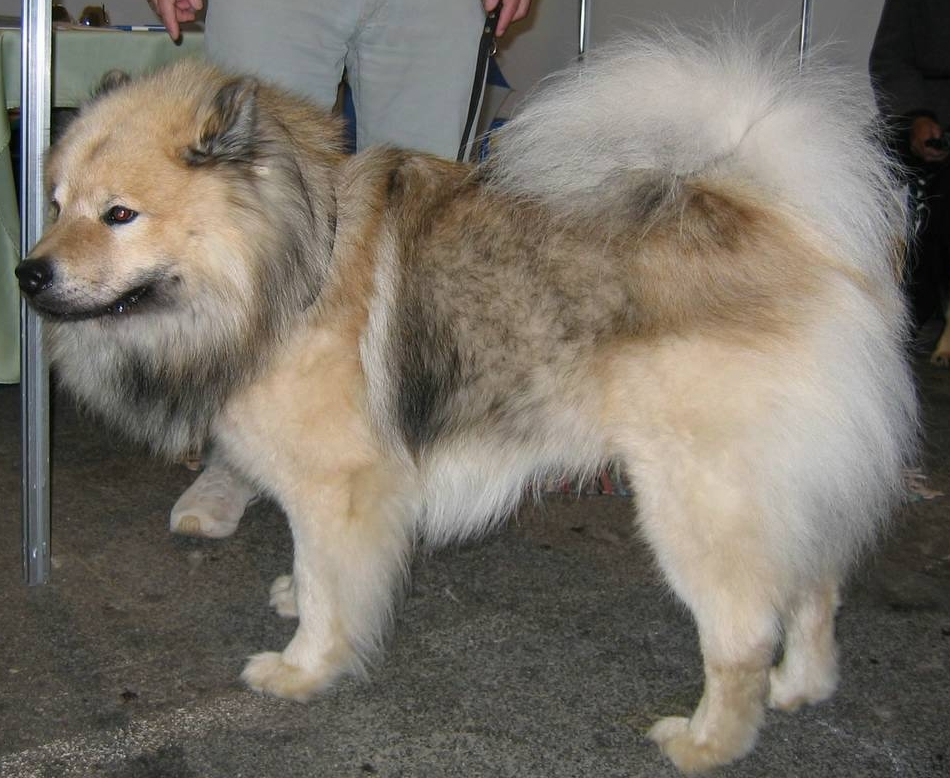

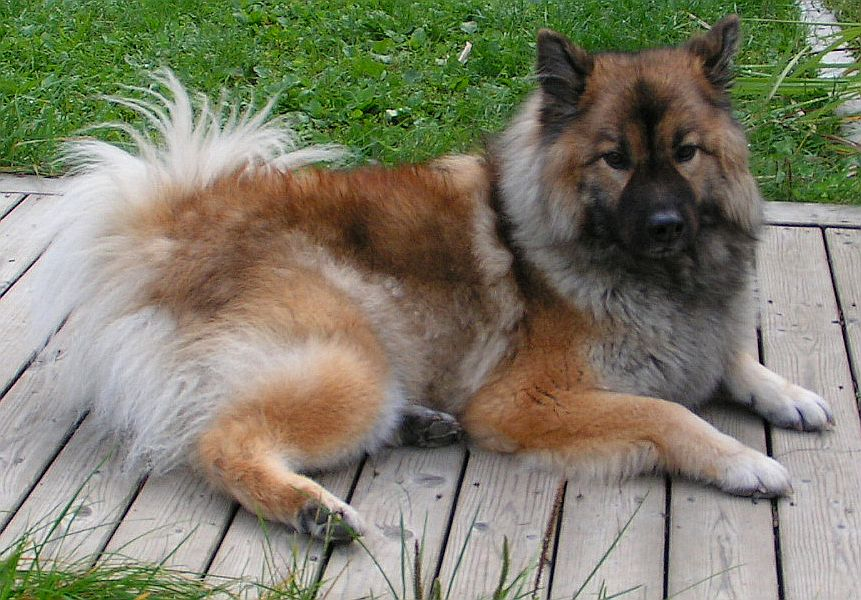

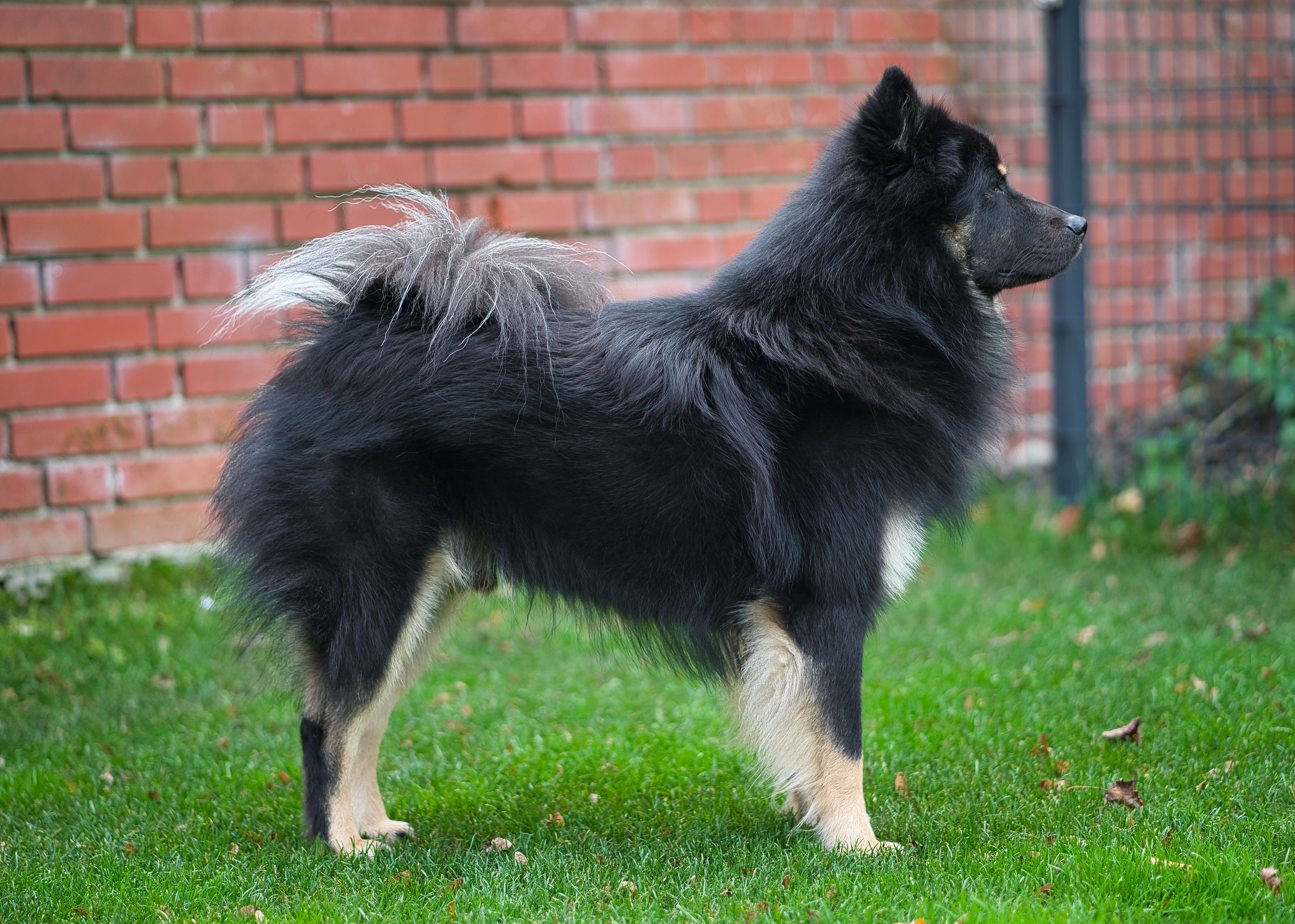
Eurasier with "black and tan" coat

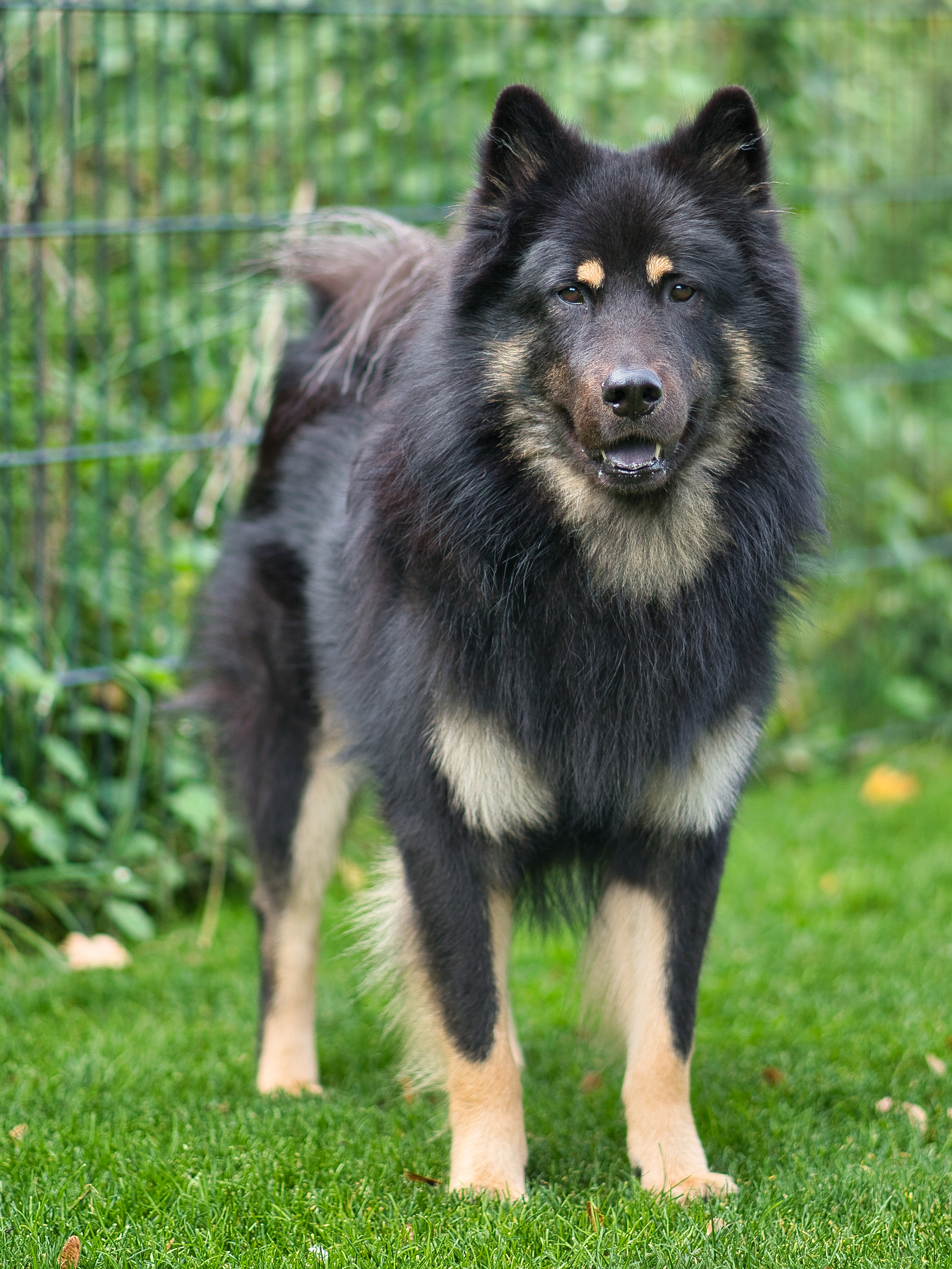
Eurasier with "black and tan" coat

== History ==
Eurasiers originated in Germany in 1960, when the founder, Julius Wipfel, set out together with Charlotte Baldamus and a small group of enthusiasts to create a breed with the best qualities of the Chow Chow and the Wolfspitz. The initial combination of the breeds resulted in what was first called "Wolf-Chow" and then, twelve years later, after crossing with a Samoyed, was renamed "Eurasier" (Eurasian) and recognized by the FCI in 1973. Nobel Laureate Konrad Lorenz obtained a Eurasier puppy from Charlotte Baldamus, Nanette vom Jaegerhof, whom he called "Babett". He thought her character was the best he had ever known in a dog.

Today, unethical breeders sometimes try to pass off a Keeshond/Chow Chow mix as a Eurasier. While they are genetically similar, these mixes cannot be classified as Eurasiers.

The Eurasier breed was recognized by the Canadian Kennel Club (CKC) in 1995 as a member of Group 3 (Working Dogs).

The Kennel Club announced in December 2012 that with effect from April 1, 2013, the Eurasier breed will transfer from the imported register to the breed register.

== Health ==
Eurasiers are generally healthy dogs, though a small gene pool in the breed's early years has led to some hereditary diseases being seen occasionally. Known issues include hip dysplasia, luxating patella, and hypothyroidism, as well as eyelid and lash disorders such as distichiae, entropion, and ectropion.

Ethical preservation breeders will ideally be conducting appropriate health testing as well as achieving titles on their breeding stock in conformation and performance sports, which together demonstrate they are good representatives of the breed standard in health, temperament, and appearance. Health testing requirements should include OFA scores for hips, elbows, patellas, eyes, dentition, Dandy-Walker Like Malformation, and Auto-immune hypothyroiditis. Breeding stock should be tested for hypothyroidism at minimum every two years or should they begin to demonstrate any symptoms. While hypothyroidism can be controlled with medication, dogs or bitches diagnosed with hypothyroidism should not be bred.

== See also ==
- List of dog breeds
