= Chow Chow =

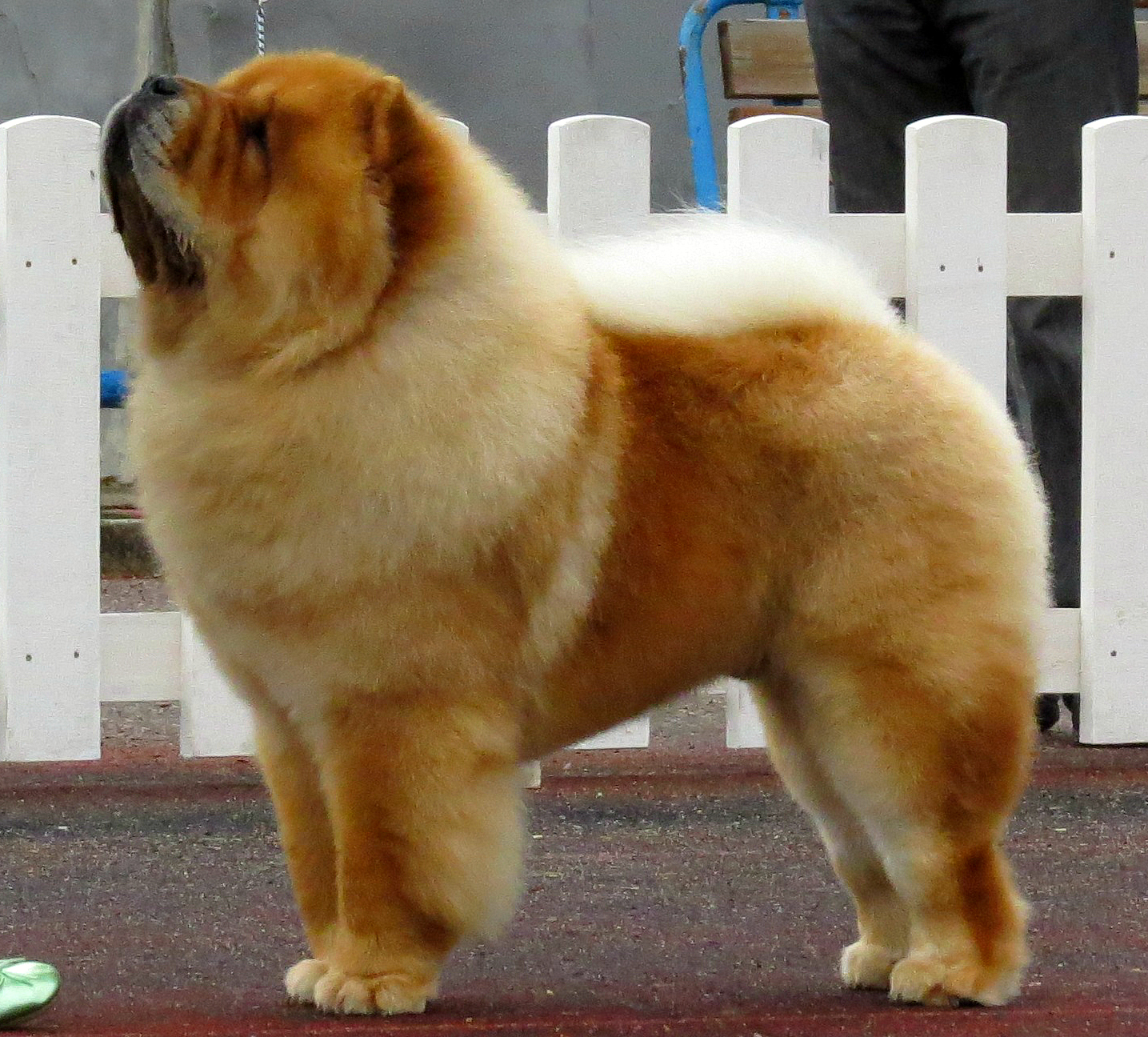
- Chow Chow
- Other names: Chow
- Origin: China
Traits
- Height: 17 to 22 inches (43 to 56 cm)
Weight	Males	40–90 lb (18–41 kg)
	Females	35–85 lb (16–39 kg)
- Coat: Thick and coarse
- Colour: Red (light gold to deep red-brown); Cinnamon (light tan to brown); Black; Cream; White or ivory
- Litter size: 4–7
Kennel club standards
- China Kennel Union: standard
- Fédération Cynologique Internationale: standard

The Chow Chow is a spitz-type of dog breed originally from Northern China. The Chow Chow is a sturdily built dog, square in profile, with a broad skull and small, triangular, erect ears with rounded tips. The breed is known for a very dense double coat that is either smooth or rough. The fur is particularly thick in the neck area, giving it a distinctive ruff or mane appearance. The coat may be shaded/self-red, black, blue, cinnamon/fawn, or cream.

== History ==
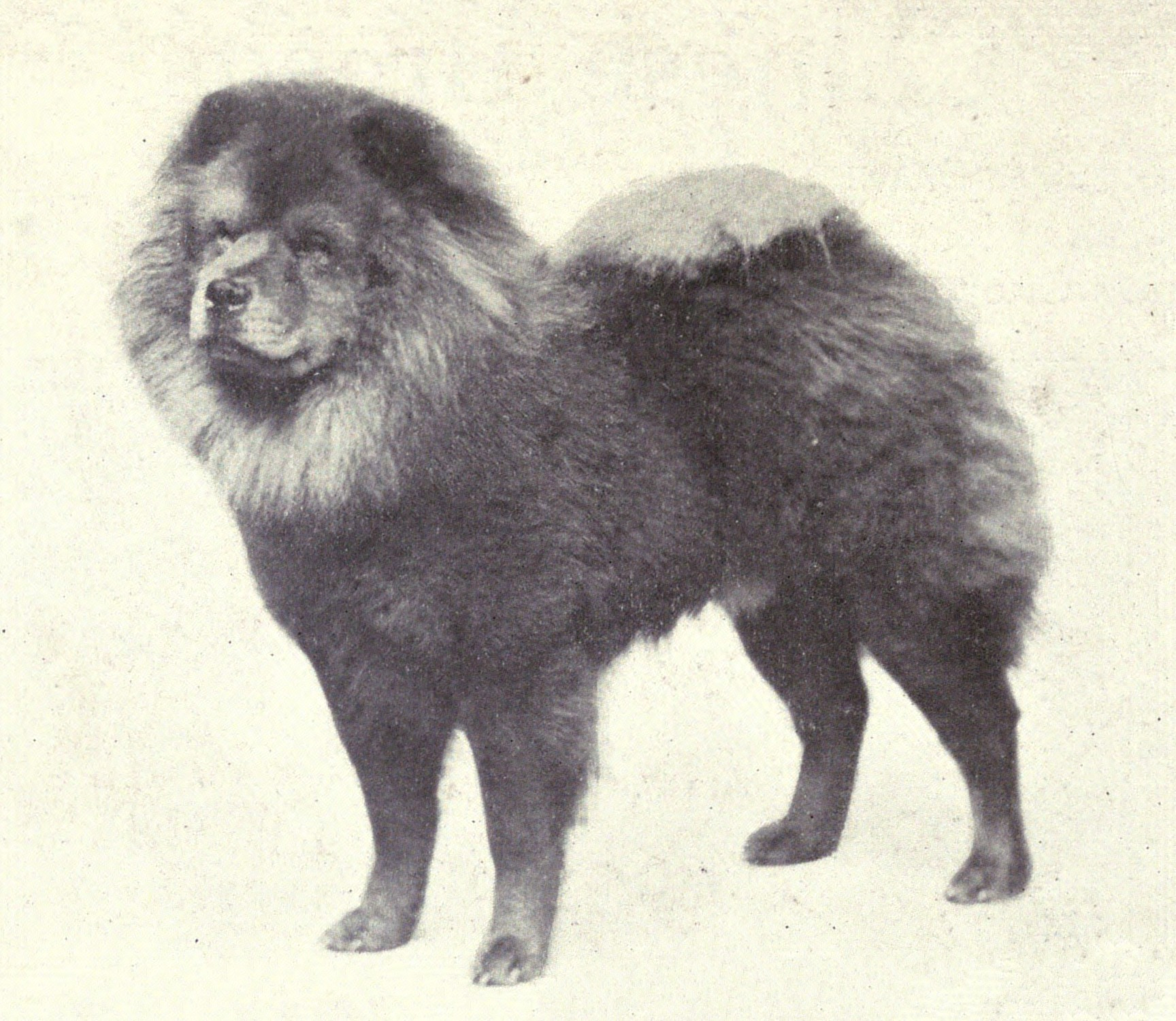
A Chow Chow in 1915

The Chow Chow has been identified as a basal breed that predates the emergence of the modern breeds in the 19th century. A research study has concluded that the Chow Chow dog breed originated from other indigenous dogs in central China about 8,300 years ago. The ancient breed evolved and manifests both morphological and physiological features, including its dark tongue, coat of fur, and stronger build.

One Chinese legend mentions large war dogs from Central Asia that resembled black-tongued lions. One Chinese ruler was said to own 5,000 Chows. The Chinese also used Chows to pull dog sleds through swampy terrain, and this was remarked upon by Marco Polo.

Today, the American Kennel Club registers approximately 10,000 Chow Chows a year. The Canadian Kennel Club registers approximately 350.

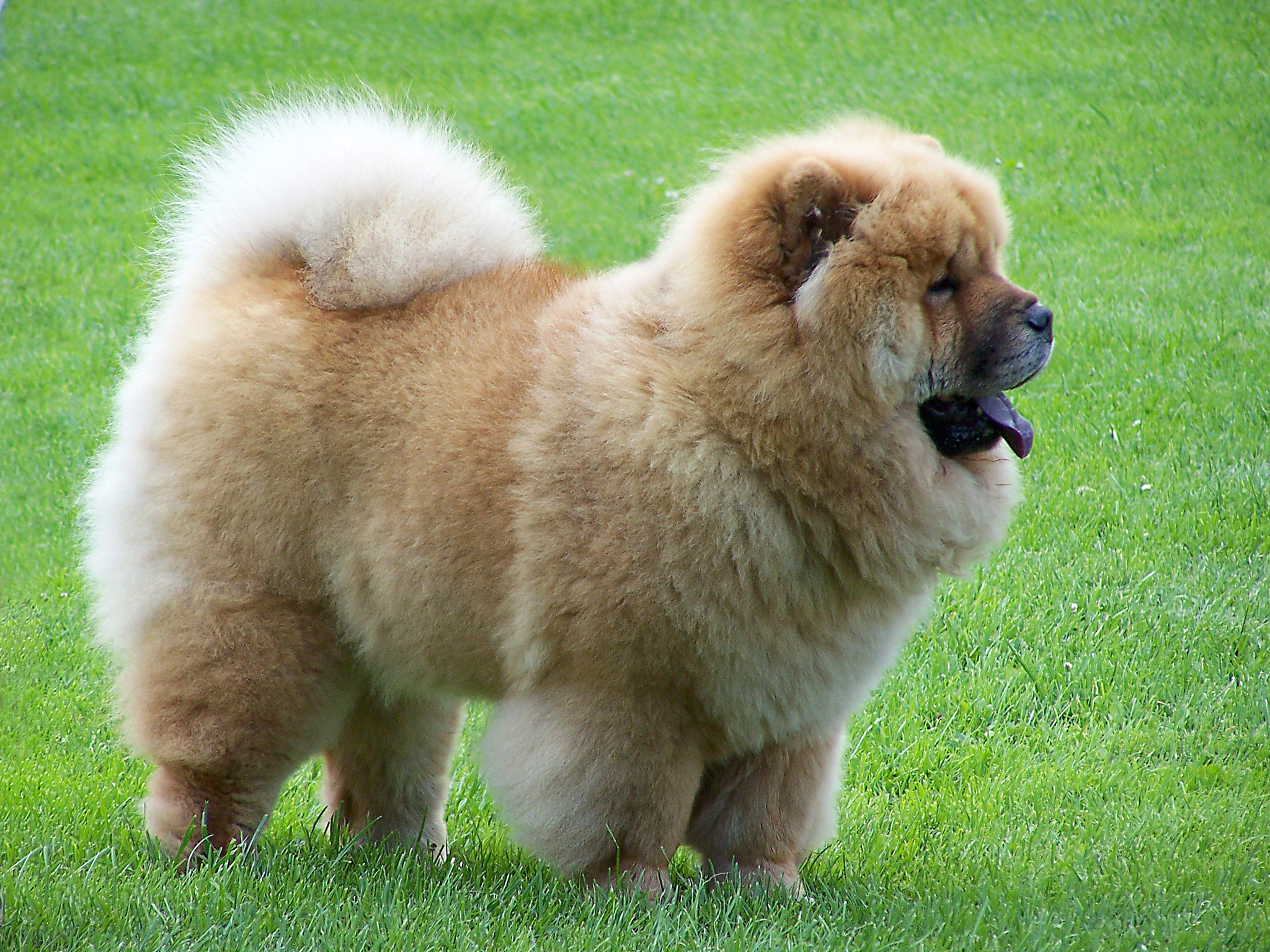
A puppy Chow Chow

The English name Chow Chow is unlinked to any Chinese name such as the modern 鬆獅犬/松狮犬 (sōng shī quǎn, lit. "loose lion dog") for the same breed, and hence of uncertain origin - possible and folk etymologies refer to Pidgin English.

== Appearance ==
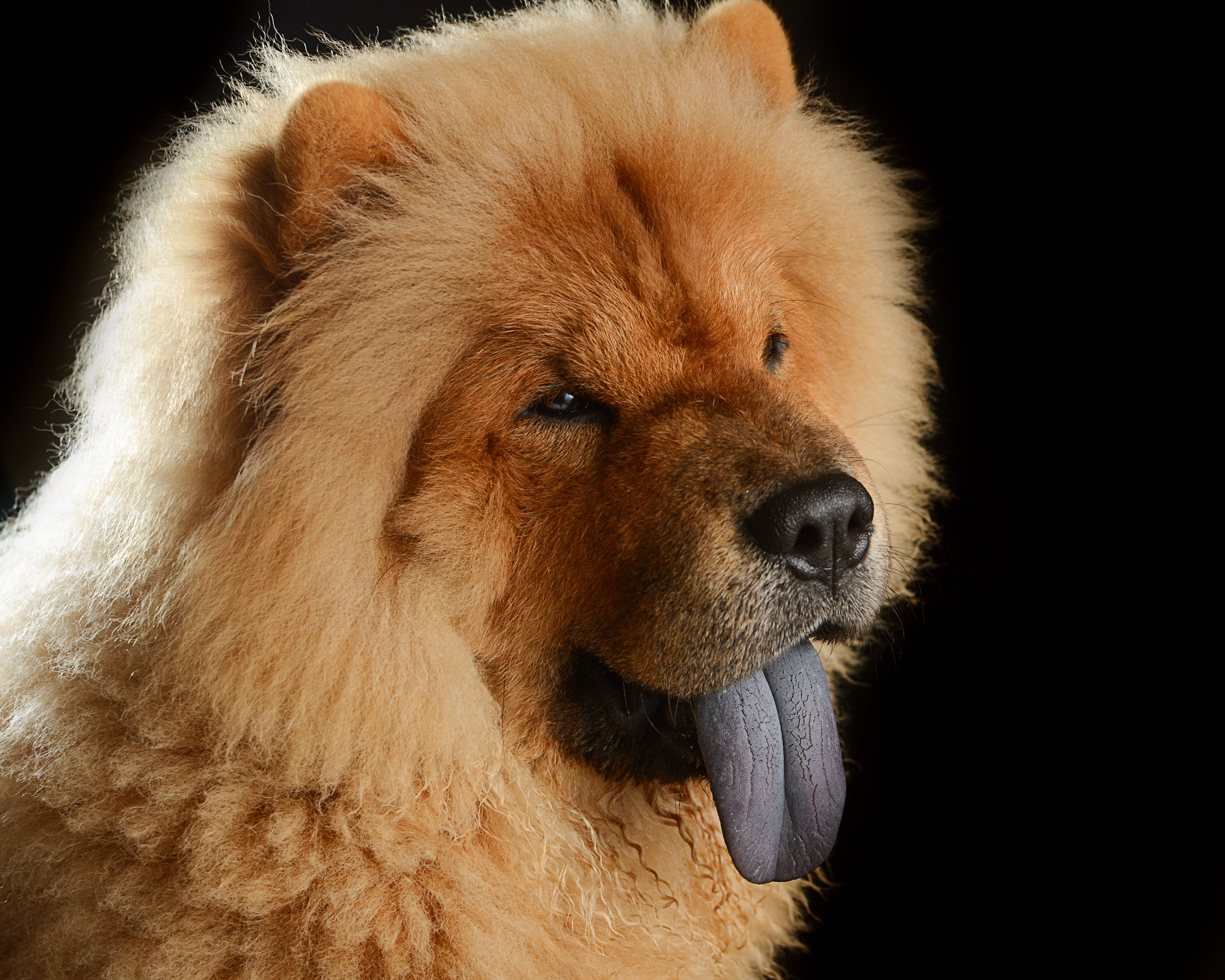
Female Chow Chow, showing characteristic blue-black tongue

The Chow Chow is a sturdily built dog, square in profile, with a broad skull and small, triangular, erect ears with rounded tips. The breed is known for a very dense double coat that is either smooth or rough. The fur is particularly thick in the neck area, giving it a distinctive ruff or mane appearance. The coat may be shaded/self-red, black, blue, cinnamon/fawn, or cream. Not all these color varieties are recognized as valid in all countries. Individuals with patchy or multicolored coats are considered to be outside the breed standard. Chow Chow eyes are typically deep set and almond shaped. The tongue is purple or blue-black; this color extends to the lips. The Chow Chow is the only dog breed with this distinctive bluish color in its lips and oral cavity; other dogs have black or a piebald pattern skin in their mouths. The hind legs are very straight, resulting in a rather stilted gait. Another distinctive feature is the curly tail. It has thick hair and lies curled on its back. The nose should be black, but blue-coated Chow Chow can have a solid blue or slate-colored nose. According to the American Kennel Club breed standards, any other tone is not acceptable for contests. FCI countries, however, do allow a self-colored nose in the cream.

The blue-black/purple tongue gene appears to be dominant, as most mixed breed dogs that come from a Chow Chow retain that tongue color. However, the blue-black/purple tongue can also be found on the Shar Pei. This is not to say that every mixed breed dog with spots of purple on the tongue is descended from Chow Chow, as purple spots on the tongue can be found on other purebred dogs.

== Temperament ==
Owning a Chow Chow can raise the cost of homeowners' insurance in the US because some companies consider them high-risk dogs. In a study in the Journal of the American Veterinary Medical Association, Chow Chow were responsible for 8 out of 238 fatalities related to dog bites from 1979 to 1998.

== Colors ==
Chow Chows can come in a variety of coat colors. The American Kennel Club (AKC) has classified Chow Chow colors as either standard or non-standard (rare colors). The standard colors for Chow Chows are black, blue, red, cream, and cinnamon. However, colors such as fawn, white, and merle are not considered standard for this breed.

Different canine clubs worldwide may acknowledge different coat colors or even use alternative names for the colors mentioned above.

The different Chow Chow colors

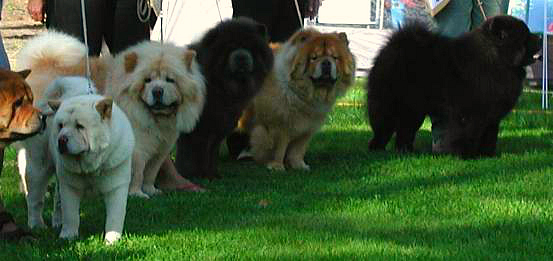
5 Chow Chows of different coat colors

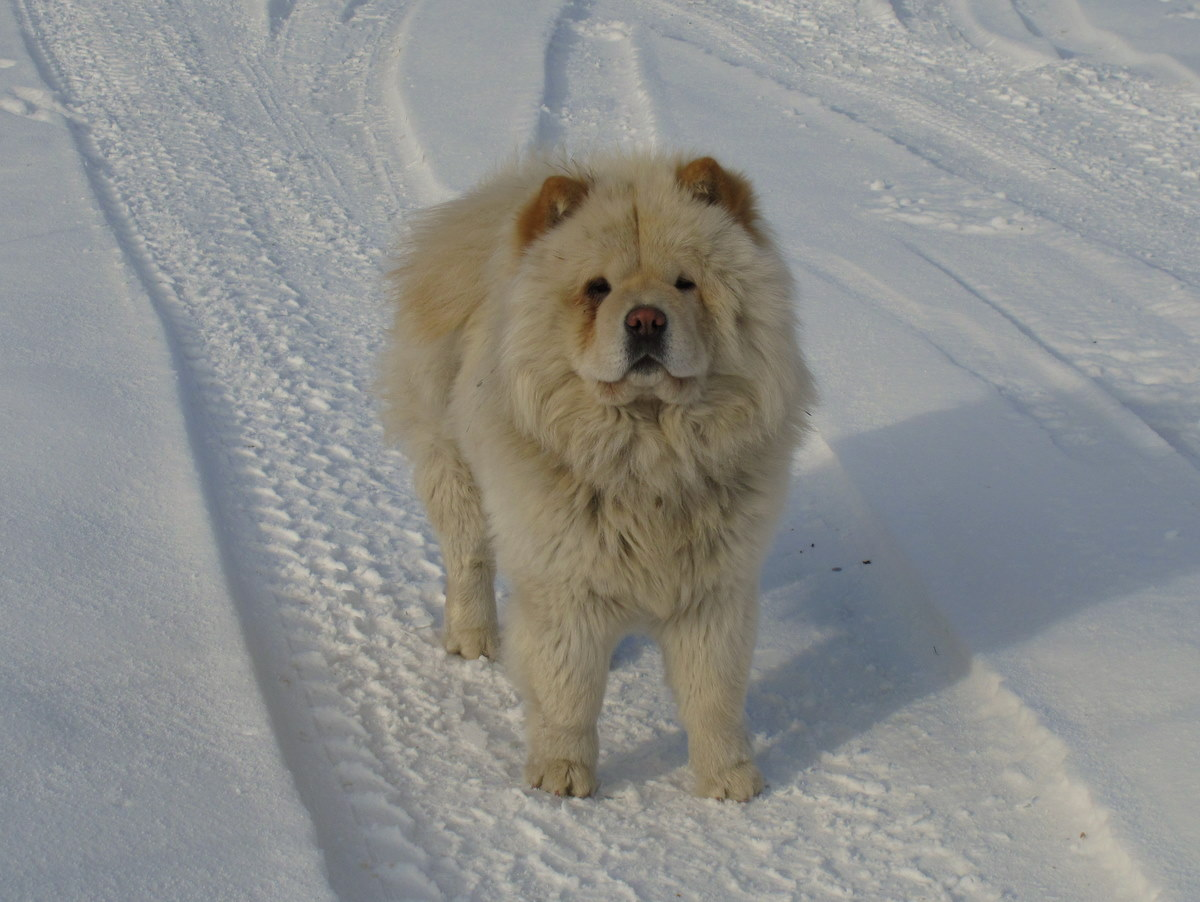
Cream

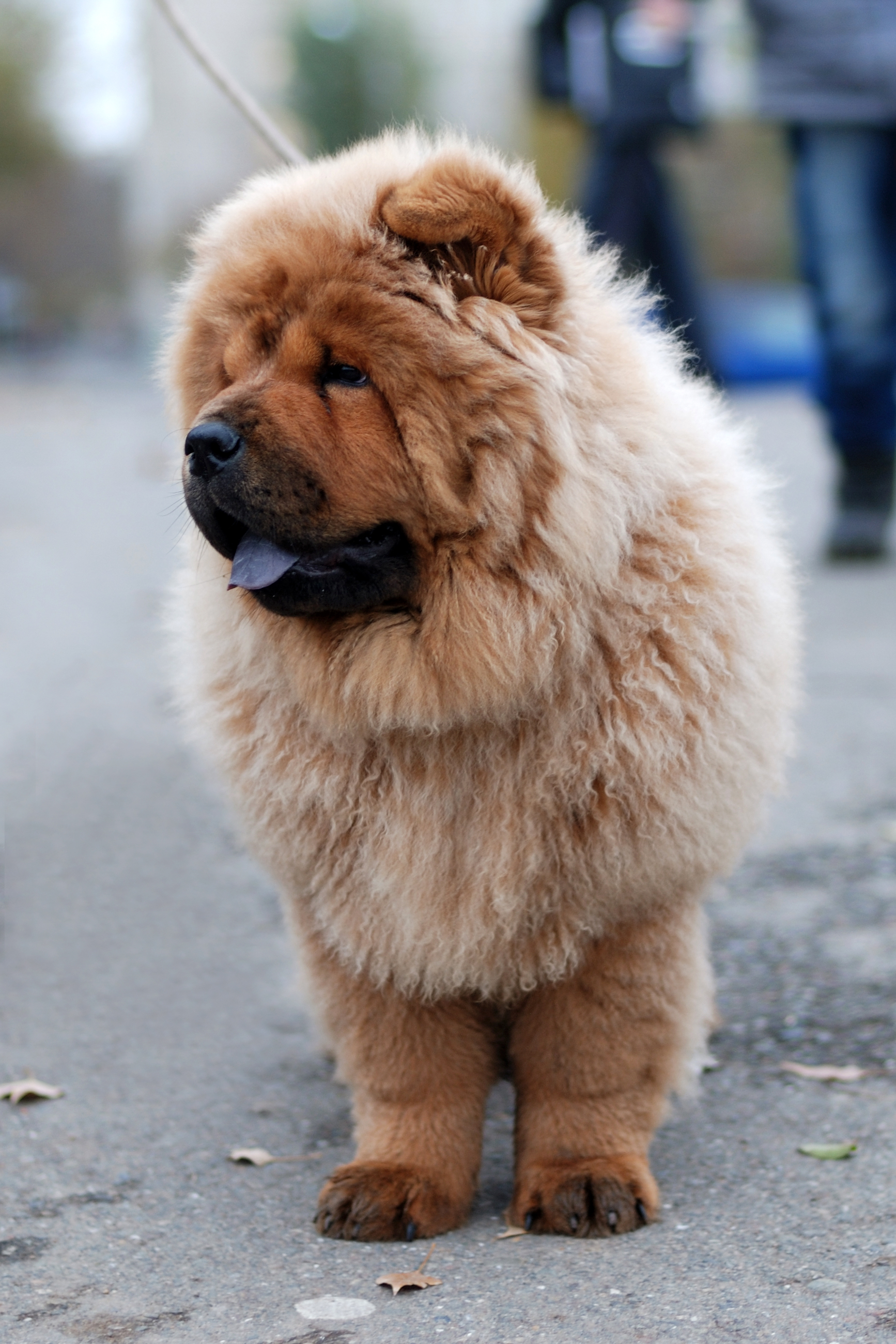
Fawn

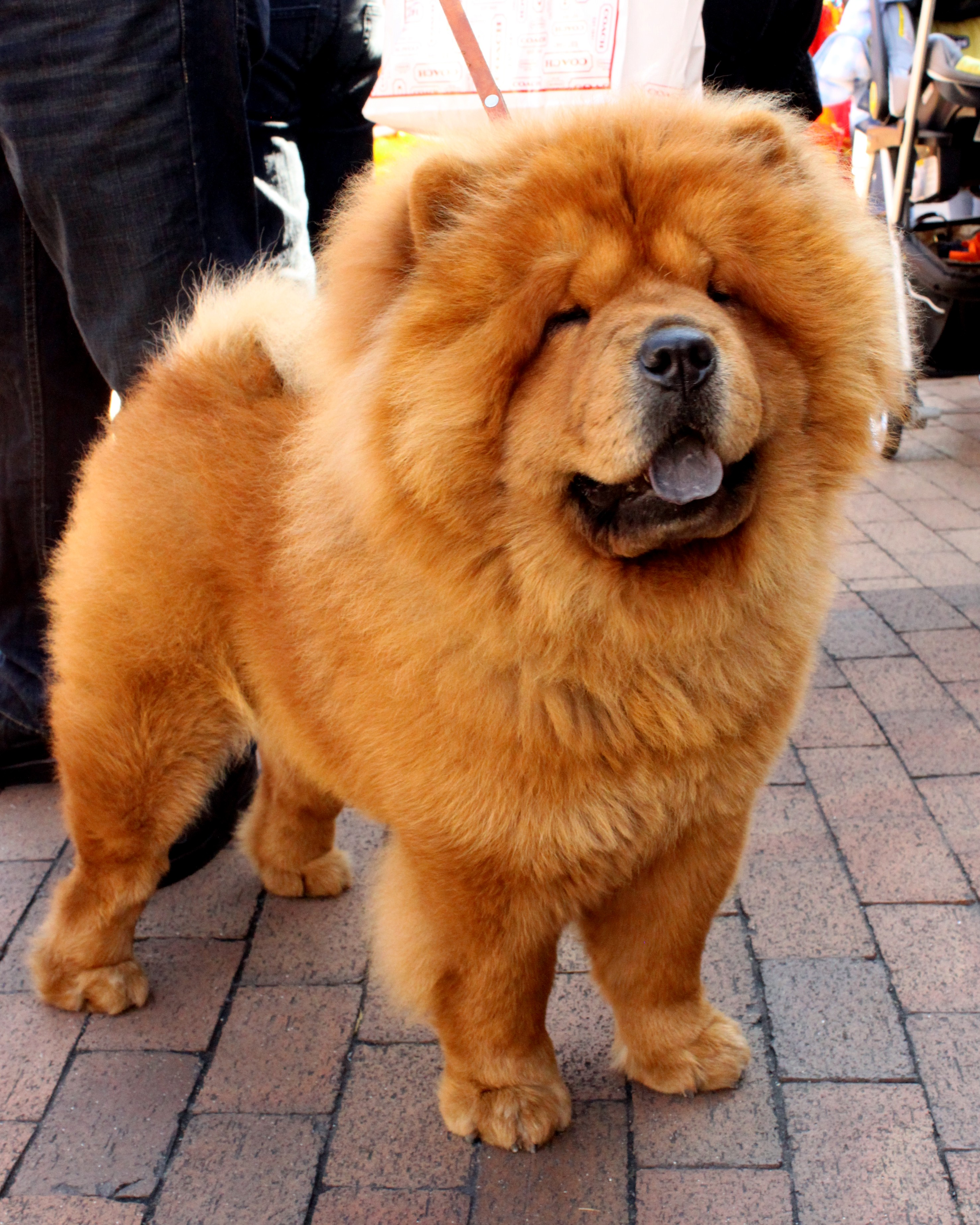
Red

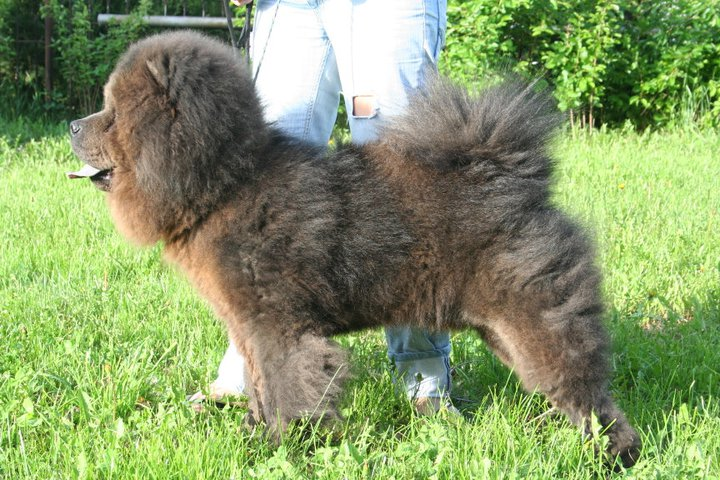
Blue

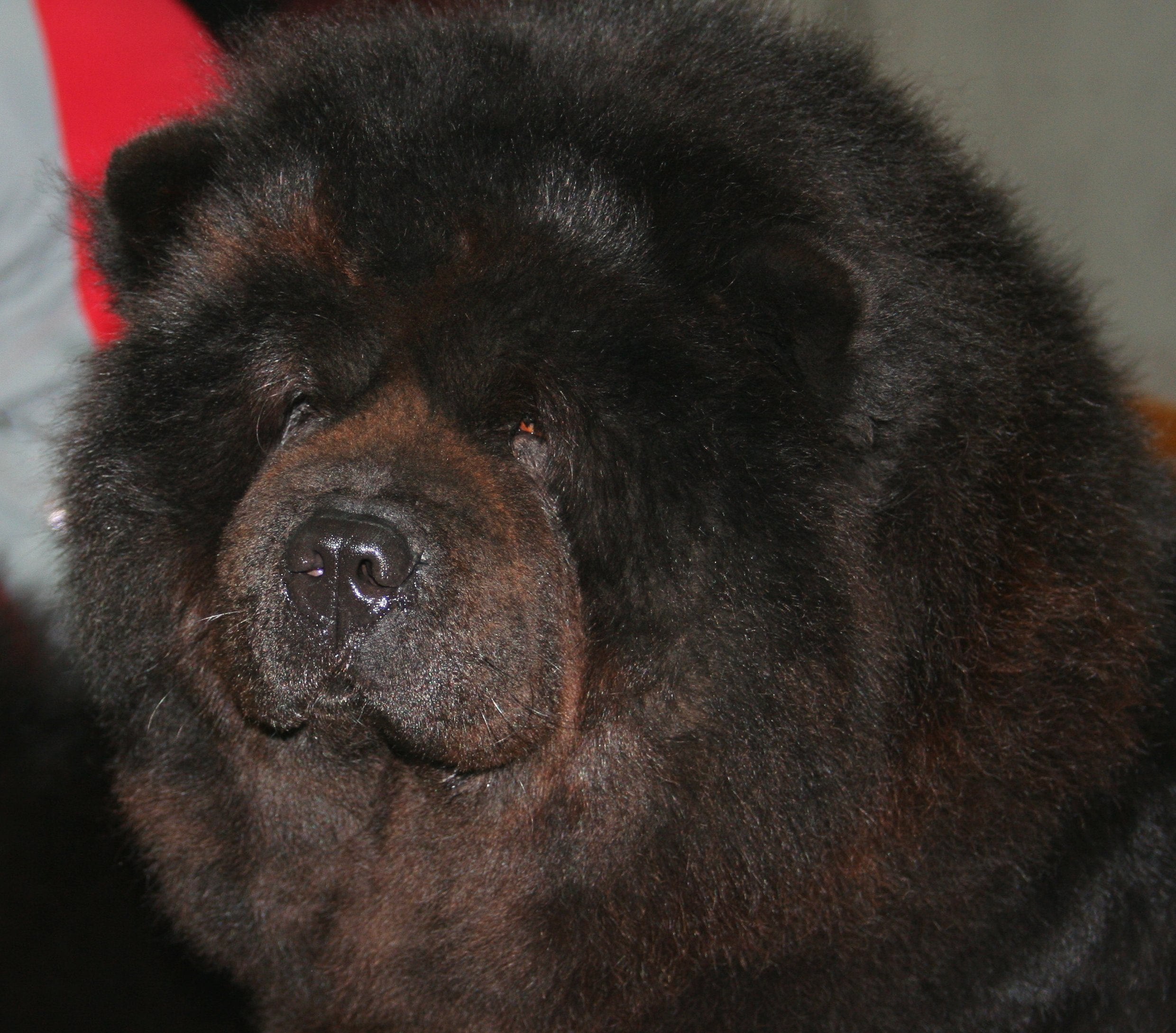
Black

== Health ==
A UK study found the life expectancy of the Chow Chow to be 12.1 years, just higher than the 12 year average for crossbreeds and lower than the 12.7 years average for purebreeds.

=== Skeletal conditions ===
A North American study looking at more than a million records of dogs found 6.44% of Chow Chow dogs to have hip dysplasia compared with 3.52% overall. The study also found 4.3% of Chow Chow dogs to have cranial cruciate ligament deficiency compared to 2.52% overall.

Another North American study looking at more than 250,000 elbow scans found the Chow Chow to have the highest prevalence of elbow dysplasia, with 48.6% of dogs over the age of 2 having elbow dysplasia.

=== Ophthalmological conditions ===
A North American study looking at glaucoma in dog breeds found the Chow Chow to have the third highest prevalence with 4.7% of Chow Chow dogs having glaucoma compared to 0.89% overall.

=== Dermatological conditions ===
A study looking at records from a small animal clinic at the University of Montreal found the Chow Chow to be predisposed to alopecia X.

A review of studies in Australia found the Chow Chow to be prediposed to atopic dermatitis with a 7.1 odds ratio.

A US case study found a predisposition to pemphigus foliaceus with an odds ratio of 12.3.

A breed specific mutation causing tyrosinase deficiency which results in leukotrichia exists in the Chow Chow.

=== Gastrointestinal conditions ===
A UK study looking at exocrine pancreatic insufficiency in breeds found the Chow Chow to be predisposed to the condition.

=== Neoplastic conditions ===
An Austrian case series found an odds ratio of 23.53 for contracting stomach cancer.

A US study looking at cases of oral melanoma found the breed to be over-represented with an odds ratio of 7.89.

=== Reproductive conditions ===
In a Belgian study Chow Chow bitches made up 6.4% of cases of pyometra despite the breed making up 1.6% of the population. Pyometra was found to be more extreme in the breed with anaemia and endotoxaemia reported.

=== Other conditions ===
The Chow Chow can suffer from diabetes mellitus, and gastric cancer. Chow Chows are a high risk breed for autoimmune disease.

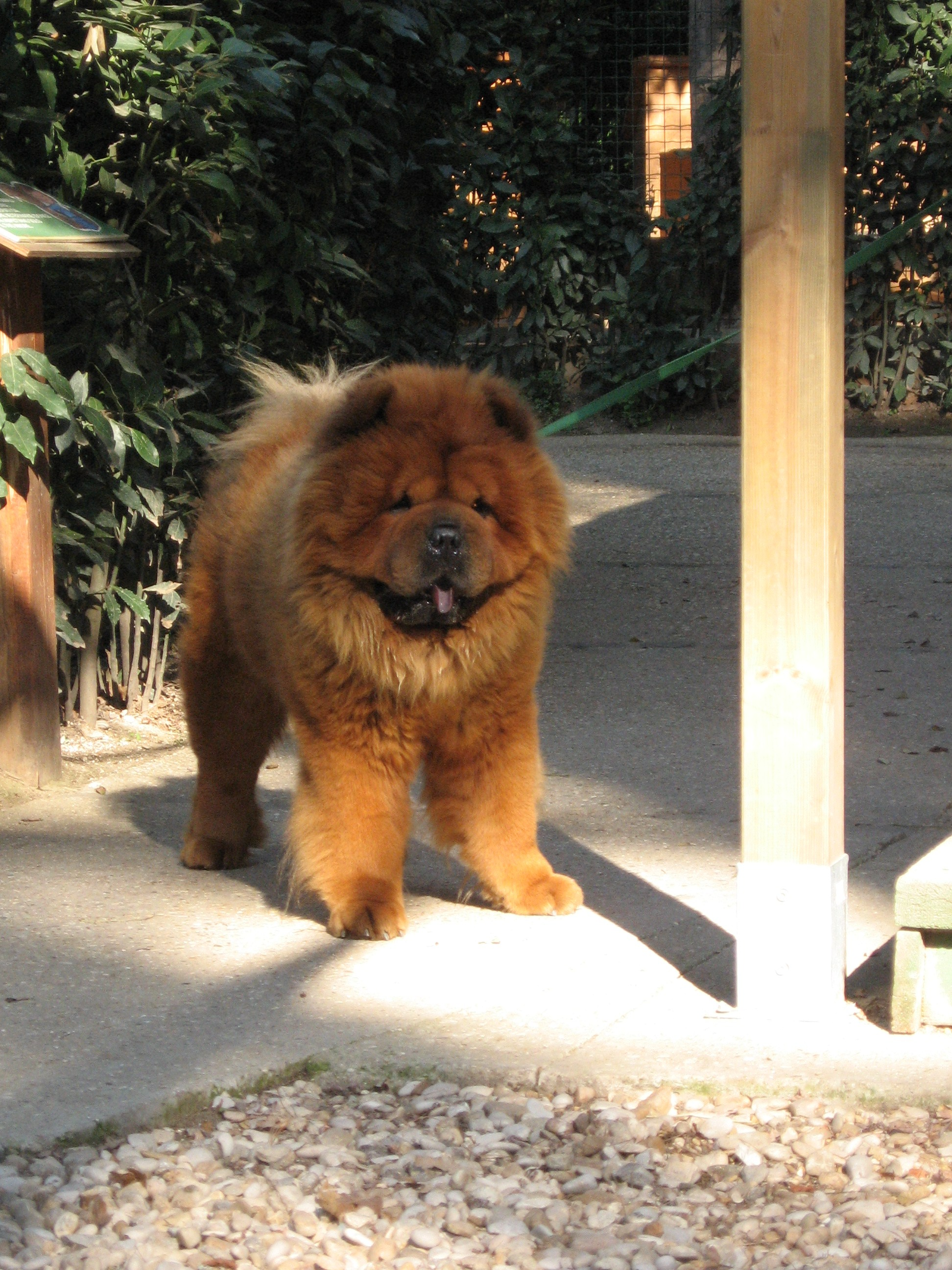
A Chow Chow with reddish coat

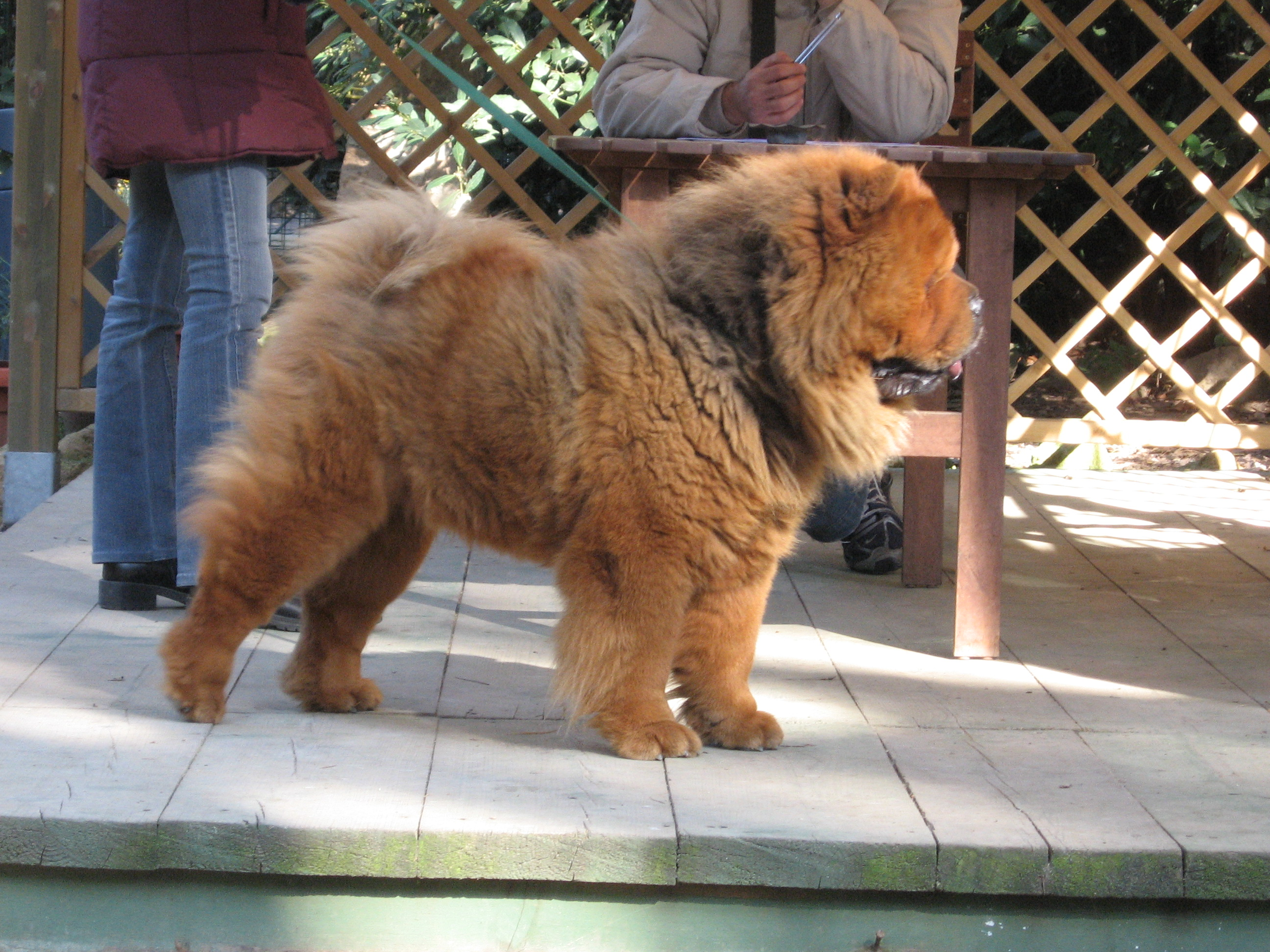
The Chow Chow's fur is particularly thick in the neck area, giving it a distinctive ruff or mane appearance.

== Notable dogs ==
Sigmund Freud had a Chow Chow named Jofi who attended all of his therapy sessions because he felt that dogs had a special sense that allows them to judge a person's character accurately, and admitted he depended on Jofi for an assessment of a patient's mental state.

== See also ==
- List of dog breeds
- Eurasier, a dog-breed created through crossing Chow Chow, Wolfspitz and Samoyed dog
- Tibetan Mastiff
