= Jofi =

Chow Chow dog owned by Sigmund Freud

Jofi, also known as Yofi (1928 – January 11, 1937), was a Chow Chow dog owned by Sigmund Freud, the founder of psychoanalysis. Known for her significant role in Freud's personal life, Jofi is often cited as an early example of the therapeutic benefits of the human-animal bond. Her companionship with Freud, particularly during his later years, highlights the influence of pets on psychological well-being and has been linked to the early development of animal-assisted therapy. Jofi's presence and behavior also contributed to Freud's understanding of non-verbal communication in therapy settings. American Kennel Club included Jofi in its list of the most important female dogs in history.

== Origins ==
Sigmund Freud did not have any dogs until he was in his seventies. His significant connection with dogs began in the mid-1920s when his daughter, Anna Freud, acquired a German Shepherd named Wolf. Initially intended as a companion for Anna, Freud grew attached to the dog, leading to a notable change in his lifestyle and interests. In 1925, Anna Freud humorously referenced this newfound affection in a birthday note to her father, mentioning that she brought a picture of Wolf as a gift, playfully suggesting Freud's interest had shifted from her to the dog. Explaining why Freud didn't become interested in dogs until later in life, his biographer Ernest Jones wrote, "In the Europe of Freud’s era, Jewish families, like Freud’s, typically did not have close contact with dogs. For them, dogs had fearful associations; for instance, anti-Semites had used attack dogs during the pogroms. The fact that Freud may have overcome some cultural and cognitive inertia to welcome Wolf into his family lends some nuance to his relationship with canines... it became easier to look away from one’s fellowmen and turn to animals."

Freud's engagement with dogs deepened in 1928 when Dorothy Burlingham, a friend of Anna, gifted him a Chow Chow named Lün-Yu. Unfortunately, this relationship was short-lived as Lün-Yu died 15 months later, having been hit by a train. Freud's response to this event was one of profound grief, akin to mourning a human loss.

After a period of seven months, Freud welcomed another Chow Chow, Jofi, who was Lün-Yu's sister, into his household. Freud, proficient in Hebrew, named the dog Jofi, which translates to "beauty" (Hebrew: יופי). During the early 1930s, as Freud's professional relationships and friendships underwent significant changes, with many colleagues either passing away, moving abroad, or becoming estranged, Jofi became an increasingly important presence in his life. She became Freud's constant companion. This period coincided with a phase in Freud's life where he reportedly exhibited uncharacteristic irritability towards his wife, Martha, an indication of broader personal dissatisfaction.

== Role in Freud's personal life ==
Shortly after Jofi arrived, he began to express a deep connection with her. He likened his fondness for Jofi to that of his enjoyment of cigars, noting her distinct personality traits. During a period when Freud had to travel to Berlin for medical treatment related to his cancerous jaw, Jofi was placed in kennels, as his wife Martha did not share his affection for dogs. Freud's correspondence with Martha during this time reflected his longing for Jofi, "Is anyone visiting Jofi? I miss her a great deal."

At the Freud family home, Jofi was an integral part of daily life. Freud would often share his meals with her, a practice that contributed to Jofi's physical appearance. As Freud's health declined due to cancer, Jofi remained a constant presence, even participating in his professional activities. Freud often experienced pain when eating due to his diseased jaw, Jofi often ended up eating all his dinner. Additionally, Jofi provided emotional support to Freud during his numerous medical procedures. Freud communicated to Princess Marie Bonaparte, a friend, about Jofi's empathetic behavior during his challenging health episodes, suggesting a deep bond between them, "I wish you could have seen with me what sympathy Jofi shows me during these hellish days, as if she understood everything."

Jofi had a litter of puppies in 1931, but only one survived. The puppy, named Tatoun, died of distemper in 1931. In 1933, Jofi had another litter of puppies, but this time they were all eaten by Jofi. Jofi had a series of ovarian cysts removed in January 1937. The surgery was successful, but she died of a heart attack three days later on January 11, 1937. Freud was devastated by Jofi's death. He wrote to his friend Arnold Zweig, "Apart from any mourning, it is very unreal, and one wonders when one will get used to it. But, of course, one cannot easily get over seven years of intimacy." Freud had Jofi's body cremated and her ashes scattered in the garden of his home.

== Role in Freud's therapy sessions ==
Jofi played a significant role in his therapy sessions. Freud believed dogs possessed an innate ability to understand humans, and he utilized Jofi's presence to assess his patients. Patients tended to be more forthcoming when Jofi was around, and Freud noticed her uncanny ability to sense whether they were anxious or relaxed.

Jofi's calming presence in the therapy room helped alleviate tension and create a welcoming atmosphere. She was non-judgmental and served as an attentive listener, providing comfort and support to Freud's patients. Freud also used Jofi's behavior as a tool to study his patients. By observing her reactions to different individuals, he gained insights into their psychological states. Freud often talked through Jofi. Dr. Grinker wrote that if she scratched to be let out, Freud would say, "Jofi doesn't approve of what you're saying." And if she wanted back in, he'd say, "Jofi has decided to give you another chance."

Jofi's remarkable sense of time also proved useful in Freud's practice. She would yawn and head towards the door precisely at the 50-minute mark, signaling the end of the session. This consistent behavior helped Freud maintain punctuality and adhere to the standard duration of his sessions.

Freud's patients often expressed their appreciation for Jofi's presence in the therapy room. They found her calming demeanor and non-judgmental nature conducive to opening up and sharing their innermost thoughts and feelings. Freud wrote, "Dogs love their friends and bite their enemies, quite unlike people, who are incapable of pure love and always have to mix love and hate in their object relations."

Jofi's unique contributions to Freud's psychoanalytic practice highlight the remarkable bond between humans and animals. Her ability to create a safe and supportive environment for patients and her keen intuition regarding their emotional states made her an invaluable asset to Freud's work.

While Jofi is not directly mentioned in Freud's major psychoanalytic theories, her presence in his life provided Freud with a deeper understanding of instinctual behavior, indirectly influencing his work. Freud's relationship with Jofi and his other dogs is a subject of interest among scholars for its potential influence on his theories. Jofi is recognized for her contribution to the early stages of animal-assisted therapy. Her companionship with Freud serves as an early example of the therapeutic potential of the human-animal bond, offering insight into a personal facet of Freud's life.

== Successor ==
In 1937, following the death of Jofi, Sigmund Freud acquired another chow, whom he also named Jofi. The subsequent year, amidst rising Nazi persecution, the Freud family relocated from Vienna to London. Their new residence later became known as the Freud Museum. After enduring a six-month quarantine, Jofi II was reunited with Freud, an event that garnered attention from the local press in London. Freud died shortly after in 1939 at the age of 83. Jofi II outlived him by several years.

== In popular culture ==
Jofi's story and her relationship with Freud have been featured in various media, including print and video. These portrayals often focus on the unique bond between Freud and his pet, emphasizing the impact of Jofi on Freud's personal and professional life.

- In the 1997 book What Do Dogs Know? by Stanley Coren, he writes about how Freud used Jofi to help him assess his patients.
- In the 2001 play Freud's Last Session, Jofi is mentioned as being a source of comfort for Freud during his final days.

== See also ==
- List of individual dogs
