= Pomeranian dog =

Dog breed

Pomeranian
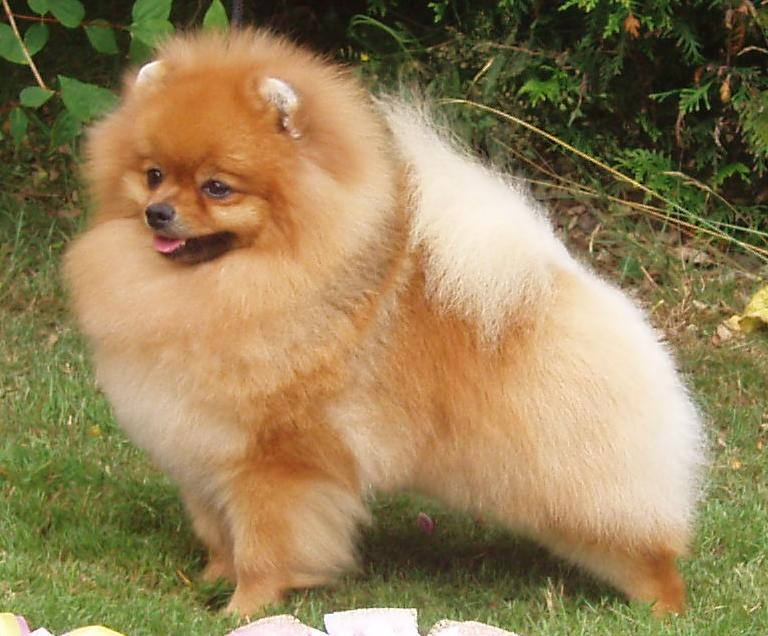
- Other names: Pom; Dwarf Spitz; German Toy Spitz
- Common nicknames: Pom Dog; Pom-Pom; Pom; Zwers
- Origin: Pomerania
Traits
- Height: 7 to 12 inches (18 to 30 cm)
- Weight: 3 to 7 pounds (1.4 to 3.2 kg)
Kennel club standards
- VDH: standard
- Fédération Cynologique Internationale: standard

The Pomeranian (also known as a Pom, Pommy or Pome) is a breed of dog of the Spitz type that is named for the Pomerania region in north-west Poland and north-east Germany in Central Europe. Classed as a toy dog breed because of its small size, the Pomeranian is descended from larger Spitz-type dogs, specifically the German Spitz.

The breed has been made popular by a number of royal owners since the 18th century. Queen Victoria owned a particularly small Pomeranian, and consequently, the smaller variety became universally popular. During Victoria's lifetime alone, the size of the breed decreased by half. As of 2017, in terms of registration figures, since at least 1998, the breed has ranked among the top fifty most popular breeds in the United States, and the current fashion for small dogs has increased their popularity worldwide.

== Appearance ==
Pomeranians are small dogs weighing 1.36–3.17 kilograms (3.0–7.0 lb) and standing 8–14 inches (20–36 cm) high at the withers. They are compact but sturdy dogs with an abundant textured coat with a highly plumed tail set high and flat. The top coat forms a ruff of fur on the neck, which Poms are well known for, and they also have a fringe of feathery hair on the hindquarters.

The earliest examples of the breed were white or occasionally brown or black. Queen Victoria adopted a small red Pomeranian in 1888, which caused that color to become fashionable by the end of the 19th century. In modern times, the Pomeranian comes in the widest variety of colors of any dog breed, including white, black, brown, red, orange, cream, blue, sable, black and tan, brown and tan, spotted, brindle, parti, and blue Merle, plus combinations of those colors. The most common colors are orange, black, and cream/white.

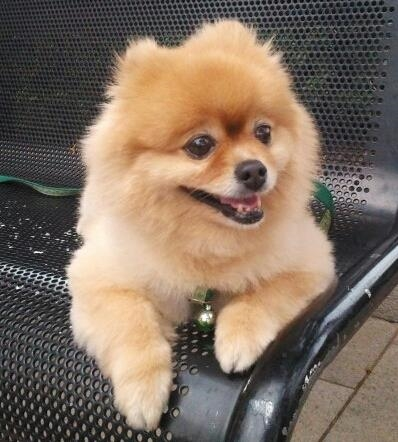
Cream-colored Pomeranian

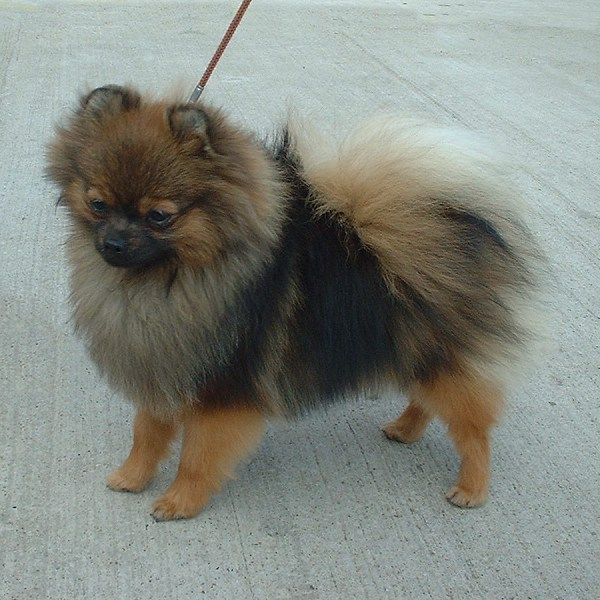
Orange sable Pomeranian

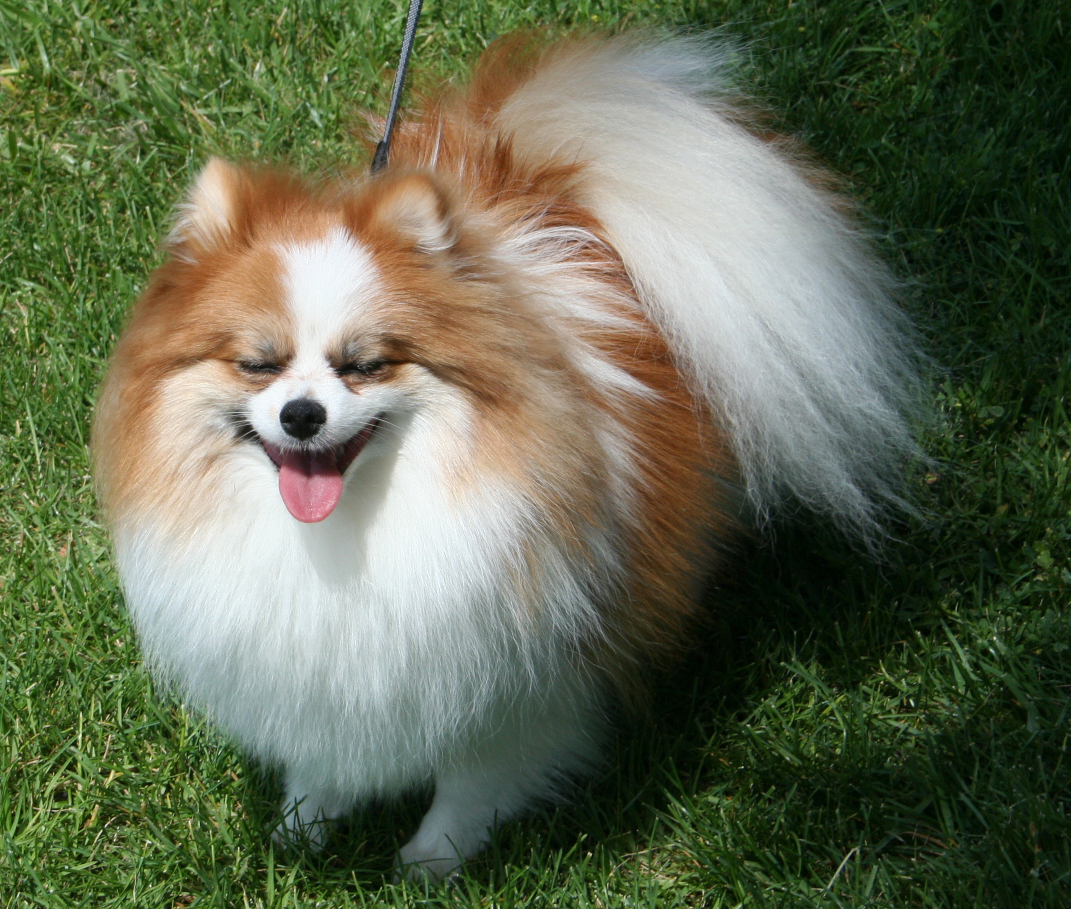
Tri-colored Pomeranian

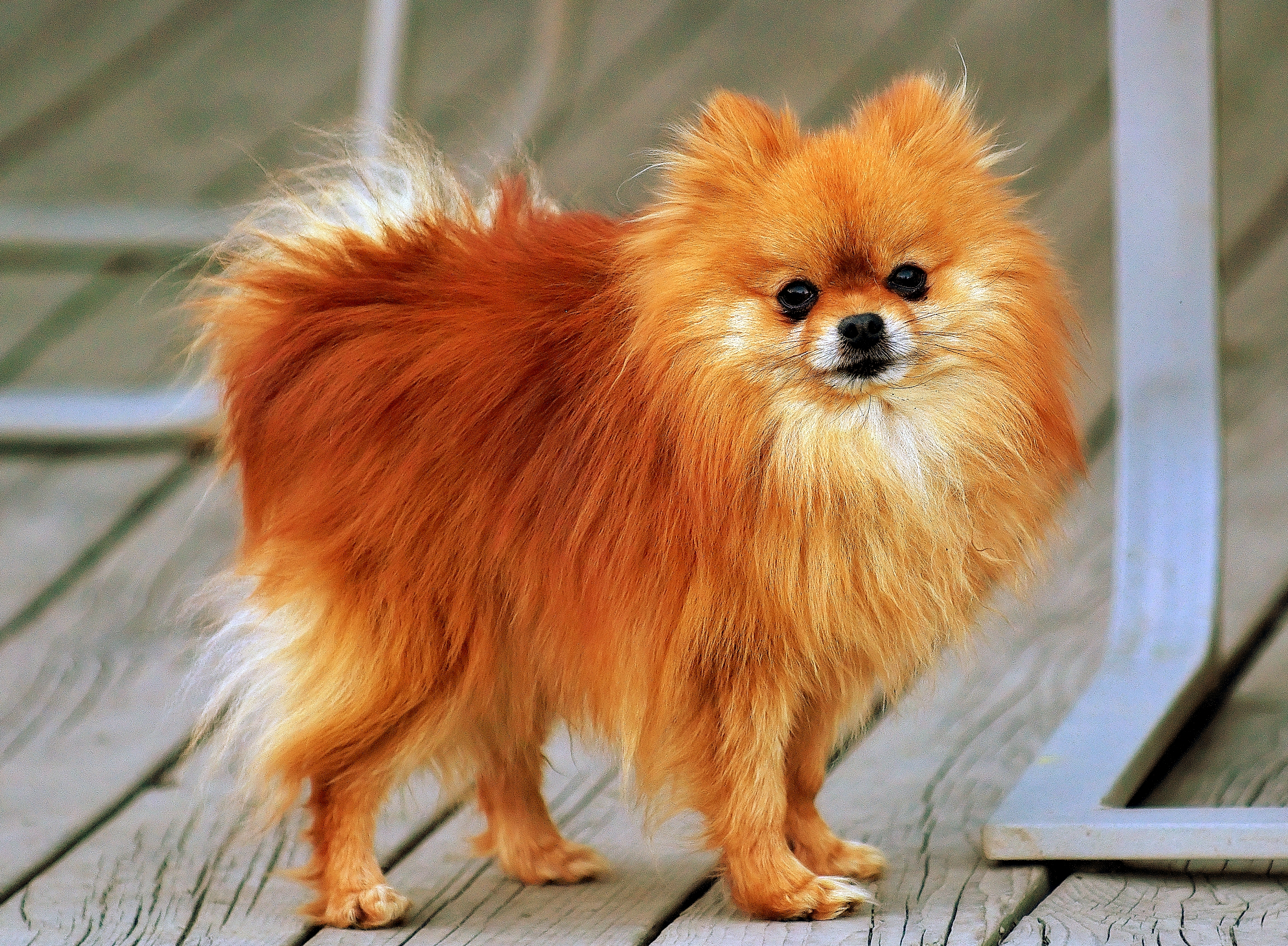
Red Sable Pomeranian

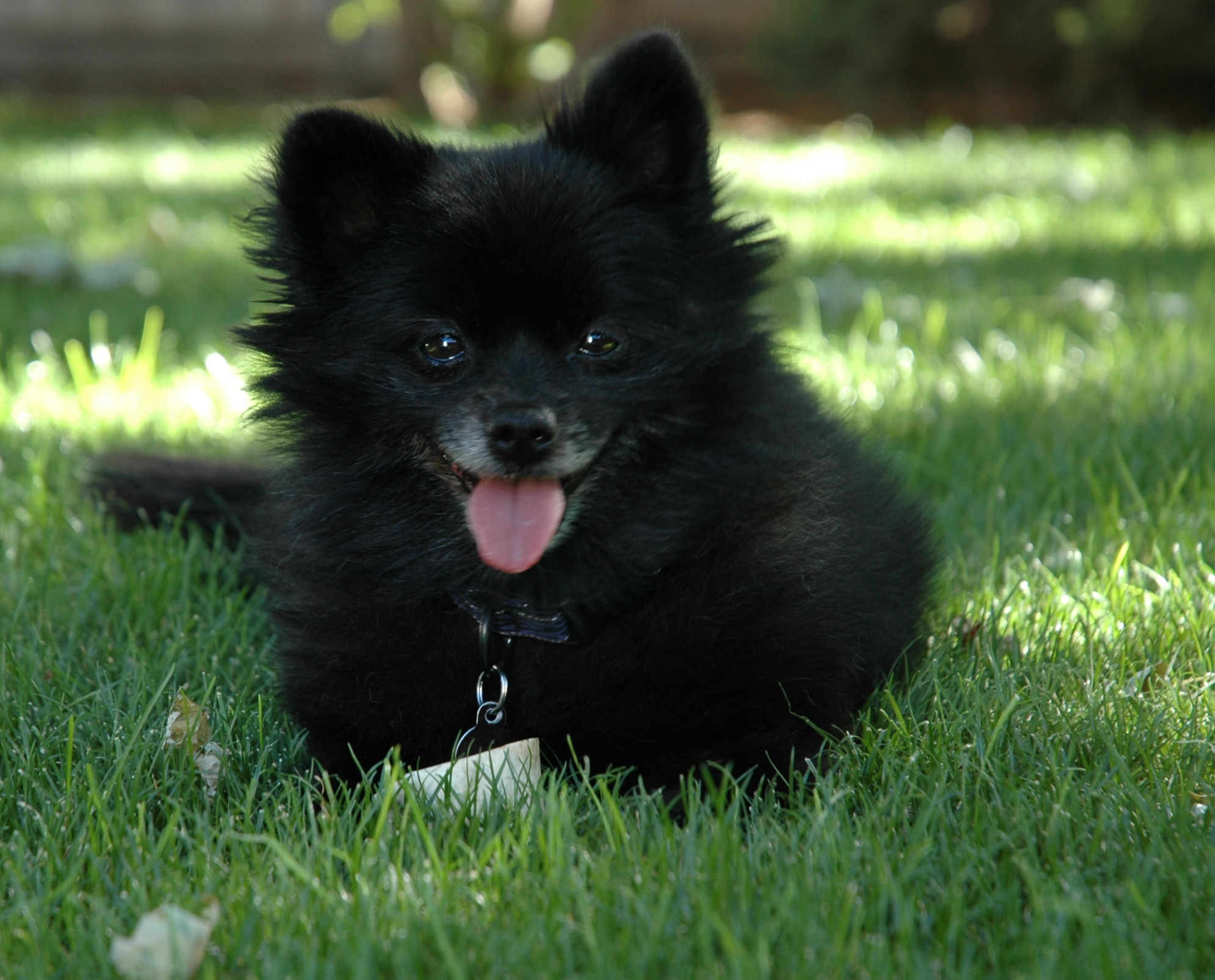
Black Pomeranian

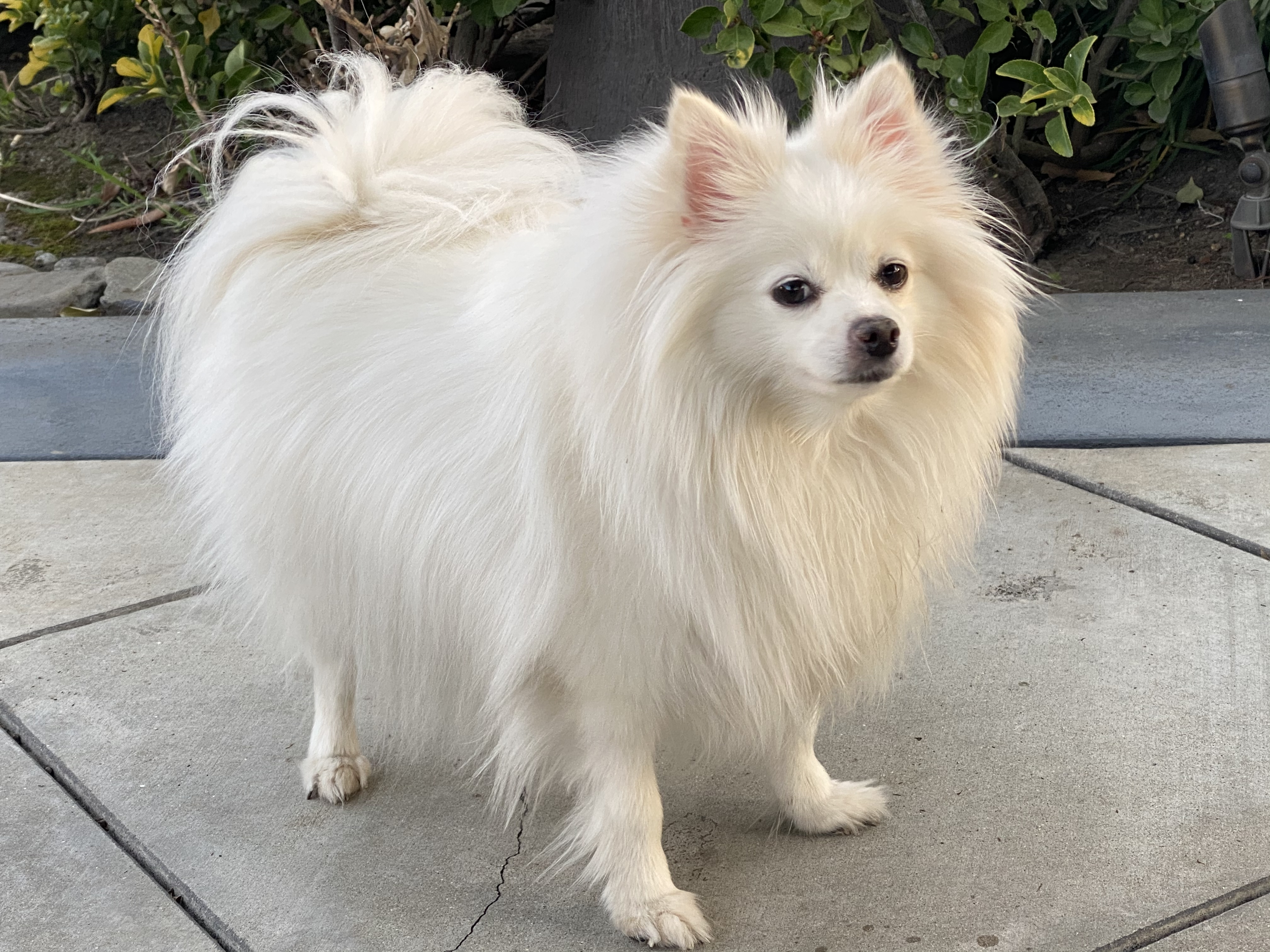
White Pomeranian

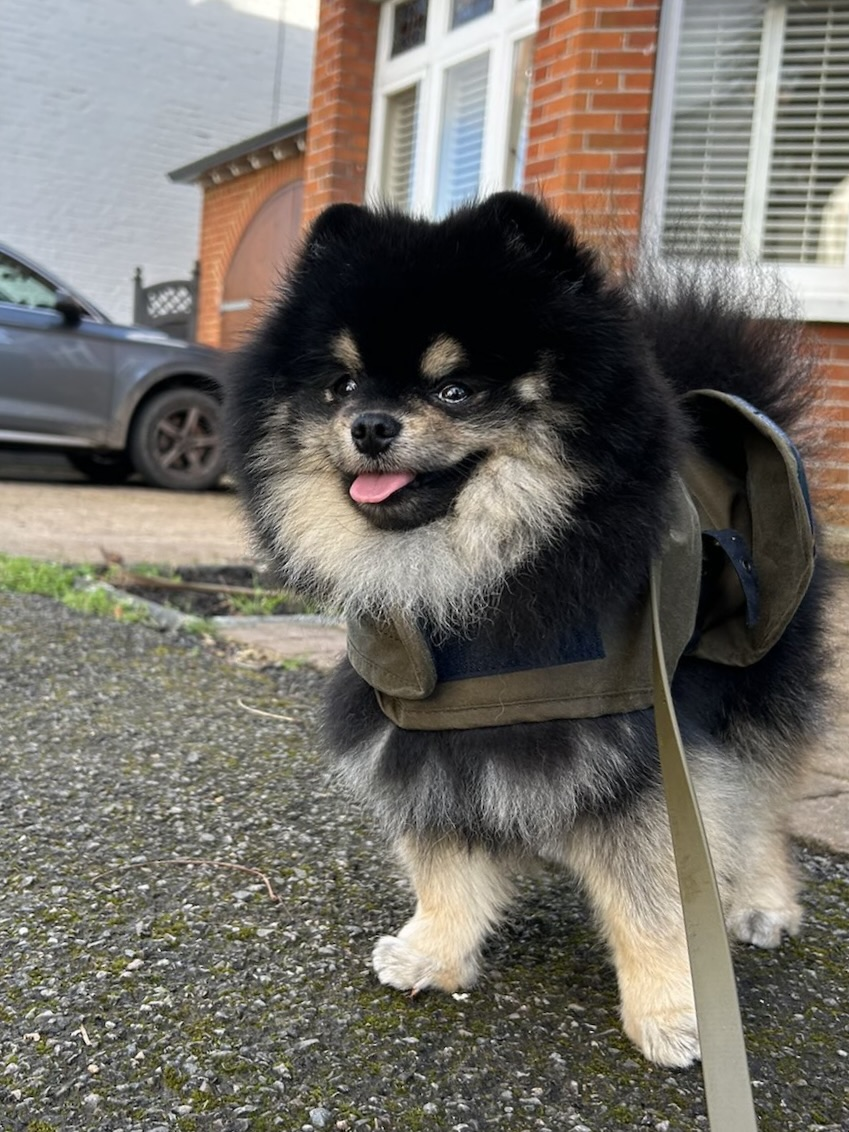
Black and tan Pomeranian

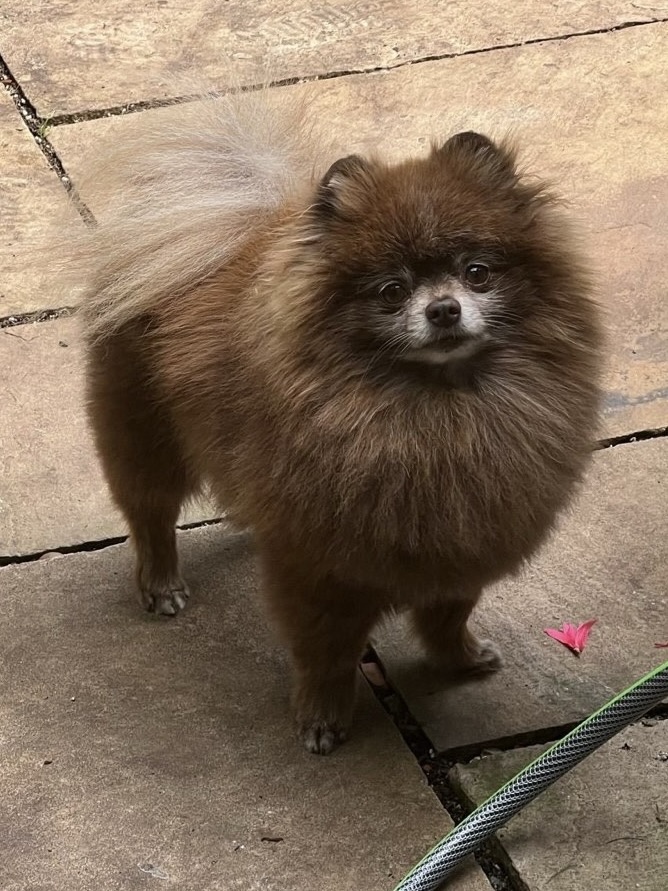
Chocolate Pomeranian

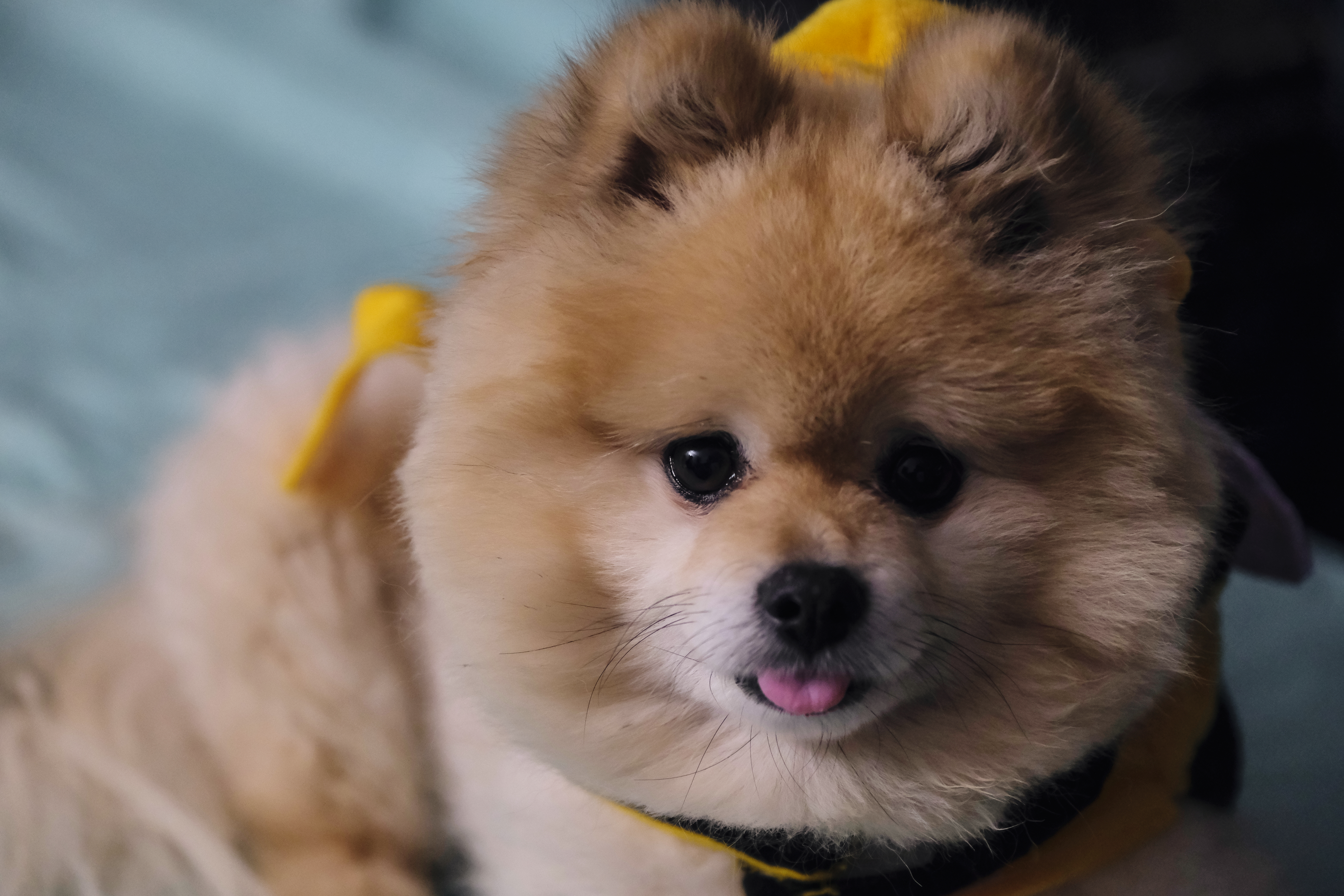
Tan Pomeranian

== Behaviour ==
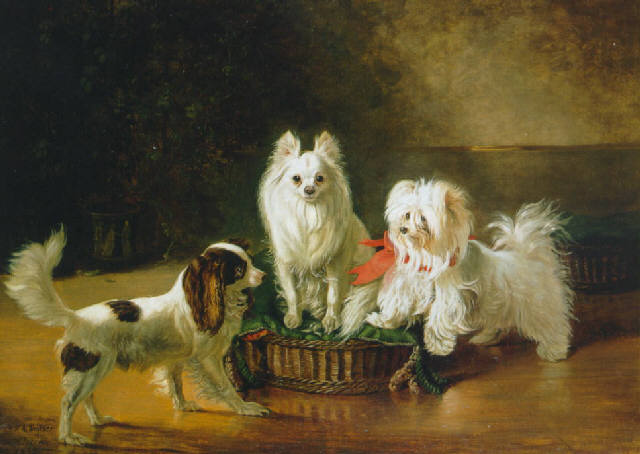
A Toy Spaniel, a Dwarf Spitz and a Maltese next to a basket (1855) by Johann Friedrich Wilhelm Wegener

Pomeranians are alert and aware of changes in their environment, and barking at new stimuli can develop into a habit of barking excessively in any situation. They are somewhat defensive of their territory and thus may bark when they hear outside noises.

== Health ==
A UK study found a life expectancy of 12.2 years for the Pomeranian. A Japanese study of pet cemetery data found a life expectancy of 14 years, below the average of 15.3 years for cross-breed dogs below 10 kg. Pomeranians are prone to a number of health conditions typical of small toy breeds. Common orthopedic issues include patellar luxation, in which the kneecap dislocates, sometimes requiring surgical correction in moderate to severe cases; and collapsed trachea, a condition that leads to a honking cough and may need veterinary management or surgery in severe cases.

Pomeranians are one of the breeds with the smallest average litter size, with various sources giving numbers of between 1.9 and 2.7 puppies per litter.

=== Dermatological conditions ===
The Pomeranian is significantly predisposed to alopecia X with Pomeranians comprising 79.3% of the case load of a referral clinic in Japan and 26.5% of an endocrine alopecia case load in the US.

=== Skeletal conditions ===
A study in England found the prevalence patellar luxation to be 6.5% in the Pomeranian, the highest prevalence out of all breeds in the study. A USA study found an odds ratio of 18.6 compared to crossbreeds. Another study in the US found the Pomeranian to make up 9.3% of the caseload. In Thailand prevalence was found as high as 75% in one study and a 28.9% caseload in another.

=== Gastrointestinal conditions ===
A study in the US found a prevalence of 0.29% for congenital portosystemic shunt, an odds ratio of 5.6 compared to mixed-breed dogs.

A Japanese study found the Pomeranian to be significantly predisposed to gallbladder mucocoele with an odds ratio of 7.74 compared to the overall referral population.

=== Neurological conditions ===
In case studies of atlantoaxial subluxation the Pomeranian was found to comprise 10.6% of cases in Japan, 46.7% in the UK, and 10.5% and 6.5% in the US.

=== Other conditions ===
Merle-colored dogs may have mild to severe deafness, blindness, increased intraocular pressure, ametropia, microphthalmia, and colobomas. Merle dogs born from parents who are also both merles may additionally have abnormalities of the skeletal, cardiac and reproductive systems.

In case studies of referral clinics for tracheal collapse the Pomeranian made up 6%, 13.5%, and 16.7% of three referral caseloads in the US and 11.9% of a referral caseload in South Korea. In an Australian study on a referral population the Pomeranian had a 9.3% prevalence.

Another common disorder in male Pomeranians is cryptorchidism. This is when either one or both of the testicles do not descend into the scrotum. It is treated through surgical removal of the retained testicle.

In China, 54.6% of Pomeranians attending veterinary clinics were obese.

== History ==
=== Origins ===
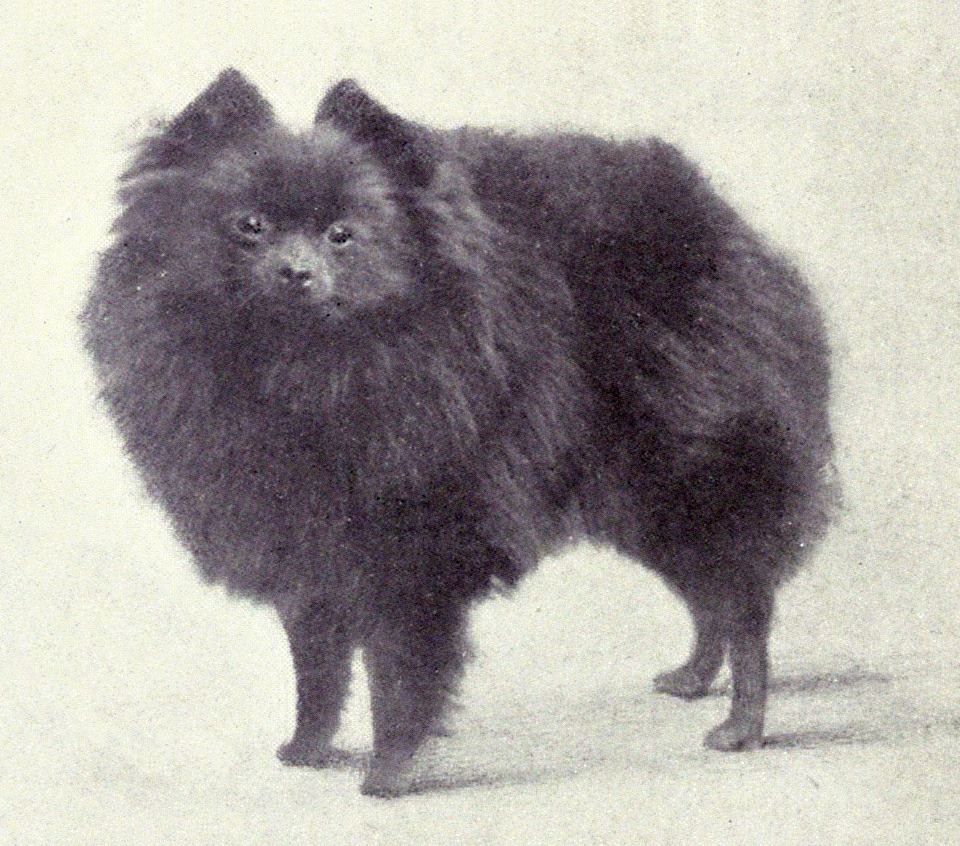
A miniature Pomeranian from 1915

The Pomeranian is considered to be descended from the German Spitz. The breed is thought to have acquired its name by association with the area known as Pomerania which is located in northern Poland and Germany along the Baltic Sea. Although not the origin of the breed, this area is credited with the breeding that led to the original Pomeranian type of dog. Proper documentation was lacking until the breed's introduction into the United Kingdom.

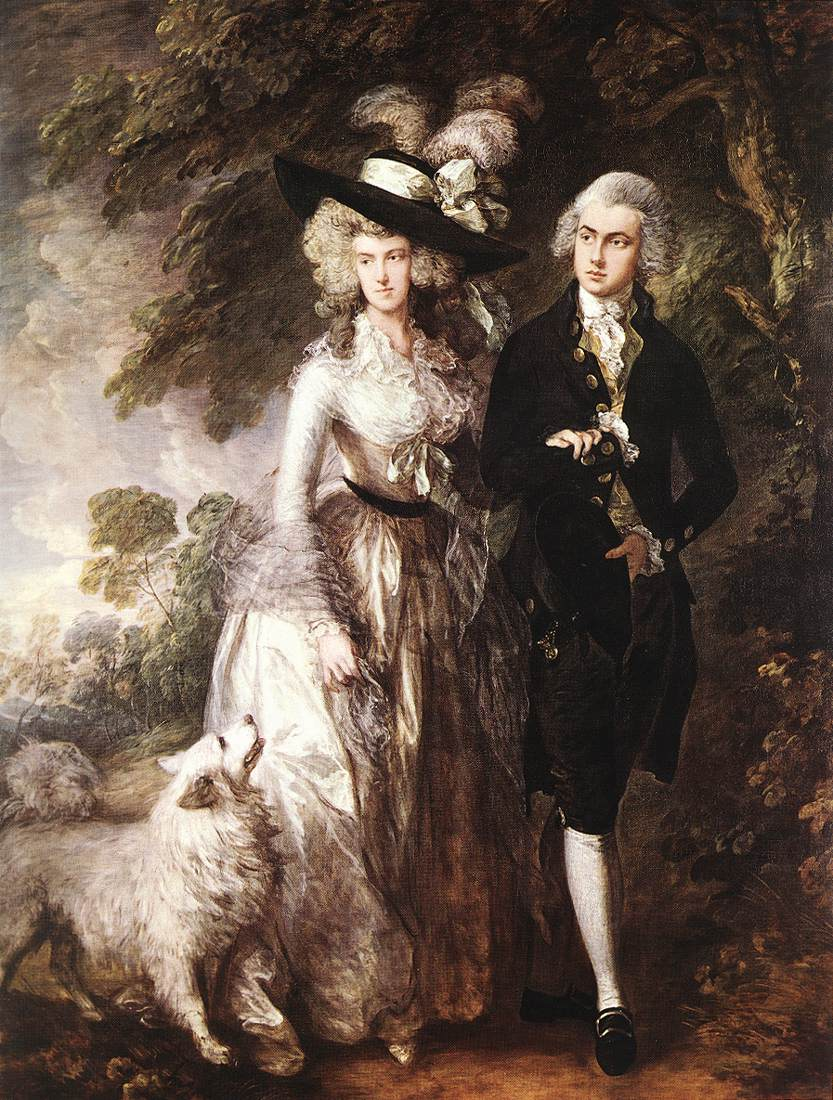
Portrait of Mr and Mrs William Hallett by Thomas Gainsborough, 1785. The painting features a larger type of Pomeranian than is now common.

An early modern recorded reference to the Pomeranian breed is from 2 November 1764, in a diary entry in James Boswell's Boswell on the Grand Tour: Germany and Switzerland. "The Frenchman had a Pomeranian dog named Pomer whom he was mighty fond of." The offspring of a Pomeranian and a wolf bred by an animal merchant from London is discussed in Thomas Pennant's A Tour in Scotland from 1769.

Two members of the British royal family influenced the evolution of the breed. In 1767, Queen Charlotte, Queen-consort of King George III of Great Britain, brought two Pomeranians to England.

Named Phoebe and Mercury, the dogs were depicted in paintings by Sir Thomas Gainsborough. These paintings depicted a dog larger than the modern breed, reportedly weighing as much as 30–50 lb (14–23 kg), but showing modern traits such as the heavy coat, ears and a tail curled over the back.

Queen Victoria, Queen Charlotte's granddaughter, was also an enthusiast and established a large breeding kennel. One of her favoured dogs was a comparatively small red sable Pomeranian which she possibly named "Windsor's Marco" and was reported to weigh only 12 lb (5.4 kg). When she first exhibited Marco in 1891, it caused the smaller-type Pomeranian to become immediately popular, and breeders began selecting only the smaller specimens for breeding. During her lifetime, the size of the Pomeranian breed was reported to have decreased by 50%. Queen Victoria worked to alter and promote the Pomeranian breed by importing smaller Pomeranians of different colours from various European countries to add to her breeding program. Royal owners during this period also included Joséphine de Beauharnais, the wife of Napoleon I of France, and King George IV of the United Kingdom.

The first breed club was set up in England in 1891, and the first breed standard was written shortly afterwards. The first member of the breed was registered in the United States to the American Kennel Club in 1898, and it was recognized in 1900.

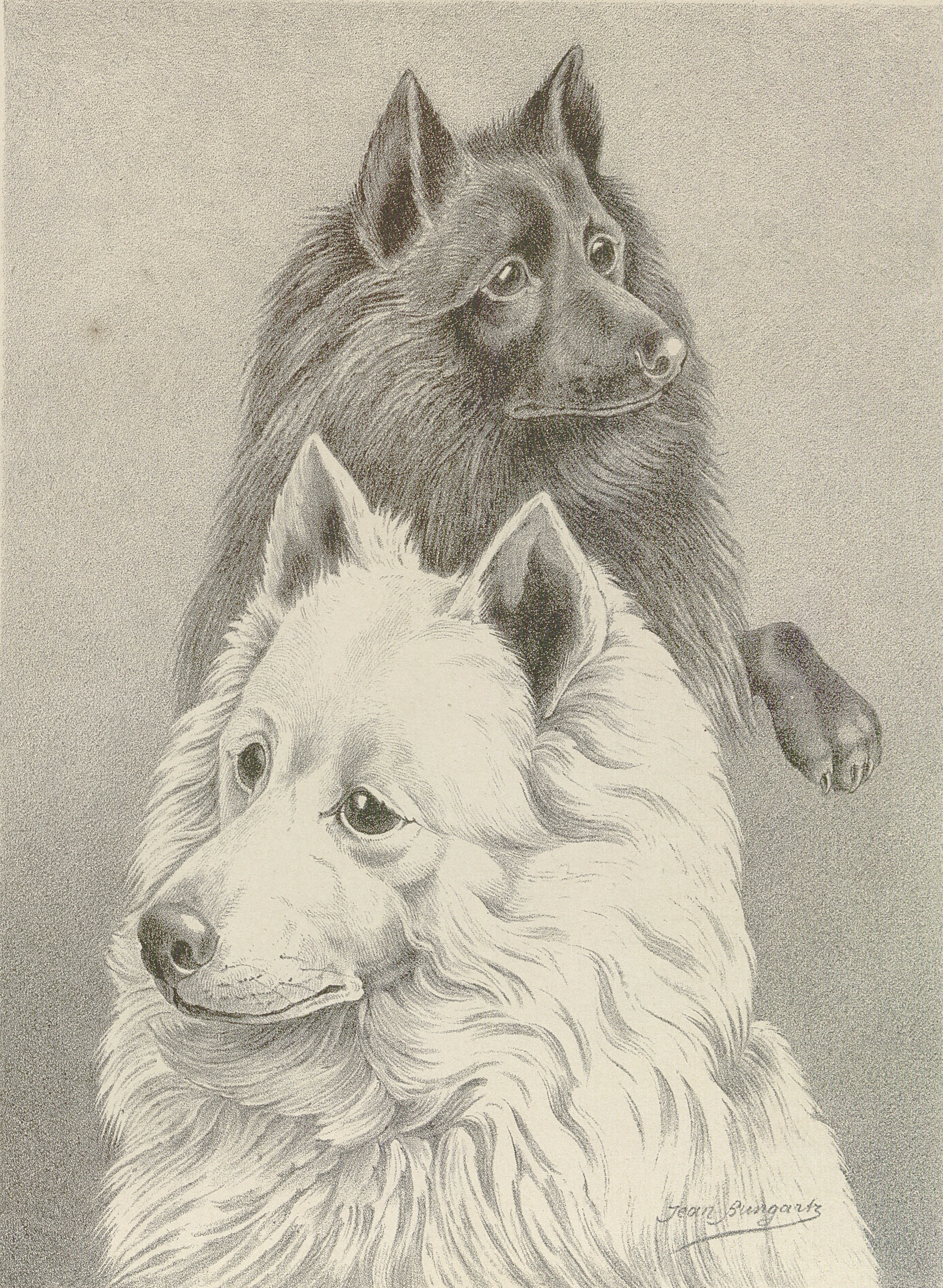
Pomeranian (top) on an 1890 illustration

In 1912, two Pomeranians were among only three dogs to survive the sinking of RMS Titanic. A Pomeranian called "Lady", owned by Margaret Bechstein Hays, escaped with her owner in lifeboat number seven, while Elizabeth Barrett Rothschild took her pet to safety with her in lifeboat number six.

Glen Rose Flashaway won the Toy Group at the Westminster Kennel Club Dog Show in 1926, the first Pomeranian to win a group at Westminster. It would take until 1988 for the first Pomeranian, "Great Elms Prince Charming II", to win the Best in Show prize from the Westminster Kennel Club.

In the standard published in 1998, the Pomeranian is included in the German Spitz standard, along with the Keeshond, by the Fédération Cynologique Internationale.

=== Popularity ===
The Pomeranian has been among the more popular dog breeds in the United States, featuring consistently in the top 20 of registered American Kennel Club dog breeds since at least 1998, when it was ranked #10; the breed was #17 in the 2011 rankings, dropping two spots from the previous year. In 2012 and 2013 it remained in the top twenty and was ranked at #19. In 2015, the breed fell to #21, falling further to #22 in 2016 and holding that rank through to 2024.

It is not listed in the top 20 breeds in the UK in either 2007 or 2008. In Australia their popularity has declined since 1986, with a peak of 1,128 Pomeranians registered with the Australian National Kennel Council in 1987; only 285 were registered in 2023.

== See also ==
- Companion dog
- Boo (dog)
- Lap dog
- Spitz
- Therapy dog
