= Keeshond =

Dog breed

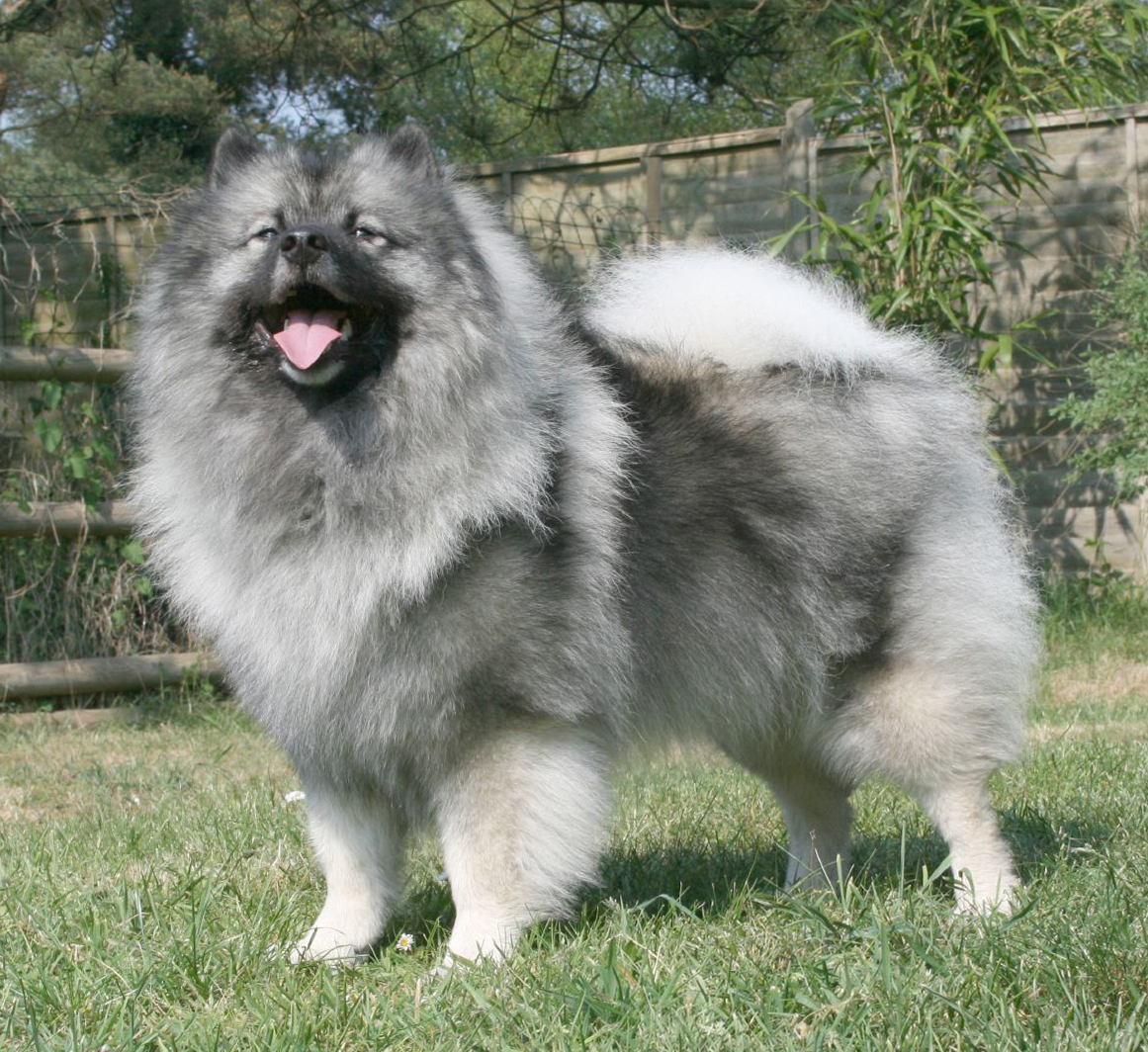
- Distinct characteristics of Keeshonden include a lion-like ruff, spectacles, small and dark triangular ears, definite contrast, and a thick double coat.
- Other names: Dutch Barge Dog, Smiling Dutchman, German Spitz, Deutscher Wolfspitz, Wolfspitz, Dire Pomeranian
- Common nicknames: Kees
- Origin: Netherlands
Traits
Height	Males	44 to 48 cm (17 to 19 in)
	Females	40 to 46 cm (16 to 18 in)
- Weight: 15 to 20 kg (33 to 44 lb)
- Coat: Double
- Color: Mix of Silver, Light Gray, Dark Gray, and White. They are cream at the Forehead and Legs.
Kennel club standards
- Fédération Cynologique Internationale: standard

The Keeshond (/ˈkeɪshɒnd/ KAYSS-hond, plur. Keeshonden) is a medium-sized dog with a plush, two-layer coat of silver and black fur with a ruff and a curled tail. Their closest relatives are the German spitzes such as the Großspitz (Large Spitz), Mittelspitz (Medium Spitz), Kleinspitz (Miniature Spitz), Zwergspitz (Dwarf-Spitz) or Pomeranian.

The Keeshond was previously known as the Dutch Barge Dog, as it was frequently seen on barges traveling the canals and rivers of the Netherlands. The Keeshond was the symbol of the Patriot faction in the Netherlands during political unrest in the years immediately preceding the French Revolution.

In the late 19th century, the breed was developed in England from imports obtained in both the Netherlands and Germany. In 1930, the Keeshond was first registered with the American Kennel Club.

== Description ==
=== Appearance ===
A member of the spitz group of dogs, the Keeshond in American Kennel Club (AKC) standard is 17 inches (43 cm) to 18 inches (46 cm) tall and 19.25 inches (48.9 cm) ± 2.4 inches (6.1 cm) in the Fédération Cynologique Internationale (FCI) standard and weighs 30 pounds (14 kg) to 40 pounds (18 kg). Sturdily built, they have a typical spitz appearance. Neither coarse nor refined, they have a wedge-shaped head, medium-length muzzle with a definite stop, small pointed ears, and an expressive face. The tail is tightly curled and, in profile, should be carried such that it is indistinguishable from the compact body of the dog.

==== Coat ====
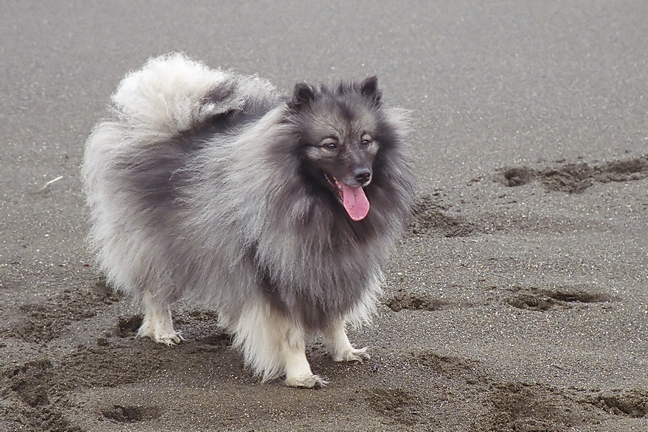
Keeshond

Like most spitz-type dogs, the Keeshond has a dense double coat, with a thick ruff around the neck. Typically, the males of this breed will have a thicker, more pronounced ruff than the females. The body should be abundantly covered with long, straight, harsh hair standing well out from a thick, downy undercoat. The hair on the legs should be smooth and short, except for a feathering on the front legs and "trousers" on the hind legs. The hair on the tail should be profuse, forming a rich plume. The head, including muzzle, skull, and ears, should be covered with smooth, soft, short hair—velvety in texture on the ears. The coat must not part down the back.

Coat care requires line brushing on a fairly regular basis. The Keeshond typically 'blows' its undercoat once a year for males, twice a year for females. During this time, the loss of coat is excessive and their guard hairs will lie flat to their back. It usually takes two weeks for the 'blow' to complete, in order for new undercoat to begin growing back in. A Keeshond should never be shaved, as their undercoat provides a natural barrier against heat and cold. Keeping their coat in good condition will allow efficient insulation in both hot and cold weather.

==== Color ====
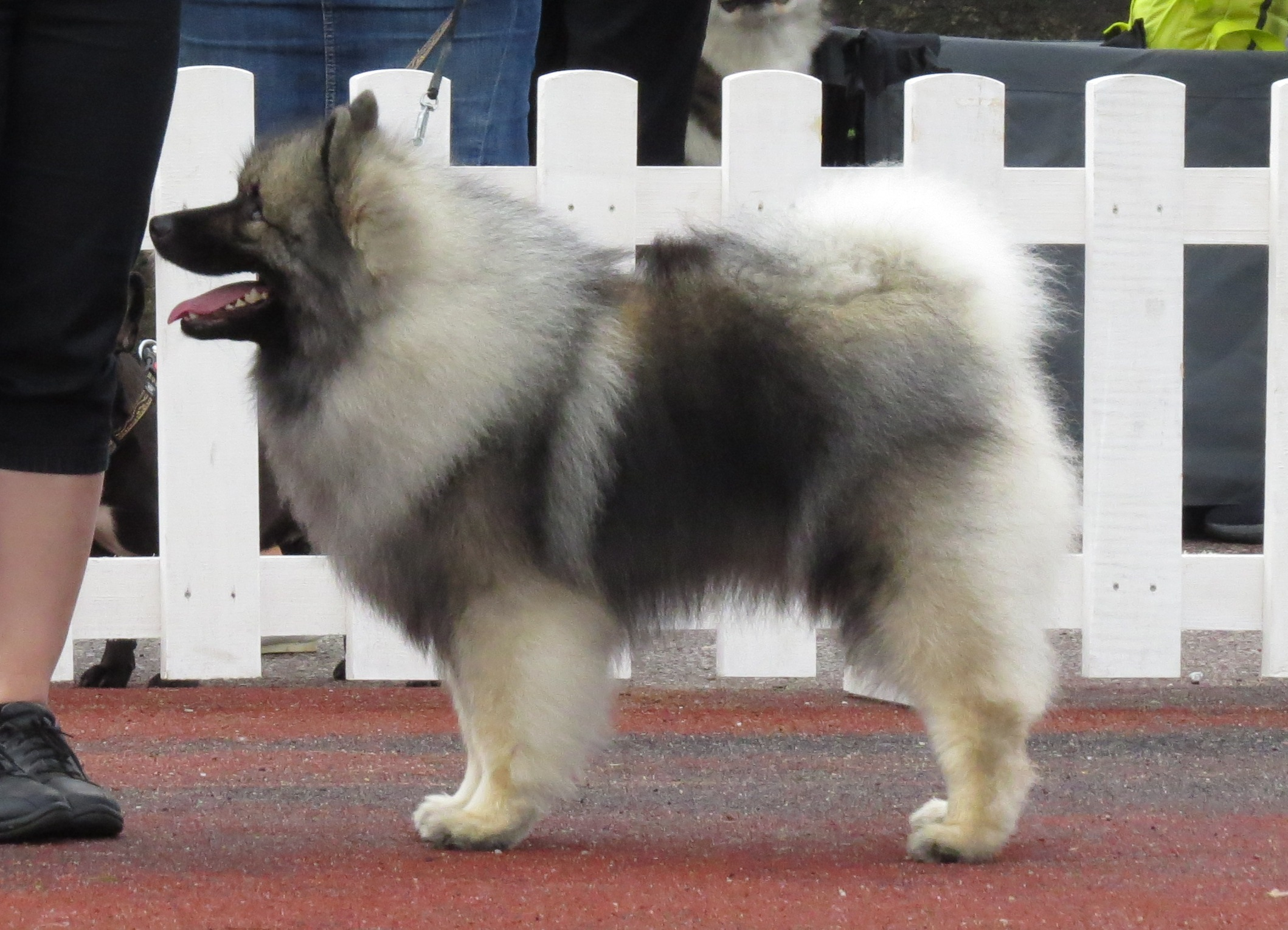
Keeshond at a dog show

The color should be a mixture of grey and black and some white as well. The undercoat should be very pale grey or cream (not tawny). The hair of the outer coat is black tipped, the length of the black tips producing the characteristic shading of color. The color may vary from light to dark, but any pronounced deviation from the grey color is not permissible. The plume of the tail should be very light grey when curled on back and the tip of the tail should be black. Legs and feet should be cream. Ears should be very dark—almost black.

Shoulder line markings (light grey) should be well defined. The color of the ruff and "trousers" is generally lighter than that of the body. "Spectacles" and shadings, as later described, are characteristic of the breed and must be present to some degree. There should be no pronounced white markings.

According to the American Kennel Club breed standard, the legs and feet are to be cream; feet that are totally black or white are severe faults. Black markings more than halfway down the foreleg, except for pencilling, are faulted.

The other important marking is the "spectacles", a delicate dark line running from the outer corner of each eye toward the lower corner of each ear, which, coupled with markings forming short eyebrows, is necessary for the distinct expressive look of the breed. All markings should be clear, not muddled or broken. Absence of the spectacles is considered a serious fault. The eyes should be dark brown, almond-shaped with black eye rims.

Ears should be small, dark, triangular, and erect.

=== Temperament ===
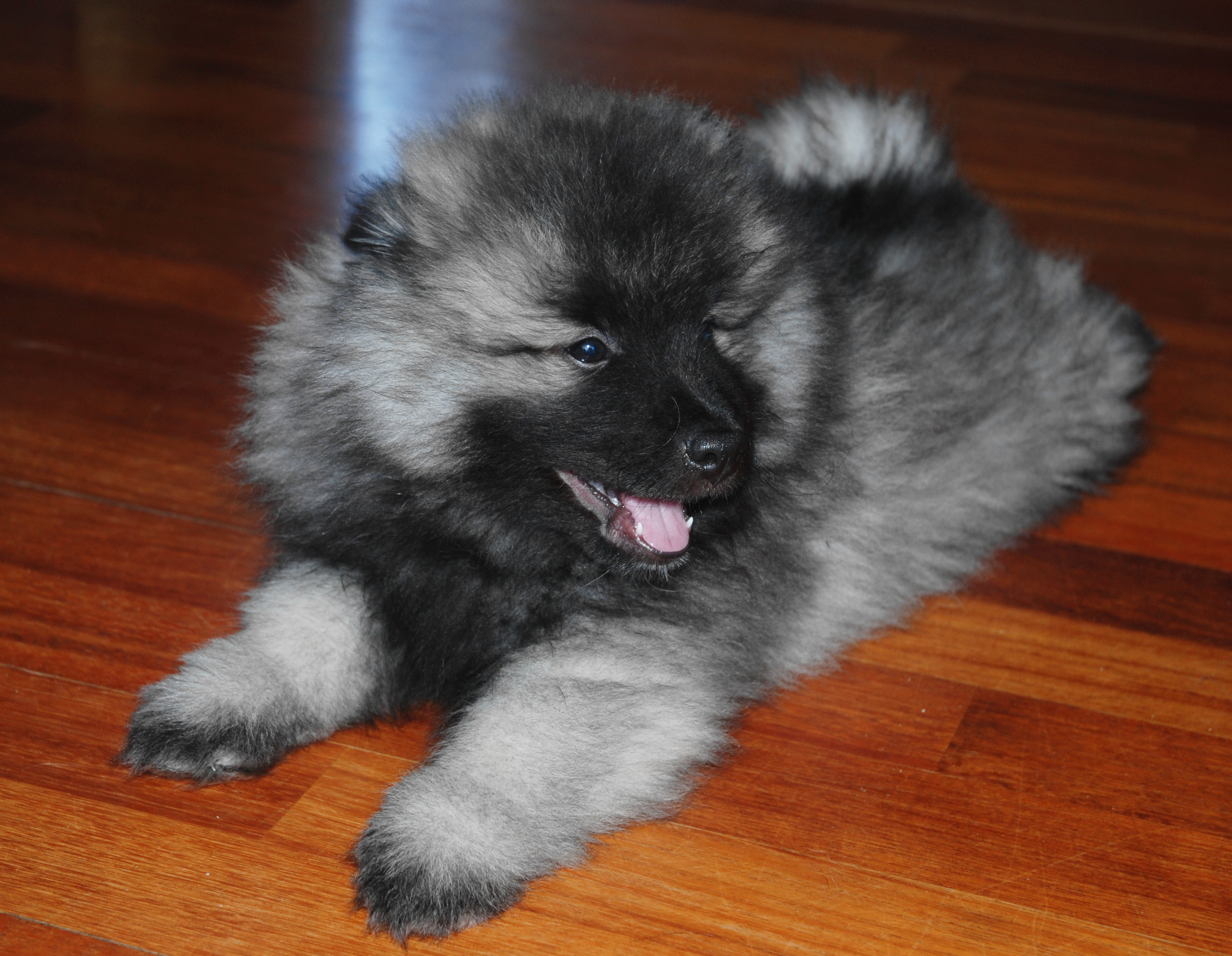
7-week-old Keeshond puppy

Keeshonden are often utilized as agility and obedience dogs. They have been successfully trained to serve as guide dogs for the blind; only their lack of size has prevented them from being more widely used in this role.

They love children and are excellent family dogs, preferring to be close to their humans whenever possible. They generally get along with other dogs as well and will enjoy a good chase around the yard. Keeshonden are very intuitive and empathetic and are often used as comfort dogs. Most notably, at least one Keeshond, Tikva, was at Ground Zero following the September 11 attacks to help comfort the rescue workers. The breed has a tendency to become especially clingy towards their owners, more so than most other breeds. If their owner is out, or in another room behind a closed door, they may sit, waiting for their owner to reappear, even if there are other people nearby. Many have been referred to as their "owner's shadow", or "velcro dogs".

They are known by their loud, distinctive bark. Throughout the centuries, the Keeshond has been very popular as a watch dog on barges on canals in the Netherlands and middle Europe. This trait is evident to this day, and they are alert dogs that warn their owners of any new visitors. Although loud and alert, Keeshonden are not aggressive towards visitors. They generally welcome visitors affectionately once their family has accepted them. Unfortunately, barking may become a problem if not properly handled. Keeshonden that are kept in a yard, and not allowed to be with their humans, are unhappy and often become nuisance barkers.

According to Stanley Coren's The Intelligence of Dogs, being of excellent working/obedience intelligence, the Keeshond has been ranked 18th. Coren considers the Keeshond a good choice for the dog owner who is willing to help a dog learn the right lessons, but also entails added responsibility.

== Health ==
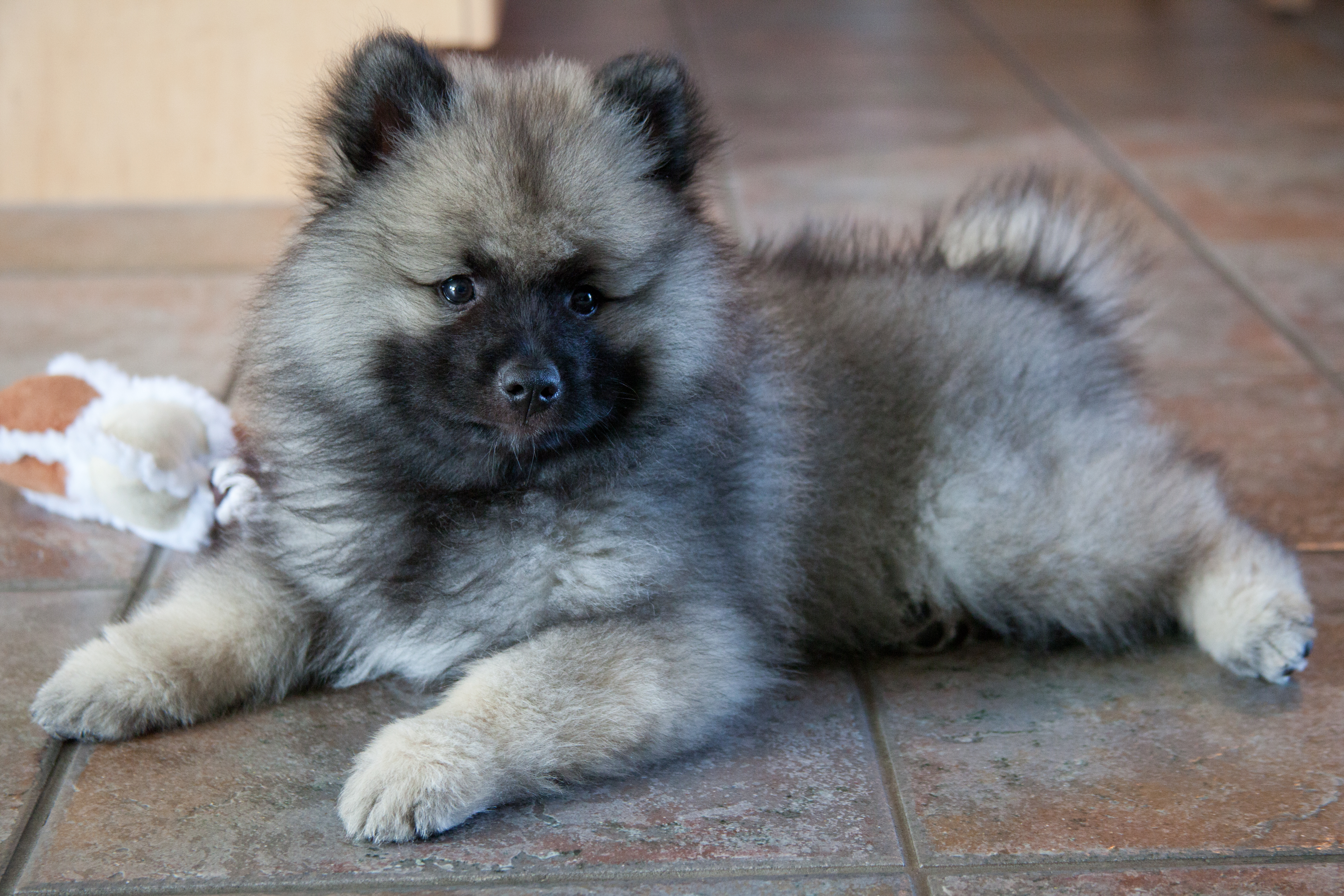
A Keeshond puppy

Keeshonden are generally a very healthy breed. Though congenital health issues are not common, the conditions which have been known to sometimes occur in Keeshonden are hip dysplasia, luxating patellas (trick knee), epilepsy, Cushing's disease, diabetes, primary hyperparathyroidism, and hypothyroidism. Von Willebrand's disease has been known in Keeshonden but is very rare. An accurate test for the gene causing primary hyperparathyroidism (or PHPT) has recently been developed at Cornell University. As with any breed, it is important when buying a puppy to make sure that both parents have been tested and certified free from inherited problems. Test results may be obtained from the breeder, and directly from the Orthopaedic Foundation For Animals site.

A 2024 UK study found a life expectancy 12.3 years based on a sample of 55 deaths for the breed compared to an average of 12.7 for purebreeds and 12 for crossbreeds.

== History ==
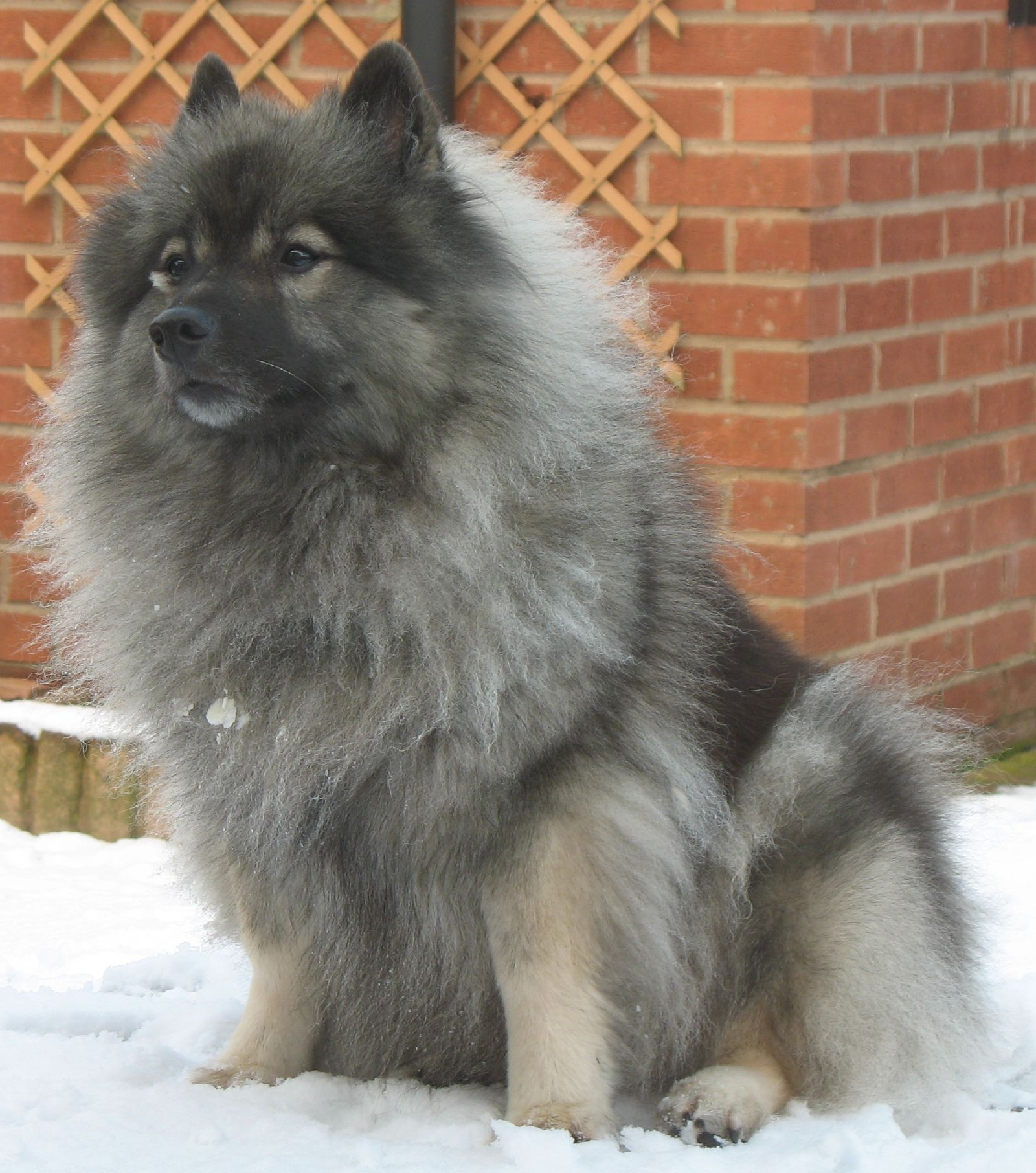
Keeshond

The Keeshond was named after the 18th-century Dutch Patriot, Cornelis (Kees) de Gyselaer (spelled 'Gijzelaar' in Modern Dutch), leader of the rebellion against the House of Orange. The dog became the rebels' symbol; and, when the House of Orange returned to power, this breed almost disappeared. The word 'keeshond' is a compound word: 'Kees' is a nickname for Cornelius (de Gyselaer), and 'hond' is the Dutch word for dog. In the Netherlands, "keeshond" is the term for German Spitzes that encompass them all from the toy or dwarf (Pomeranian) to the Wolfspitz (Keeshond). The sole difference among the German Spitzes is their coloring and size guidelines. There are debates over the origin of the breed; many English references point to the Keeshond as we know it originating in the Netherlands. On the other hand, according to the FCI, the breed is cited as being part of the German Spitz family, originating in Germany along with the Pomeranian (toy or dwarf German Spitz) and American Eskimo dog (small or standard German Spitz).

The first standard for "Wolfspitz" was posted at the Dog Show of 1880 in Berlin. The Club for German Spitzes was founded in 1899. The German standard was revised in 1901 to specify the characteristic color that we know today, "silver grey tipped with black". In the late 19th century the "Overweight Pomeranian", a white German Spitz and most likely a Standard German Spitz, was shown in the British Kennel Club. The "Overweight Pomeranian" was no longer recognized by the British Kennel Club in 1915. In the 1920s, Baroness van Hardenbroeck took an interest in the breed and began to build it up again. The Nederlandse Keeshond Club was formed in 1924. The Dutch Barge Dog Club of England was formed in 1925 by Mrs. Wingfield-Digby and accepted into the British Kennel Club in 1926, when the breed and the club were renamed to Keeshond.

Carl Hinderer is credited with bringing his Schloss Adelsburg Kennel, which he founded in 1922 in Germany, with him to America in 1923. His German Champion Wolfspitz followed him two by two in 1926. At that time, less than ten years after World War I, Germany was not regarded fondly in England and America; and the Wolfspitz/Keeshond was not recognized by the AKC. Consequently, Hinderer had to register each puppy born in the U.S. with his club in Germany. Despite this, he joined the Maryland KC and attended local shows.

Hinderer regularly wrote to the AKC, including the New York headquarters, to promote the Wolfspitz. While going through New York on his way to Germany in 1930, Hinderer visited the AKC offices and presented "Wachter", his Germany champion, to AKC President, Dr. DeMond, who promptly agreed to start the recognition process, with some caveats including changing the name to Keeshond, and asked Hinderer to bring back all the relevant data from Germany. Hinderer also translated the German standard to English for the AKC. The Keeshond was accepted for AKC registration in 1930.

Despite intense lobbying, the FCI refused to recognize the Keeshond as a separate breed, viewing the Wolfspitz and Keeshond as identical. In 1997, the German Spitz Club updated its standard to include the smaller Keeshond varieties typically found in English-speaking countries. This adjustment expanded the gene pool and achieved international standard unification.

Due to their facial expression and temperament, Keeshonds are sometimes referred to as 'the Smiling Dutchman.'

== See also ==
- List of dog breeds
