= List of Old Ardinians =

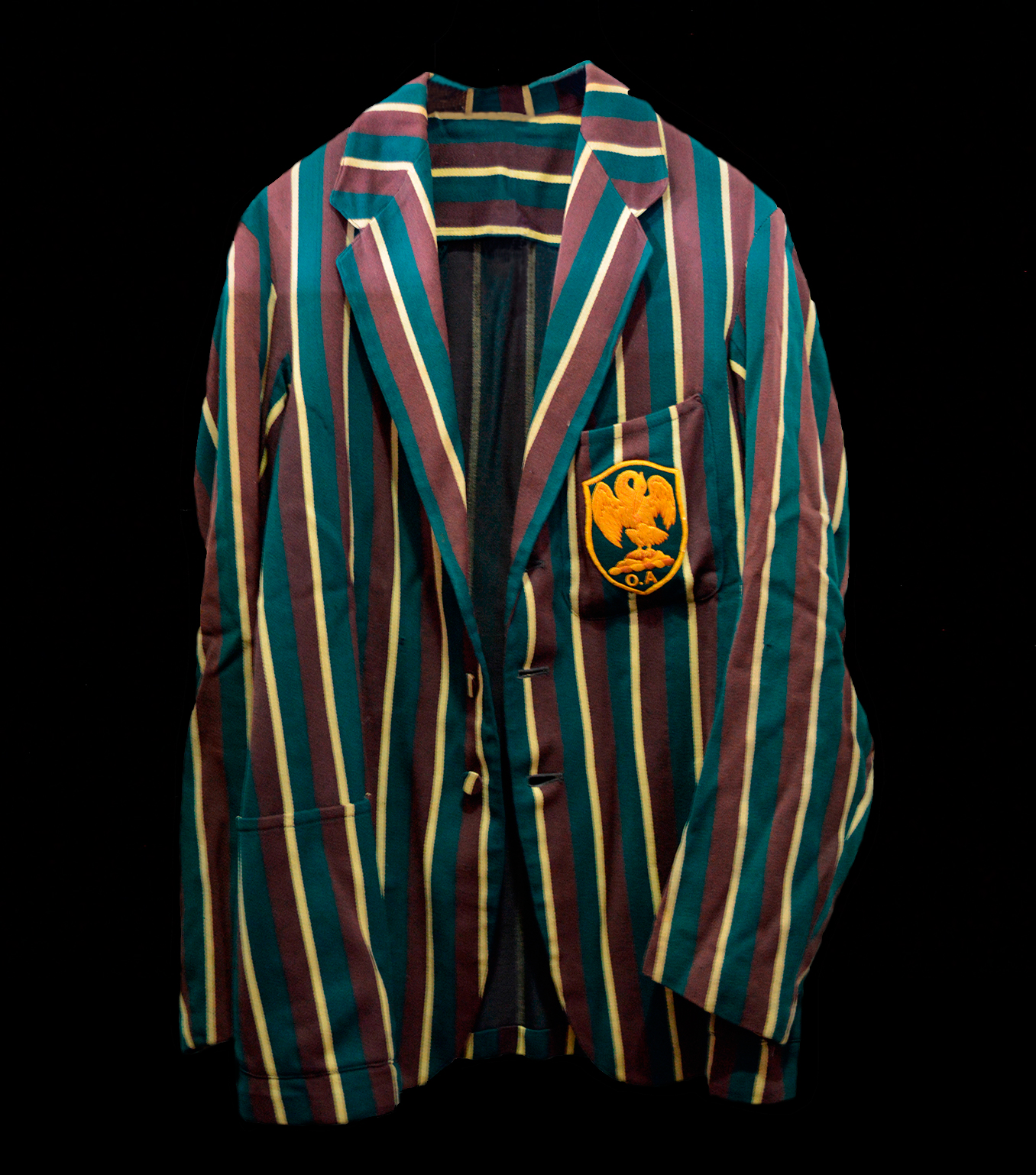
Typical Old Ardinian blazer in school colours. These garments may be worn by men who attended the school

The following is a list of some notable Old Ardinians, being former pupils of Ardingly College in the United Kingdom.

== Politics ==
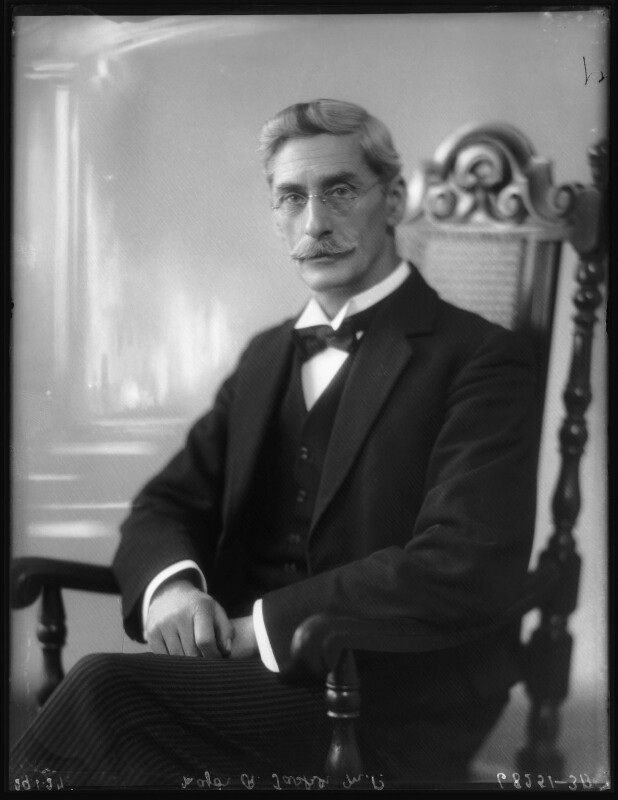
Conservative MP Sir Robert Tasker

- Sir Andrew Bowden - Member of Parliament (Conservative)
- Sir Robert Cary, 1st Baronet - Member of Parliament (Conservative)
- Jack Easter - Member of the Legislative Assembly in New South Wales
- Sir John Gorst - Member of Parliament (Conservative)
- Sir James Simpson - Cabinet Minister in Uganda
- Sir Robert Tasker - Member of Parliament (Conservative)

== Diplomacy ==
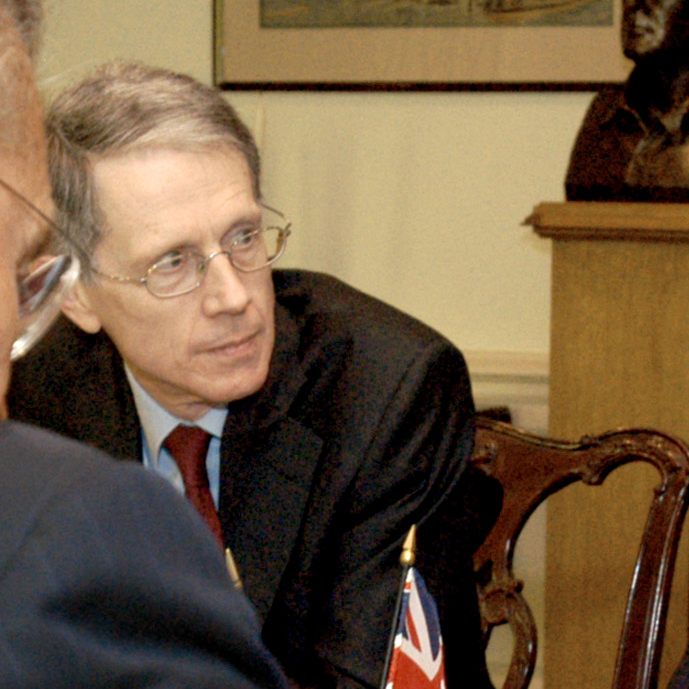
Former UK Ambassador the United States Sir David Manning

- Robert Alston - UK High Commissioner to New Zealand and Ambassador to Oman
- Chris Gunness - UNRWA chief spokesperson
- Sir Claude Hayes - civil servant for overseas territories
- Sir Edward Jackson - UK Ambassador to Belgium and Cuba
- Ian Mackley - UK High Commissioner to Ghana and chargé d'Affaires to Afghanistan
- Sir David Manning - UK Ambassador the United States and Israel
- Sir Robin McLaren - UK Ambassador to China and the Philippines
- Sir Andrew Wood - UK Ambassador to Russia and Yugoslavia

== Sciences ==
- John Ackroyd - engineer
- Harold Comber - botanist
- Mike Pitts - archaeologist
- Paul Wild - radio astronomer

== Academia ==
- Mark Bevir - Professor of Political Science at the University of California, Berkeley and the United Nations University
- Frank Cowell - Professor of Economics at the London School of Economics
- Robert Foley - Leverhulme Professor of Human Evolution at the University of Cambridge
- Sue Hamilton - Professor of Prehistory at (and former director of) the UCL Institute of Archaeology
- Patrick Hanks - lexicographer

== Arts ==
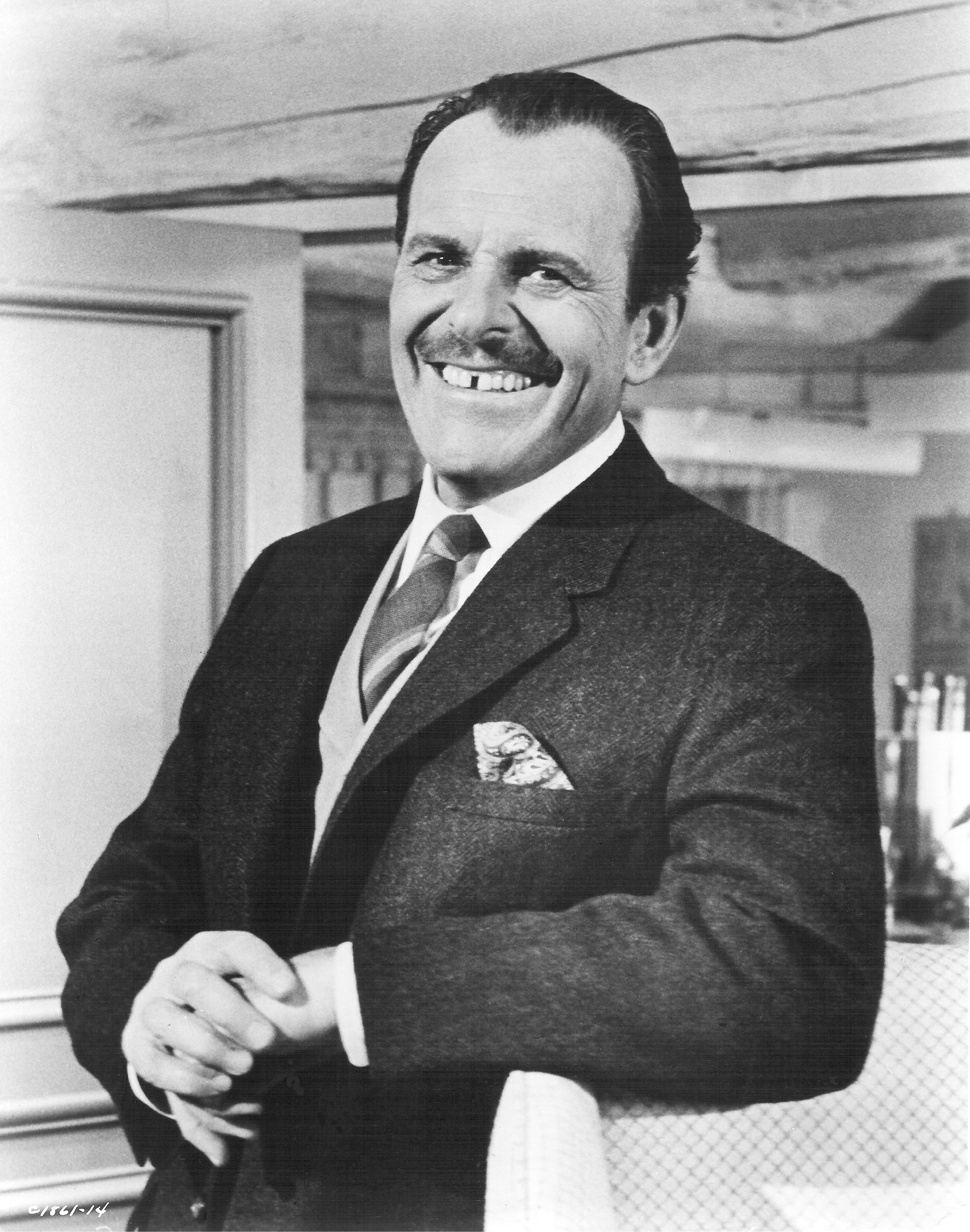
Actor Terry-Thomas

Stage and screen

- Dick Allen - film editor
- Charles Bryant - actor and film director
- Josh Dylan - actor
- Creighton Hale - actor
- Alan Howard - actor
- Mark Letheren - actor
- Jojo Macari - actor
- Ed Sanders - actor
- Terry-Thomas - actor
- Frank Williams - actor

Writers

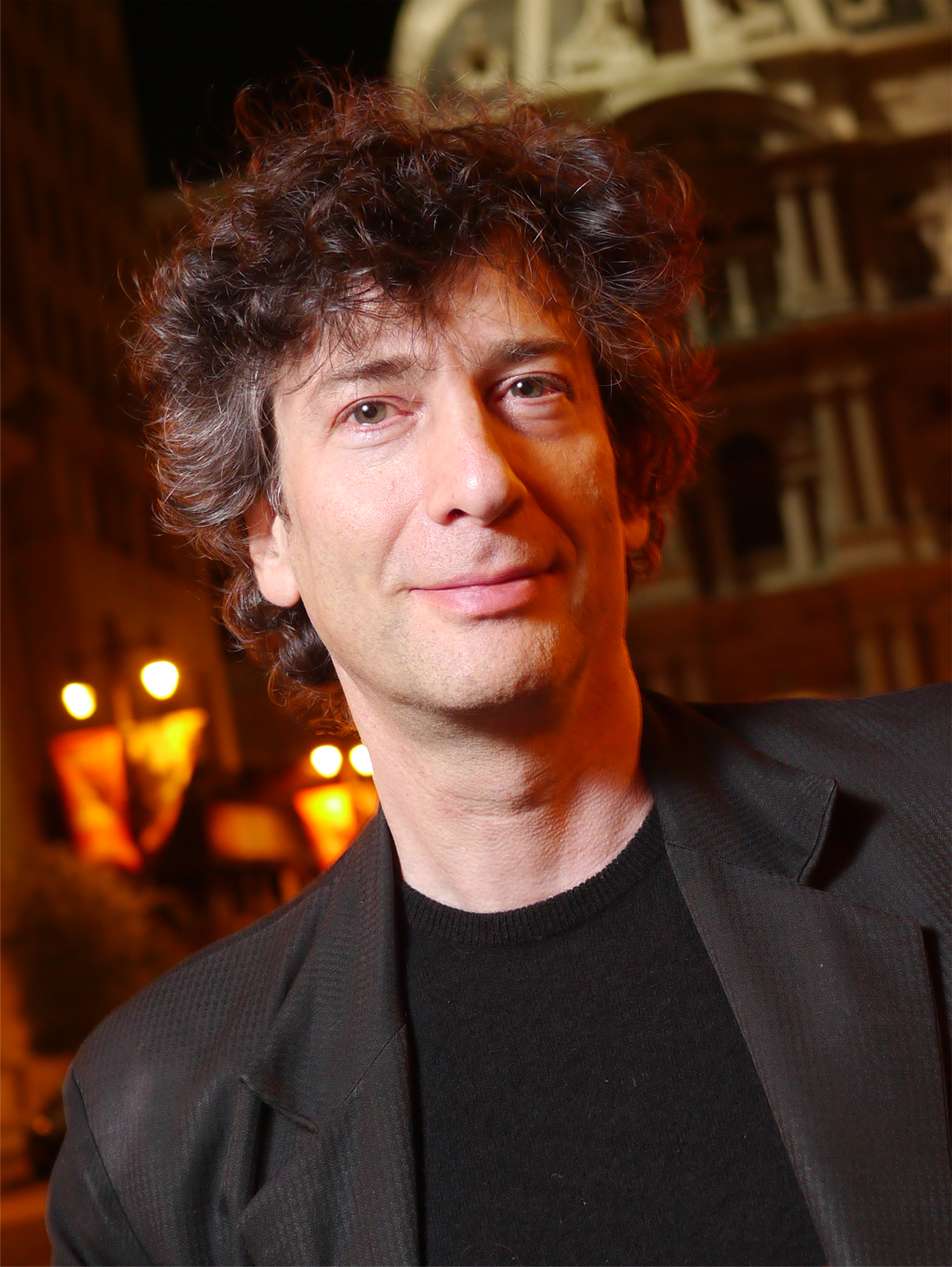
Author and screenwriter Neil Gaiman

- Elys Dolan - children's author and illustrator
- Nicholas Fisk - children's author
- Neil Gaiman - author and screenwriter
- Thomas Meech - author and journalist
- Mark Vernon - writer and psychotherapist
- Ed Whitmore - screenwriter

Music

- Alex Cartañá - singer
- Mike Christie - singer
- Julian Clifford - conductor
- James Lancelot - organist
- Stephen Oliver - composer
- Victor Silvester - composer and band leader
- Ed Welch - composer

Visual arts

- George Belcher - artist
- Robert Freeman - photographer
- John Hayes - director of the National Portrait Gallery (1974–1994)
- Alistair Morrison - photographer
- Ploenchan Vinyaratn - textile artist

== Media ==
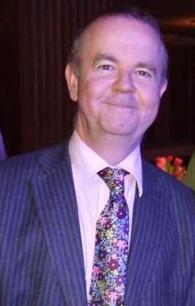
Satirist Ian Hislop

- Sir Bill Cotton - controller of BBC One (1977–1981)
- Colin Griffiths - broadcaster
- Ian Hislop - editor of Private Eye and panelist on Have I Got News For You
- Nick Newman - cartoonist and scriptwriter
- Ed Petrie - children's television presenter
- Paul Reynolds - BBC News correspondent
- Jay Wynne - BBC weather forecaster

== Sport ==
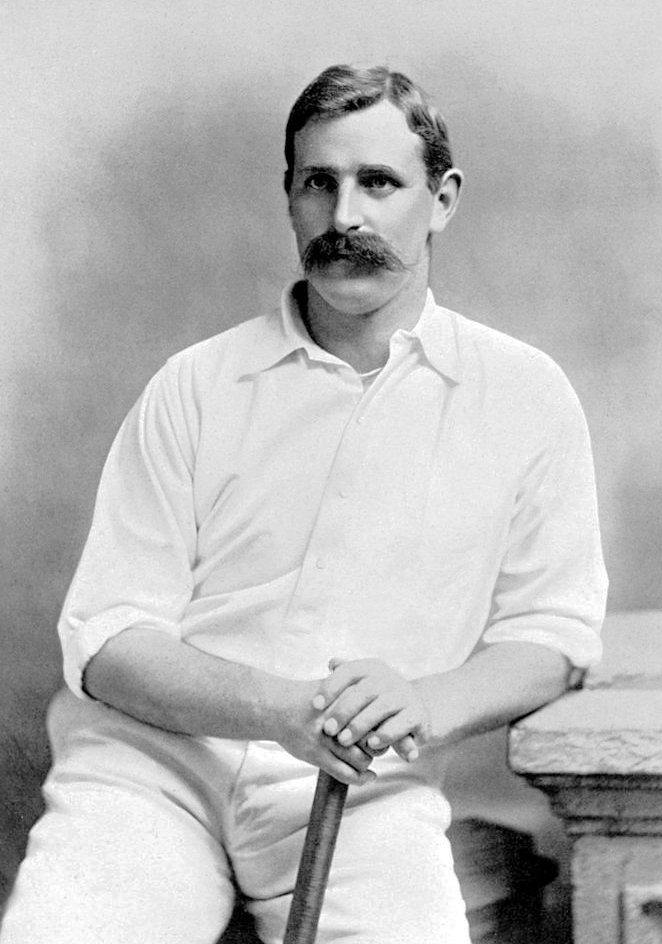
England footballer and Sussex cricketer George Brann

Motor sports

- Max Chilton - Formula One, WEC, and IndyCar racing driver
- Clifford Earp - racing driver
- Mike Hawthorn - Formula One racing driver and World Champion (1958)

Football

- George Brann - England footballer and Sussex cricketer
- Donald Coles - footballer
- Shim Mheuka - footballer
- Adam Virgo - footballer

Cricket

- Walter Bettesworth - Scotland and Sussex cricketer
- William Blackman - Sussex cricketer
- Ben Brown - Sussex and Hampshire cricketer
- Dale de Neef - Scotland cricketer
- Alex Gregory - South Australia cricketer
- Arthur Kneller - Hampshire cricketer
- Billy Newham - England and Sussex cricketer
- Toby Peirce - Sussex cricketer
- Paul Phillipson - Sussex cricketer
- Abidine Sakande - Sussex and Leicestershire cricketer
- Valentine Sewell - Dorset cricketer
- Thomas Symington - Rhodesia cricketer

Other

- Alex Malzer - England and Great Britain hockey player

== Industry and commerce ==
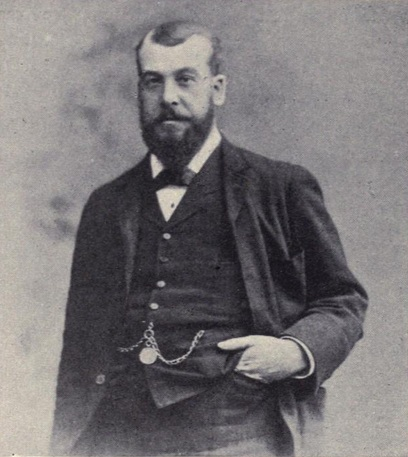
Founder of Crufts dog show Charles Cruft

- Sydney Allard - founder of Allard Motor Company
- Charles Cruft - founder of Crufts dog show
- Sir Charles Fairey - founder of Fairey Aviation Company
- Sir Richard Morris - industrialist

== Military ==
- Leonard Addison - British Indian Army officer
- Peter Piper - submarine commander
- George Reginald Starr - Special Operations Executive agent and leader
- Robert Whittaker - Anti-Aircraft divisional commander

== Religion ==
- Walter Adams, Archbishop of British Columbia and Yukon
- George Browning, Bishop of Canberra and Goulburn
- Dennis Ede, Archdeacon of Stoke
- Gordon Mursell, Bishop of Stafford
- Andrew Norman, Suffragan Bishop in Europe

== Other ==
- Arthur Corbett - Director-General of the Department of Civil Aviation (Australia)
- John Hooper - President of the British Orthodontic Society
