= John Hooper =

John Hooper may refer to:

- John Hooper (Irish politician) (1846–1897), Irish nationalist journalist, politician and MP
- John Hooper (MP for Salisbury) (1532–1572), English politician, MP for Salisbury
- John Hooper (bishop) (c. 1495/1500–1555), English bishop and martyr
- John Hooper (sculptor) (1926–2006), English-born Canadian sculptor
- John Hooper (journalist) (born 1950), British journalist, Southern Europe editor for The Guardian
- John Hooper (marine biologist), Australian marine biologist
- John DeBerniere Hooper (1811–1886), American classical scholar
- John Bobadil Hooper (1878–1928), Australian rules footballer
- John Hooper (Irish statistician) (1878–1930), first director of statistics for the Irish Free State
- John C. Hooper (born 1945), American conservationist
- John Hooper (orthodontist) (1916–2008), British orthodontist
- John Lutrell Hooper, American football player known as Trell Hooper

== See also ==
- Hooper (disambiguation)
