= Peter Piper (disambiguation) =

Peter Piper is a nursery rhyme.

Peter Piper may also refer to:

- Peter Piper (Royal Navy officer) (1913–1995), officer in the Royal Naval Reserve in the Second World War
- "Peter Piper" (song), a song by Run-DMC
- Peter Piper Pizza, an Arizona-based pizza chain
- Peter Piper, a character in the 1932 film After Tomorrow
- Peter Piper Principle, when people confuse words that start with the same letter
