= Charles Cruft =

Charles Cruft may refer to:

- Charles Cruft (general) (1826–1883), Union General during the American Civil War
- Charles Cruft (showman) (1852–1938), English dog show organizer
