= Johnny Hooper =

Johnny Hooper may refer to:

- Johnny Hooper (sailor) (1934–2026), Irish sailor
- Johnny Hooper (water polo) (born 1997), American water polo player

== See also ==
- John Hooper (disambiguation)
