= Claude Hayes =

Claude Hayes may refer to:

- Claude Hayes (artist) (1852–1922), British artist
- Claude Hayes (civil servant) (1912–1996), British civil servant
