= Kneller (surname) =

Godfrey Kneller (1646–1723) was a German-born English portrait painter.

Kneller may also refer to:

- Andreas Kneller (1649–1724), German composer
- Arthur Kneller (1894–1969), English cricketer
- John Kneller (1916-2009), English-American professor and fifth President of Brooklyn College
- Maximilian Kneller (born 1993), German politician
- Scott Kneller (born 1989), Australian freestyle skier

== See also ==
- Kneller Hall, stately home in Twickenham, named after Godfrey Kneller
