= Toby Peirce =

English cricketer

Cricket information
- Batting: Left-handed
- Bowling: Slow left-arm orthodox

Career statistics
Competition	First-class
Matches	69
Runs scored	2,928
Batting average	24.40
100s/50s	2/17
Top score	123
Balls bowled	535
Wickets	3
Bowling average	90.66
5 wickets in innings	0
10 wickets in match	0
Best bowling	1/16
Catches/stumpings	30/–
- Source: CricInfo, 10 October 2022

Michael Toby Edward Peirce (born 14 June 1973) is a retired cricketer who played first-class cricket for Sussex County Cricket Club.

He was educated at Ardingly College, and went on to play 69 times for Sussex between 1994 and 2000.
