= List of SR V "Schools" class locomotives =

Below are the names and numbers of the 40 SR V "Schools" class locomotives designed by Richard Maunsell. Another successful publicity campaign by the Southern Railway when named from 1930 onwards, they represented the public schools of England, initially due to their proximity to the railway that served them, but not all from the SR area. The class naming process consisted of pupils attending these schools visiting "their" engine during the naming ceremonies.

Number		Name	Builder	Built	Withdrawn	Notes	Image
SR	BR	Name	Builder	Built	Withdrawn	Notes	Image
900	30900	Eton	Eastleigh	1930	1962		
901	30901	Winchester	Eastleigh	1930	1962		
902	30902	Wellington	Eastleigh	1930	1962		
903	30903	Charterhouse	Eastleigh	1930	1962		
904	30904	Lancing	Eastleigh	1930	1961		
905	30905	Tonbridge	Eastleigh	1930	1961	Fitted with high sided self trimming tender (ex 30932) from August 1958 to withdrawal.	
906	30906	Sherborne	Eastleigh	1930	1962	Nameplate preserved in the day room of Wallace House	
907	30907	Dulwich	Eastleigh	1930	1961	One nameplate preserved at the college.	
908	30908	Westminster	Eastleigh	1930	1961		
909	30909	St Pauls	Eastleigh	1930	1962		
910	30910	Merchant Taylors	Eastleigh	1932	1961	No apostrophe. One nameplate preserved above entrance to Sixth Form Common Room, and another outside the DT building	
911	30911	Dover	Eastleigh	1932	1962	One nameplate preserved at the college.	
912	30912	Downside	Eastleigh	1932	1962		
913	30913	Christ's Hospital	Eastleigh	1932	1962		
914	30914	Eastbourne	Eastleigh	1932	1961		
915	30915	Brighton	Eastleigh	1933	1962		
916	30916	Whitgift	Eastleigh	1933	1962		
917	30917	Ardingly	Eastleigh	1933	1962	Nameplate preserved at the Staff Room of the college.	
918	30918	Hurstpierpoint	Eastleigh	1933	1961		
919	30919	Harrow	Eastleigh	1933	1961		
920	30920	Rugby	Eastleigh	1933	1961		
921	30921	Shrewsbury	Eastleigh	1933	1962	Nameplate preserved in the Admissions Offices/Registry of the school.	
922	30922	Marlborough	Eastleigh	1933	1961	Nameplates preserved respectively in Norwood Hall dining room and in the Science Block.	
923	30923	Bradfield	Eastleigh	1933	1962	Engine 923 was originally named Uppingham, but was renamed following objections from the school.	
924	30924	Haileybury	Eastleigh	1933	1962	Nameplate preserved in the Library of the school.	
925	30925	Cheltenham	Eastleigh	1934	1962	Preserved as part of the National Collection at the National Railway Museum, York. Currently operational.	
926	30926	Repton	Eastleigh	1934	1962	Currently preserved on the North Yorkshire Moors Railway having been repatriated from North America. Currently operational.	
927	30927	Clifton	Eastleigh	1934	1962		
928	30928	Stowe	Eastleigh	1934	1962	Preserved on the Bluebell Railway. Purchased by Lord Montagu of Beaulieu direct from British Railways service in 1962. Undergoing overhaul as of 2026.	
929	30929	Malvern	Eastleigh	1934	1962		
930	30930	Radley	Eastleigh	1934	1962		
931	30931	King's - Wimbledon	Eastleigh	1934	1961	Name as it appears on a surviving nameplate includes both the apostrophe and the dash	
932	30932	Blundell's	Eastleigh	1935	1961	Fitted with high sided self trimming tender from June 1938 to August 1958 when a tender exchange took place with 30905. The nameplate did include an apostrophe as the product photograph of the model introduced by Hornby in 2009 shows. The locomotive featured in the opening shots of the 1945 film Waterloo Road.	
933	30933	Kings Canterbury	Eastleigh	1935	1961		
934	30934	St Lawrence	Eastleigh	1935	1962		
935	30935	Sevenoaks	Eastleigh	1935	1962	Given a streamlined shroud and numbered 999 but, as far as is known, never left the works in this form	
936	30936	Cranleigh	Eastleigh	1935	1962		
937	30937	Epsom	Eastleigh	1935	1962		
938	30938	St Olaves	Eastleigh	1935	1961		
939	30939	Leatherhead	Eastleigh	1935	1961		

== Remaining artefacts of other class members ==
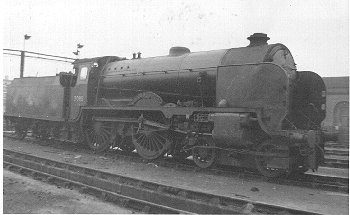
30913 Christ's Hospital in BR days.

When the locomotives were withdrawn from service, BR presented their nameplates to the appropriate schools:

- A nameplate from 900, Eton, is now displayed in the School of Mechanics within Eton College.
- A nameplate from 901, Winchester, is now displayed in the school's Design & Technology Centre, The Mill.
- A nameplate from 903, Charterhouse, was displayed in Charterhouse School's museum until auctioned by the school for £26,000 in 2002. The other nameplate is now displayed in the school's admissions office.
- A nameplate from 905, Tonbridge, is displayed in the Physics Department of Tonbridge School.
- A nameplate from 906, Sherborne, is now displayed in the day-room of one of the boarding houses of Sherborne School.
- A nameplate from 907, Dulwich, is now displayed in Dulwich College by the college's Model Railway Society.
- A nameplate from 908, Westminster, is now displayed in the science block of Westminster School.
- A nameplate from 910, Merchant Taylors', is now displayed outside the sixth form common room of Merchant Taylors' School, Northwood.
- A nameplate from 911, Dover, is now displayed outside the Headmaster's Office at Dover College.
- A nameplate from 912, Downside, is now displayed in Downside School.
- A nameplate from 913 Christ's Hospital, is now displayed in the Model Railway Club at Christ's Hospital.
- A nameplate from 914, Eastbourne, is now displayed in the big school theatre foyer of Eastbourne College.
- A nameplate from 915, Brighton, is now displayed in the DT workshops of Brighton College.
- A nameplate from 916, Whitgift, is now displayed in the Raeburn library at Whitgift School.
- A nameplate from 917, Ardingly, is now displayed in the staff common room of Ardingly College.
- A nameplate from 918, Hurstpierpoint, is now displayed in the science block of Hurstpierpoint College.
- A nameplate from 923, originally named Uppingham, is now displayed in the Undercroft under the great hall of Uppingham School.
- A nameplate from 923, Bradfield, is now displayed in the entrance corridor of the teachers' common room of Bradfield College.
- The nameplates from 924, Haileybury, are now displayed in Haileybury and Imperial Service College Library above a photograph of the locomotive, and in the Archives in Clock House, Haileybury.
- The nameplates from 929, Malvern, are now displayed in Malvern College Memorial Library below a photograph of the locomotive.
- The tender from 929, Malvern, was converted to a snow plough, and was sold by the Maunsell Locomotive Society along with S15 locomotive 830 (to raise money to enable the purchase of 928 Stowe) and both were moved to the North Yorkshire Moors Railway.
- A nameplate from 930, Radley, is now displayed in the stationery department of Radley College's school shop.
- A nameplate from 931, King's - Wimbledon, is now displayed above the door of King's College School gymnasium.
- The nameplate from 932, Blundell's, is now displayed in the History department of Blundell's School.
- A nameplate from 933, Kings Canterbury, is currently displayed in the dining room of The King's School, Canterbury.
- The tender from 934, St Lawrence, was converted to a snow plough, and the frames have been modified to run behind U-class No.1638 on the Bluebell Railway.
- A nameplate from 935, Sevenoaks, is currently displayed in the Science and Technology Centre of Sevenoaks School with a scale model of the locomotive and photographs of Sevenoaks schoolboys 'inspecting' the new loco in 1935. The other nameplate is currently displayed in Arch Three of the Brighton Toy and Model Museum.
- A nameplate from 936, Cranleigh, is currently displayed in the entry lobby of the Headmaster's Office of Cranleigh School.
- A nameplate from 937, Epsom, was displayed in the Library of Epsom College.
- A nameplate from 938, St Olaves, is displayed in the foyer of St Olave's Grammar School.
- A nameplate from 939, Leatherhead, was displayed along with a OO gauge model of the locomotive at St John's School, Leatherhead but was sold in Auction at Great Central Railwayana Auctions, Stoneleigh for £8000 in April 2013.
