= James Simpson (Ugandan politician) =

Ugandan politician

Sir James (Joseph Trevor) Simpson
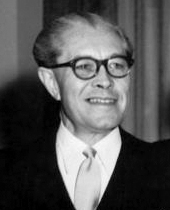

Minister of Economic Affairs
- In office 1962–1963

Personal details
- Born: 9 January 1908
- Died: 10 April 1994 (aged 86) Nairobi, Kenya

Sir James Joseph Trevor Simpson KBE (9 January 1908 – 10 April 1994) was a Ugandan politician who served as Minister of Economic Affairs in the first Cabinet of Uganda.

Simpson, originally of British nationality, was educated at Ardingly College, West Sussex, England, and first saw service in East Africa with the Vacuum Oil Company in Kenya. In 1941 he was elected President of the Uganda Chamber of Commerce, and was re-elected in 1946 and 1950. He became a member of Uganda Legislative Council (1950-1958), the Uganda Executive Council (1952-1955), and a member of the East African Central Legislative Assembly (1957-1960) and (1962-1963). He was Chairman of the Uganda Development Corporation (1952-1964) while director of 37 companies in East Africa, including Chairman of East African Airways (1958–73).

Following Ugandan independence in 1962, Simpson was elected a Member of the Parliament for North East Kyagwe, and served as Minister of Economic Affairs in the first Ugandan Cabinet from 1962 to 1963. He resigned his seat in Parliament in 1964.
