= Ardingly College Chapel =

- Chapel of St Saviour, Ardingly
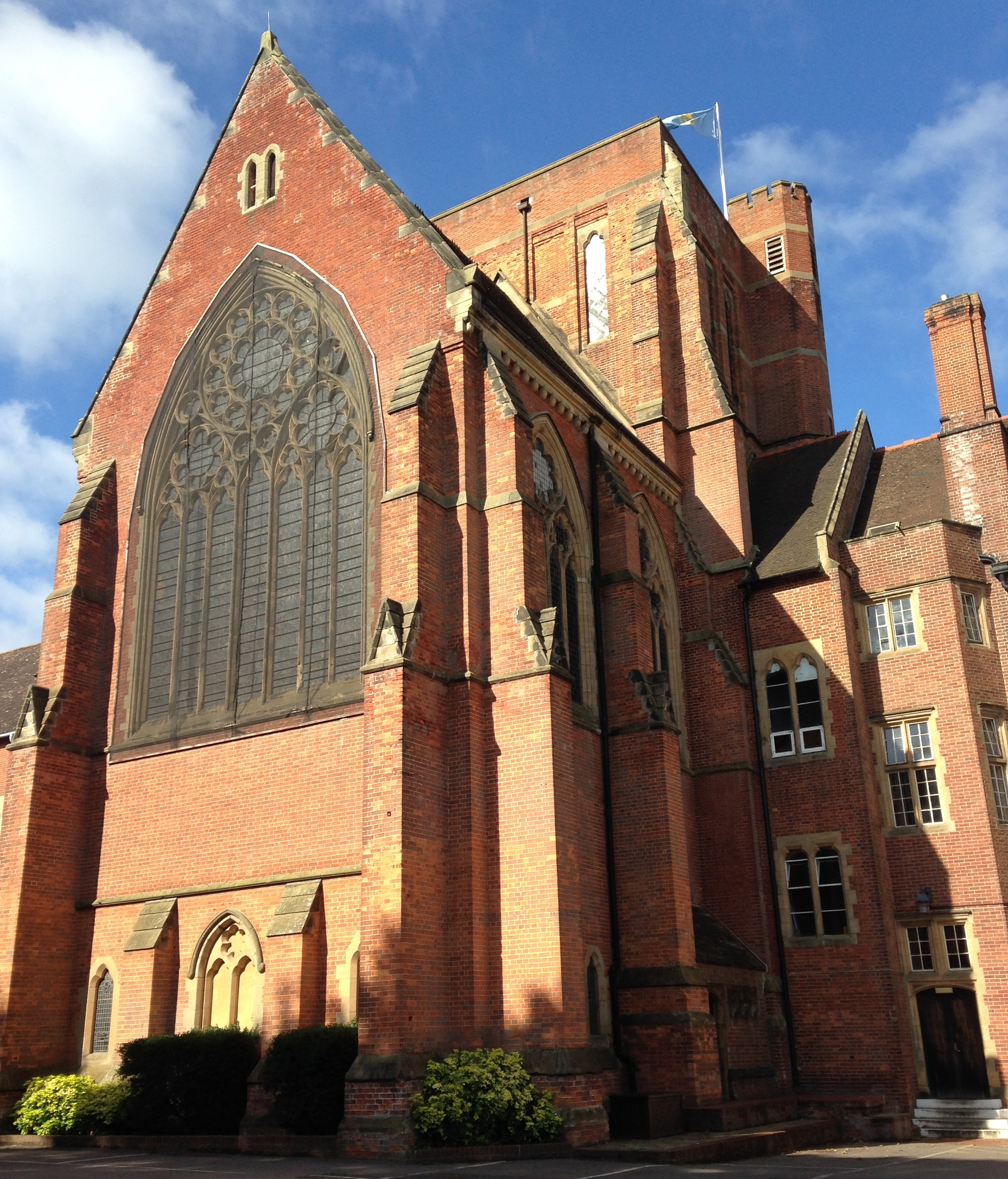

- Location in West Sussex
- 51°02′26″N 00°05′23″W
- Location: Ardingly, West Sussex
- Country: England
- Denomination: Church of England
- Website: Ardingly College Website

History
- Founded: 1858
- Founder: Nathaniel Woodard

Architecture
- Architect: R.H Carpenter/William Slater
- Style: Gothic
- Years built: 1864 to 1892
- Completed: 1892

Clergy
- Bishop: Martin Warner

Listed Building – Grade II
- Official name: Ardingly College
- Designated: 11 May 1983
- Reference no.: 1354803

The Chapel of S. Saviour is the chapel to Ardingly College in West Sussex, England, and is considered an example of Gothic Revival architecture. The chapel was designed by R.H Carpenter and William Slater. The foundation stone of the college chapel was laid in 1864 and finished in 1892 The chapel was dedicated to St Saviour, and built predominantly of brick. It is a Grade II listed building. The current provost is The Rt Revd Jonathan Meyrick.
