= Valentine Sewell =

English cricketer

Personal information
- Full name: Valentine Evelyn Sewell
- Born: 12 April 1910; Kendal, Westmorland, England
- Died: 8 May 1978 (aged 68); Yeovil, Somerset, England
- Batting: Unknown
- Bowling: Unknown

Domestic team information
- Years: Team
- 1931/32–1932/33: Europeans (India)
- 1928: Dorset

Career statistics
Competition	First-class
Matches	2
Runs scored	42
Batting average	21.00
100s/50s	–/–
Top score	25*
Balls bowled	138
Wickets	–
Bowling average	–
5 wickets in innings	–
10 wickets in match	–
Best bowling	–
Catches/stumpings	1/–
- Source: Cricinfo, 20 November 2011

Valentine Evelyn Sewell (12 April 1910 – 8 May 1978) was an English cricketer. Sewell's batting and bowling styles are unknown. He was born in Kendal, Westmorland and educated at Ardingly College in Sussex.

Sewell made two appearances for Dorset in the 1928 Minor Counties Championship against Cornwall and Wiltshire. Later, while in the British Raj, Sewell made two first-class appearances for the Europeans against Indians in the 1931–32 and 1932–33 Madras Presidency Matches. In the 1931–32 match, he scored 25 not out in the Europeans first-innings, while in their second-innings he wasn't required to bat. He also bowled a total of eighteen wicketless overs in the match. In the 1932–33 match, he was dismissed for a single run in the Europeans first-innings by Morappakam Gopalan, while in their second-innings he was dismissed by Shahabuddin for 16 runs.

During World War II he was called up as an Emergency Commission with the rank of 2nd Lieutenant on 26 October 1940. He died at Yeovil, Somerset on 8 May 1978.
