= Abidine Sakande =

English cricketer (born 1994)

Personal information
- Full name: Abidine Sakande
- Born: 22 September 1994 (age 32); Chester, Cheshire, England
- Batting: Right-handed
- Bowling: Right-arm medium
- Role: Bowler

Domestic team information
- Years: Team
- 2014–2015: Oxford University
- 2015–2016: Oxford MCCU
- 2016–2019: Sussex (squad no. 11)
- 2021: Leicestershire (squad no. 20)
- First-class debut: 30 June 2014 Oxford v Cambridge
- List A debut: 2 August 2016 Sussex v Kent

Career statistics
Competition	FC	LA
Matches	21	10
Runs scored	174	11
Batting average	10.87	2.75
100s/50s	0/0	0/0
Top score	33	7*
Balls bowled	2,931	431
Wickets	47	9
Bowling average	36.89	55.44
5 wickets in innings	1	0
10 wickets in match	0	n/a
Best bowling	5/43	2/53
Catches/stumpings	8/–	3/–
- Source: CricketArchive, 25 September 2021

Abidine Sakande (born 22 September 1994) is an English cricketer who played for Sussex County Cricket Club. He is a right-arm medium bowler who also bats right-handed.

Sakande was born in Chester to a father who had immigrated from Burkina Faso. He was educated at Ardingly College and St John's College, Oxford. Sakande made his first-class debut for Oxford University Cricket Club in the University Match in 2014. He spent the 2016–17 off-season playing club cricket in New Zealand.

Sakande declined Sussex's offer of a contract extension in 2019, and left the club at the end of the season.

Sakande joined Leicestershire during the 2021 season playing three County Championship matches.
