= Richard Morris (chemical engineer) =

British engineer and industrialist

Sir Richard Morris CBE
- Born: James Richard Samuel Morris; 20 November 1925; London, England, UK
- Died: 1 July 2008 (aged 82); Derby, England, UK
- Education: Ardingly College
- Alma mater: University of Birmingham
- Spouse: Marion
- Children: 4

Sir James Richard Samuel Morris CBE (20 November 1925 – 1 July 2008), also known as Dick Morris, was a British engineer and industrialist.

Richard Morris was born in London, the son of a banker. He was a boy chorister at All Souls, Langham Place, and was educated at Ardingly College. He began to train to be a doctor, before changing career and serving in the Welsh Guards, rising to Captain, and served in Palestine (region) as Israel was being created. He received a bachelor's degree in chemical engineering from the University of Birmingham.

Morris worked for Courtaulds for almost 30 years, and then various other companies. In 1981 he received an Honorary Doctorate from the University of Bath. He was chairman and managing director of Brown & Root from 1980 to 1990.
