= William Blackman (cricketer) =

English cricketer (1862–1885)

Personal information
- Born: 27 November 1862; Arundel, Sussex, England
- Died: 2 June 1885 (aged 22); Fitzroy, Victoria, Australia
- Batting: Right-handed
- Bowling: Right-arm fast

Domestic team information
- Years: Team
- 1881–1884: Sussex
- FC debut: 4 July 1881 Sussex v Hampshire
- Last FC: 8 September 1884 Sussex v Surrey

Career statistics
Competition	First-class
Matches	34
Runs scored	1,070
Batting average	18.44
100s/50s	0/5
Top score	89
Balls bowled	4,438
Wickets	87
Bowling average	21.63
5 wickets in innings	4
10 wickets in match	0
Best bowling	7/86
Catches/stumpings	21/–
- Source: Cricinfo, 9 January 2009

William Blackman (27 November 1862 – 2 June 1885) was a cricketer who played first-class cricket for Sussex County Cricket Club. He was educated at Ardingly College and played 34 times for Sussex between 1881 and 1884. Suffering from poor health, he then moved to Melbourne, Australia, where he died of tuberculosis at the age of 22 within a few months.
