= Mark Vernon =

British psychotherapist and writer

Mark Vernon is a British psychotherapist, writer and former Anglican priest.

== Biography ==
Educated at Ardingly College, Vernon studied physics at Durham University, where he was a member of St John's College, and graduated with a Bachelor of Science (BSc) degree in 1989. He received a PhD in ancient Greek philosophy from the University of Warwick.

Vernon trained for ordination at St Stephen's House, Oxford, between 1990 and 1993. During this time, he also studied for a Bachelor of Theology (BTh) degree at the University of Oxford. He was ordained in the Church of England as a deacon in 1993 and as a priest in 1994. He served his curacy at St Cuthbert's Church, Billingham, in the Diocese of Durham. His bishop, David Jenkins, was liberal and allowed him to serve as long as he kept his homosexuality "discreet". Three years after his ordination, he left the church, having been unable to live with the lie any longer; "you internalise the charge of being an abomination. You live a lie. And like any lived lie, insidious psychological damage is the price."

Vernon is the author of several books on subjects from friendship and belief, to wellbeing and love, including A Secret History of Christianity: Jesus, the Last Inkling, and the Evolution of Consciousness (2019), based upon the ideas of the Oxford Inkling, Owen Barfield, Dante's Divine Comedy: A Guide for the Spiritual Journey., and most recently, Spiritual Intelligence in Seven Steps.

He is a columnist for The Idler, and has written for Aeon, Church Times and The Tablet, amongst other publications. He has appeared on BBC Radio 4's Moral Maze, In Our Time, alongside other programmes, and also regularly podcasts and posts YouTubes, including the Sheldrake-Vernon Dialogues with Rupert Sheldrake.

Vernon has a private psychotherapy practice and has also worked at the Maudsley Hospital.

== Works ==
- Spiritual Intelligence in Seven Steps, Iff Books: 2022
- Dante's Divine Comedy: A Guide for the Spiritual Journey, Angelico Press: 2021
- A Secret History of Christianity: Jesus, the Last Inkling and the Evolution of Consciousness, John Hunt Publishing: 2019
- The Idler Guide To Ancient Philosophy, Idler Books: 2015
- Carl Jung: How to believe, Guardian Shorts: 2013
- Love: All That Matters, Hodder Education: 2013
- God: The Big Questions, Quercus: 2012
- God: All That Matters, Hodder Education: 2012
- How To Be An Agnostic, Palgrave Macmillan: 2011
- The Good Life, Hodder Education: 2010
- The Meaning of Friendship, Palgrave Macmillan: 2010
- Plato’s Podcasts: The Ancients' Guide to Modern Living, Oneworld: 2009
- Dictionary of Beliefs and Religions (Editor in Chief), Chambers Harrap: 2009
- Teach Yourself Humanism, Hodder Education: 2008
- Wellbeing, Acumen: 2008 – in The Art of Living series that he edited
- 42: Deep Thought on Life, the Universe and Everything, Oneworld: 2008
- What Not To Say: Finding the Right Words at Difficult Moments, Weidenfeld and Nicolson: 2007
- Business: The Key Concepts, Routledge: 2002
