= Alistair Morrison =

British photographer (born 1956)

Alistair Neil Morrison
- Born: November 4, 1956 (age 69); Lima, Peru
- Education: Ardingly College; Harrow College
- Occupations: Photographer; filmmaker
- Website: https://alistairmorrison.com

Alistair Neil Morrison (born November 4, 1956) is a British photographer, known for his work with celebrity portraits and his charitable Legacy projects, including Time to Reflect, Time to Pause, and Time to Connect. More than 80 pieces of his work are held in the primary collection of the National Portrait Gallery, London.

== Early life and education ==
Morrison was born in Lima, Peru. His father, Jamie Ian Morrison, worked in telecommunications for Cable & Wireless Communications in Bermuda, where he met and married Aileen Rose Morrison (née Wingate). Following his posting to South America, the family lived in Peru, Chile, and Argentina, where Morrison spent much of his early childhood.

Upon leaving school, Morrison initially began work at the Bank of England before discovering a deeper interest in the visual arts. At the age of twenty-one, he enrolled as a photography student at Harrow College.

== Professional career ==
In 1981, during his final year of college, Morrison undertook a six-week project photographing buskers in the London Underground. The resulting collection, Grassroots, was subsequently exhibited in the National Theatre in London. A review of Morrison's work around this time commended his technical proficiency, and notes his "thoughtful approach to the everyday subjects he chooses."

Shortly thereafter, Morrison began receiving commissions for celebrity portraits, working with publications including Vogue, The Observer, The Sunday Times, YOU Magazine, and Esquire, among others.

The beginnings of Morrison's professional career coincided with a broader movement advocating for photography to be recognised with major institutional art collections. This shift was recognised by the 1986 exhibition Twenty for Today at the National Portrait Gallery in London, in which Morrison was invited to exhibit alongside a cohort of emerging British photographers gaining recognition as significant contemporary voices.

Morrison continued to exhibit his work internationally, with shows held in cities including Paris, New York, Palm Beach, Miami, Florence, Berlin, Barcelona, and London. He lived in New York for five years, and worked for a number of publications across America.

At the turn of the millennium, Morrison collaborated with UNICEF on Time to Reflect, a portrait project involving hundreds of celebrities and public figures from the fields of music, sport, film and politics. Participants were invited to create self-portraits using a photobooth and contribute written reflections marking the new millennium. Morrison explained, "One of the key themes of this millennium is the fact that we all have an identity and we all have a right to our say. The passport photograph is a universal means of establishing your identity and we were also asking people to identify themselves through the message they give to the world." The project was published as a book in 2002, serialised in The Daily Telegraph, and was the subject of a documentary, Face Booth, with ongoing contributions throughout the 2000s.

Morrison has produced a series of Legacy photographs, applying his style of portraiture to curated group images of notable actors ("The Actors' Last Supper"), sportsmen ("Waiting for Lomu, the World's Greatest Rugby Players"), Britons ("Great Britons"), musicians ("Searching for Apollo"), chefs ("Chefs' Legacy"), and Bermudians ("An Island's Legacy — Postcards from Bermuda").

In 2017, Morrison (in collaboration with Sir Roger Daltrey, and in aid of Teenage Cancer Trust and Teen Cancer America) created "Searching for Apollo", the first of The Adoration Trilogy. The altarpiece — a forty-panel triptych featuring over 70 iconic men in music, including members of The Beatles, Queen, and Led Zeppelin, among others — was unveiled at the Victoria & Albert Museum in November 2017. The musicians were photographed individually in various settings across the UK and America, and staged against a background of stone archways and tunnels. Morrison told GQ:

The title of the exhibition, Searching For Apollo, is born of the theme of Apollo as the god of music and 'search', which is buscar in Spanish - the origin of busking. So with that idea in mind, it seemed nice to do something looking back at these artists' roots, to get everyone back on the street.

— Alistair Morrison, GQ

In 2020, Morrison created two documentary films: The Real You, a personal exploration of his pursuit for photographic authenticity, and Time to Pause, created in response to the COVID-19 pandemic. The latter was awarded Best Public Awareness Cause Campaign at the 2021 Purpose Awards.

Morrison's ongoing project, Immune from Praise and Abuse, marks a departure from celebrity portraiture. The series is focused on authenticity, and sees Morrison turn his lens toward capturing the individual truths of "ordinary, yet extraordinary, people."

In 2023, Morrison began to journey across all 100 counties of the United Kingdom in a converted camper van, repurposed as a mobile studio. In this project, Time to Connect, Morrison engages with local artists and creatives in the creation of a national arts trail, intended to serve as a visual portrait of the nation.

Morrison is a regular invitee to give talks about his works and career to museums and academic institutions. He has conducted courses at The Courtauld Institute of Art, leading discussion on the nature and theory of portrait photography, and examining its historical context. A selection of Morrison's portraits were exhibited alongside impressionist works from The Courtauld's collection.

== Celebrity portraits ==
Morrison's celebrity portraiture includes:

- Brian May
- Shirley Bassey
- Kenneth Branagh
- Colin Firth
- Paul McCartney
- Twiggy
- Robert Plant
- Ian McKellen
- George Harrison
- Margaret Thatcher
- Penelope Cruz
- Rowan Atkinson
- Emma Thompson
- Ralph Fiennes
- Daniel Day-Lewis
- Tom Cruise
- Elton John
- Liam Gallagher
- Noel Gallagher
- Bob Geldof
- Barbara Windsor
- Tom Jones
- Ringo Starr
- Jude Law
- Gareth Edwards
- Judi Dench
- Laurence Olivier
- Tom Hanks
- Alec Guinness
- Joan Collins
- Van Morrison
- Billy Idol
- Pierce Brosnan
- Julie Walters
- Bette Davis
- Flora Duffy
- David Gilmour
- Kristin Scott Thomas
- Ben Kingsley
- Andy Murray
- Jeff Beck
- Ozzy Osbourne
- John Gielgud
- Mary Berry
- Bruce Springsteen
- Kate Winslet
- Jilly Cooper
- Linford Christie
- Steve Redgrave
- Dame Darcey Bussell
- Rachel Weisz
- Robbie Williams
- Alice Cooper
- Eric Clapton
- Slash
- Helen Mirren
- Anthony Hopkins
- Iggy Pop
- Kelly Holmes
- Harry Secombe
- Ronnie Wood
- Smokey Robinson
- Tom Stoppard
- Catherine Zeta Jones
- Roger Taylor
- Joan Plowright
- Ray Davies
- Chris Hoy
- Zandra Rhodes
- Kylie Minogue
- John Paul Jones
- Bryan Adams
- Elvis Costello
- Donovan
- Dame Zaha Hadid
- Rod Stewart
- Roger Daltrey
- Paul Weller
- Pete Townshend
- Barry Gibb
- Margaret Atwood
- Art Garfunkel
- Carl Palmer
- Ali Campbell
- Oliver Reed
- Mark Knopfler
- Henry Kissinger
- Sting

== Exhibitions ==
Exhibitions of Morrison's work include:

- Morrison at The Courtauld — The Courtauld Institute of Art, London, April 2023
- Immune from Praise and Abuse — Gurr Johns, London, March 2021
- The Actors' Last Supper — Fortnum & Mason, London, March 2020
- Chefs' Legacy — Fortnum & Mason, London, March 2020
- An Island's Legacy — Postcards from Bermuda — Hamilton Princess, Bermuda, September 2018
- Searching for Apollo — Victoria & Albert Museum, London, November 2017
- Great Britons — Sea Containers, London, December 2016
- Waiting for Lomu, World's Greatest Rugby Squad — The World Rugby Museum, London, Permanent Exhibition
- Triple Exposure — Forman's Smokehouse Gallery, London, June 2014
- Form, Fame, and Fuma Divina — The House of Nobleman, London, February 2012
- "The Actors' Last Supper" Portraits by Contemporary Photographers — National Portrait Gallery, London, September 2012-July 2013
- Time to Reflect — The Bluebird, London, April 2012
- Comedians: From the 1940s to Now — National Portrait Gallery, London, September 2011-January 2012
- My Kingdom for a Horse, Ascot Racecourse, Ascot, January–December 2011
- Alistair Morrison at 75 Wall Street — KiptonART Gallery, New York, September 2010
- Hidden Gems — Getty Images Gallery, London, September 2009
- Nudes: A Country Collection — Linley, London, May–June 2008
- The Naked Portrait: 1900-2007 — Compton Verney, Warwick, September–December 2007
- The Naked Portrait: 1900-2007 — National Galleries of Scotland, Edinburgh, June–September 2007,
- An Olympic Portfolio — National Portrait Gallery, London, 1996
- In Close Up: Laurence Olivier, An 80th Birthday Tribute — National Portrait Gallery, London, May–November 1987
- Stars of the British Screen: From the Thirties to the Present Day — National Portrait Gallery, London, December 1985-March 1986
- Twenty for Today — National Portrait Gallery, London, May–August 1986

== Books ==
- Time to Reflect (2002)
- Time to Reflect II (2007)
- Hidden Gems (2009)

== Films ==
Morrison has created two films. The Real You, written by Morrison, is a short film that marked his fortieth year as a photographer and explores his career and search for photographic truth in portraiture.

In 2020, Morrison wrote, directed, and produced Time to Pause, documenting a series of personal testimonies from individuals around the world, reflecting on their experiences of the COVID-19 pandemic. The film premiered at the Göteborg Film Festival in 2021.

The film explores the many negative and positive contrasts of lockdown, a different dawn of creativity in art, dance and music, as well as reflecting on everything from parcel-washing to pot-banging and conversations through windows.

— Julie Hamill, "Time to Pause in the Heart of London", OnLondon

== Collections ==
- National Portrait Gallery, London: 83 Prints (as of 21 October 2025)

== Charity ==
Morrison has worked with and supported a number of charities throughout his career, including:

- Global Dignity
- The Hope Foundation UK
- Variety, the Children's Charity
- UNICEF
- Teen Cancer America
- Teenage Cancer Trust
- Cancer Research UK
- Royal National Institute of Blind People
- Prostate Cancer UK
- Miner2Major
- SSAFA, The Armed Forces Charity
- The Felix Project
- The Stroke Foundation
- Battersea Dogs and Cats Home
- The J9 Foundation
- Greener Henley
- Great Ormond Street Hospital
- NSPCC
- Shakespeare Schools Festival
