= John Hooper (orthodontist) =

- Born: 7 April 1916; London
- Died: 12 December 2008 (aged 92)
- Education: Royal Dental Hospital
- Known for: Being the first orthodontic consultant to National Health Services of England
- Medical career
- Profession: Dentist
- Sub-specialties: Orthodontist

John Hooper (7 April 1916 – 12 December 2008) was a British orthodontist who was appointed as the first Dental Consultant in Orthodontics of the National Health Services of Britain to the Wessex Regional Health Board.

== Life ==
He was born in 1916 and attended Ardingly College. He then attended the Royal Dental Hospital where he received his degree in dentistry. He then joined the staff of the hospital as an orthodontist until World War II when he became part of the Red Cross. During the war, Hooper was captured in Belgium during the retreat to Dunkirk in 1940. He spent five years as a prisoner of war at Stalag Luft III. He came back to the UK in 1945.

After his return he joined the Royal Victoria Hospital in Bournemouth in 1950. He eventually became an orthodontic consultant to the National Health Service. His appointment to the National Health Services determined the future delivery of orthodontics in the country. He was also an advisor to the Dental Estimates Board. He died in 2009.

He was married to Sybil in 1945. They had one son, David, and one daughter, Sheila.

== Awards & Positions ==
- British Orthodontic Society - President (1967)
- Consultant Orthodontics Group - Founding Member, President (1970)
