= Claude Hayes (civil servant) =

British civil servant

Sir Claude James Hayes KCMG (23 March 1912 – 20 November 1996) was a British civil servant who was Chairman of Crown Agents for Oversea Governments and Administrations from 1968 to 1974.

He was educated at Ardingly College, graduated with a first class degree from St Edmund Hall, Oxford. He held a fellowship at the Sorbonne and was briefly a tutor at New College, Oxford.

He was made KCMG in 1974, having been made CMG in 1969.
