= Charles Cruft (showman) =

British dog showman and businessperson (1852 - 1938)

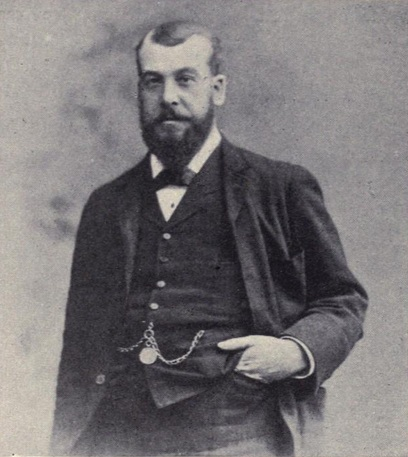
- A photograph of Charles Cruft, published in 1902
- Born: 28 June 1852
- Died: 10 September 1938 (aged 86); Highbury, London, England
- Resting place: Highgate Cemetery; 51.5679°N 0.1488°W
- Education: Ardingly College, Sussex; Birkbeck College, London
- Occupations: Show promoter and businessman
- Known for: Crufts Dog Show
- Spouses: Charlotte Hutchinson (first wife); Emma Isabel Hartshorn (second wife)
- Children: 4
- Parent: Charles Cruft (father)

Charles Alfred Cruft (28 June 1852 – 10 September 1938) was a British showman who founded the Crufts dog show. Cruft first became involved with dogs when he began to work at Spratt's, a manufacturer of dog biscuits. He rose to the position of general manager, and whilst working for Spratt's in France he was invited to run his first dog show at the 1878 Exposition Universelle. After running dog shows in London for four years, he ran his first Cruft's dog show in 1891, and continued to run a further 45 shows until his death in 1938, as well as running two cat shows in 1894 and 1895. He was involved in a range of dog breed clubs, including that for Schipperkes, Pugs and Borzois. He and his wife upheld a story that they never owned a dog, and instead owned a cat, however Cruft admitted to owning at least one Saint Bernard in his memoirs, published posthumously.

== Early life and Spratts ==
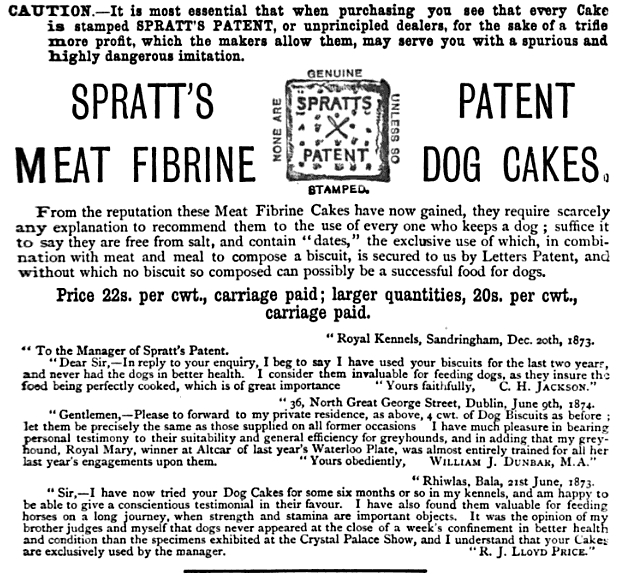
An 1876 advert for Spratt's Patent Meat Fibrine Dog Cakes, featuring the cross "trademark" that Cruft introduced

Charles Cruft was born on 28 June 1852, one of four children. In his youth, Charles attended Ardingly College in Sussex, and Birkbeck College in London. Cruft first followed in his father's footsteps by becoming a manufacturing jeweller but he ultimately decided that the career was not for him and left the business in 1865.

He went on to apply for the post of office boy in the Holborn shop of James Spratt, the manufacturer of Spratt's dog biscuits. He was recruited by Spratt, who would later go on to say that Cruft had lent forward in the interview at one point whilst talking about the business and said "You know, I think this kind of business ought to do very well, I do honestly." Cruft overhauled the bookkeeping in the shop, changing it from a system using crosses to distinguish between wholesale and retail customers to a far more detailed system. The Maltese cross that was previously used in the bookkeeping was later instead stamped onto the biscuits as a type of trademark to distinguish Spratt's biscuits from other dog biscuits.

Several months after joining, Crufts convinced Spratt to hire a new boy to work in the shop to free himself up to solicit orders for the dog biscuits from gamekeepers, promoters of dog shows and the like. He saw a connection between improved feeding and purebred dogs, and so supported the foundation of canine societies. As part of this new role, he was expected to have attended the "Grand National Exhibitions of Sporting and other Dogs" at The Crystal Palace, London, annually between 1870 and 1872. These early shows were unsuccessful financially and were not continued. Whilst at Spratt's, Cruft gradually rose to the role of general manager, after being head of their Show Department for several years. At the age of 26, some twelve years after leaving the jewellery business, Cruft was made office manager. The Spratt's dog biscuits became the forerunner of the modern dry dog food, and under Cruft's work the company went from a single small shop to the British leader in these types of products.

== Conformation shows ==
In 1878, still working for Spratt's, Cruft travelled across Europe to expand the biscuit business. Whilst in France promoting Spratt's dog cake, he was invited to run the dog show at the third World's Fair, known as the Exposition Universelle. Further offers to run shows came in for Cruft, including an offer to become Secretary of the Dutch Kennel Club, and an offer to run the livestock section of the Brussels and Antwerp International Exhibitions. He took up job offers to run the shows for the Scottish Kennel Club, and became manager of the poultry section of the shows of the Royal Agricultural Society. He also co-founded and became club secretary of the Schipperke Club of Brussels.

By the time Cruft turned 30 in 1882, Spratts had been sold to Edward Wylan who in turn promoted Charles first to "Chief Traveller", and then to general manager. Under Crufts guidance, the company diversified its product base and expanded into game bird and poultry food markets, as well as producing a range of accessories for cats and dogs. Cruft himself became secretary of the Toy Spaniel Club and the Pug Dog Club. He was also involved in clubs which promoted the Saint Bernard and Borzoi breeds.

In 1886, Cruft was approached to run a dog show for terriers in London by the Duchess of Newcastle, and so on 10 March his show opened at the Royal Aquarium in Westminster, London. Entitled "The first Great Show of all kinds of Terriers", the show received 570 entries across 57 classes and included Lord Alfred Paget among the patrons. Collies and several breeds of toy dogs were added by 1890.

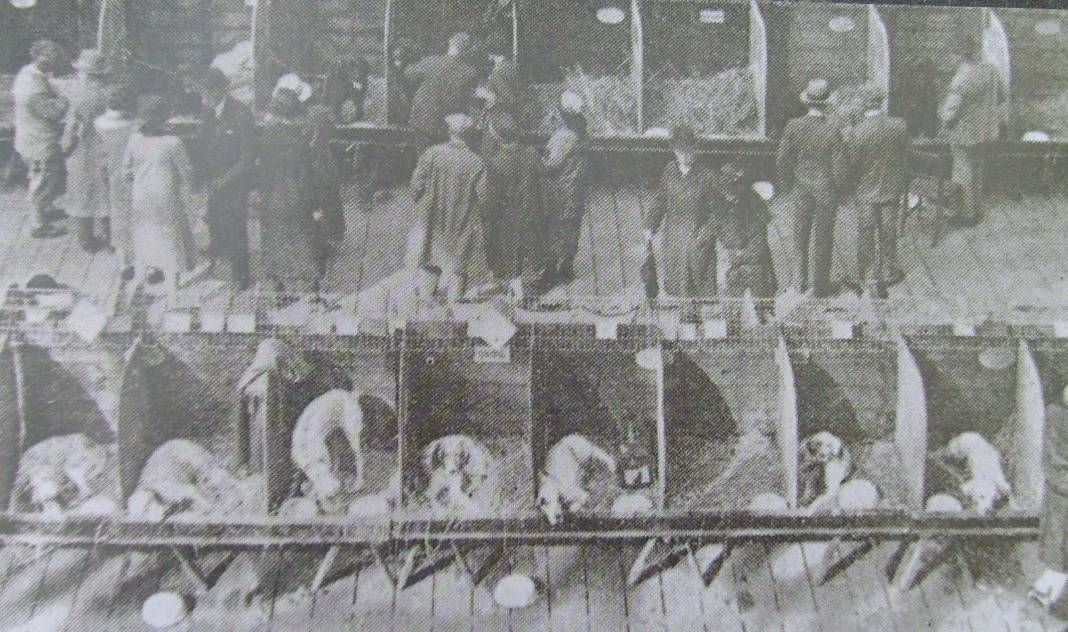
Dogs on display at the 1891 Cruft's dog show

This gradual expansion of breeds led to the creation of the first show to be named after Cruft was in 1891, when "Cruft's Greatest Dog Show" was held at the Royal Agricultural Hall, Islington, with part of the deal to hold the show at that location was to restrict the venue to only allowing Cruft to run dog shows at the location. He designed the logo himself, the head of a Saint Bernard surrounded by a collar with a crown on top. He introduced a system where competitors would pay to enter their dogs, and make additional payments if they wished to take the dogs away each night of the three-day competition, and again pay if they wanted to take them away early on the final day. By 1914, the show had grown in popularity until it was recognised as the largest dog show in the world and by 1936 when the show celebrated its Golden Jubilee, over 10,000 dogs were entered at the event. Cruft's shows were frequented by Royalty, with Queen Victoria exhibiting dogs, and King Edward VII also doing so prior to becoming King. In 1893, Tsar Alexander III of Russia sent eighteen Borzois to compete, and from 1916 King George V entered his Labrador Retrievers regularly.

On 7 and 8 March 1894, he experimented with expanding his shows and held his first Cat conformation show. The first show had over 600 entries, becoming easily the biggest of its kind so far, with patrons that included the Duchess of Newcastle, the Countess of Sefton and Lady de Trafford. The publication Fur and Feather praised the new venture and encouraged more. Crufts however wasn't so sure as the initial show had lost over a hundred pounds, and entries in some of the classes were restricted to only a handful of cats. He held a second show in March 1895, which once again Fur and Feather heaped praise upon, despite the cutbacks that Cruft had initiated to make the show more profitable. Fur and Feather announced in March 1896 that the cat show had been postponed due to Cruft's other business commitments, but he never went on to run such a show again.

In 1896, Cruft designed special train carriages to carry competition dogs for his shows from around the country. Cruft was Secretary of the Ranelagh Fox Terrier Show in 1901, and together with several colleagues including Sir Humphrey de Trafford created the National Terrier Club, and from the second show onwards on 21 June 1902, the show became known as the National Terrier Show. Cruft continued as Secretary of the club until 1914 when Sir William Savory took on the role.

Despite the fact that he gave away very few details about himself to the press, to make them concentrate more on promotion of his shows, he did not always see eye to eye with all members of the media. One newspaper refused to publish his name at all, and whenever it made reference to Cruft's dog shows, it simply referred to them as "a dog show in Islington".

== Death and legacy ==
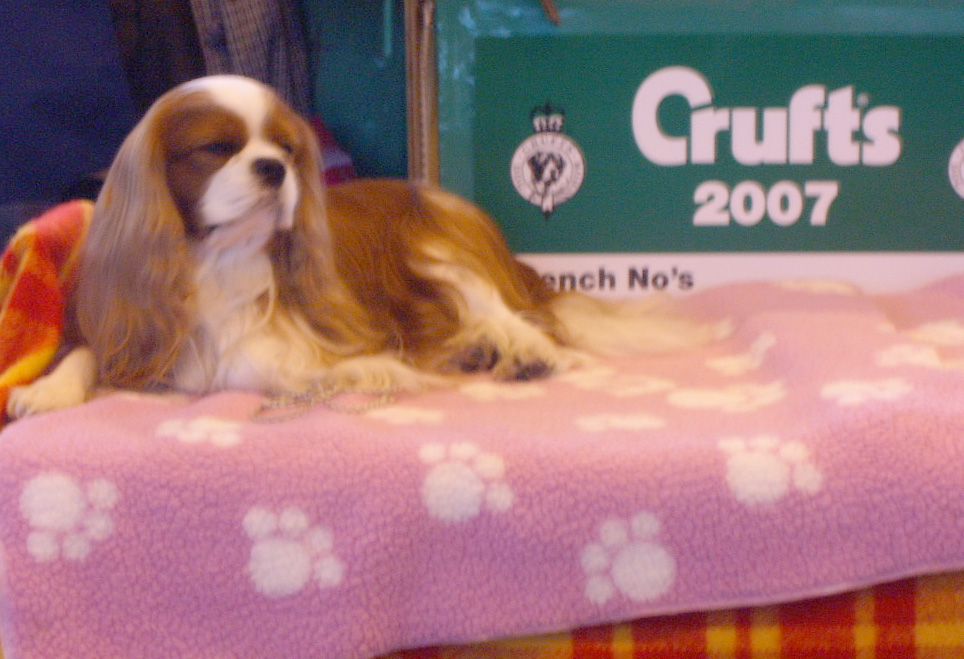
A Cavalier King Charles Spaniel at the Crufts dog show in 2007

After running his 45th Crufts show in 1938, he fell ill. By the late summer he was recovering, but he died due to a heart attack at around 5:30 am on 10 September. Tributes came in from media agencies, with Our Dogs calling him "the man who made dog shows", and comparisons with the American showman P. T. Barnum.

The funeral occurred on 21 September. Cruft was buried in a tomb in the western area of Highgate Cemetery, London. It would become Grade II listed on 14 May 1974. The London Borough of Islington placed a plaque commemorating Charles Cruft at Ashurst Lodge, Highbury Grove, N5.

His will left £30476 9s 3d to his family and friends, with the majority going to his second wife, Emma, and £2000 going to his daughter Clara. Two grandchildren, Charles and Betty Cruft each received £500, and two nephews, Kenneth and John Hartshorn, each received the same. Eight nieces, one great nephew and a young cousin each received £50. One of his maids, Kate Hempstead, who had worked for him for over thirty years also received £50. His cousin Lt Arthur Cruft received £100, while Cruft's secretary Miss E. Harrington, who had worked on the Crufts dog shows since 1925 received £500.

At the time of his death in 1938, it was thought that his wife, Emma Cruft, would continue to run the dog shows with the help of the show's secretary, Miss Hardingham. After running the show in 1939, Mrs Cruft sold the show to The Kennel Club, however due to World War II, it was not until 1948 when they ran the show for the first time. The show would remain being called Cruft's until 1974, when during a rebrand the apostrophe was dropped, resulting in the show being called Crufts, which it continues to be called at the present.

== Family life ==
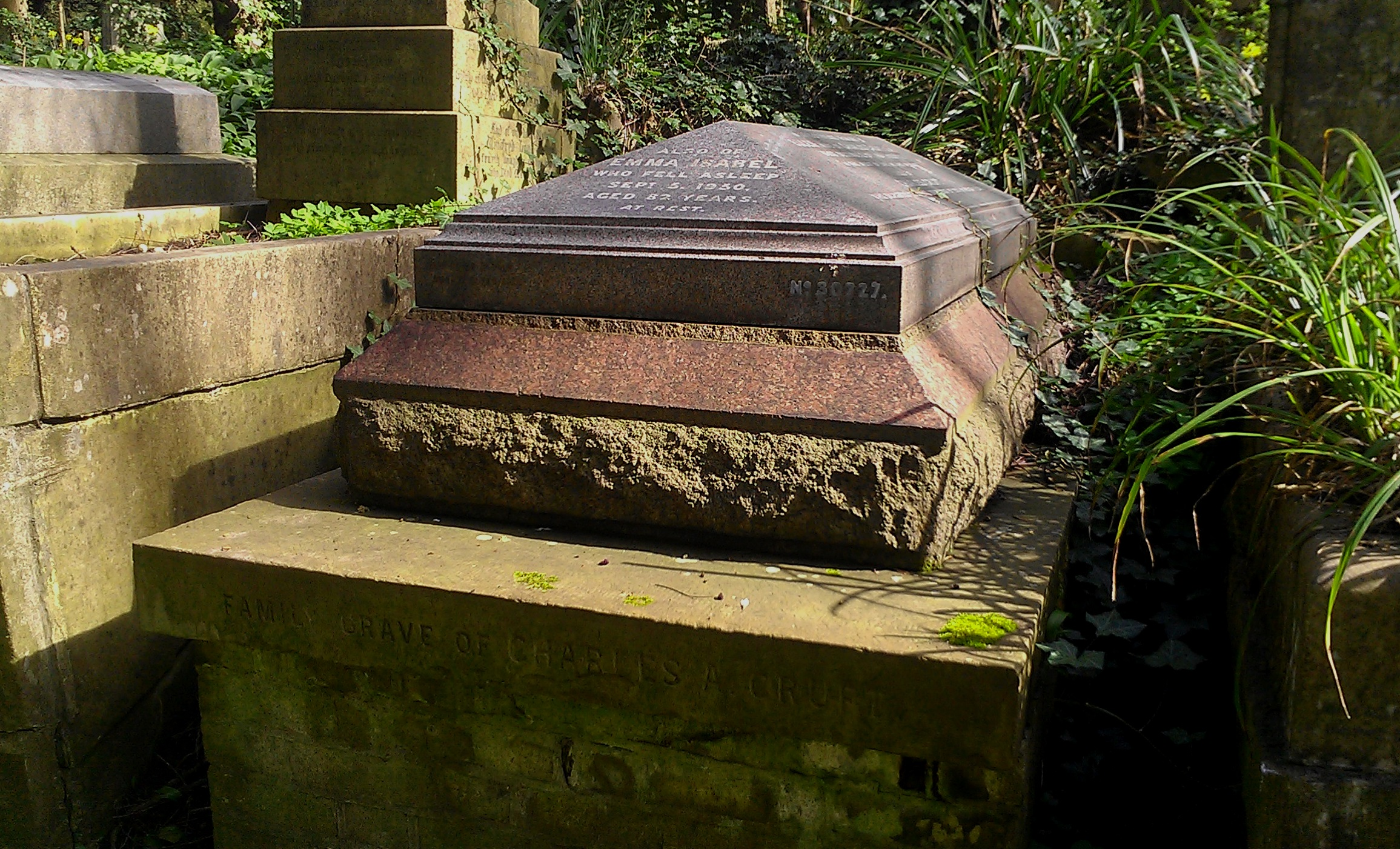
Family tomb of Charles Cruft in the western end of Highgate Cemetery

Cruft's first marriage was to Charlotte Hutchinson in 1878. Together they had four children, Charles Francis, Louise, Cecil Arthur and Clara Helen Grace. His second marriage was to Emma Isabel Hartshorn in 1894, they had no children. He remained in close contact with his children, and involved each of them in the dog show business. Such was the relationship with his daughter Clara, who was nicknamed "Birdie", that she alone was listed in his second wife's will as a step daughter.

His wife Emma stated in her book, Mrs Charles Cruft's Famous Dog Book, published in 1949 that there was an unwritten rule that both herself and her husband could not own any dogs for fear of making others believe that they favoured one breed over another, even going as far to say "we were determined to own a pet, so we took the least line of resistance and kept a – CAT!" This was disproved in Cruft's memoirs, published posthumously in Charles Cruft's Dog Book in 1952, where Cruft explained that he had lived in households which had Alsatians and Borzois. He went on to make particular reference to the fact that he and his wife Emma had owned at least one Saint Bernard; the same breed of dog he had used in his creation of the Crufts logo.

At the time of the United Kingdom Census 1901, Cruft was living at 325 Holloway Road, N7, with his wife Emma, his father Charles, a boarder named Albert Causfield and a servant named Alice Gregory. He listed his profession as "show promoter". Emma would go on to outlive Charles, she died at the age of 82 on 5 September 1950. At the time of his death, he was living at 12 Highbury Grove, London, N5. His staff included a cook, a chauffeur, two maids and a gardener. Additionally, he owned a country home called Windmill Farm, in Coulsdon, Surrey.
