= Schipperke =

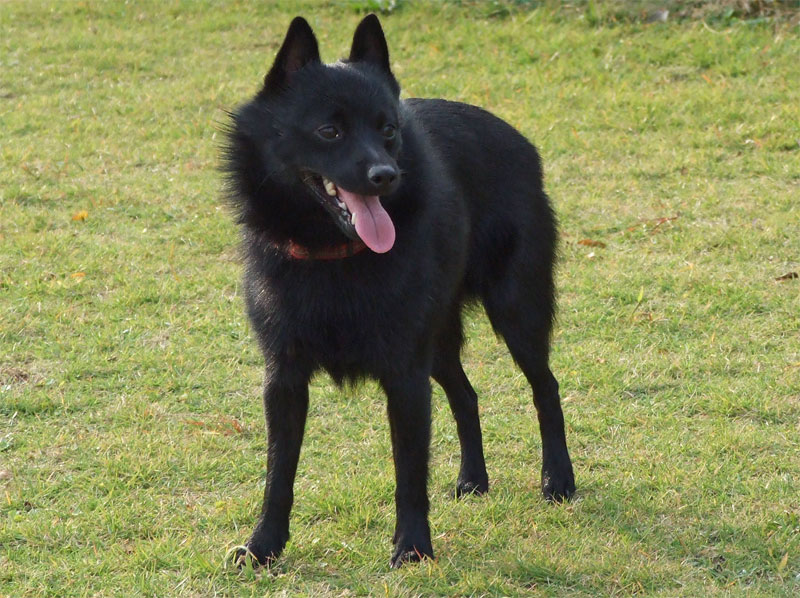
- Schipperke ready for action.
- Common nicknames: Spitzke (until 1888); Spits (until 1888); Spitske (until 1888); Little Black Devil (Belgium); Little Captain (Flemish)
- Origin: Belgium
Traits
Height	Males	33.6 cm (13.2 in) average
	Females	31.2 cm (12.3 in) average
- Weight: 3–9 kg (6.6–19.8 lb)
- Coat: Double, low shed
- Colour: Black (common) or Cream (rare) or Red/Liver (very rare)
- Litter size: 3–7
Kennel club standards
- Fédération Cynologique Internationale: standard
- Notes: Breed Family: Spitz The Institute of Canine Biology DNA study on the Schipperke found the dog to be in the Spitz line -- American Kennel Club, Schipperke breed info, Official AKC Standard of the Schipperke General Appearance Cutting off tails ("docking") is illegal in most of Europe. Cream and liver-colored Schipperkes may not currently participate in most shows.

A Schipperke (/ˈskɪpərkiː/; Dutch: [ˈsxɪpərkə]) is a small breed of dog that is believed to have originated in the 1600s in Flanders. In their home country of Belgium they are considered a small shepherd. DNA research has shown that Schipperkes have a close relationship to the Spitz family of dog breeds.

== Description ==
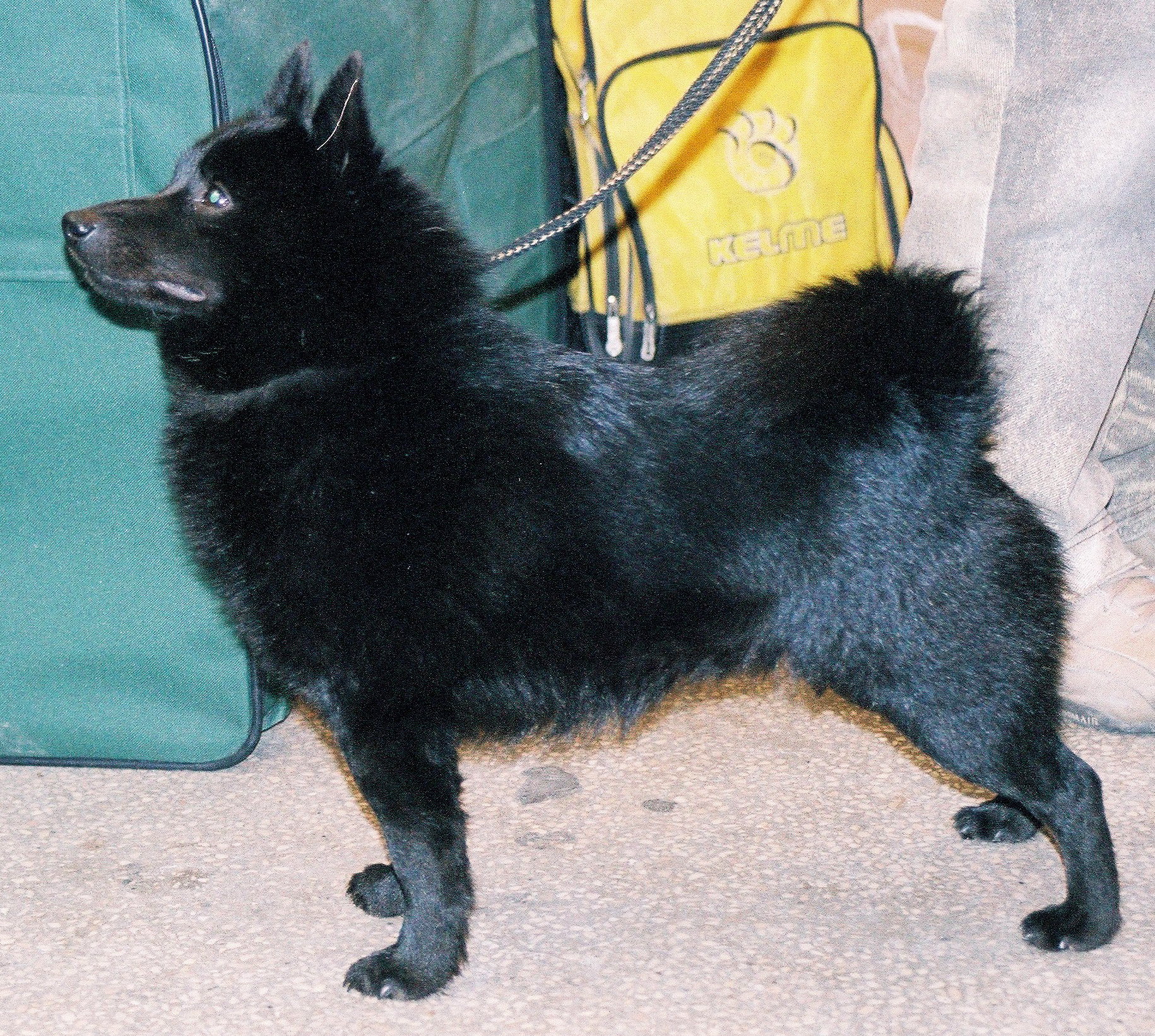
A Schipperke showing the ruff around the neck area

=== Physical ===
The Schipperke is a small, sturdy, usually black dog in the Spitz family. Their pointed ears are erect atop the head. Schipperkes are double coated with a soft, fluffy undercoat that is covered by a somewhat harsher-feeling and longer outer coat. One of the breed's characteristics is a long ruff that surrounds the neck and then a strip trails down towards the rear of the dog. They also have longer fur on their hind legs, called culottes. The breed is usually black, but sometimes blonde or cream-colored (some blondes have a silkier coat); very rarely they can have a liver-red coloration. The coat is shiny. Dogs of this breed usually weigh 3–9 kg (6.6–19.8 lb).

== Health ==
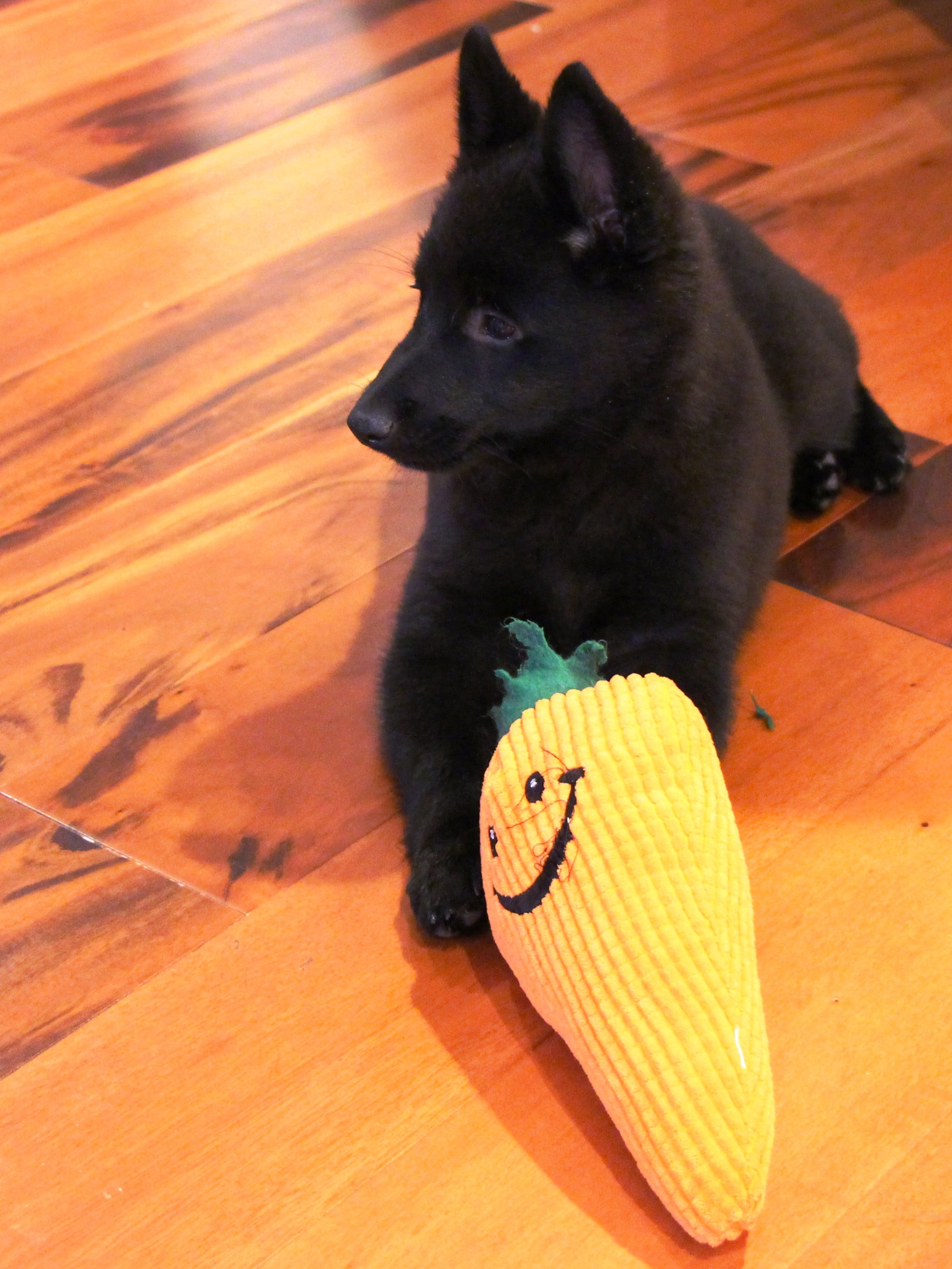
A 12-week-old female Schipperke puppy

The Schipperke has no particular health problems. The UK Kennel Club survey puts the median lifespan of the breed at 13 years old, with about 20% living to 15 years or more. Of the 36 deceased dogs in the survey, the oldest dog was 17 1/2 years old. There is a known case where a Schipperke lived to be 18 to 19 years old. Nonetheless, inactivity, lack of exercise, and over-feeding are very harmful, and can lead to joint and skeletal problems and tooth, heart, lung, or digestive conditions. Schipperkes' primary orthopedic problem tends to be luxating patella and Legg-Perthes syndrome (knee and hip disorders, respectively). Some Schipperkes have demonstrated tendencies to epilepsy, although there are no tests: these seem to be related to genetic transmission.

The one caveat to the Schipperke's good health is MPS IIIB, a genetic mutation that occurs in at most 15% of the total breed population. It only occurs in Schipperkes. The University of Pennsylvania School of Veterinary Medicine has developed a test for the disease and began accepting samples in April 2003. Clinical signs appear between two and four years of age, and there are no known cures or treatments. The disease affects balance, negotiation of obstacles (such as stairs), and is similar to such lysosomal storage diseases in humans as Tay–Sachs disease and Gaucher's disease. The Schipperke is also prone to some other physical problems as reported by the Orthopedic Foundation for Animals.

DNA research has shown that Schipperkes have a rising rate of inbreeding in their population.

== History ==
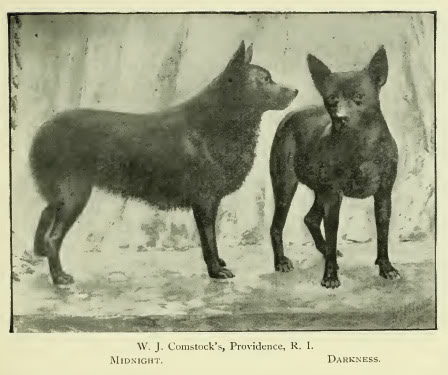
Schipperkes circa 1897

The earlier common references to Schipperkes suggest that they may have originated in the 1600s in Flanders. Schipperkes were first recognized as a formal breed in the 1880s, their standard being written in 1889. Much of what is known of their origins and early history comes from Chasse et Pêche (French for "Hunting and Fishing") magazine, articles from which were translated into English and published by the English magazine The Stockkeeper.

The breed name "Schipperke" means "little boatman" or "little captain" in the Flemish language. However while they were occasionally seen on barges it was not their original or primary function, and in the areas of Leuven and Brussels "scheper" (which sounds similar to "schipper"; a German Shepherd dog is known in Dutch as a "Duitse scheper") was the word for shepherd, making the name translate as "little shepherd".

Before the name "Schipperke" was officially taken, the breed was also known colloquially as "Spits" or "Spitzke", a name commonly used to describe a small dog with pointed ears. They were also occasionally called "Moorke", meaning "little black animal". Schipperkes are widely referred to in the United States, albeit erroneously, as "Belgian canal barge dogs" or "Belgian ship dogs." Apparently, however, their history dates to a seventeenth-century black shepherd dog commonly called the Leuvenaar, a 40-pound dog often found in the Louvain region of Belgium and employed to guard flocks and transport. These dogs are apparently the foundational breed for both the modern, and smaller, Schipperke and the modern, and larger, Black Belgian Shepherd Dog, also known as the Groenendael.

In World War II, the Belgian Resistance used the dogs to run messages between various resistance hideouts and cells, to which occupying Nazi forces were none the wiser.

== Genetic genealogy/DNA research ==
DNA laboratory studies have shown that the Schipperke is more closely related to the Pomeranian dog than the Belgian sheepdog and is very closely tied to Spitz type breeds. DNA studies also show a steady increase of inbreeding in Schipperkes.
