= Bobadil Hooper =

Australian rules footballer (1878–1928)

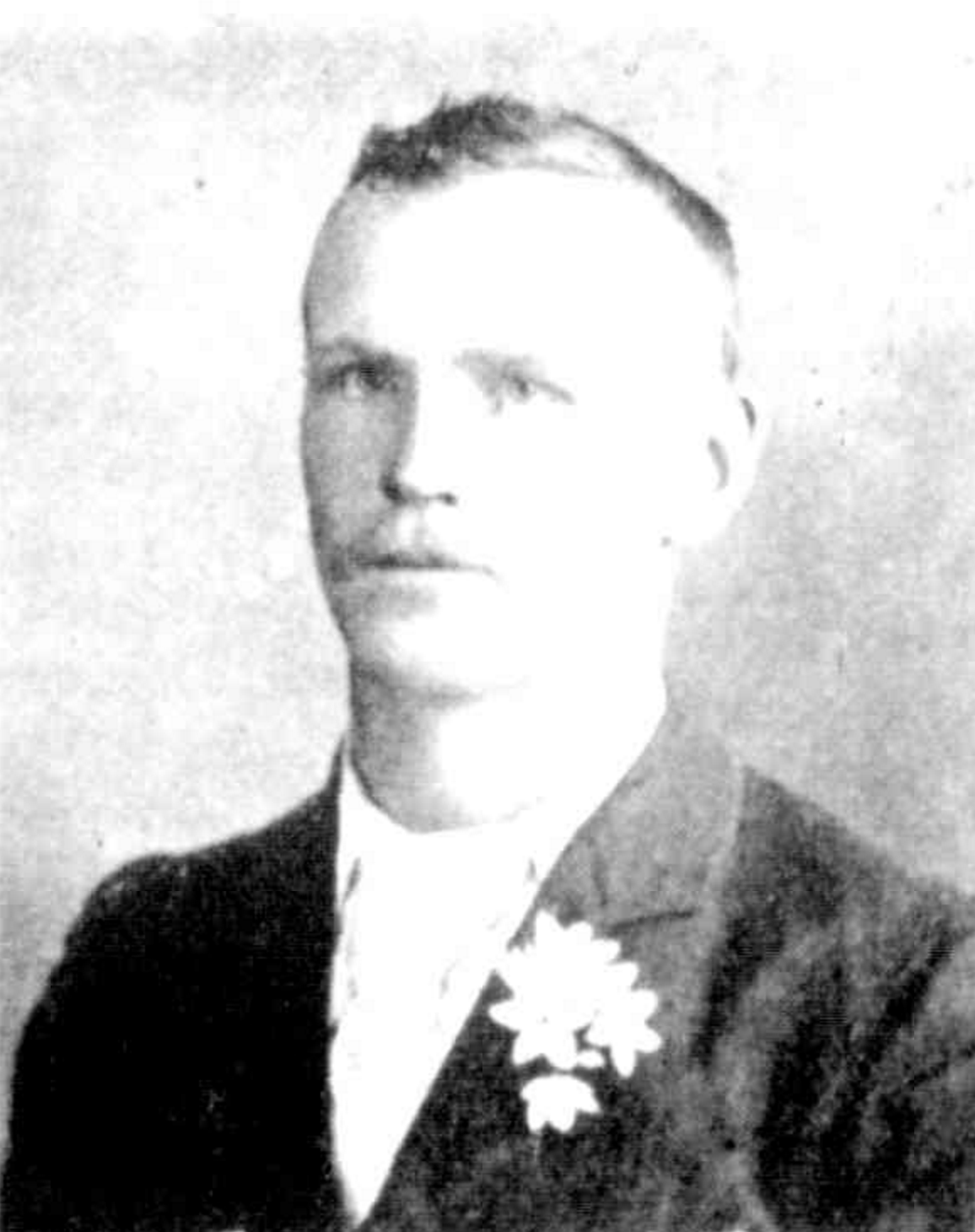
- Hooper in 1899

Personal information
- Full name: John William Hooper
- Nickname: Bobadil
- Born: 17 March 1878; Carlton, Victoria
- Died: 13 August 1928 (aged 50); Northcote, Victoria
- Original team: West Melbourne (VFA)

Playing career^{1}
Years	Club	Games (Goals)
1899	Carlton	15 (0)
- ^{1} Playing statistics correct to the end of 1899.

John William "Bobadil" Hooper (17 March 1878 – 13 August 1928) was an Australian rules footballer who played with Carlton in the Victorian Football League (VFL). He played 15 games with the Carlton team in 1899. His nickname is said to have come from a character in Ben Jonson's play Every Man in His Humour.
