= Arthur Kneller =

English cricketer

Personal information
- Full name: Arthur Harry Kneller
- Born: 28 April 1894; Kingsclere, Hampshire, England
- Died: 19 July 1969 (aged 75); Chichester, Sussex, England
- Batting: Right-handed

Domestic team information
- Years: Team
- 1924–1926: Hampshire

Career statistics
Competition	First-class
Matches	8
Runs scored	76
Batting average	8.44
100s/50s	0/0
Top score	25
Catches/stumpings	0/–
- Source: Cricinfo, 9 January 2009

Arthur Harry Kneller OBE (28 April 1894 — 19 July 1969) was an English first-class cricketer and colonial official in Kenya Colony.

== Cricket and colonial service ==
The son of Harry Kneller, he was born in April 1894 at Kingsclere, Hampshire. He was educated at Ardingly College, where he played for the college cricket team. Kneller served in the First World War, being commissioned into the Royal Garrison Artillery as a second lieutenant in June 1917. Shortly after the conclusion of the war, he was promoted to lieutenant in December 1918. He later played first-class cricket for Hampshire, making his debut against Sussex at Portsmouth in the 1924 County Championship. He played first-class cricket until 1926, making eight appearances. He scored 76 runs in his eight matches, at an average of 8.44 and a highest score of 25 not out.

Kneller joined the Colonial Office after playing first-class cricket, becoming a colonial official in Kenya Colony. He was appointed Inspector of Labour in December 1934 by Governor Sir Joseph Byrne, with him later being appointed a registration officer in June 1938. He was appointed a senior labour officer in February 1941, before being appointed Acting-Deputy Labour Commissioner in February 1948. He returned to his substantive rank of Principal Labour Officer in March 1948, but was reappointed Acting-Deputy Labour Commissioner in June of the same year. In July 1950, he was appointed be a Deputy Labour Commissioner, and was appointed as a Labour Commissioner in September of the following year, before reverting to his substantive post of Deputy Labour Commissioner in September 1952. He was appointed an OBE in the 1953 Coronation Honours. Kneller later took part in the investigation into mistreatment of Kenyan prisoners during the Mau Mau rebellion, at which point he was employed by the Kenya Wattle Manufacturers Association. Kneller later retired to England, where he died at Chichester in July 1969.
