= John DeBerniere Hooper =

American classicist

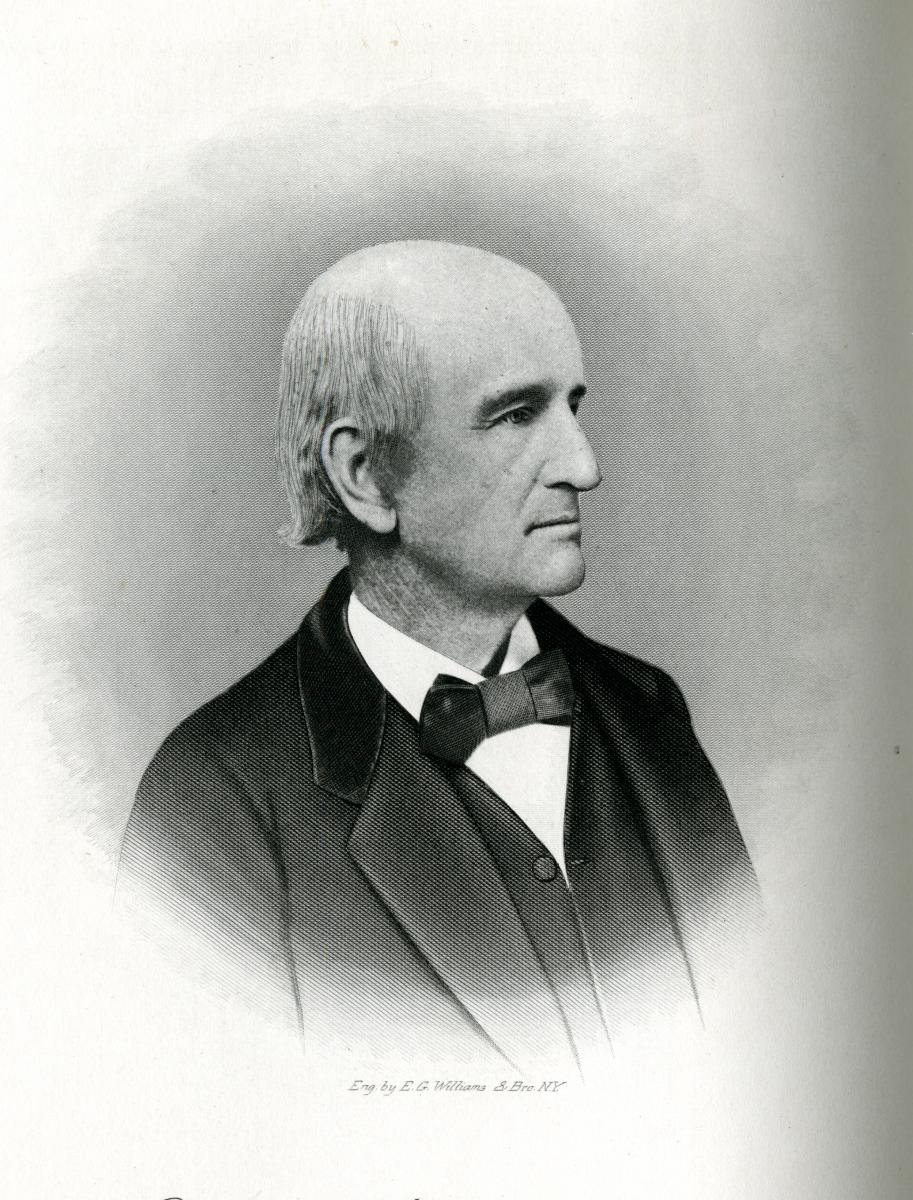
John DeBerniere Hooper (1811-1886), American educator and Classicist

John DeBerniere Hooper (born September 6, 1811, in Smithfield, North Carolina; died in Chapel Hill, North Carolina, January 23, 1886) was an American Classicist and was professor of Latin and French at the University of North Carolina at Chapel Hill until 1848.

Hooper was the son of Archibald Maclaine and Charlotte De Berniere Hooper. He was a descendant of William Hooper, who signed the Declaration of Independence.

Hooper's papers are archived in the libraries of the University of North Carolina at Chapel Hill.
