= Peter Piper (Royal Navy officer) =

Aston Dalzell Piper
- Born: 19 April 1913; Dovercourt, England
- Died: 8 November 1995 (aged 82); Exeter, England
- Military career
- Allegiance: United Kingdom
- Branch: Royal Naval Reserve
- Service years: 1932–1950; 1951–1966
- Rank: Captain
- Nickname: Peter
- Commands: HMS Sirdar (1945); HMS Tribune (1944–45); HMS Unsparing (1942–44); HMS H34 (1942)
- Conflicts: Second World War
- Awards: Distinguished Service Order; Distinguished Service Cross & Two Bars; Decoration for Officers of the Royal Naval Reserve

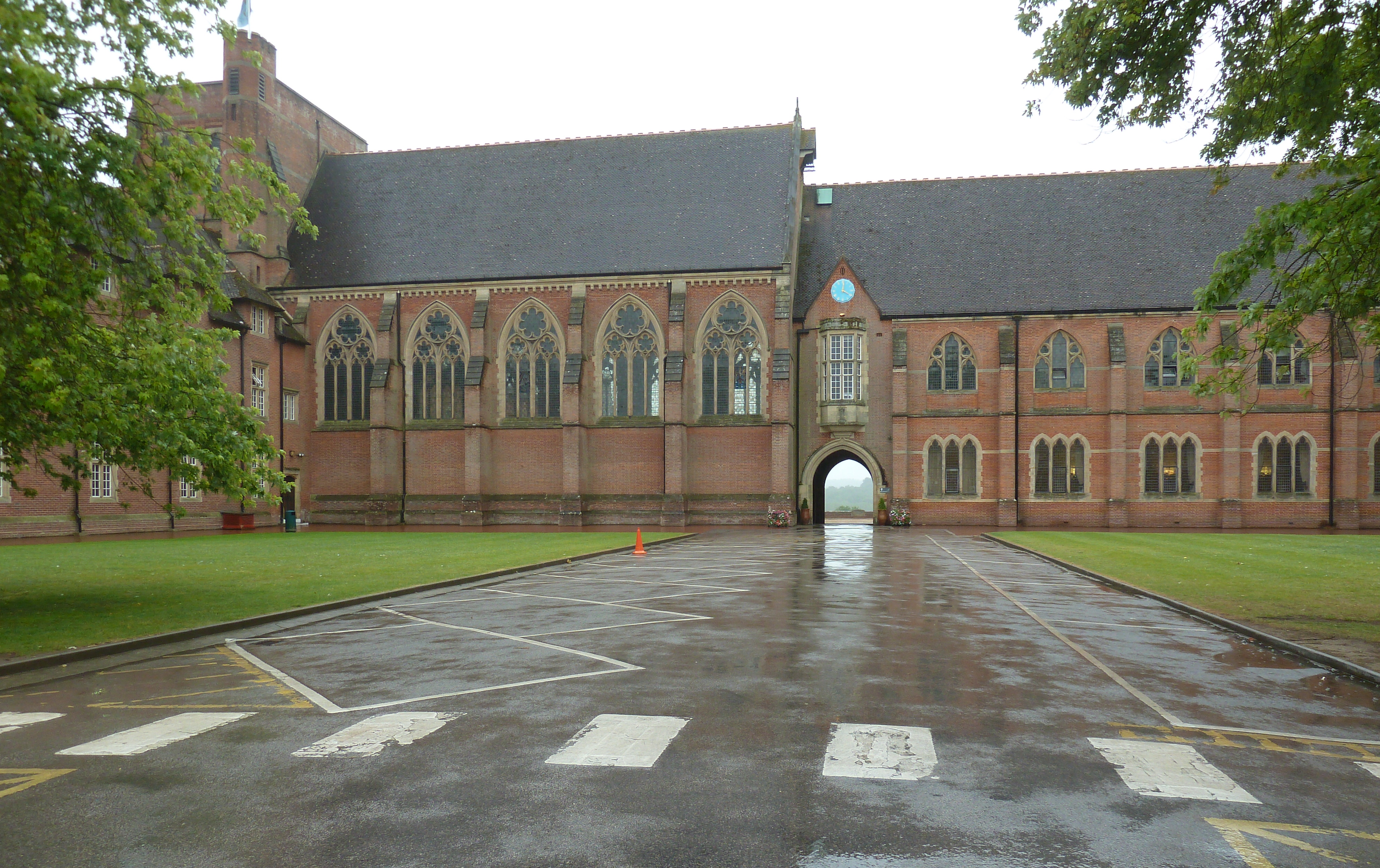
Ardingly College

Captain Aston Dalzell Piper, DSO, DSC & Two Bars, RD (19 April 1913 – 8 November 1995), known as Peter Piper, was an officer in the Royal Naval Reserve in the Second World War. He was notable for two events: he was the first reservist to command a submarine, and the first reservist officer to receive the Distinguished Service Cross in the Second World War.

== Early life and career ==
Piper was educated at Dovercourt High School, followed by Ardingly College. He spent three years in the Merchant Navy, mostly with the United Baltic Steamship Line. During his time in the Merchant Navy, he served on, amongst other ships, the SS Baltraffic as navigator. He joined the Royal Naval Reserve on 18 March 1932.

== Naval service ==
Piper started training for submarines in 1937, on HMS H49, in which he stayed until February 1938. On 8 November 1939, he was made navigating officer of HMS Ursula, before winning the Distinguished Service Cross (DSC) in December 1939. In 1941, he was promoted to first lieutenant on HMS Unbeaten. While aboard Unbeaten, he won two Bars to his DSC: one for "successful and aggressive patrols", and one for the sinking of U-374.

Piper then commanded HMS Upspring for fourteen patrols, sinking several ships and on one occasion scoring four hits with four torpedoes. For these patrols he was awarded the Distinguished Service Order.
