= John C. Hooper =

John C. Hooper (Jock; born 1945) is an American conservationist, forest manager, and organic farmer. He has been active in the preservation and restoration of forests, wilderness, and rivers for more than four decades. Hooper is a fifth generation San Franciscan.

== Early life ==
Hooper grew up in San Francisco until age 12 when his father was appointed U.S. Defense Representative to NATO. The family moved to Paris for the next dozen years. Hooper developed a lifelong interest in France as a result and has returned many times, including taking several long hikes on ancient pilgrimage trails (le Chemin de St Jacques de Compostelle).

=== Education ===
- Groton School, cum laude 1963;
- Harvard College, BA cum laude, 1968;
- Boston University, MA, international relations, 1971.

=== Military service ===
Hooper served in Germany as a lieutenant in the U.S. Army Adjutant General's Corps from 1968 to 1970.

== Career ==
After serving as a lieutenant in the U.S. Army adjutant General's Corps (1968–1970), Hooper owned and managed farms on Prince Edward Island, Canada. (1971–1976).

He returned to the U.S. to serve as press secretary and environmental aide to California Congressman Pete McCloskey (R) CA (1976–1977).

From 1978 to 1980 Hooper served as lobbyist for The Wilderness Society in Washington, D.C. He worked with Congressional staff on regulations implementing the National Forest Management Act of 1976, which reformed timber practices on public lands. He also advocated for federal wilderness legislation (RARE II) to protect federal roadless lands the Western U.S., including organizing Congressional hearings for several statewide bills.

In 1980 Hooper went to work for the national Sierra Club and moved back to his hometown of San Francisco. As Public Lands Representative and a registered lobbyist he continued to work on federal wilderness legislation and national forest management issues. During his five years with Sierra Club he helped to enact laws protecting millions of acres of wilderness lands in Colorado, New Mexico, and California.

From 1981-2000, as President as well as long-time board member of the Buena Vista Neighborhood Association, Hooper championed the restoration of historic Buena Vista Park in San Francisco. The 36-acre park, designed at the turn of the 20th century by John McLaren, creator of Golden Gate Park, had fallen into disrepair. Hooper was instrumental in developing a park master plan that was adopted by the San Francisco Department of Recreation and Parks, for which he received the Emily Prettyman Lowell Award from the San Francisco Friends of the Urban Forest.

In 1985 Hooper founded and operated Arbor & Espalier Company, a fruit tree nursery in Healdsburg, California that revived heirloom varieties of apples and pears in a partnership with Sonoma Antique Apple Nursery.

In 1989 Jock and his wife, Molly, acquired 330 acres on the Garcia River in Mendocino County and established Oz Farm, (12)(13) an organic apple farm they owned and managed until 2015. Oz Farm's apples were sold at farmers’ markets and grocery stores throughout the North Coast and Bay Area. Oz Farm became a well-known venue for weddings and other celebrations and served as a meeting place for environmental activists. The annual Harvest Festival at Oz Farm raised thousands of dollars for local nonprofits, including the Coast Community Library, Friends of the Garcia River, and the Arena Theater. The Farm-to-Table Dinners at Oz Farm, featuring leading chefs, helped Point Arena's historic movie theater to keep its doors open.

Hooper has been a long term Board member of Friends of the Garcia River (FROG) and a driving force to restore the salmon and steelhead fishery in that coastal river. In 2011 Hooper was the lead plaintiff in a lawsuit (Sierra Club v CALFIRE) that successfully challenged an aggressive logging plan for old-growth redwoods and Douglas fir at the Bohemian Grove, a 2,700-acre enclave on the Russian River owned by the elite San Francisco Bohemian Club. The lawsuit gained national attention.

Hooper is a founder and currently spokesperson for Protect Our Water, a Bay Area citizens’ group concerned about the environmental and economic impacts of the state of California's proposed Twin Tunnels, a large water diversion project from the Sacramento-San Joaquin Delta to southern California.

=== Service and Board positions ===
From 2014 to 2018, Hooper served as a Trustee of the National Tropical Botanical Garden (NTBG), which is dedicated to preserving tropical plant diversity and stemming the tide of plant extinctions. Its botanical gardens are located in Hawaii and Florida. The NTBG's Hawaii-based Breadfruit Institute, which Hooper chaired, promotes the conservation and use of breadfruit for food and reforestation. The institute is documenting traditional uses and cultural practices associated with this important food source, and developing partnerships to make breadfruit varieties a sustainable resource for agriculture, agroforestry, and reforestation.

Hooper is a founding member of the Board of the California Tahoe Conservancy. Appointed in 1985 by the Speaker of the California State Assembly as the Board's public member, Hooper served as Vice-Chair for 32 years until 2017. The agency is charged with protecting and restoring Lake Tahoe.

Hooper also was a founding Board member of the Tahoe-Baikal Institute in 1991. Dedicated to scientific research, the institute organizes international student exchanges to study the unique, largely pristine Siberian lake. Hooper participated in the California Resources agency's delegation to Lake Baikal in 1990.

Since 1990, Hooper has served on the Board of Directors of Friends of the Garcia River (FROG), a grassroots advocacy group dedicated to restoring the Garcia River and its endangered steelhead and Coho salmon.

From 2000 to 2004 Hooper was appointed by Mayor Willie Brown to serve on the San Francisco-Paris Sister City Committee. He organized tree plantings in the Bois de Boulogne to help repair damage from a major storm there in 1999.

Hooper currently serves on the Advisory Board of the Conservation Fund's 23,000-acre Garcia River Forest Project, co-managed with The Nature Conservancy.

In addition, Hooper served on the following Boards of Directors:

- Sierra Club Foundation
- San Francisco Conservation Corps
- Friends of the Urban Forest
- San Francisco Parks Trust (now San Francisco Parks Alliance)
- Buena Vista Neighborhood Association

== Personal life ==
During the 1990s Hooper produced several musical shows for the theater company, The Vocal Minority, raising money for San Francisco parks, museums, and the San Francisco Main Library. Hooper occasionally sings with a Point Arena-based band. In 2015 he released a CD called Bathtub Ballads and Roadtrip Blues.

=== Family ===
Hooper is a fifth generation San Franciscan. Parents: John A. Hooper (1917-2007) and Patricia L. Hooper (1922-2010), both of Woodside, California. Wife: Molly Bolton (1949). Children: Nate (1980), Hannah (1982), and Rachel (1985). Granddaughter, Willa Payne Zucconi (2015).

== Publications ==
Conservationist’s Guide to National Forest Planning. Sierra Club, May 1981. Saving the Solitude: A Guide to the BLM Wilderness Study Process, Sierra Club, 1983. Privatization: The Reagan Administration's Master Plan for Government Giveaway, Sierra Magazine November/December 1982.

== Awards ==
Emily Prettyman Lowell Award from the San Francisco Friends of the Urban Forest, 1991
