= Ardingly College =

Public school in Ardingly near Haywards Heath, West Sussex, England

Coordinates: 51°02′26″N 00°05′23″W

Ardingly College St. Saviours's College at Ardingly

Location
- College Road; Ardingly, West Sussex; England

Information
- Type: Public school Private boarding and day school
- Motto: Latin: Beati mundo corde (Blessed are the pure in heart)
- Religious affiliation: Church of England
- Established: 1858
- Founder: Nathaniel Woodard
- Chairman of Governors: Robert Haynes Brown
- Head Master: Alastair Tighe
- Provost: Jonathan Meyrick
- Gender: Coeducational
- Age: 13 to 18
- Enrolment: 416
- Houses: 8
- Colours: Ardingly green, brown & mellow^{a}
- Publication: Old Ardinian; Ardingly Journal; Ardingly Annals; Logos; Wonderful Bird; Scientia
- Alumni: Old Ardinians
- Visitor: The Bishop of Chichester ex officio
- Affiliation: Woodard Corporation
- Website: www.ardingly.com

Ardingly College (/ˈɑːrdɪŋlaɪ/) is a fee-charging boarding and day school in the English public school tradition located near Ardingly, West Sussex, England. The school is a member of the Headmasters' and Headmistresses' Conference and of the Woodard Corporation of independent schools and as such has a strong Anglo-Catholic tradition. It was originally a boarding school for boys, and became fully co-educational in 1982.

Ardingly played an important role in providing infantry throughout the 20th century conflicts, with around 1,200 Ardingly pupils going on to fight in the First World War, 146 of whom were killed, along with two former members of staff. In addition, 88 Old Ardinians died in World War II; their names being recorded in a book of remembrance.

The school's former pupils – or "Old Ardinians" – include four Conservative MPs; satirist Ian Hislop; actor Terry-Thomas; Formula One World Champion Mike Hawthorn; author Neil Gaiman; Interscan inventor John Paul Wild; and Allard Motor Company founder Sydney Allard.

== History ==
Ardingly College was founded as "St Saviour’s College", Shoreham, in 1858 by Canon Nathaniel Woodard whose aim was to provide education firmly grounded in the Christian faith.

St Saviour's College opened on 12 April 1858, occupying the New Shoreham buildings in the lee of the churchyard of St Mary de Haura which had been vacated by another Woodard School, Lancing College, when it moved to its permanent home in April 1858. The site at Shoreham however was never intended to be permanent and it was left to Woodard to scour the South of England for a suitable permanent location for St Saviour's School.

In 1861 Woodard came across the 196 acre (0.79 km²) Saucelands estate at the southern edge of Ardingly village, which was acquired in 1862 for £6,000. Woodard employed Richard Carpenter as the school's architect, and the foundation stone at Ardingly was laid on 12 July 1864 by Granville Leveson-Gower, 2nd Earl Granville. St Saviour's College moved to the partially completed site at Ardingly on 14 June 1870 when the new school was officially opened by the Bishop of Chichester, with the inaugural sermon delivered by Samuel Wilberforce.

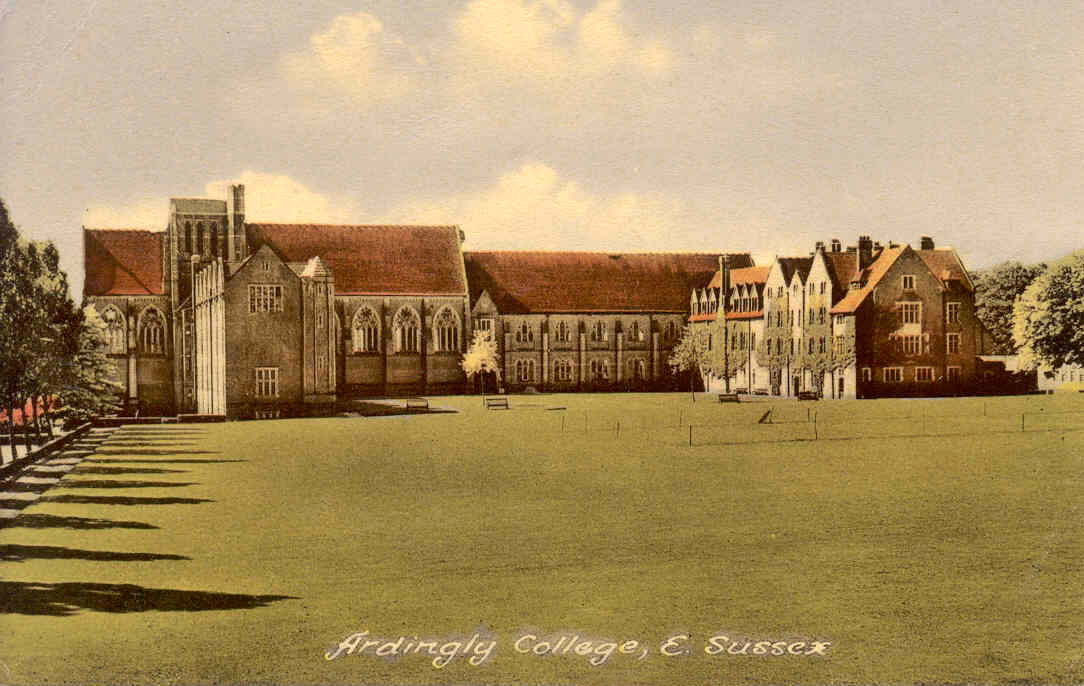
1909 postcard of the 'Main Schools'

Today Ardingly occupies a 420-acre (1.7 km²) site situated in an Area of Outstanding Natural Beauty. Ardingly is divided into three autonomous schools, comprising a Pre-Preparatory School catering for pupils aged 2½ –7, Junior School catering for pupils aged 7–13 and Senior School for pupils aged 13–18. Both Junior and Senior Schools accommodate boarders who make up the majority of the Senior School student population. All Junior and Senior School students are assigned to a boarding house in which boarders live and study and where day-pupils have study areas.

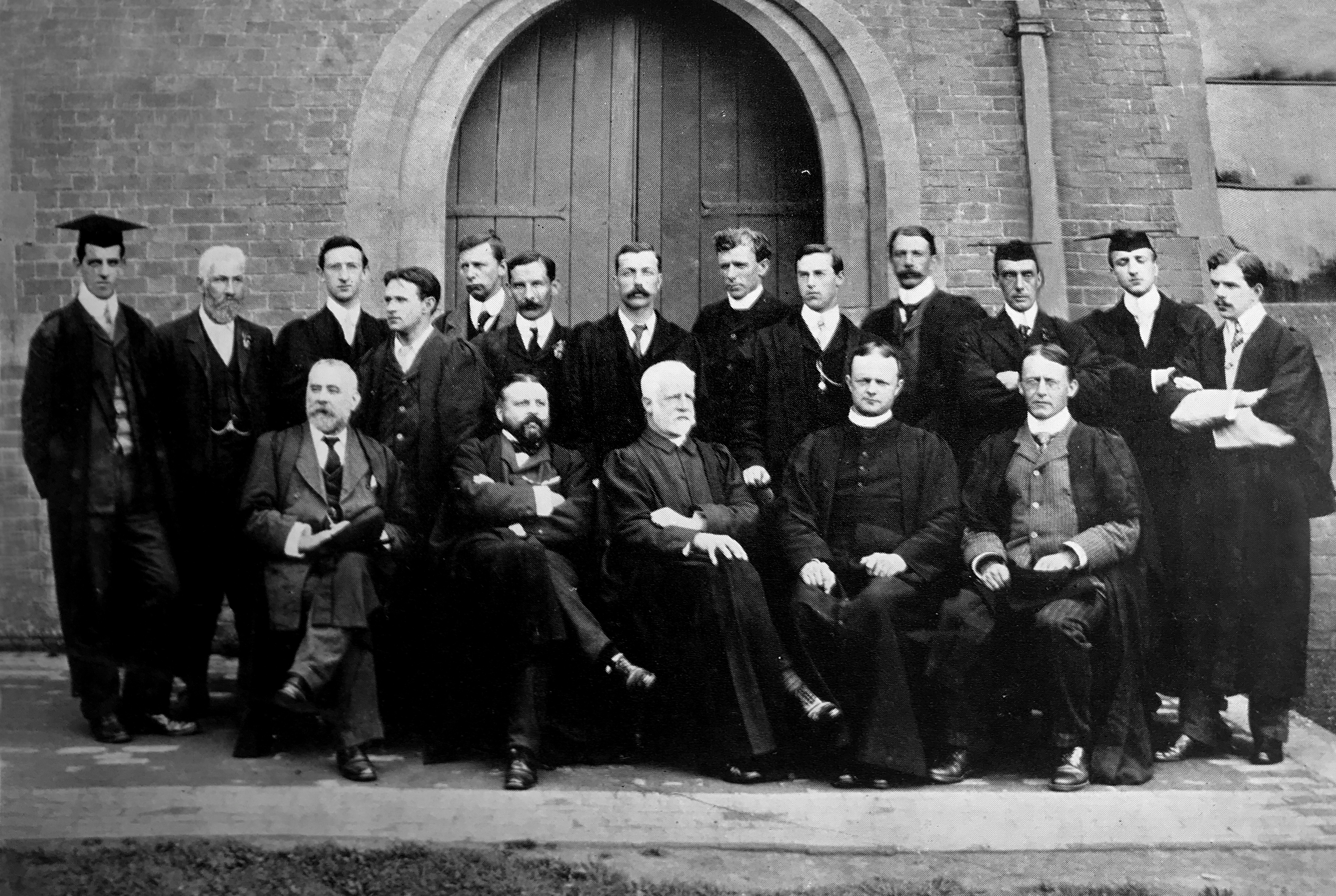
Masters of Ardingly in 1904

The college's Combined Cadet Force was established in 1902 in the wake of the Second Boer War. Around 1,200 Old Ardinians went on to fight in the First World War, 146 of whom were killed, along with two former members of staff; their names are recorded on the war memorial in the college chapel. In addition, 88 Old Ardinians died in the Second World War; their names are recorded in a book of remembrance in the crypt and on the memorial board in the Under.

In 1958, the school celebrated its centenary. On 9 June 1958, as part of the celebrations, the Queen and the Duke of Edinburgh visited Ardingly. A stone plaque on the terrace parapet commemorates the visit, where she "beheld the view". Later that week, on 14 June 1958, the then Prime Minister, Harold Macmillan, visited the school to open the Centenary Building, which comprises the college cricket pavilion and upstairs Centenary Room. On 8 May 2008, the Duke of Kent visited Ardingly as part of its sesquicentenary celebrations and officially opened a new teaching block at the pre-preparatory school. According to a Freedom of Information Request the school withdrew from the Teacher’s Pension Scheme on 31 December 2020.

== School terms ==
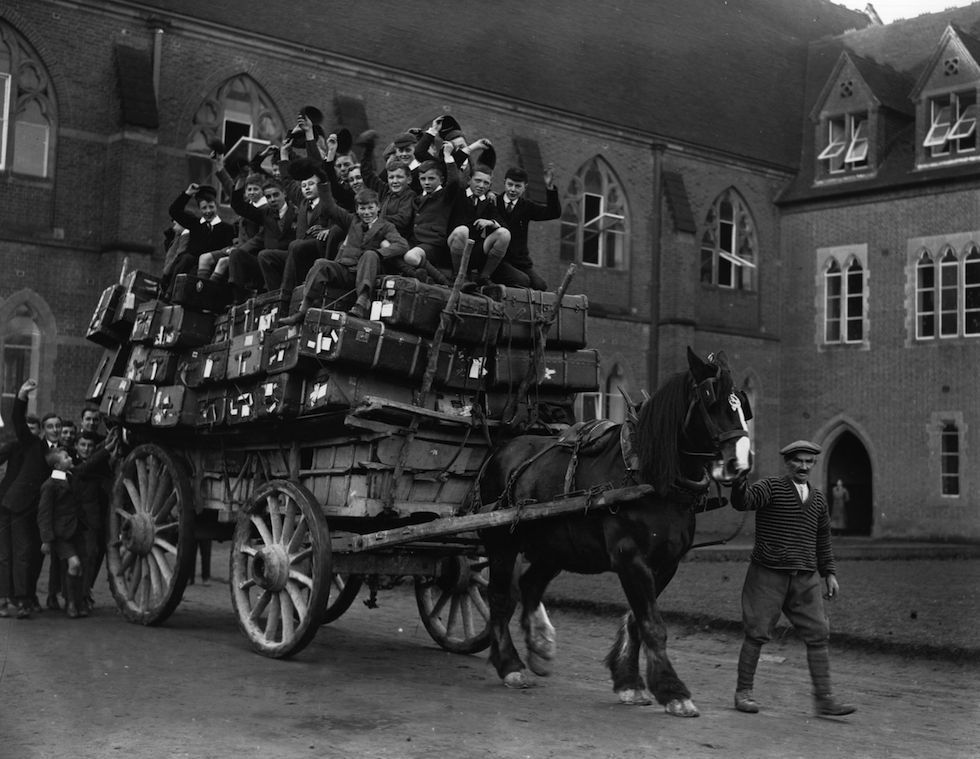
Boys about to depart for the Michaelmas break at Ardingly in the early 1900s

There are three academic terms in the year:

- The Michaelmas term, from early September to mid December. New pupils are now admitted only at the start of the Michaelmas Half, unless in exceptional circumstances.
- The Lent term, from mid-January to late March.
- The Trinity term, from late April to late June or early July.

Similarly, there are five academic years:

- "Shell", pupils in their first year at Ardingly (year 9).
- "Remove", pupils in their second year at Ardingly (year 10).
- "Fifth", pupils in their third year at Ardingly (year 11).
- "Lower Sixth", pupils in their fourth year at Ardingly (year 12) which start studying for their A levels or IB.
- "Upper Sixth", pupils in their fifth and last year at Ardingly (year 13).

== Chapel of St Saviour ==
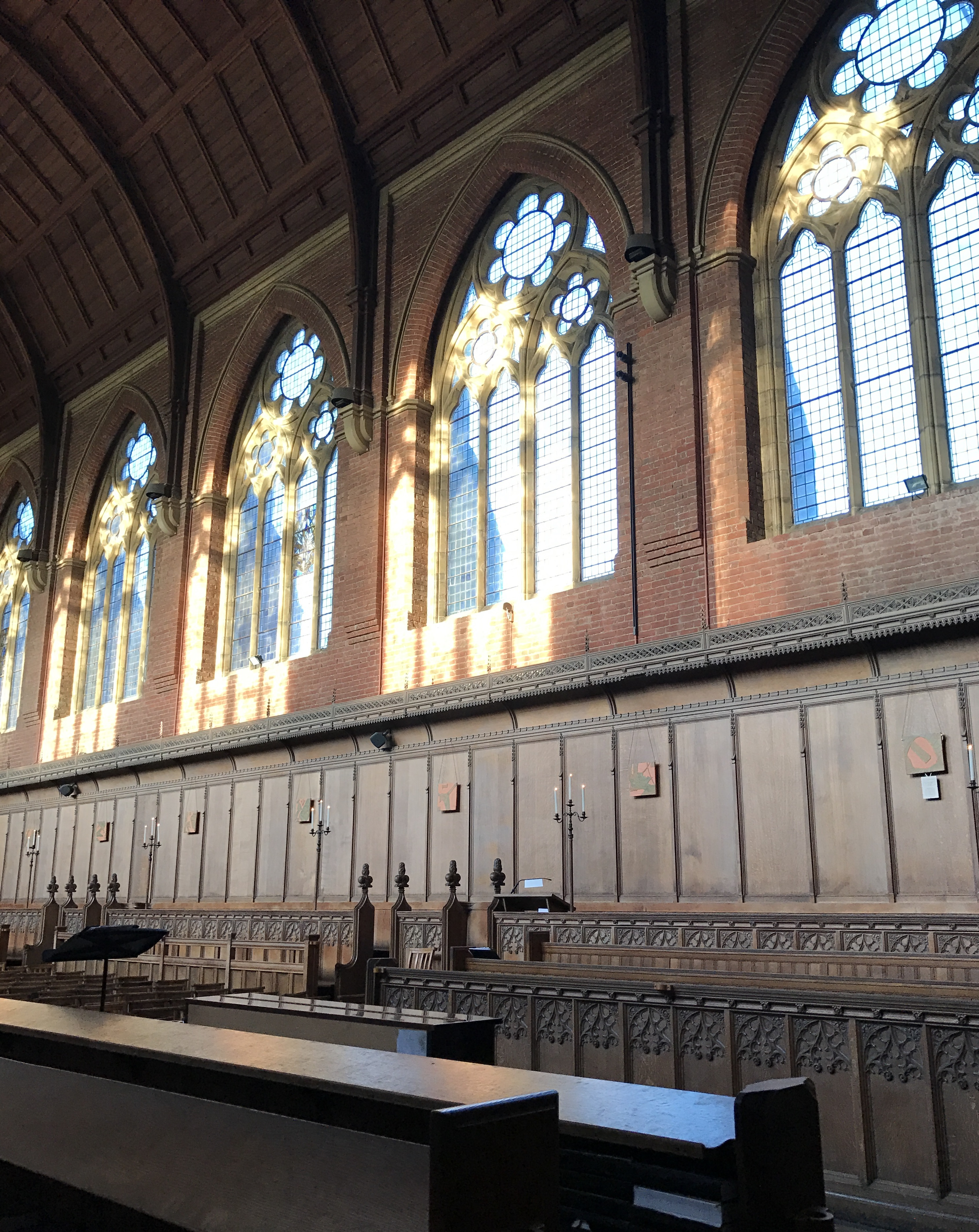
Detail of the stained glass windows at the Chapel of St Saviour

The Grade II listed chapel bears the historical name of the school, being laid the foundation stone 12 July 1864. The architects were R. H. Carpenter and William Slater. The structures are in Gothic Revival style in red brick and tiled rooftops. The chapel possesses the east end of the mid block, having four bays each containing a glass-stained window of Decorated sort. It stretches out into a further two narrows east of the west wing. Over the rooftop there is a bell tower.

In 1976, cartoonist Nick Newman was expelled from Ardingly in his last term of Upper Sixth for wiring the Chapel to play rock music during a school Mass.

== Headmasters ==
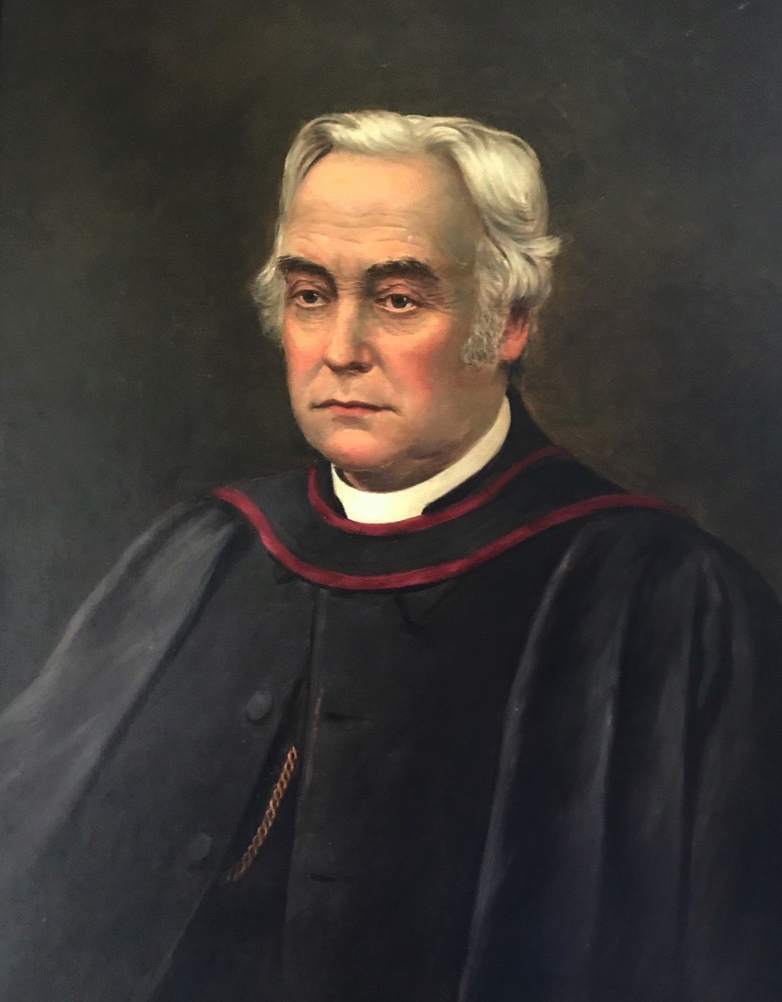
Frederick Mertens, Ardingly's first headmaster

- 1858–1894 Frederick Mertens
- 1894–1904 Francis Hilton
- 1904–1911 Herbert Rhodes
- 1911–1914 Marchant Pearson
- 1915–1932 Thomas Wilson
- 1933–1946 Ernest Crosse
- 1947–1961 George Snow
- 1962–1980 Christopher Bulteel
- 1980–1998 James Flecker
- 1998–2007 John Franklin
- 2007–2014 Peter Green
- 2014–2026 Ben Figgis
- 2026–present: Alastair Tighe

== Ardingly College Lodge ==
The school has its own Masonic lodge, Ardingly College Lodge, which is a member of the Public School Lodges council. The lodge, which is open to male Old Ardinians as well as those with an affiliation to the college, was founded in 1922 by the then headmaster, Thomas Erskine Wilson, together with masters, the Provost of the school and the Bishop of Lewes.

Freemasonry at Ardingly takes its form from the Enlightenment in England during the 18th century, and shares characteristics with charitable organizations. It provides a common meeting place for Old Ardinian men with similar interests.

== Combined Cadet Force ==
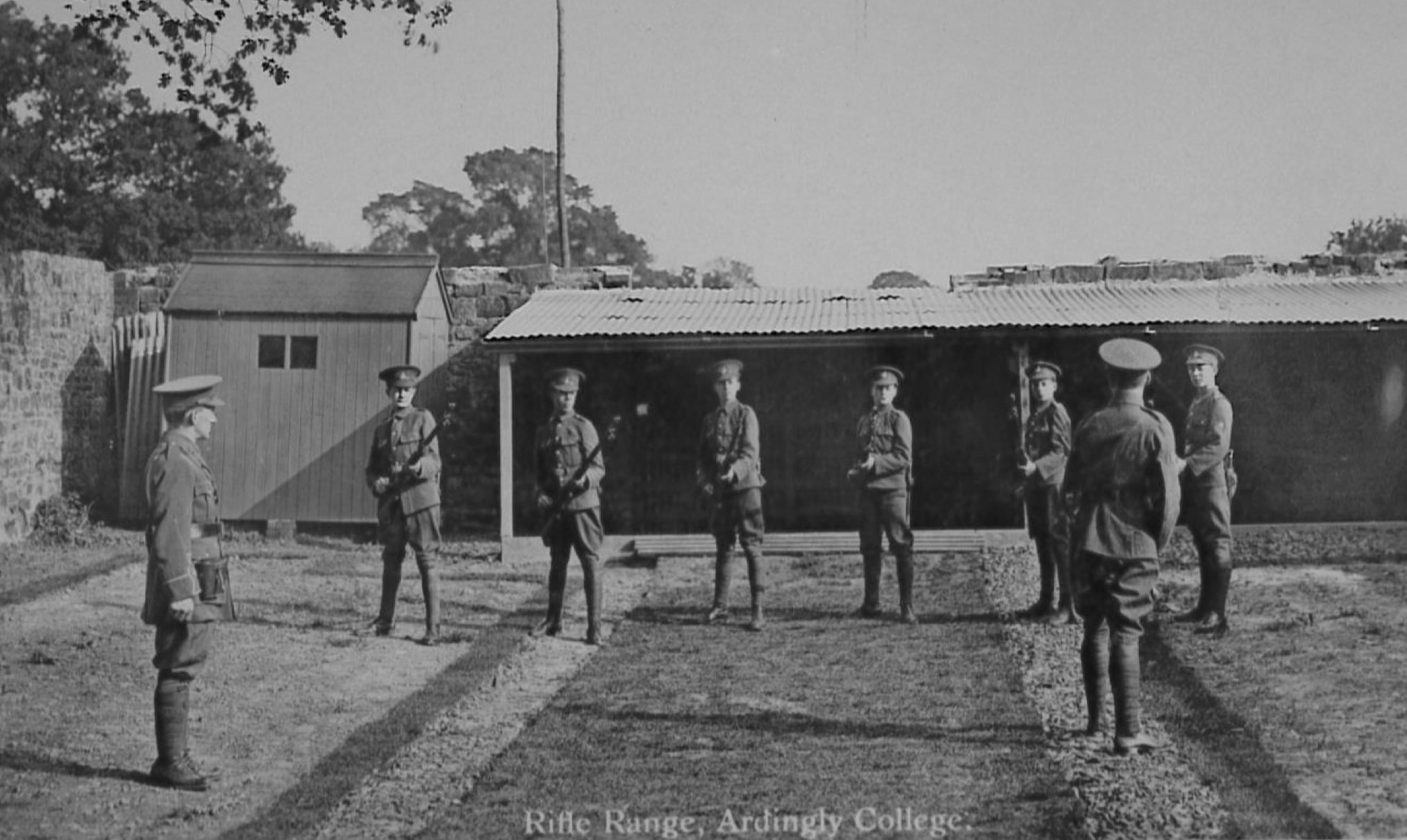
Cadet boys of Ardingly at one of the school's rifle range's in 1919

The Ardingly College Combined Cadet Force, or CCF, has existed in its various forms since 1902, with the outbreak of the Second Boer War. The Ardingly College CCF is split into six categories. These are Army, Royal Navy, Royal Air Force, Royal Marines, Drum Corps and Marching Band. The Army section is affiliated to the Princess of Wales's Royal Regiment, allowing cadets to take part in military and adventure training not readily available to non-cadets.

== Ardingly Solar Car ==
Ardingly takes part in the World Solar Challenge, a biennial solar-powered car race in Australia. The school's students worked in the project for three years, achieving to complete the race 23 October 2015.

The current patron of Ardingly Solar is Prince Albert II.

== Fees ==
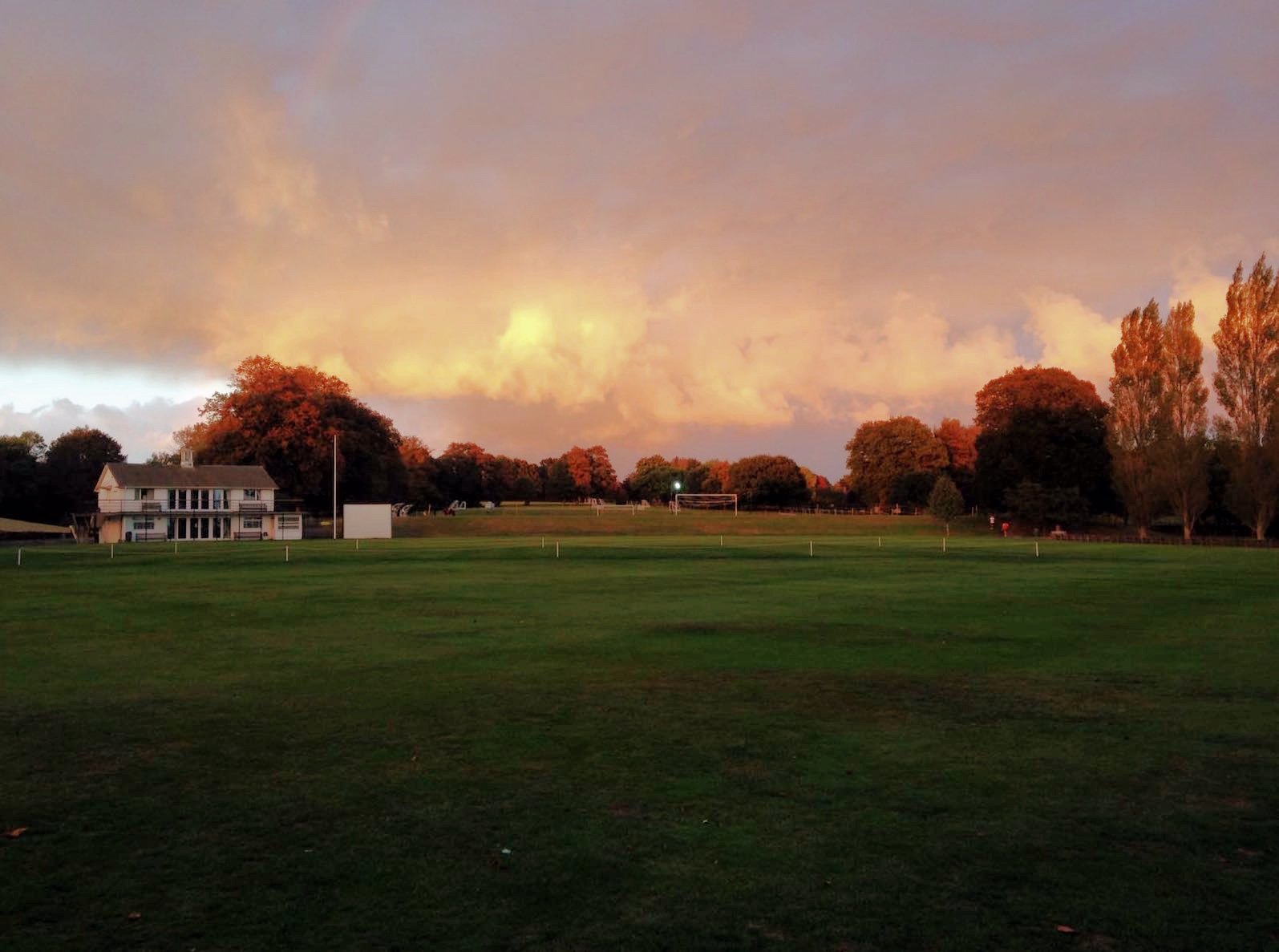
Ardingly cricket pitch and pavilion

As of the academic year 2024/25, Shell–5th boarding fees are £44,775 per annum while Shell–5th day fees are £29,463 per annum. Sixth form boarding fees are £46,422 per annum, while Sixth form day fees are £30,318 per annum.

== Media coverage ==
The school was featured in the second episode of the BBC series Stiff Upper Lip: An emotional History of Britain, where the protagonist Ian Hislop returns to Ardingly, his former school, to describe his experiences there as well as the impact of the British public school system in shaping men in Victorian era.

== Dinosaur findings ==
In February 2014, the BBC confirmed that several fossils had been discovered at the school grounds. The remains were found by staff and pupils during the construction of a new boarding house for girls. According to the Natural History Museum and Imperial College in London, some of these bones were around 140 million years old.

== Notable alumni ==
Notable former pupils include four former Conservative MPs, Private Eye editor Ian Hislop, actor Terry-Thomas, author Neil Gaiman, band leader Victor Silvester, Formula One World Champion Mike Hawthorn, and Crufts dog show founder Charles Cruft.

Fictional Old Ardinians include Tim Nice-But-Dim from The Nearly Complete and Utter History of Everything.

Making a Splash: Ardinians running the school's renowned Steeplechase in 1935

== Southern Railway V Schools class ==
The school lent its name to the eighteenth steam locomotive (Engine 917) in the Southern Railway's Class V of which there were 40. This class was also known as the Schools Class because all 40 of the class were named after prominent English public schools. Ardingly, as it was called, was built in 1934 and withdrawn in 1962.

== See also ==
- List of SR V "Schools" class locomotives
