= Schnauzer =

Dog breed type

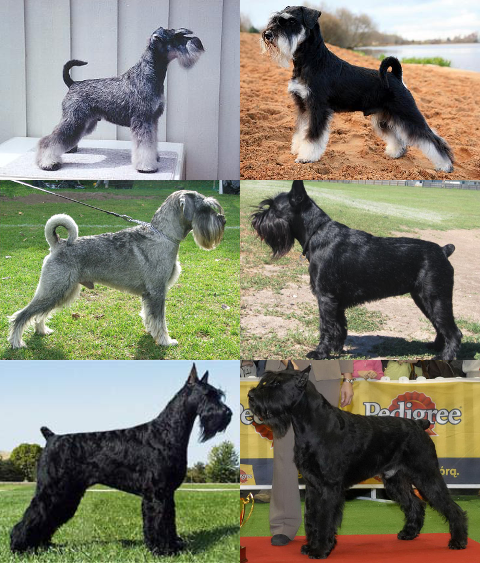
Schnauzer types: Miniature, Standard and Giant (top to bottom)

The Schnauzer (/ˈʃnaʊzər, ˈʃnaʊtsər/ SHNOW-zər, SHNOWT-sər, German: [ˈʃnaʊtsɐ]; plural Schnauzer, German: [ˈʃnaʊ̯t͡sɐ]; lit. 'snouter') is a dog breed type that originated in Germany in the 14th to 16th centuries. The term comes from the German word for "snout" and means colloquially "moustache", or "whiskered snout", because of the dog's distinctively bearded snout. Initially called the Wire-Haired Pinscher, the name Schnauzer was adopted in 1879.

== Breeds ==
There are three breeds: the Standard, the Giant, and the Miniature. Toy and teacup are not breeds of Schnauzer, but these common terms are used to market undersized or ill-bred Miniature Schnauzers. The original Schnauzer was of the same size as the modern Standard Schnauzer breed and was bred as a rat-catcher and guard dog. The Giant Schnauzer and the Miniature Schnauzer were developed from the Standard Schnauzer and are the result of outcrosses with other breeds exhibiting the desirable characteristics needed for the Schnauzer's original purpose. By the VDH and FCI Schnauzer is placed in "Group 2, Section 1: Pinschers and Schnauzers", with "Nr. 181, 182 and 183" in "Section 1.2: Schnauzer" dedicated to all three Schnauzer breeds.

- Standard Schnauzers (also known as Mittelschnauzers) are around 1.5 ft (46 cm) tall at the shoulder and weigh 30 to 45 lb (14 to 20 kg). They are in the group of working dogs, bred as multifunctional dogs to catch rats and other rodents, as livestock and guard dogs, and later they have also carried messages in times of war, helped the Red Cross and been police dogs. It is considered to have a common ancestry with the German Pinscher as a wire-haired coated variant of the Pinscher breed, and was possibly crossed with black German Poodle and gray Wolfspitz, to which influence is attributed the black soft coat and the salt-and-pepper gray wiry coat.
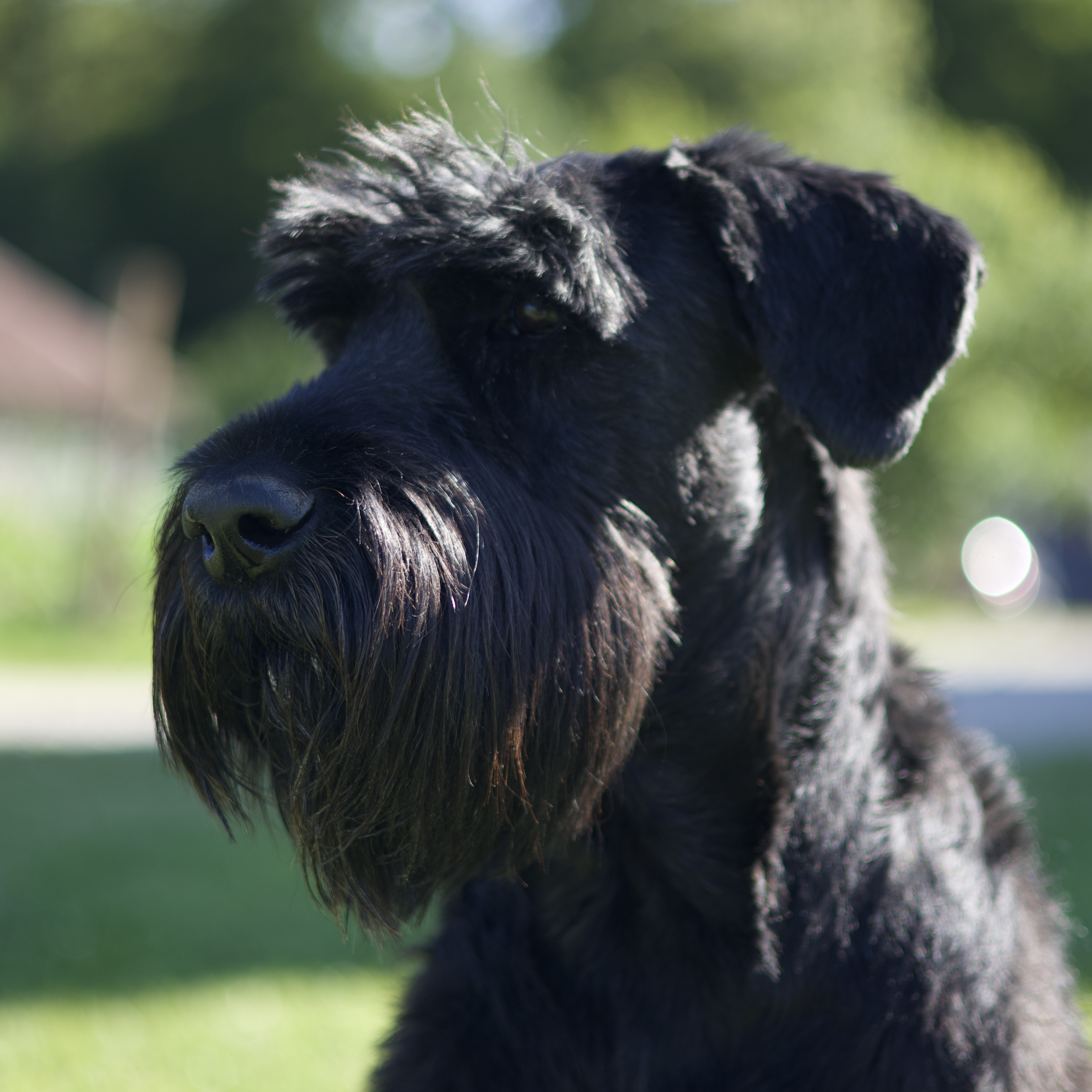
- Giant Schnauzer
  Giant Schnauzers (also known as Riesenschnauzers) are around 2 ft (61 cm) tall at the shoulder and weigh between 55 and 80 lb (25 and 36 kg). They are working dogs that were developed in Swabia in the 17th century, once known as the Munich Schnauzer, originally bred to drive livestock to market and guard farms, and later used as police and military dogs. Cynologists believe that the Giant Schnauzer was developed independently through crosses of black Great Danes, Munchener German Shepherds, Rottweilers, Dobermans, Boxers, Bouvier des Flandres, Thuringian Shepherds, and the Standard Schnauzer.
- Miniature Schnauzers (also known as Zwergschnauzers) are around 1 ft (30 cm) tall at the shoulder and weigh between 14 and 20 lb (6.4 and 9.1 kg). They were developed from the late 19th century. Cynologists consider that the Miniature Schnauzer is the result of crossing the original Standard Schnauzer with a smaller breed like the Affenpinscher, and Miniature Poodle. The Miniature Schnauzer is classified as a utility (UK, Australia, New Zealand) or terrier group (U.S., Canada), however, they are not related to the terrier group as do not have the typical terrier temperament, coat, shape of head and body. The American Kennel Club (AKC) approves salt-and-pepper gray, black, and black and silver as acceptable coat colors for a Miniature Schnauzer. They are also bred in pure white or even parti-colored, but neither is approved by the AKC. In 2004, the Miniature Schnauzer accounted for 2.4% of purebred dogs registered by the AKC.

== Genetics ==
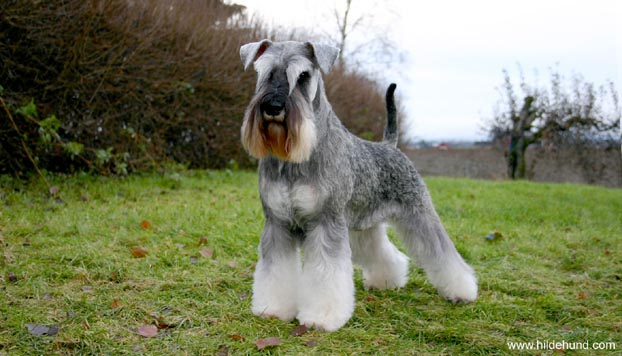
A salt-and-pepper Miniature Schnauzer with intact ears and tail

In a 2004, population genetics study of 85 purebred dogs, which used cluster-based methods with four identified genetic clusters, all three Schnauzer breeds structurally mostly clustered within "recent European descent, largely terriers and hounds" cluster, with a smaller percent within "working breeds" and "mastiff-type breeds" clusters, while the "Asian breeds/ancient hounds and spitz-type breed" cluster was present among Giant Schnauzers. In a 2007 Collie eye anomaly study of 638 dogs from 132 distinct breeds, with five specimens of each Schnauzer breed size, in the population structure of the microsatellite analysis they mostly clustered in the "hunting group" rather than the "mastiff/terrier group". In a 2010 GWAS study using more than 48,000 single-nucleotide polymorphisms of 915 dogs from 85 breeds, Standard and Giant Schnauzers made a separate phylogenetic tree branch clustered among "modern" breeds (e.g., "working dogs"), and not the "small terrier"/"mastiff-terrier" cluster, sharing genetic closeness with the Doberman Pinscher, the German Shepherd Dog and the Portuguese Water Dog.

In the most recent 2017 WGS study of 1,346 dogs from 161 breeds, Standard and Miniature Schnauzers made one separate phylogenetic clade of 23 clades and formed a unique broader clade in which they share common ancestry with spitz-type breeds such as the American Eskimo Dog, the Pomeranian and the Volpino Italiano, as well as the Schipperke, the Papillon, the Brussels Griffon and the Pug. Although the Giant Schnauzer shares a haplotype with the other two Schnauzer breeds, it made a phylogentic node in a separate clade, sharing common ancestry with the Black Russian Terrier, the Rottweiler and the Doberman Pinscher. In another 2017 WGS study researching the genetic variants for the development of short tails among dog breeds, the sampled (Miniature) Schnauzer and Rottweiler have "short tail phenotype caused by the unknown genetic factors" and "are predicted to have developed short tail independently".

== Description ==
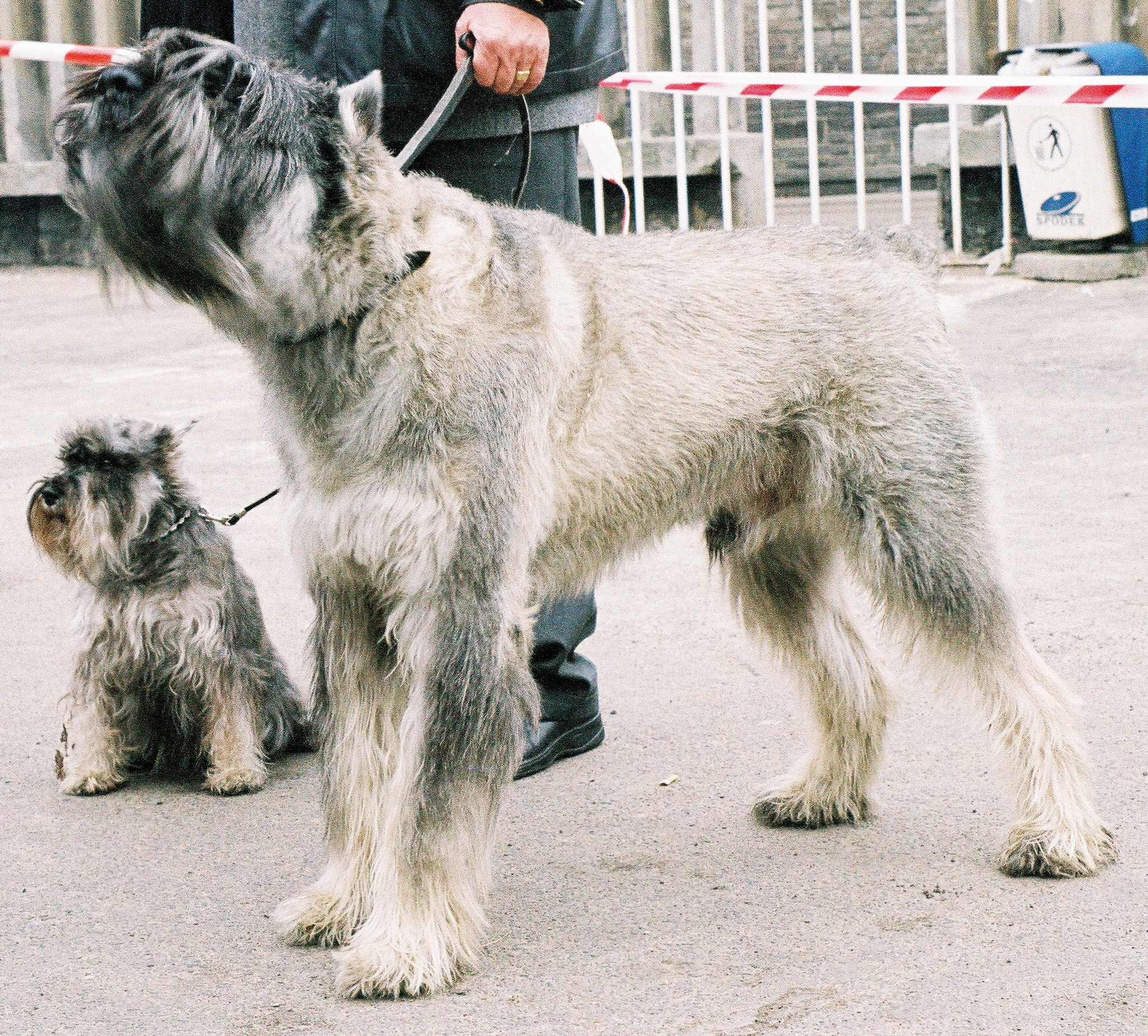
Size difference between a Miniature Schnauzer and a Giant Schnauzer

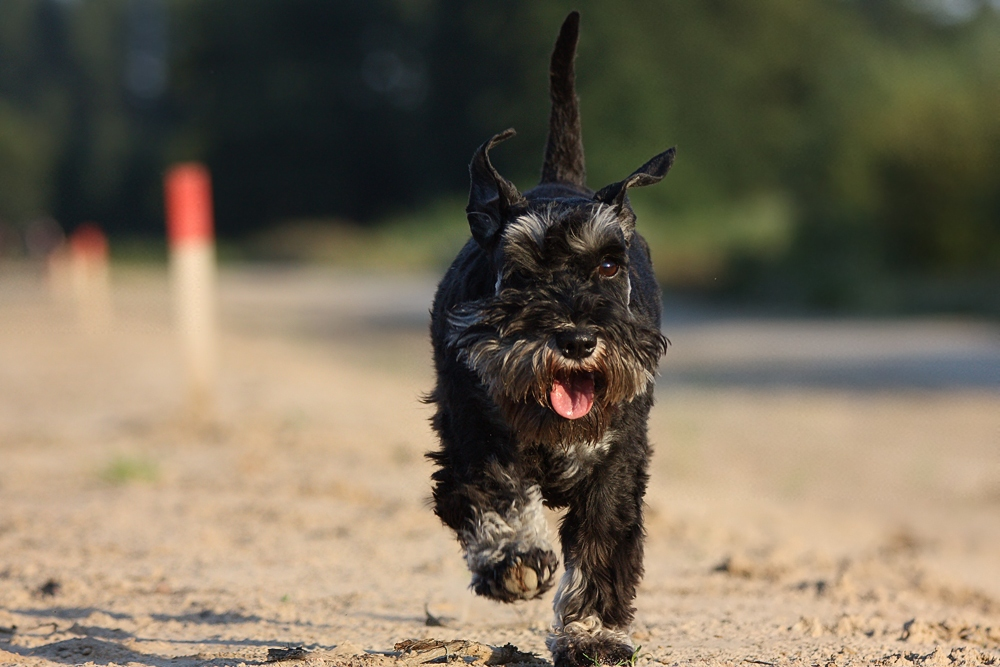
Miniature Schnauzer running

The breed is of above average intelligence and can be independent minded, so early training and diverse daily exercise are recommended. Based on Stanley Coren's book The Intelligence of Dogs (2006) ranking methodology, the Miniature ranked 12th, Standard 18th, and Giant 28th out of 140 breeds within 79 ranks on the ability to learn and obey new commands, e.g., working and obedience intelligence. The first two were grouped among "excellent working dogs", while the Giant among "above-average working dogs". Additionally, experts ranked the Miniature as 5th among top 15 breeds at watchdog barking ability, the Giant as 6th among top 13 breeds at effective guard ability, while in adaptive intelligence all three breeds showed good problem-solving abilities. They are protective and energetic, and will alert members of the household to any potential danger, although its watchful nature can lead to persistent barking. To avoid annoying the neighbors, dog owners should make every effort to curb excessive barking through training.

Schnauzers have distinctive beards and long, feathery eyebrows. They are generally either a salt-and-pepper colour, black, or white, but they can be brown also. Some owners shave their Schnauzers down the back while the hairs on their legs are kept long and curly, but this may change the coat colour, so show Schnauzers especially will have their back coat "stripped" by hand, to encourage the salt-and-pepper pattern to emerge. It was traditional to have the tails docked and the ears cropped to give an alert appearance, but that is now illegal in many countries. For dogs used as ratters, docking and cropping left less for rats to grab on to when being attacked and reduced their ability to resist. Cropping and docking are now illegal in the European Union, Australia, and New Zealand, and are becoming less common elsewhere. The Schnauzer's beard and leg hair should be brushed often to prevent mats from forming.

Schnauzers have a double coat. The top or guard coat is wiry and water-resistant, while the undercoat is soft. Stripping removes the undercoat and stimulates the hard top coat to come in fuller. The undercoat may be "stripped" (loose, dead hair is plucked) at least twice a year. A stripped Schnauzer will have a hard wiry coat as described in the breed standard. A shaved pet will lose the wiry top coat and only exhibit the soft undercoat. Schnauzers shed less often than most dogs.

== Health ==
Schnauzers are prone to hepatobiliary disease. One study found the schnauzer to be 8.06 times more likely to acquire a reversive hepatocelluar injury (liver damage secondary to an endocrinopathy such as Cushing's syndrome and hypothyroidism), 10.7 times more likely to acquire impaired hepatic perfusion, and 16.29 times more likely to acquire gall bladder mucocele.
