= Danish Spitz =

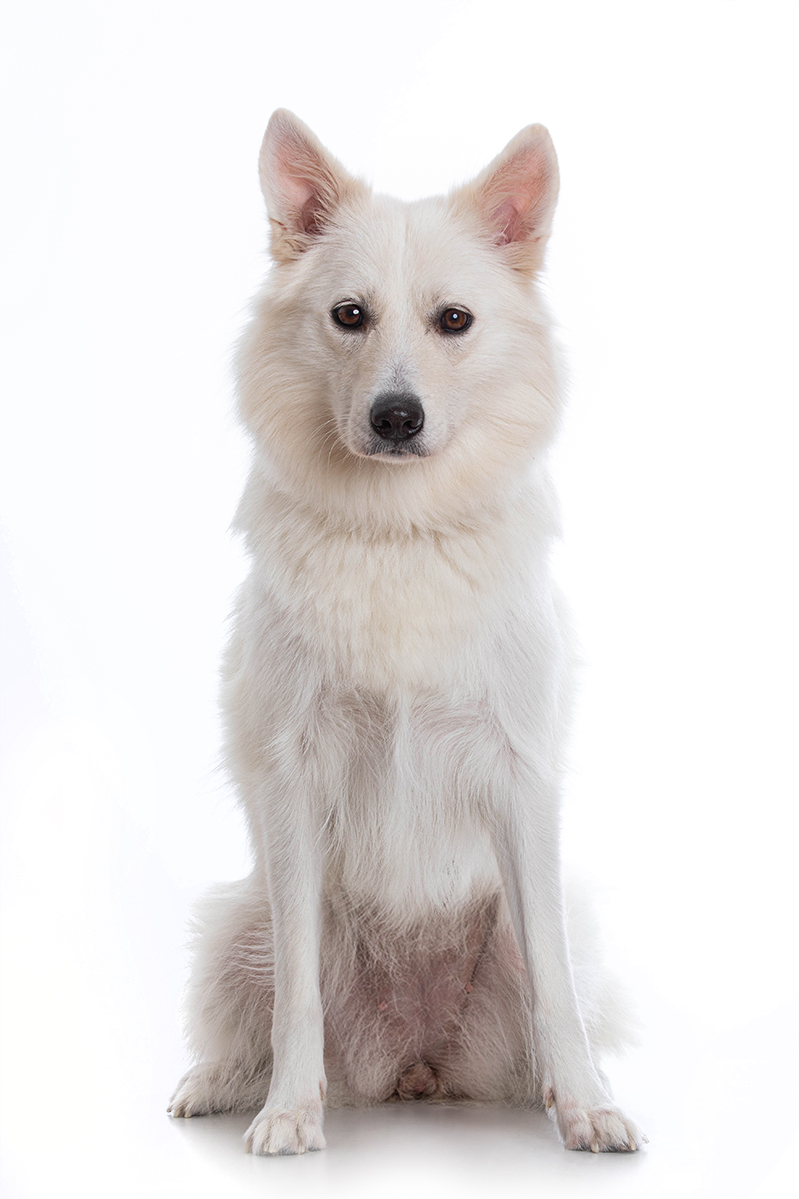
- Other names: Wolf spitz, Greenland spitz, Samoyed spitz, White spitz, Danish white spitz
- Origin: Denmark
Traits
Height	Males	minimum 17–19 in (43–48 cm)
	Females	minimum 15–18 in (38–46 cm)
- Weight: minimum 26–40 lb (12–18 kg)
- Coat: soft dense
- Colour: white to biscuit
Kennel club standards
- Dansk Kennel Club: standard

The Danish Spitz is a dog breed, originating from Denmark. The breed is known for making a good family pet, particularly as they are patient with children. Throughout time they've been known under various names, including Samoyed Spitz, Wolf Spitz, Greenland Spitz and White Spitz, which made it difficult to keep track of the breed and the breeding. Today the breed is known as the Danish Spitz.

From January 1, 2013 it was made possible to register dogs of the breed in DKK – the Kennel club in Denmark, registered under the Fédération Cynologique Internationale. It is still not recognized by FCI, but are currently being rebuilt and registered to the X-register of the Danish Kennel Club. It is possible to show the breed in the Denmark and the Nordic countries. Due to not yet being officially recognized, it is still not widely known in Denmark or the rest of the world.

It belongs to the group of Spitz dogs and shares a common resemblance to the Samoyed, American Eskimo Dog, Japanese Spitz and Volpino Italiano.

== Origin and history ==
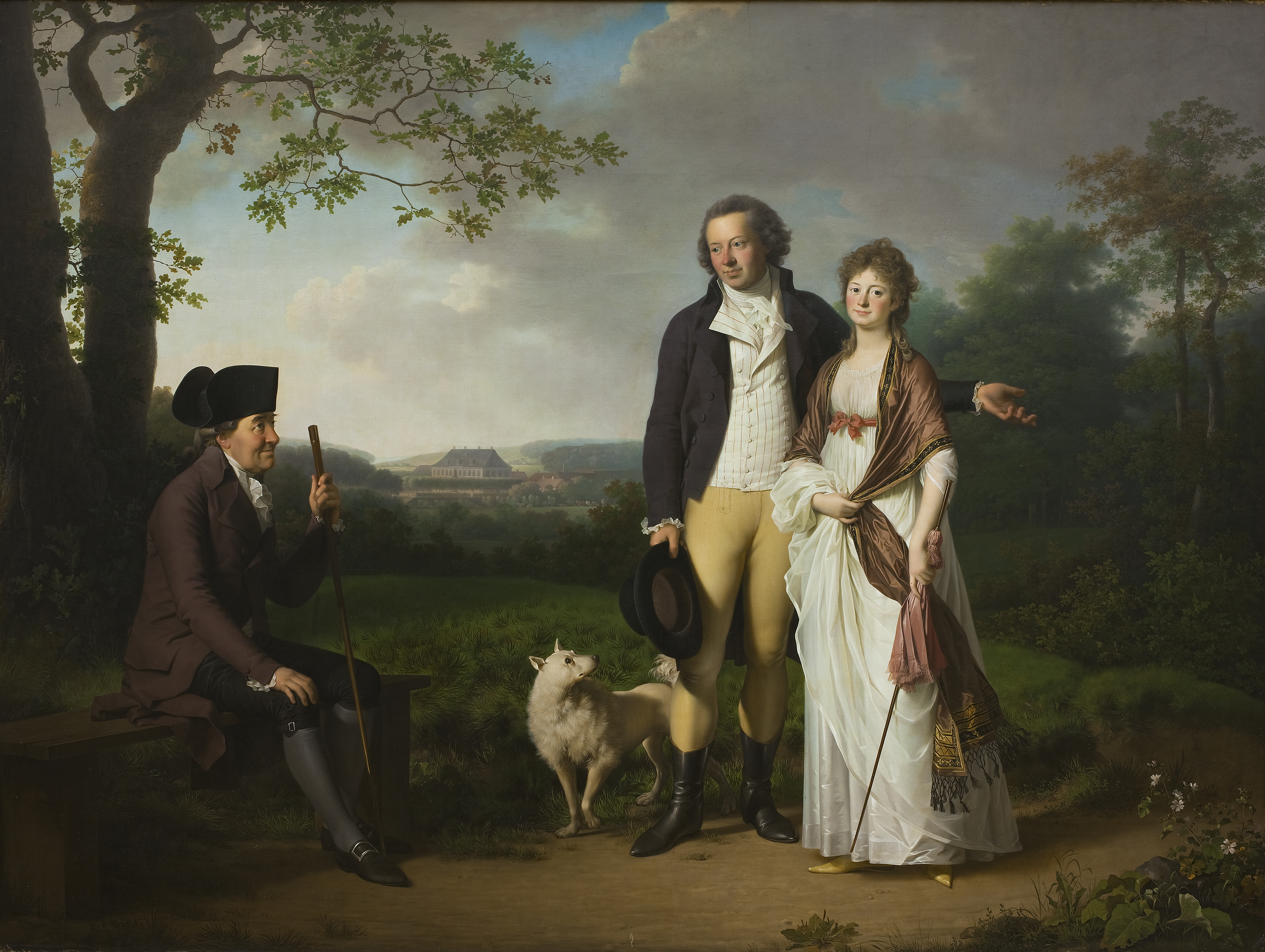
"Det Rybergske familiebillede" (1797) by Jens Juel, shows a clipped Danish Spitz

They have commonly been used as a companion dog in the countryside, especially in Jutland, but was further back primarily owned by the bourgeoisie. The breed had its glory in the 1930s, when it was relatively common on farms all around. The Danish main job of the breed was to take care of the children, and it was therefore commonly known as the children's dog. Since that time the number of Danish spitz has decreased tremendously, and the breed almost became extinct. But since the late 1980s, some have made great efforts to reconstruct the breed as we know it. Today, there's an increasing number of the breed, which are all managed by DKK – a club under the FCI.

== Coat and color ==
Their coats occur in white to biscuit colors. The top coat is flat, and sheds in small amounts throughout the year. The undercoat is soft, and keeps them cool in the summer, and warm in the winter; it sheds in the spring and in the fall. The coat of the Danish Spitz is of medium length, and should not stand out from the body. It is slightly longer at the ears, with feathering at the backs of their thighs and legs. The tail should be bushy and carried curled over the back. It is allowed to hang when the dog is calm.

== Temperament ==
The temperament of the Danish Spitz is a hallmark of the breed, and is described as "Lively, friendly, curious and brave".

== Gallery ==
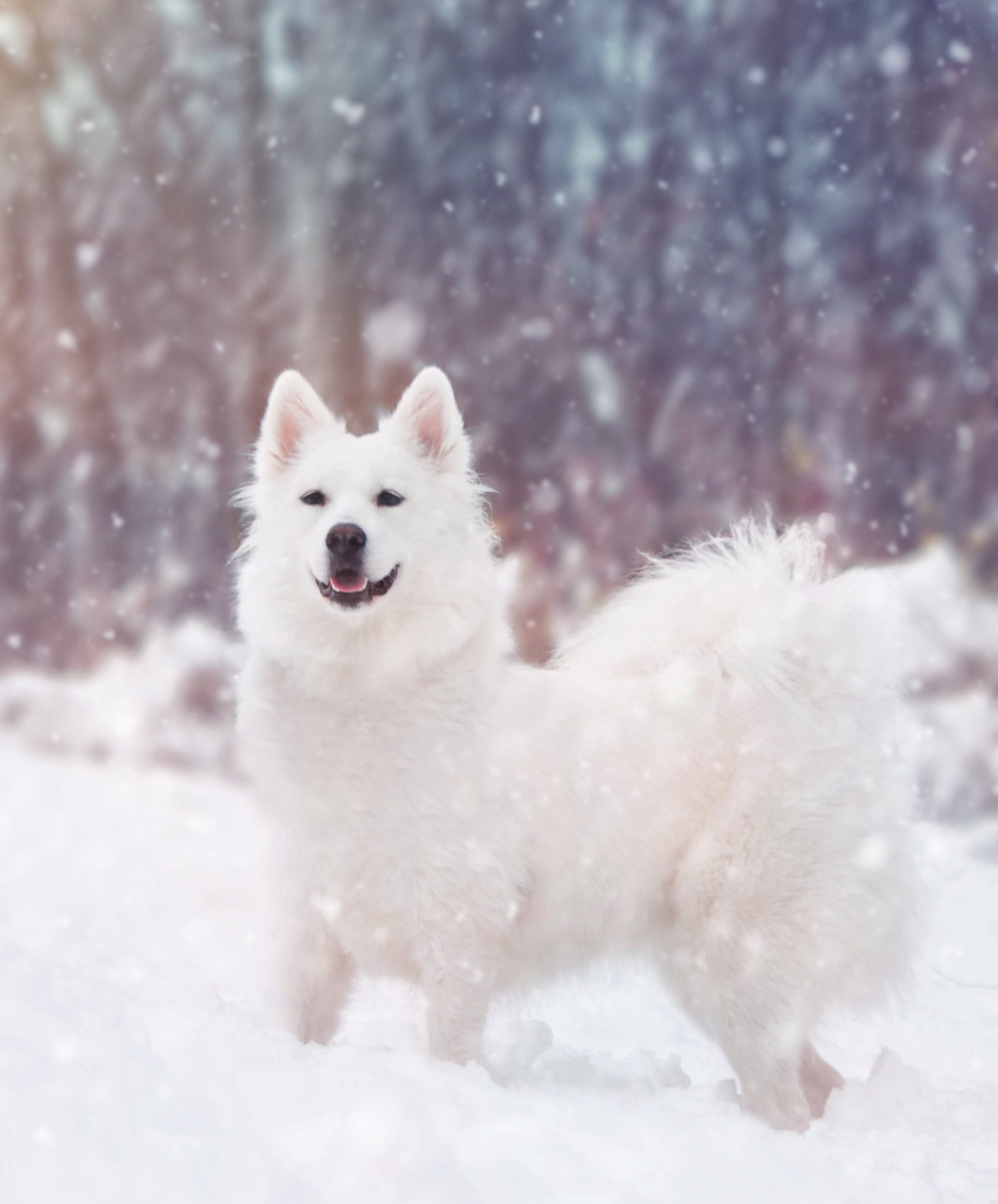

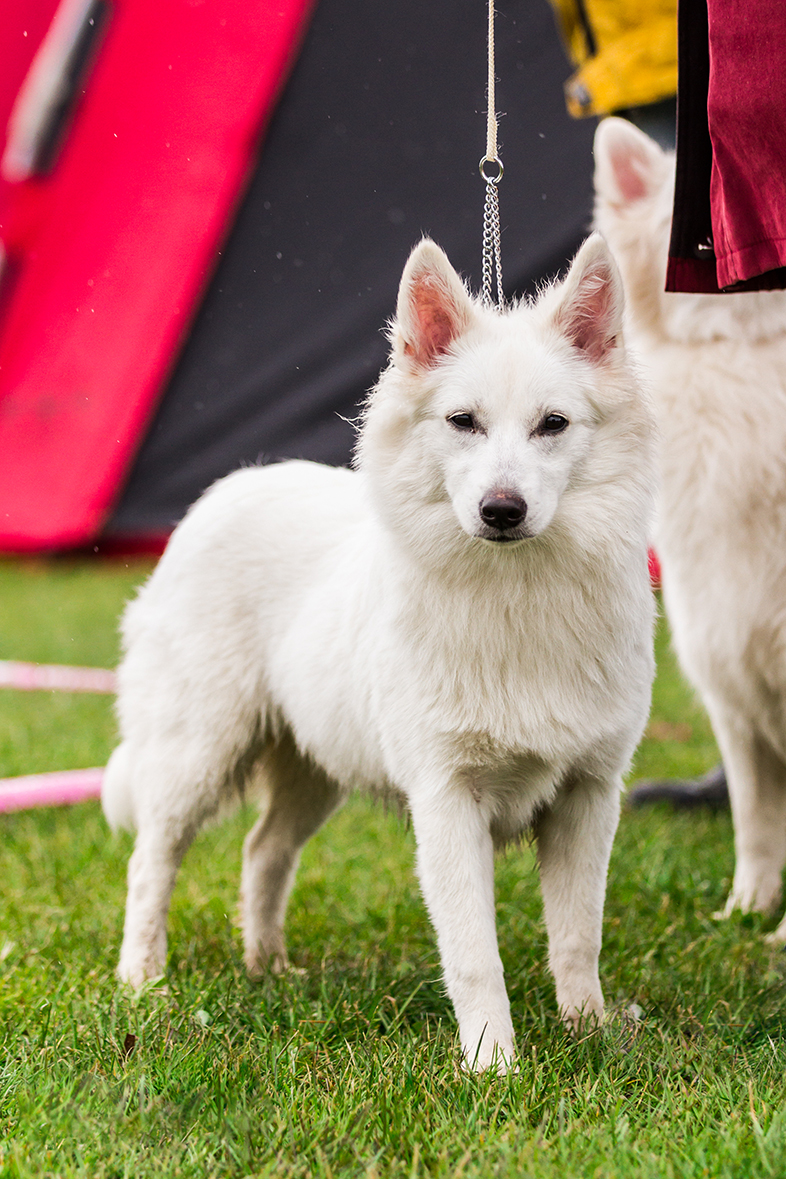

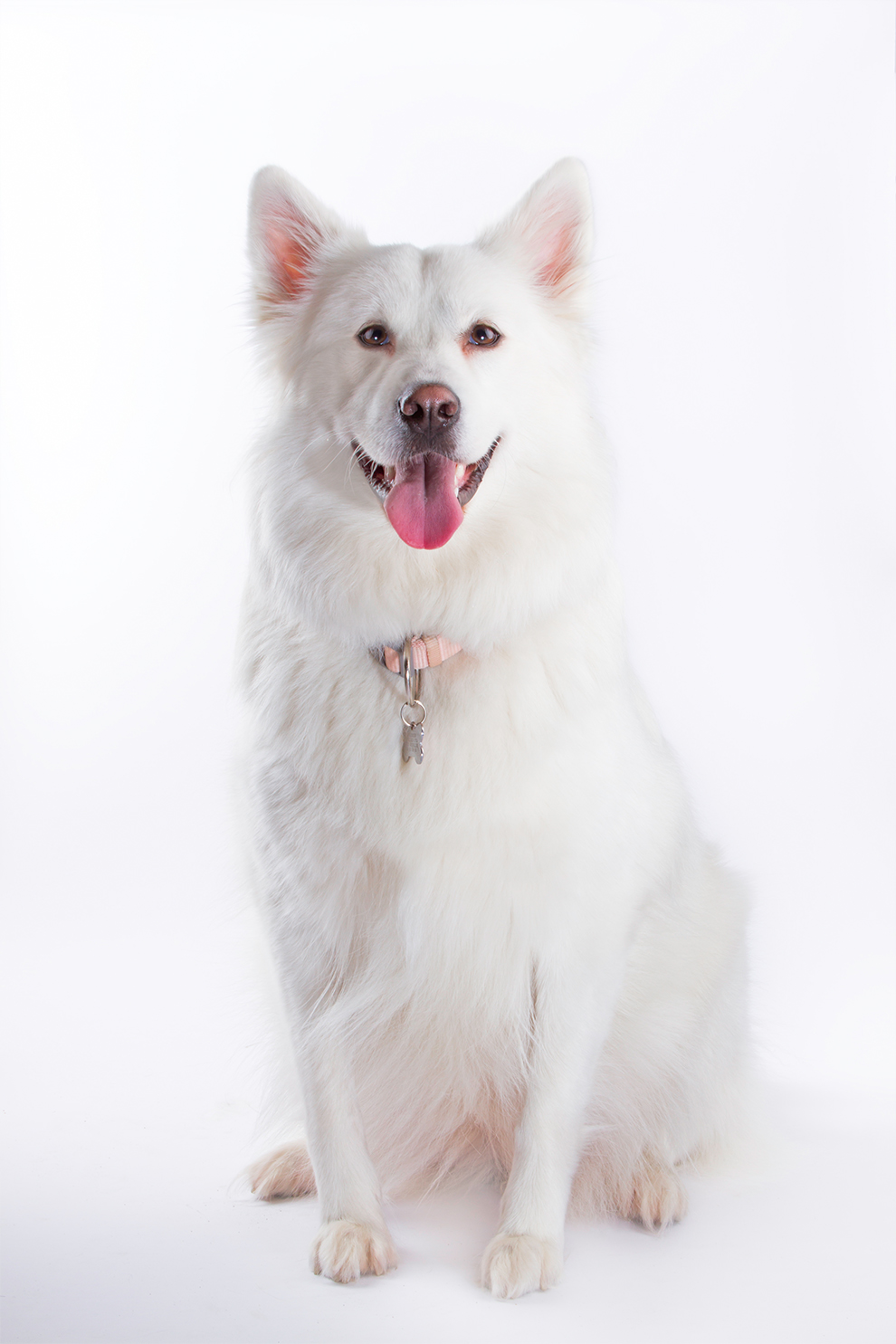

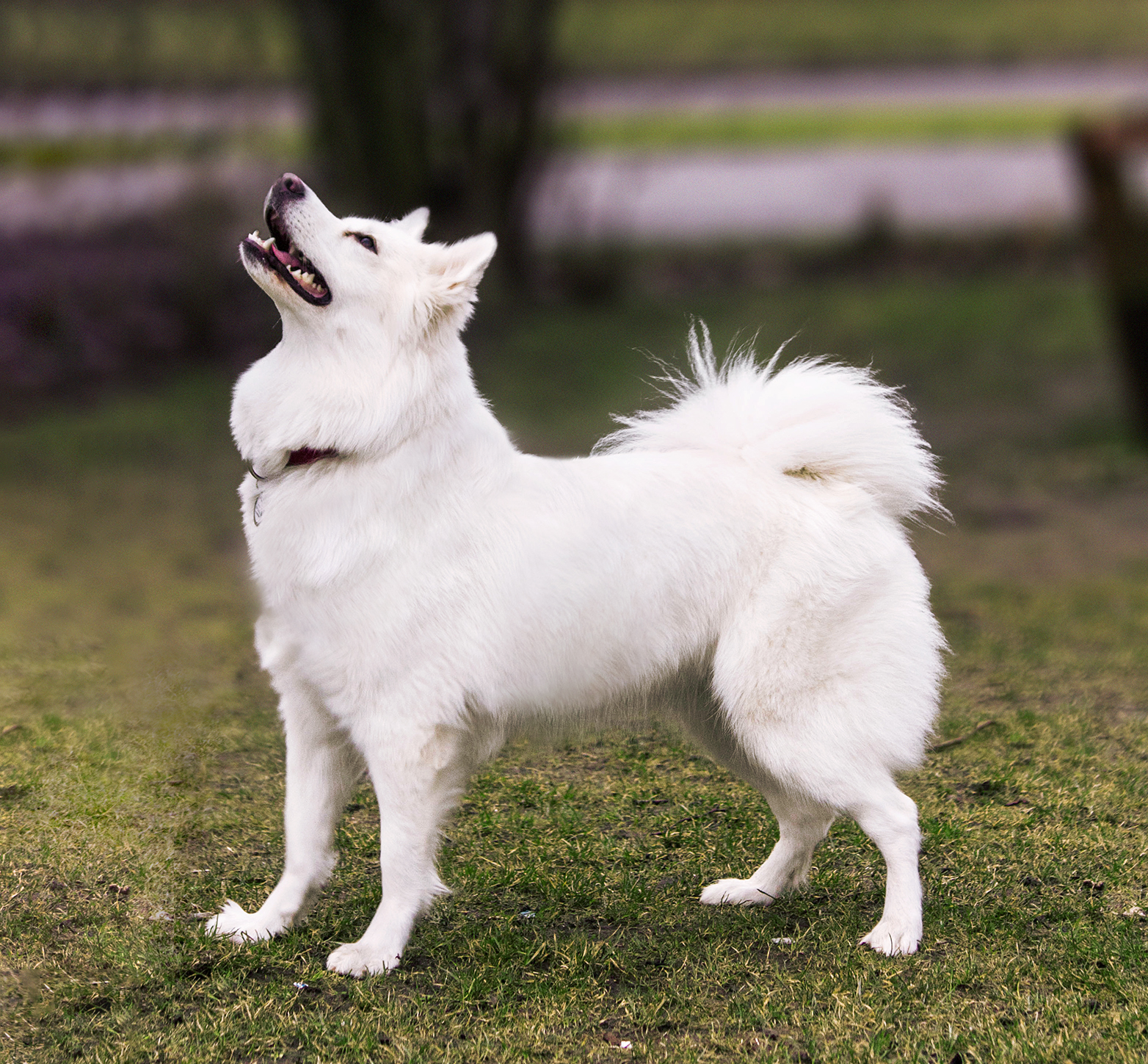

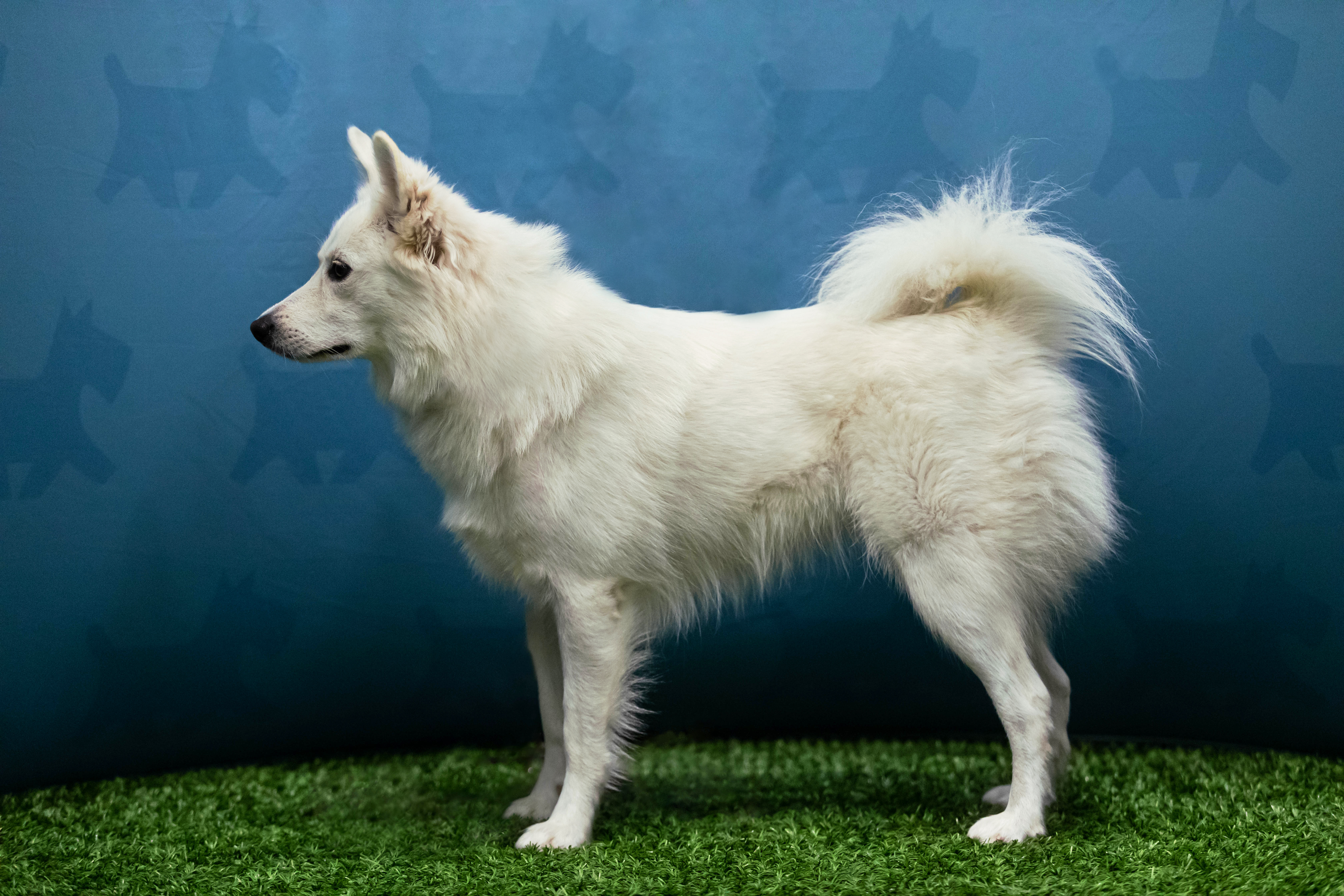

== See also ==
- List of dog breeds
