= American Eskimo Dog =

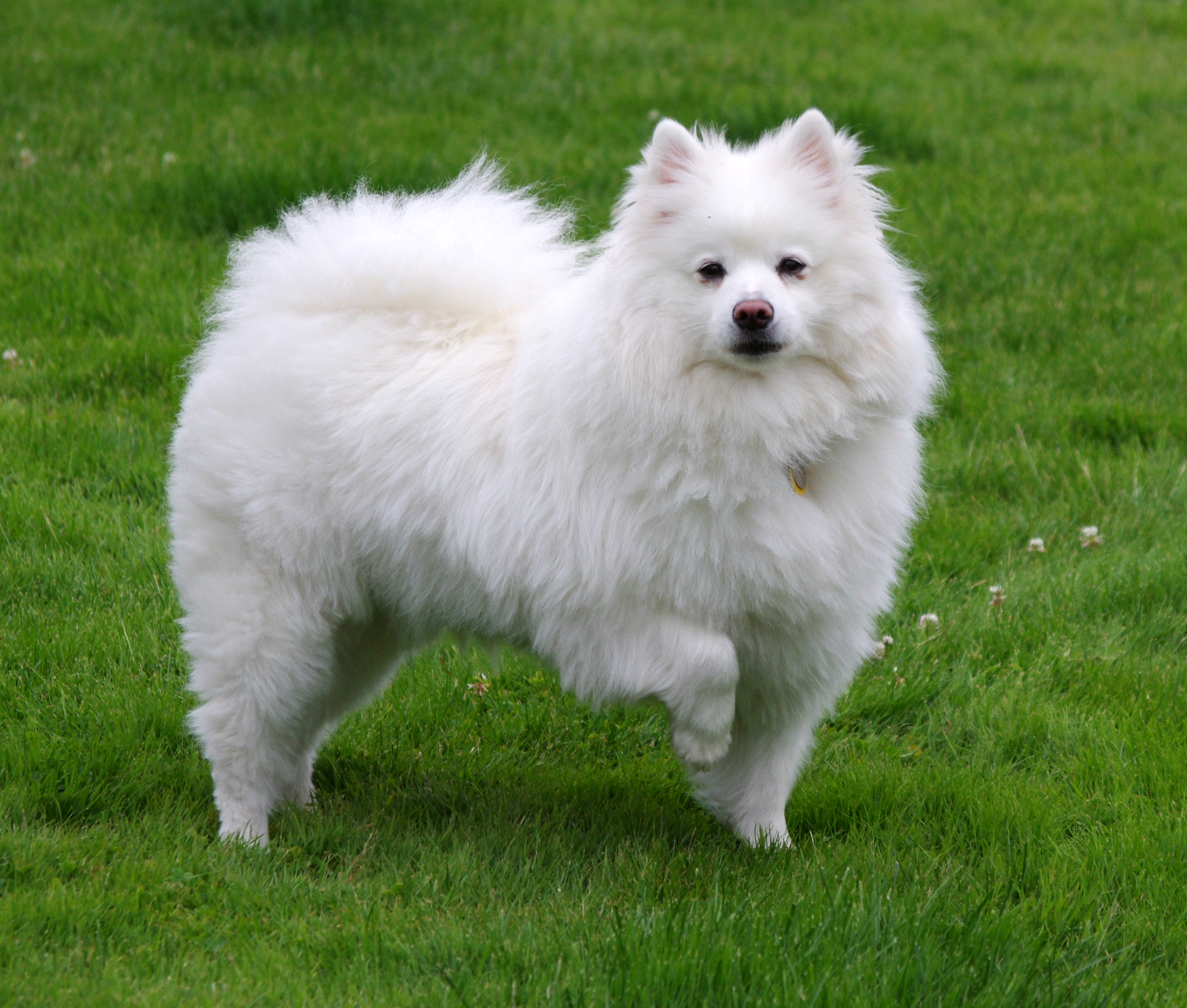
- American Eskimo Dog (miniature size)
- Other names: American Spitz; German Spitz
- Origin: Germany
Traits
- Color: white
Kennel club standards
- American Kennel Club: standard

The American Eskimo Dog is a breed of companion dog, originating in Germany. The American Eskimo Dog is a member of the Spitz family. The breed's progenitors were German Spitz, but due to anti-German sentiment during the First World War, it was renamed "American Eskimo Dog." Although modern American Eskimo Dogs have been exported as German Spitz Gross (or Mittel, depending on the dog's height), the breeds have diverged and the standards are significantly different. In addition to serving as a watchdog and companion, the American Eskimo Dog also achieved a high degree of popularity in the United States in the 1930s and 1940s as a circus performer.

There are three size varieties of the American Eskimo Dog breed, the toy, the miniature and the standard. They share a common resemblance with Japanese Spitz, Danish Spitz, Volpino Italiano, German Spitz, Indian Spitz, and Samoyeds.

== History ==
In Northern Europe, smaller Spitz were eventually developed into the various German Spitz breeds. European immigrants brought their Spitz pets with them to the United States, especially New York, in the early 1900s, "all of them descended from the larger German Spitz, the Keeshond, the white Pomeranian, and the Italian Spitz, the Volpino Italiano."

Although white was not always a recognized color in the various German Spitz breeds, it was generally the preferred color in the US. In a display of patriotism in the era around World War I, dog owners began referring to their pets as American Spitz rather than German Spitz.

After World War I, the small Spitz dogs came to the attention of the American public when the dogs became popular entertainers in the American circus. In 1917, the Cooper Brothers’ Railroad Circus featured the dogs. A dog named Stout's Pal Pierre was famous for walking a tightrope with the Barnum and Bailey Circus in the 1930s, and also contributing to their popularity, they sold puppies after the show. Due to the popularity of the circus dogs, many of today's American Eskimo Dogs can trace their lineage back to these circus dogs.

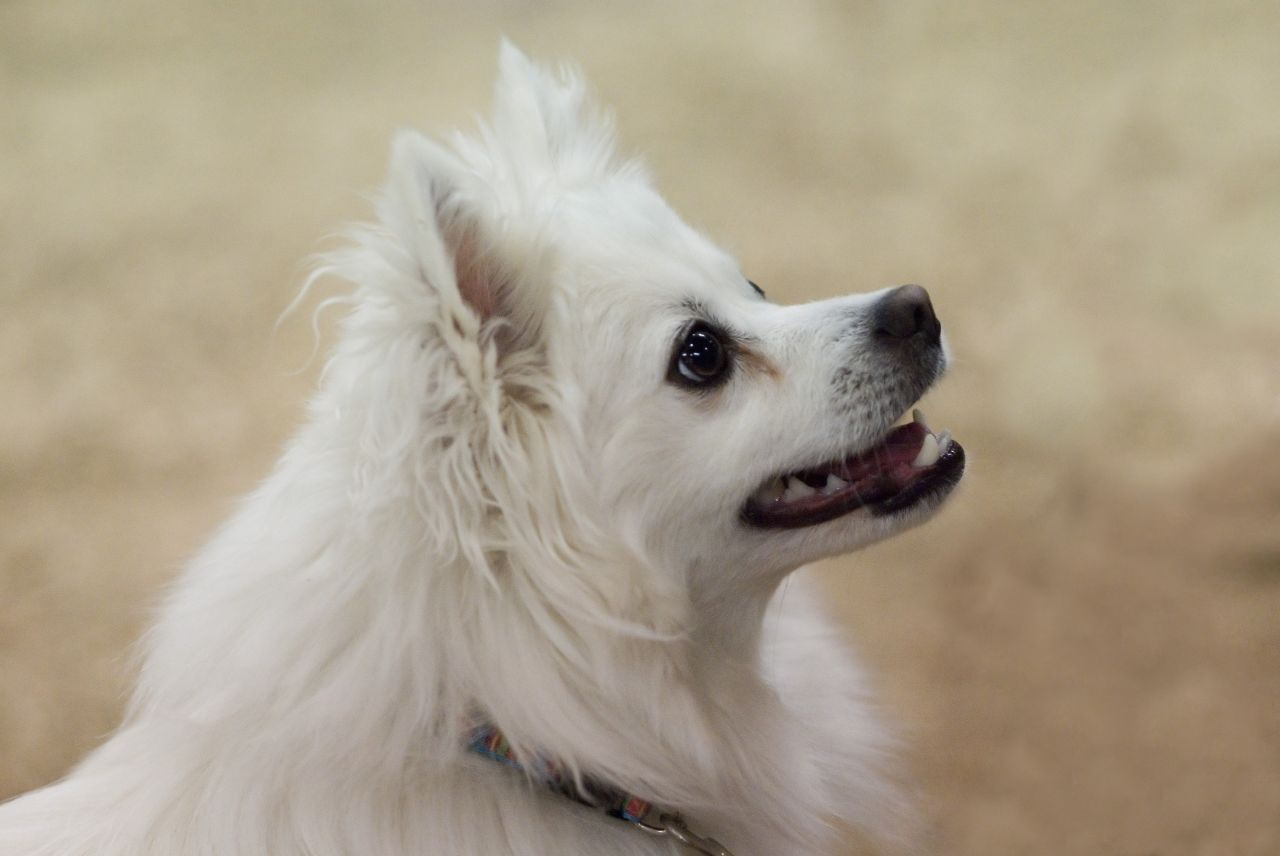
American Eskimo Dog portrait.

After World War II, the dogs continued to be popular pets. Postwar contact with Japan led to importation into the United States of the Japanese Spitz, which may have been crossed into the breed at this time. The breed was first officially recognized as the "American Eskimo" as early as 1919 by the American United Kennel Club (UKC), and the first written record and history of the breed was printed in 1958 by the UKC. At that time there was no official breed club and no breed standard, and dogs were accepted for registration as single dogs, based on appearance. In 1970 the National American Eskimo Dog Association (NAEDA) was founded, and single dog registrations ceased. In 1985 the American Eskimo Dog Club of America (AEDCA) was formed by fanciers who wished to register the breed with the American Kennel Club (AKC). Following the AKC's requirements for breed recognition, the AEDCA collected the pedigree information from 1,750 dogs that now form the basis of the AKC recognized breed, which is called the American Eskimo Dog. The breed was recognized by the American Kennel Club in 1995. The stud book was opened from 2000 to 2003 in an attempt to register more of the original UKC registered lines, and today many American Eskimo Dogs are dual-registered with both American kennel clubs. The breed was recognized by the Canadian Kennel Club in 2006.

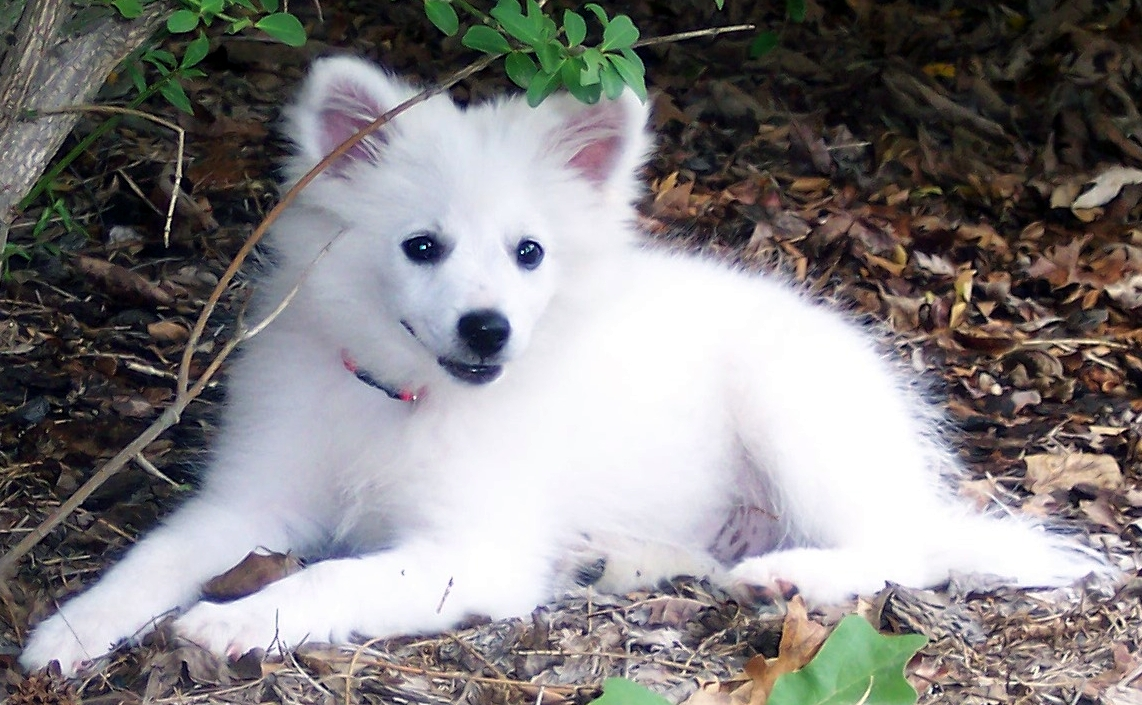
American Eskimo Dog puppy

== Characteristics ==
American Eskimo Dogs are usually white, though white and biscuit is also accepted by the AKC. They are double-coated, with thick straight fur and a ruff around the neck and shoulders. The tail is heavily furred and generally curls over their back.

=== Size ===
American Eskimo Dogs are small to medium dogs, and come in three size varieties:

- Toy: 9–12 inches and 5–10 lbs / 22–30 cm and 2.27–4.5 kg
- Miniature: 12–15 inches and 10–20 lbs / 30–40 cm and 4.5–9 kg
- Standard: 15–20 inches and 15–40 lbs / 38–50 cm and 6.8–18 kg

== See also ==
- List of dog breeds
