= Alaskan Klee Kai =

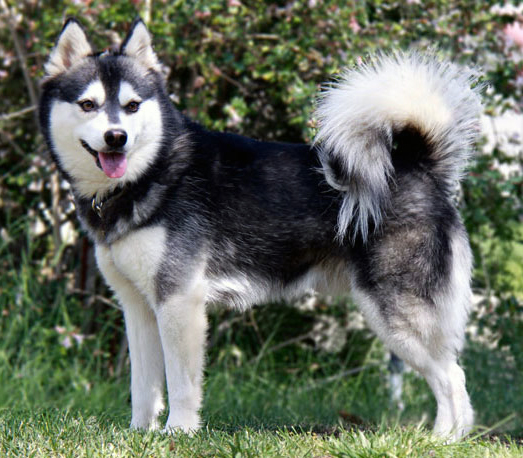
- A Standard Alaskan Klee Kai
- Other names: Klee Kai
- Origin: United States
Traits
- Height: Toy: up to 13 in (33 cm); Miniature: 13–15 in (33–38 cm); Standard: 15–17 in (38–43 cm);
- Weight: Toy: up to 9 lb (4.1 kg); Miniature: 10–15 lb (4.5–6.8 kg); Standard: 16–22 lb (7.3–10.0 kg);
- Coat: Standard or full-coated
- Color: Black and white, gray and white, red and white and pure white.
- Litter size: 1–5 pups They can vary on color and change as they grow older,
Kennel club standards
- United Kennel Club: standard
- American Kennel Club: standard

The Alaskan Klee Kai is an American spitz-type breed of dog, developed in the late 20th century as a companion-sized dog resembling the larger Alaskan Malamute and Siberian Husky. It is an energetic, intelligent dog with an appearance that reflects its northern heritage. Bred in three sizes, its weight range is from 5 to 22 pounds as an adult, depending on whether it is a standard, toy, or miniature.

== History ==
The name Klee Kai comes from the Athabaskan words meaning “little dog”. The breed was originally developed in Alaska by Linda Spurlin in the 1970s. The breed was created using the Alaskan Husky, a small amount of Siberian Husky, a slightly larger amount of American Eskimo Dog, and some Schipperkes. Spurlin followed her brother's advice to "breed the best, and cull the rest" in order to create the breed.

== Description ==
The average Alaskan Klee Kai's temperament is curious, agile, aloof, and intelligent. They can be so intelligent that they can become stubborn, which is considered an unwanted trait. They excel at agility, and even though they are small dogs, they are thick-boned and can withstand high jumps. Their small size can be advantageous to agility training, allowing them to move with ease.

They come in any shade of three colors: red and white, black and white, and gray and white. Any solid color in Alaskan Klee Kai may disqualify dogs from show rings and breeding programs, as it is stated in the breed standard.

The three sizes of an Alaskan Klee Kai are: Toy, Miniature, and Standard.

The Toy Alaskan Klee Kai can be up to 13 inches or 33 cm tall and weighs less than 10 pounds or 4.5 kg. The Miniature Alaskan Klee Kai can be 13–15 inches or 33-38 cm tall and weigh 10–15 pounds or 4.5-6.8 kg. The Standard size Alaskan Klee Kai can be 15–17 inches or 33-43 cm tall (17-17.5 inches or 43-44.5 cm is still considered a standard size Alaskan Klee Kai, but is a fault) and weigh 15–20 lbs or 6.8-9 kg. Specific weight ranges were included in the Original AKKAOA Standards 1993, but subsequent revisions call only for weight to be proportional to the height of the dog.

Alaskan Klee Kai are prone to developing juvenile cataracts, liver disease, factor VII deficiency and heart problems. Thyroid problems have also been observed. Due to the relatively young age of the breed in general, it is possible that not enough time has elapsed to fully determine the prevalence of genetic disease in this breed, although it is believed that this breed is relatively healthy.

== See also ==
- List of dog breeds
