= Indian Spitz =

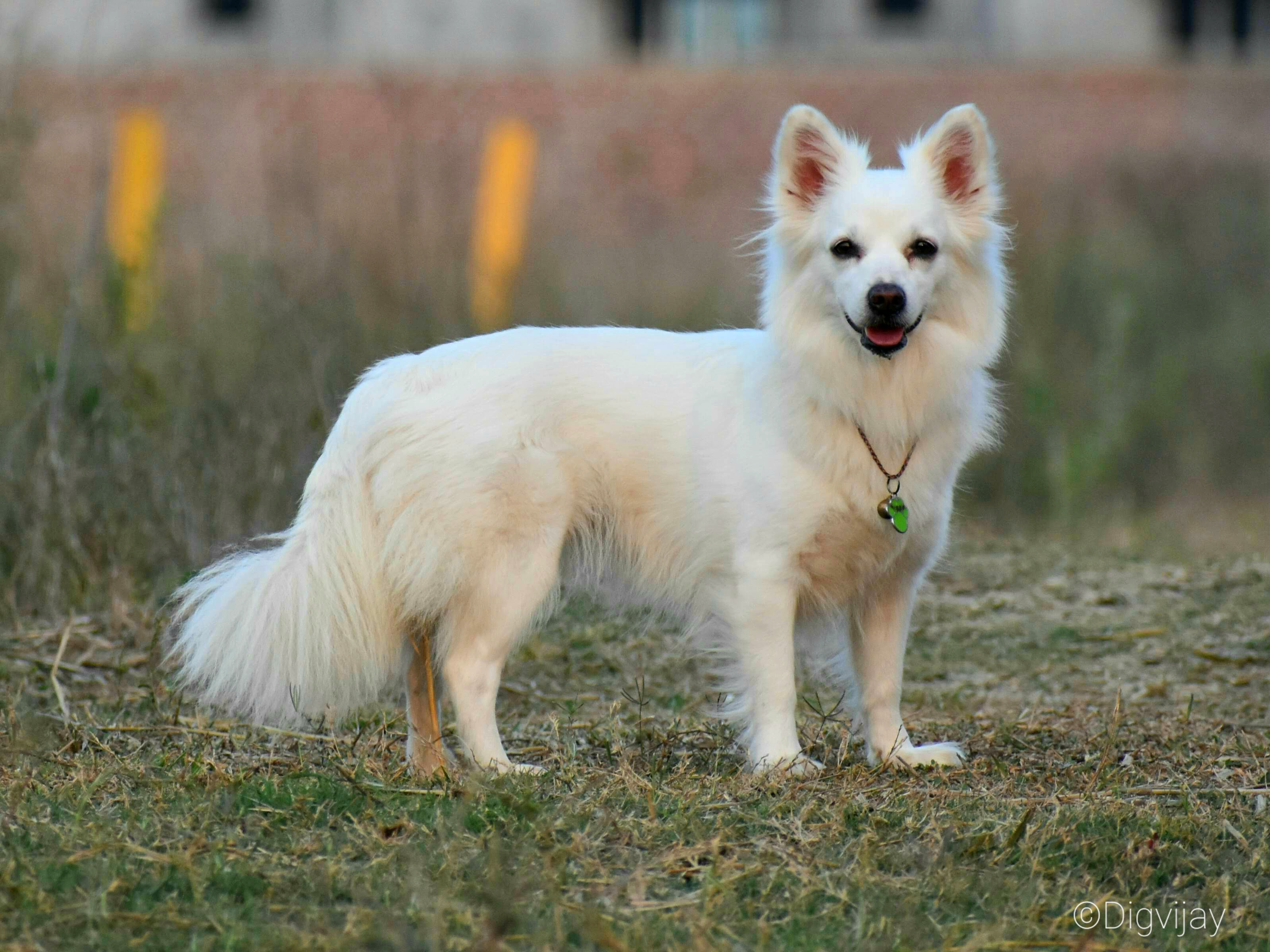
- A female Indian Spitz
- Common nicknames: Pista, pisha dog
- Origin: India
Traits
Height	Males	35–45 cm (14–18 in)
	Females	40 cm (16 in)
Weight	Males	15–20 kg (33–44 lb)
	Females	10–15 kg (22–33 lb)
- Coat: Predominantly white, dusky brown, black, mixed coat colours
- Litter size: 5–8 puppies

The Indian Spitz is a spitz dog breed belonging to the utility group. The Indian Spitz was one of the most popular dogs in India in the 1980s and 1990s when India's import rules made it difficult to import dogs of other breeds.

== History ==
The Indian Spitz was first introduced by the British during the 19th century and thought to have descended from the German Spitz. After years of breeding, they were able to create a breed that could cope with the heat of Indian summers and retained the intelligence and adaptability of the German breed. Resembling a Samoyed and Pomeranian, the Indian Spitz was well-suited to the Indian climate and quickly became popular.

The Indian Spitz became popular due to restrictive import rules imposed by the Indian Government in the 1980s and 1990s. Foreign imports were hard to access, and Indians turned to the indigenous and local breeds. The Indian Spitz is similar to the European Spitz, though it has adapted to a warmer climate.

== Appearance ==
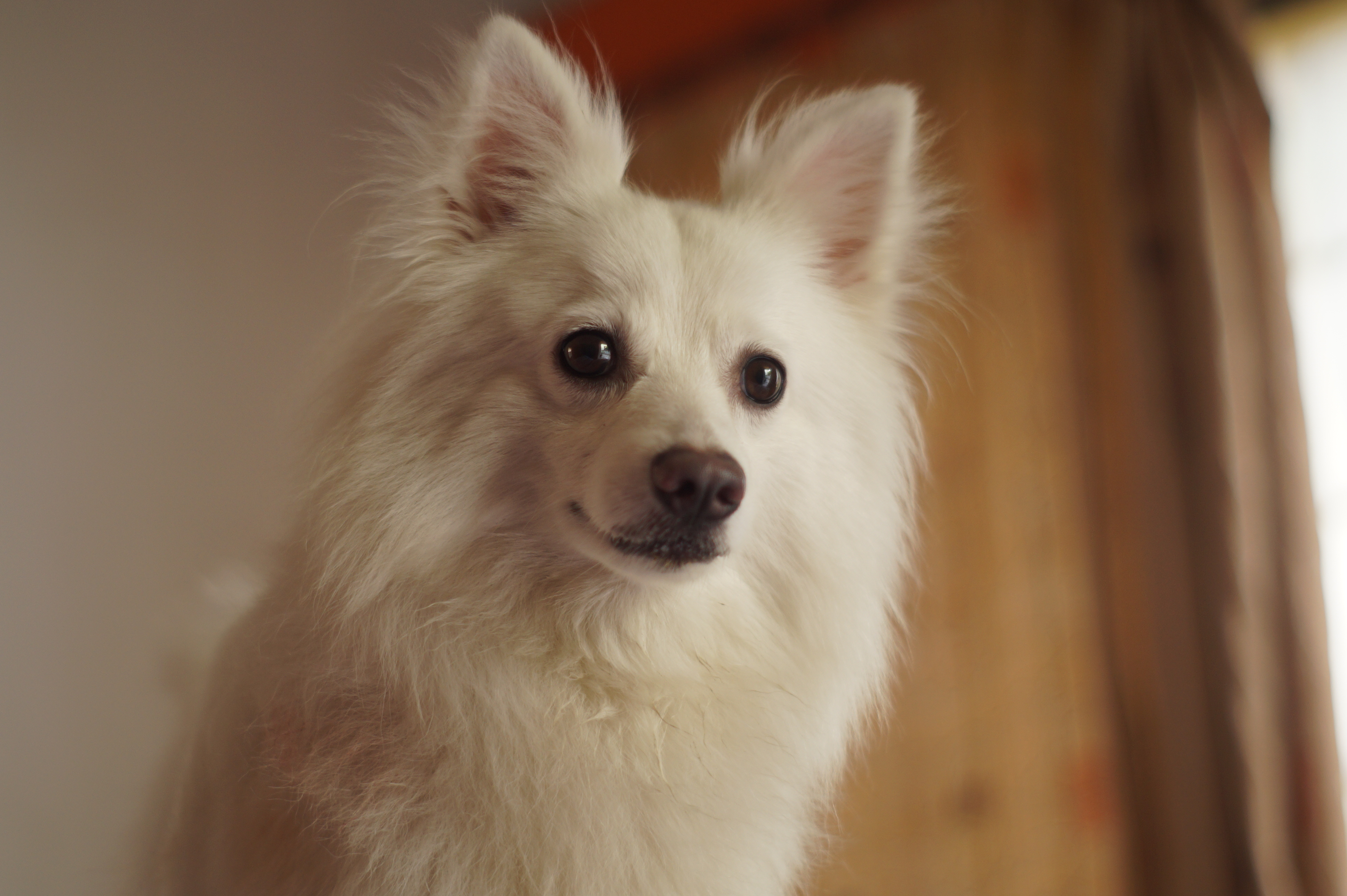
Two year old male Indian Spitz

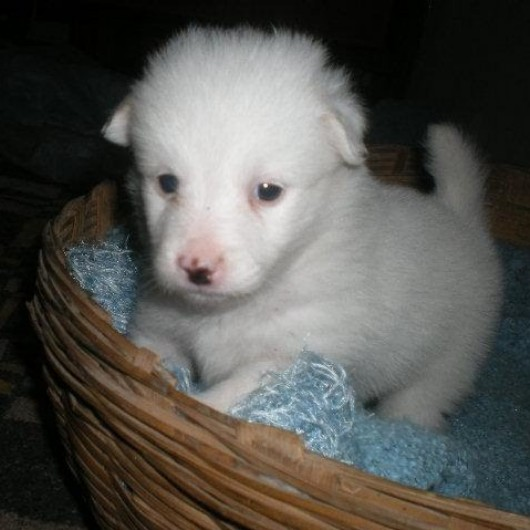
An Indian Spitz puppy with conical snout and pointy, fox-like ears set high up on their head

Indian Spitzes are small dogs - around 33 cm (13 in) at the withers - with a soft chest, fair tail, and a milky white double coat. Their eyes have visible irises that can be green or blue, giving them an unusually expressive face.

The original Spitz was bred for hunting in cold conditions, and their white coloring reflects this. Although the same conditions are not found in India, their coloring is attractive and has remained through the years. Some can be white and brown.

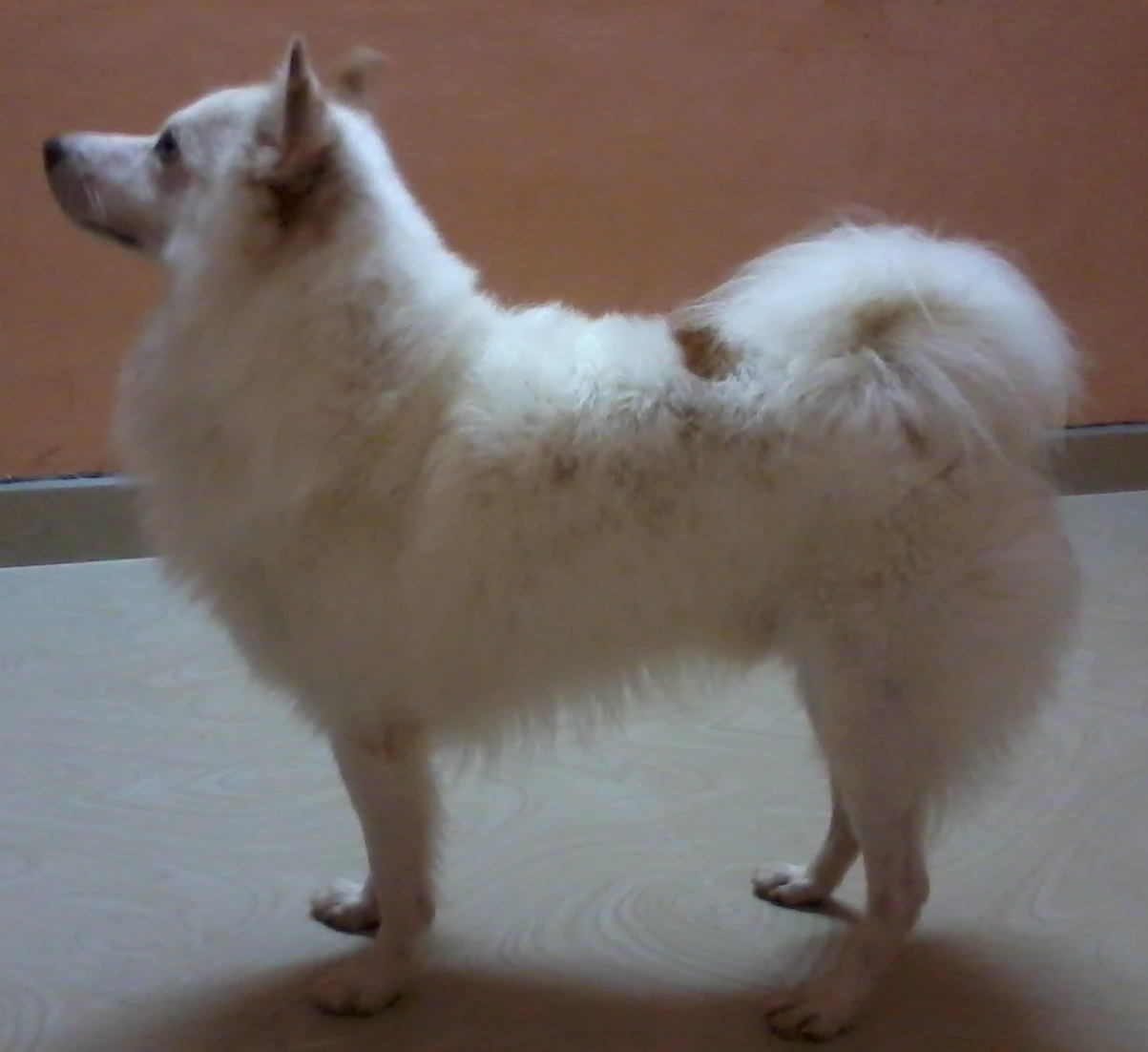
Indian Spitz

Pointy fox-like ears make this breed especially expressive. Thick fur covers the outside of the ears and much of the inside as well, requiring extra attention when it comes to care and grooming.

The tail of an Indian Spitz curls over their back and is quite fluffy. Their legs are only slightly longer than their bodies, which makes their heads look large. Indian Spitzes may be one of the easiest dogs to live with, making them one of the most popular family dog among Indian breeds. They are easily housebroken and trained. Grooming and exercise are relatively low maintenance, and they are highly adaptable dogs. They are equally comfortable in small apartments and in large, open houses. However, they do need moderate exercise.

=== Size variations ===
Generally Indian Spitzes are divided into two categories, the Smaller Indian Spitz or Lesser Indian Spitz (roughly 5–7 kg in weight and 22–25 cm at the withers), and the Bigger Indian Spitz or Greater Indian Spitz (roughly 12–20 kg in weight and 35–45 cm at the withers).

The Indian Spitz is generally milky white but can also be found in solid colours like brown and sometimes (very rarely) a mix of black and white similar to the Pomeranian.

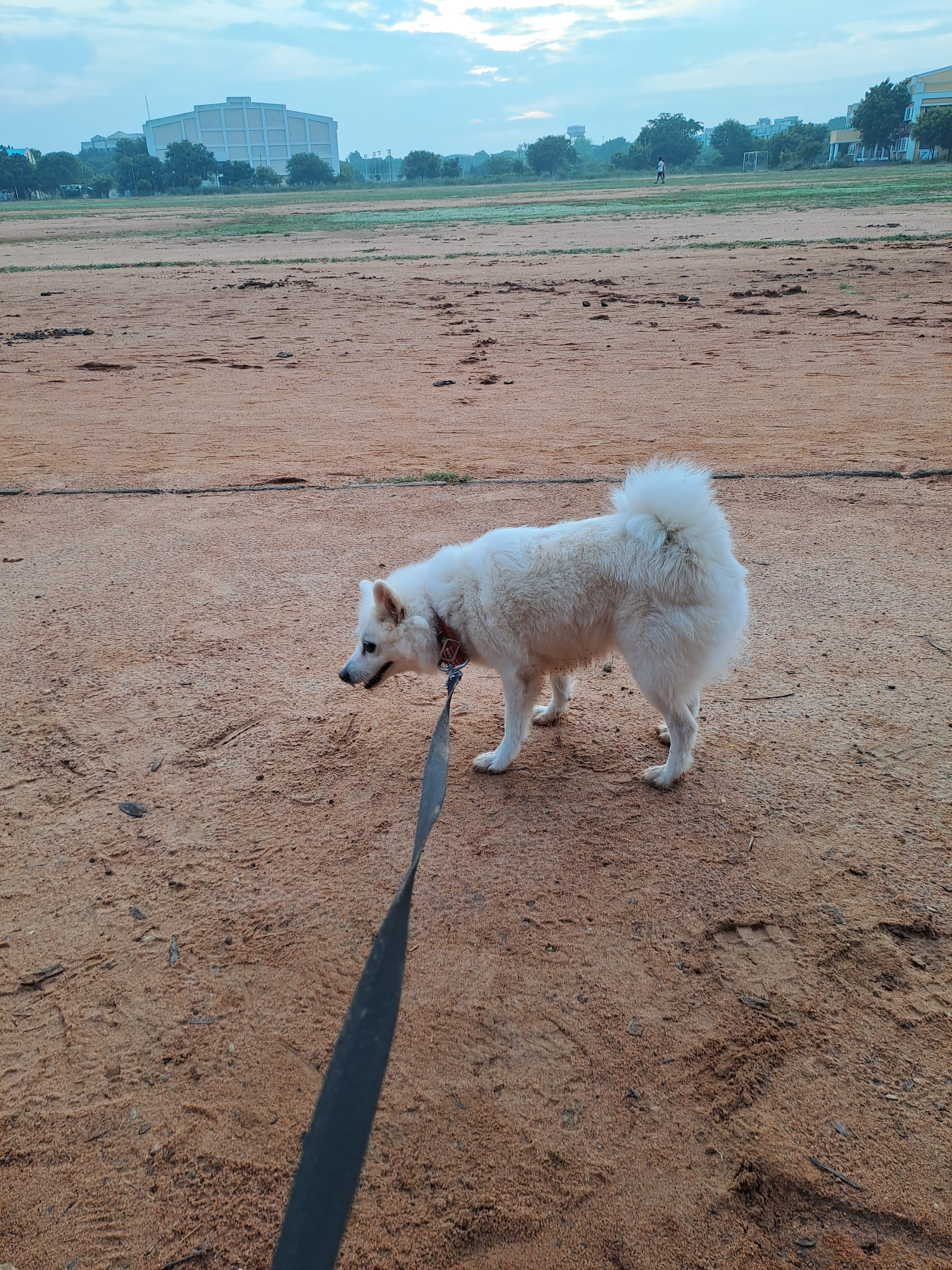
A Lesser Indian Spitz dog

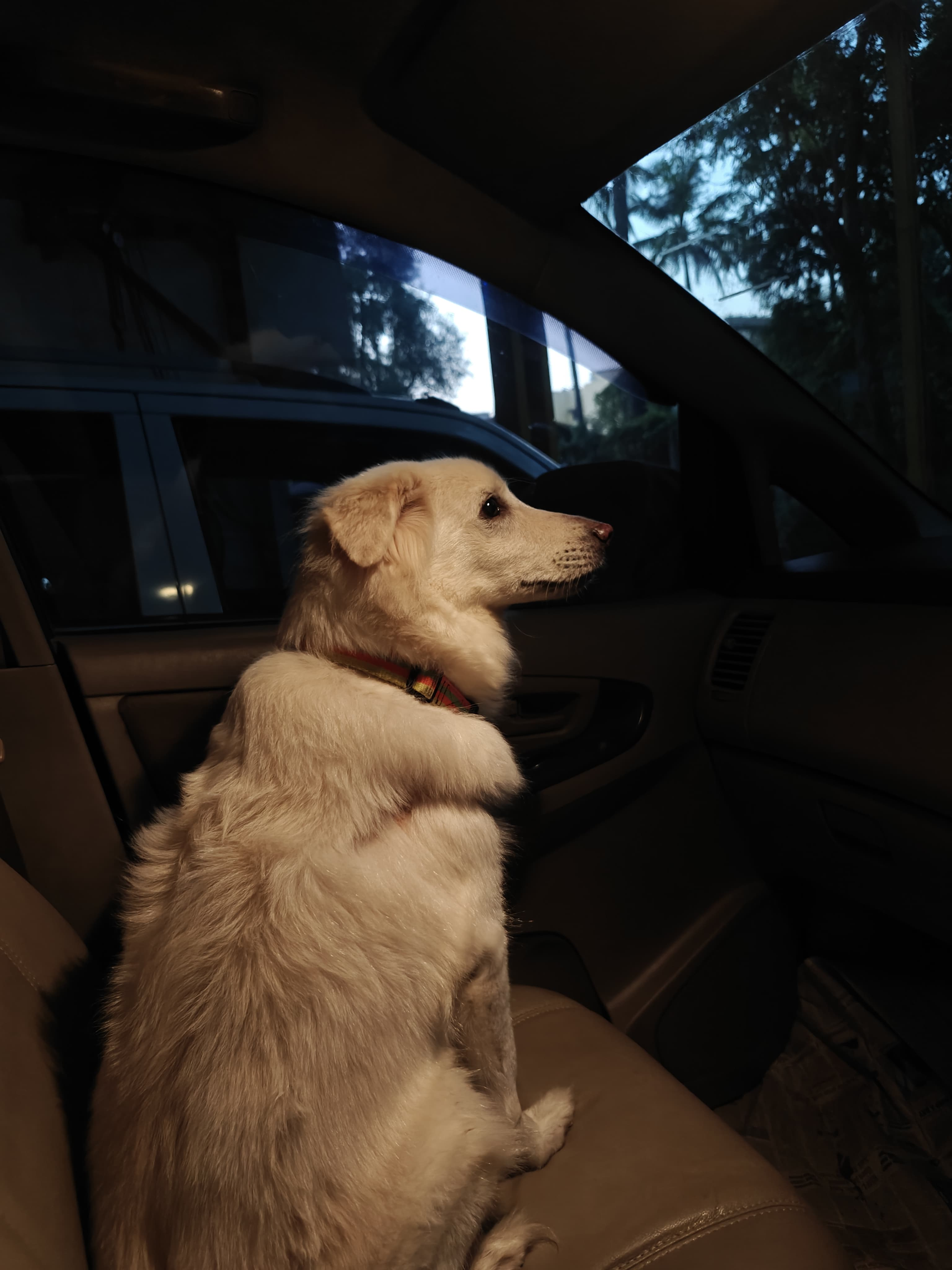
Although they are uncommon, certain Spitz may have drop ears.

=== Grooming ===
While this breed likes to keep themselves clean, they need regular brushing to keep their long coats in good condition. Their bath schedules can range from twice a month to once a month, since their fur can easily dry out if bathed too often.

Shedding is a problem with Indian Spitz, as their European heritage means they get rid of their thick winter coat in the warmer months, characteristic of many Spitz breeds such as the Japanese Spitz, the Pomeranian or the Samoyed. Their coats are double layered, so proper grooming requires a double-row brush to reach the undercoat. Being a dog with a double-layered coat, it is advised not to shave a matted Indian Spitz, as it can result in patchy hair growth.

== Differences between the Pomeranian and Indian Spitz ==
The Indian Spitz often gets mistaken for a Pomeranian, a related spitz from Pomerania. However, they are quite distinct: the Indian Spitz has a shorter coat and is bigger. They share a lot of physical characteristics because they are very closely related, being only a few hundred years apart in lineage. A Pomeranian has rounded ears, a flatter face, weighs less (should not exceed 3–4 kg), and has a thicker coat. The Indian Spitz is bigger and heavier compared to Pomeranian. In spite of these differences, in India most people refer to the Spitz as a Pomeranian.

Some of the basic differences are as follows:

- The Pomeranian is a Toy breed. It is lighter than even a Lesser Indian Spitz, both in height and weight, which typically weighs less than 10 pounds and is rarely over 12 inches in height.
- The Pomeranian has a much flatter face than an Indian Spitz, which has a more conical snout.
- The coat of a Pomeranian is generally denser and thicker. It is often difficult to see individual hairs. However, an Indian Spitz's coat is less dense and it is easier to see the individual hair follicles.
- The Pomeranian's ears are generally not as pointed or elongated as that of an Indian Spitz.

== Health ==
The Indian Spitz has a high risk of developing corneal ulceration.

== In popular culture ==
=== Famous Indian Spitz ===
Redo, the dog actor who played 'Tuffy' in the 1994 romantic comedy Hum Aapke Hain Koun, was an Indian Spitz. Redo died in 2000 at the age of 12.

== See also ==
- List of dog breeds
- List of dog breeds from India
