= Japanese Spitz =

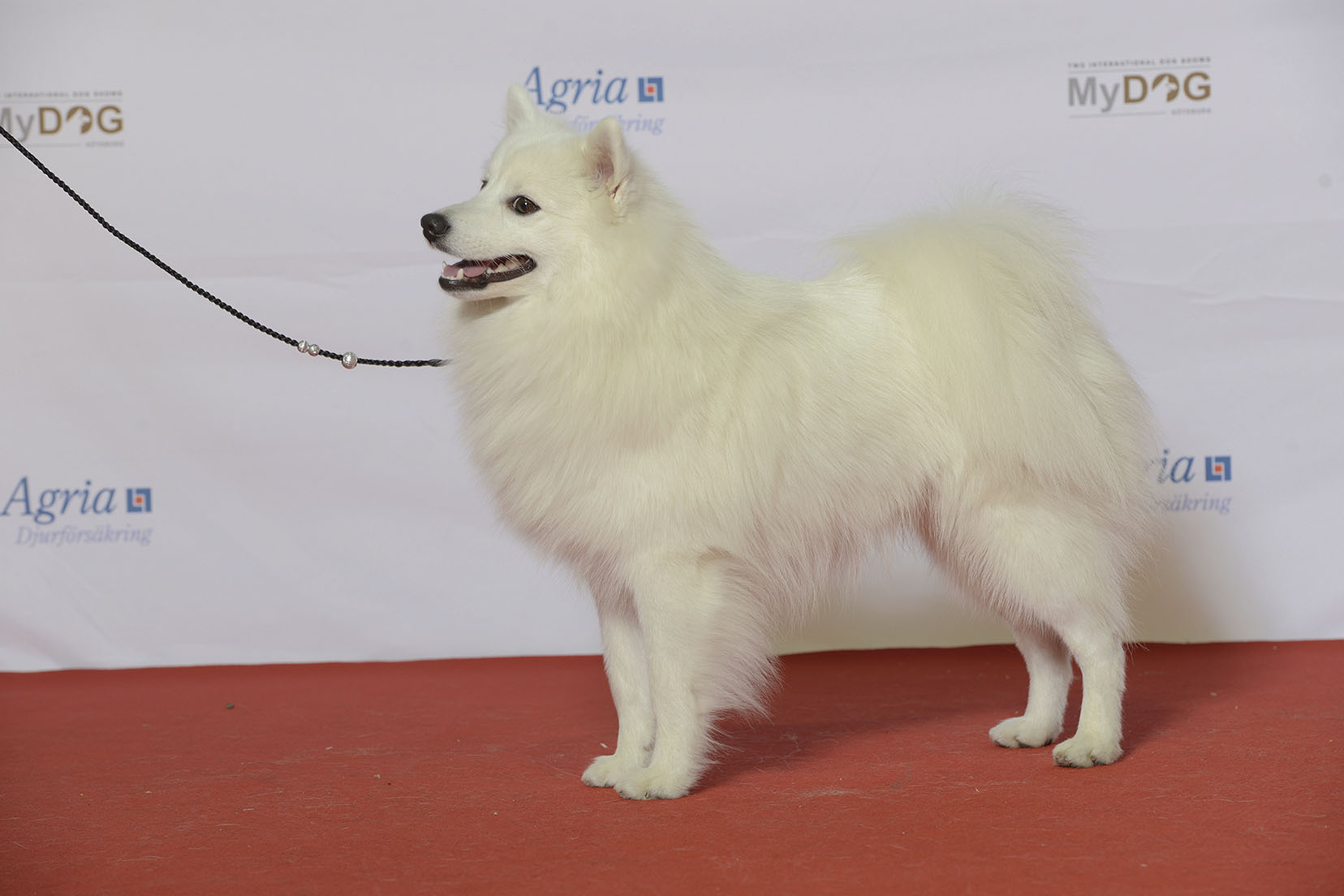
- Japanese Spitz
- Origin: Japan
Traits
- Coat: Double coat
- Colour: White
- Litter size: 1–8 puppies
Kennel club standards
- Japan Kennel Club: standard
- Fédération Cynologique Internationale: standard

The Japanese Spitz (日本スピッツ, Nihon Supittsu; Japanese pronunciation: [nʲippoɴ.sɯ̥ᵝpʲittsɯᵝ]) is a Japanese small to medium breed of dog of the Spitz type. There are varying standards around the world as to the ideal size of the breed, but they are always larger than their smaller cousins, the Pomeranian. They were developed in Japan in the 1920s and 1930s by breeding a number of other Spitz type dog breeds together, and are also one of the smallest native breeds, along with the Shiba Inu, Japanese Chin, and Japanese Terrier. They are recognized by the vast majority of the major kennel clubs, and while they are a relatively new breed, they are becoming widely popular due to their favorable temperament and other features.

The major health concern is patellar luxation, and a minor recurring concern is that the breed can be prone to runny eyes. They can act as reliable watchdogs, but are a type of companion dog and prefer to be an active part of the family. Although they might appear fluffy, they are a low maintenance breed as dirt does not stick to the coat.

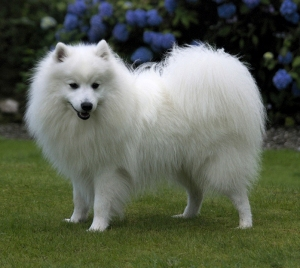
Male Japanese Spitz (UK)

The Japanese Spitz is a small dog, around 33 cm (13 in)s) at the withers, with a somewhat square body, deep chest, and a very thick, pure white double coat. The coat consists of an outer coat that stands off from the soft inner coat, with fur shorter on the muzzle and ears as well as the fronts of the forelegs and the hindlegs. A ruff of longer fur is around the dog's neck. It has a pointed muzzle and small, triangular shape prick ears (ears that stand up). The tail is long, heavily covered with long fur, and is carried curled over and lying on the dog's back. The white coat contrasts with the black pads and nails of the feet, the black nose, and the dark eyes. The large oval (akin to a ginkgo seed) eyes are dark and slightly slanted with white eyelashes, and the nose and lips and eye rims are black. The face of the Japanese Spitz is wedge-shaped.

They share a common resemblance with the white Pomeranian, Samoyed and American Eskimo Dog.

== Size variations ==
Description of the ideal size of the breed varies. In Japan, the ideal size for males are described as 30–38 cm at the withers, with females somewhat smaller; (the Japanese standard is the one published by the Fédération Cynologique Internationale for international dog competitions.) In the UK, the Kennel Club describes the size as 34–37 cm (13–15 in) at the withers with females 30–34 cm (12–13 in), which is the same for the Australian National Kennel Council. In New Zealand (New Zealand Kennel Club), the ideal size is 30–40 cm (12–16 in) for males, 25–35 cm (9.8–13.8 in) for females. The Canadian Kennel Club states that the size for dogs is 12 inches (30 cm) with females slightly smaller, and the United Kennel Club in the U.S. describes the ideal size as 12 to 15 in (30 to 38 cm) for males and 12 to 14 in (30 to 36 cm) for females. Minor kennel clubs and other organizations may use any of these ideal sizes or create their own. Japanese Spitzes are generally considered larger than their cousin, the Pomeranian.

== History ==
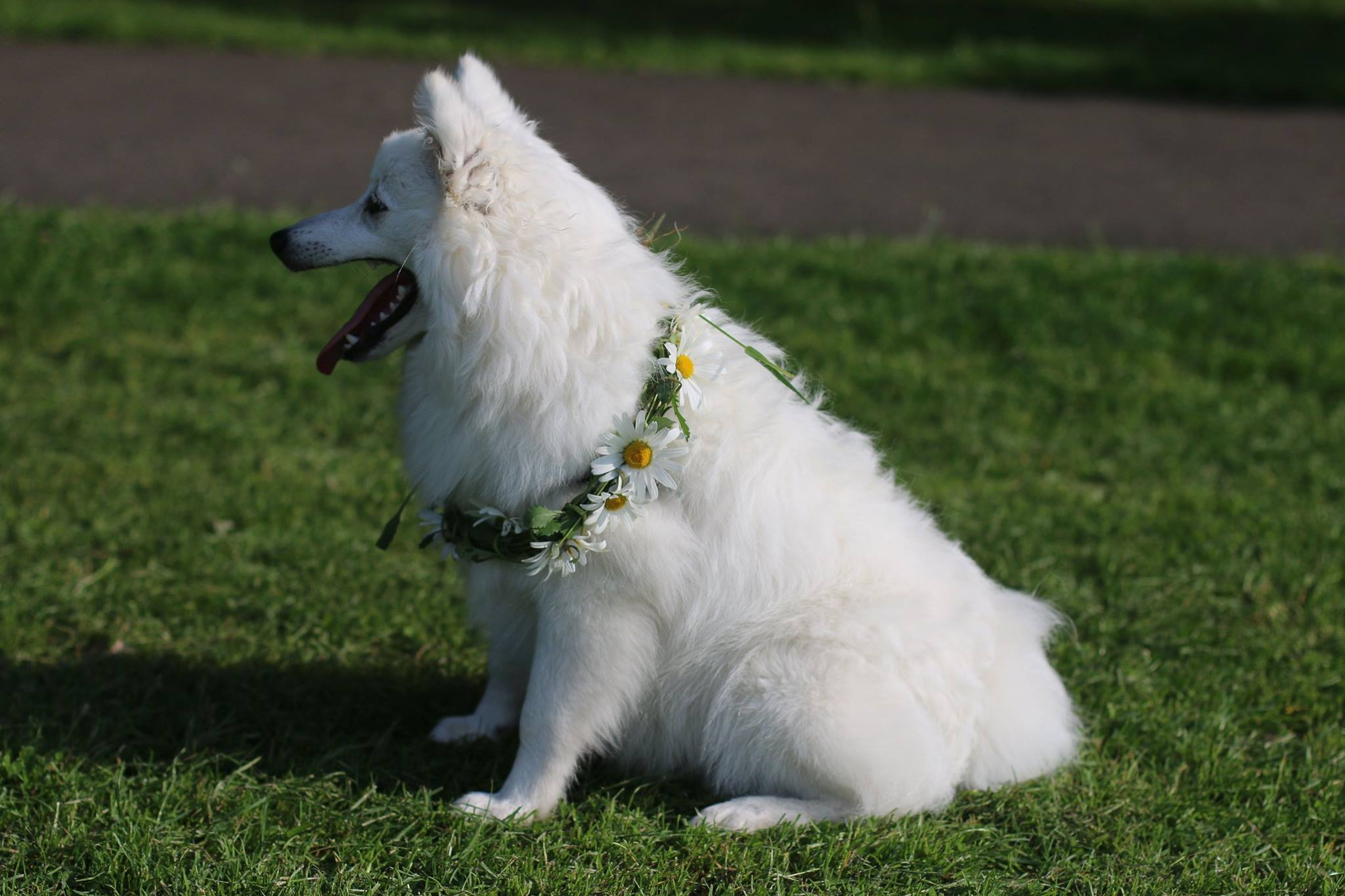
A female Japanese Spitz

Dog breeders in Japan in the 1920s and 1930s created the Japanese Spitz by crossbreeding a number of other Spitz breeds to develop the Japanese Spitz. Breeders began with white German Spitz dogs, originally brought over from northeastern China to Japan; they were first exhibited at a dog show in Tokyo in 1921. Between 1925 and 1936 various small white Spitz breeds were imported from around the world and crossed into the developing breed, with the goal of producing an improved breed. The final Standard for the breed was written after World War II, and accepted by the Japan Kennel Club. The breed gained popularity in Japan in the 1950s, and was exported to Sweden in the early 1950s. From there the breed went to England, and the Kennel Club recognized the Japanese Spitz in 1977 in the Utility Group. The Japanese Spitz has spread around the world including to Australia, India, and the United States and is recognized by most of the major kennel clubs in the English speaking world; by the Canadian Kennel Club in Group 6, Non-Sporting, by the New Zealand Kennel Club (Non-Sporting Group), by the Australian National Kennel Council in Group 7 (Non Sporting), and by the United Kennel Club (U.S.) in the Northern Breeds Group. In April 2019, the American Kennel Club added Japanese Spitz breed to Foundation Stock Service that means is yet to be recognized by the AKC. The breed is also recognized by minor registries and clubs.

== Health ==
They are a healthy breed with very few genetic problems. The main health concern for Japanese Spitz is the development of Patellar luxation, a condition in which the kneecap dislocates out of its normal position. They can also be prone to runny eyes, which is most commonly due to having tear ducts that are too small, or an allergy to long grass or stress. It is rarely caused by any serious eye defect.

Progressive retinal atrophy of the rcd4 type (PRA-rcd4), a late-onset inherited eye disease, has also been identified in the breed.

=== Life expectancy ===
A 2024 UK study found a life expectancy of 13 years for the breed compared to an average of 12.7 for purebreeds and 12 for crossbreeds.

=== Temperament ===
The Japanese Spitz is considered one of the more active, loyal, playful, or intelligent dog breeds. They have a tendency to bark to warn of arriving strangers, making them a common choice as watchdogs, despite their relatively small size. The Japanese Spitz commonly acts as a companion dog and thrives on human contact and attention, preferring to be a member of the family, a common choice for older people and small children. They enjoy being active and outdoors.

== Care ==
Japanese Spitz can tolerate cold weather but, as it was bred as a companion dog, prefers to live in the house with the warmth of its human family. Though they can live in apartments, they need some time running around outside off-leash in a safe environment.

=== Grooming ===
Due to the texture of their coat, mud and dirt falls off or can be brushed out very easily. However, due to the breed's thick coat, regular brushing is essential.

The Japanese Spitz's coat is relatively dry as compared to other breeds. Their coat should be groomed twice a week using a pin brush that reaches to the undercoat, preventing formation of knots. Grooming this breed is relatively easy in contrast to other dog breeds. Their white fur coat has a non-stick texture often described as being similar to Teflon.

== Gallery ==
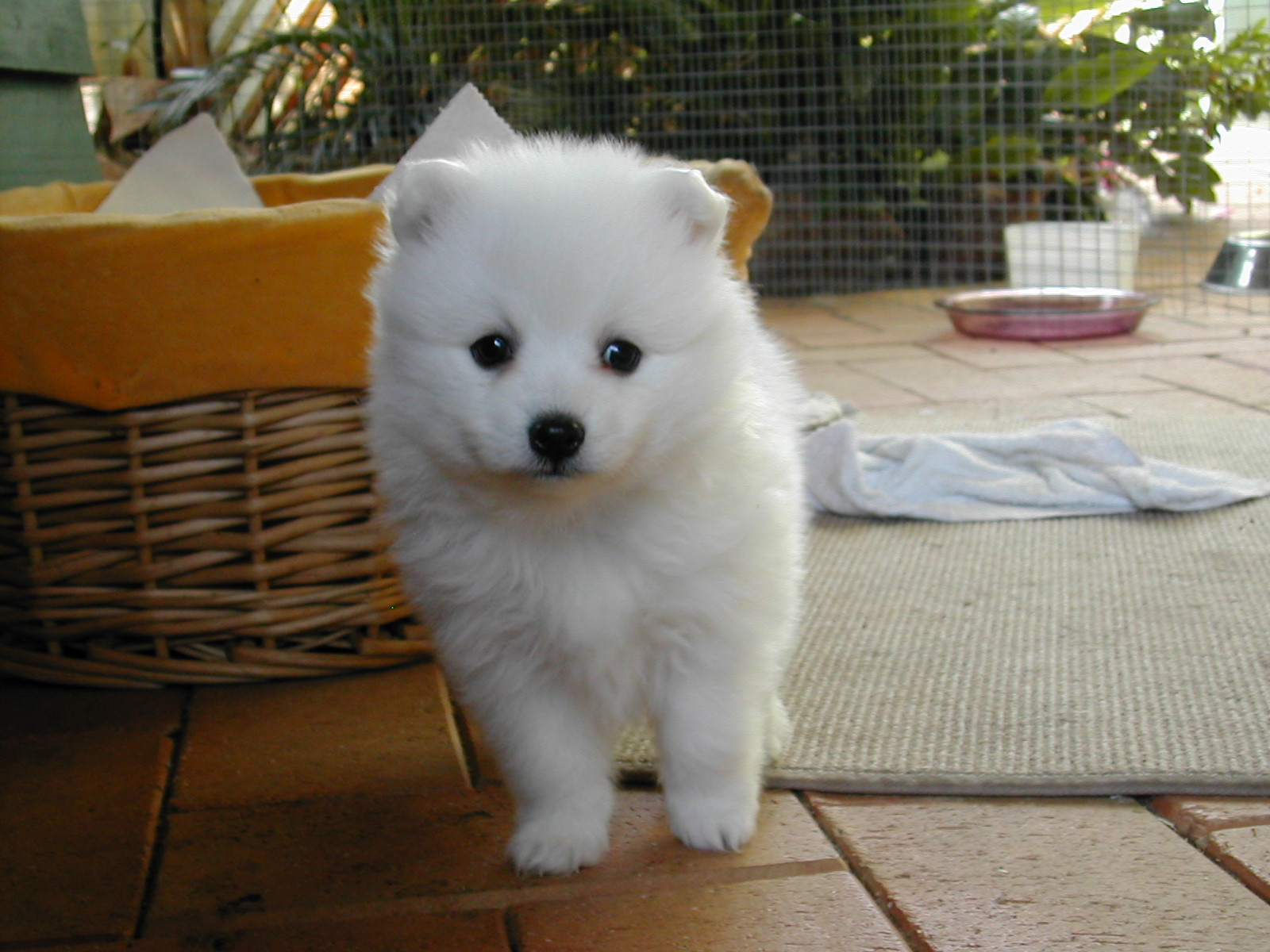
Japanese Spitz puppy

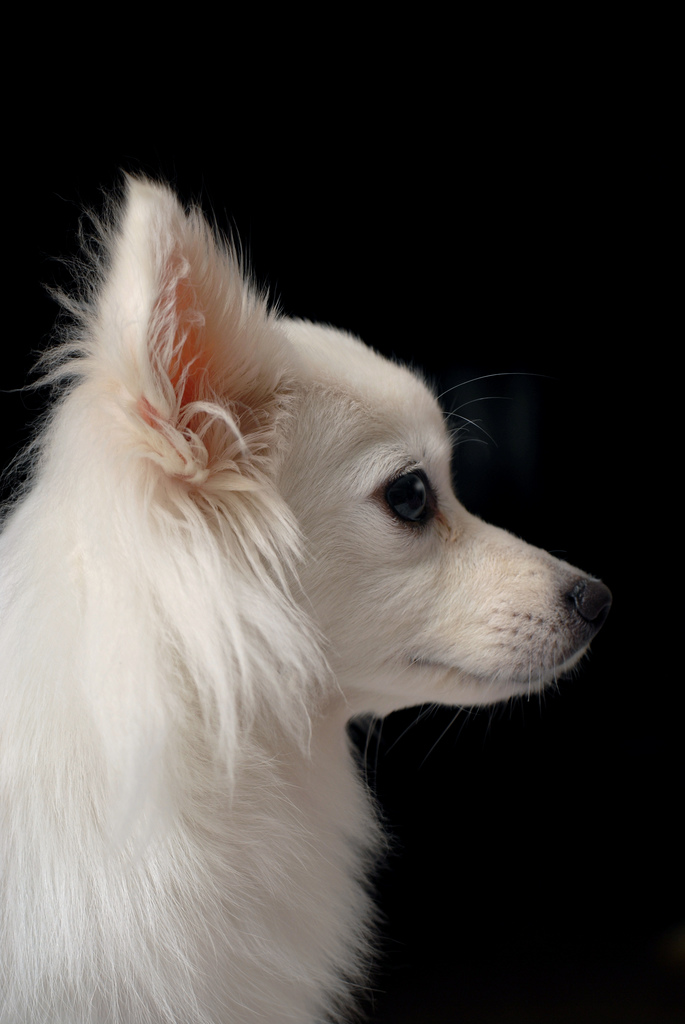
Profile of a Japanese Spitz

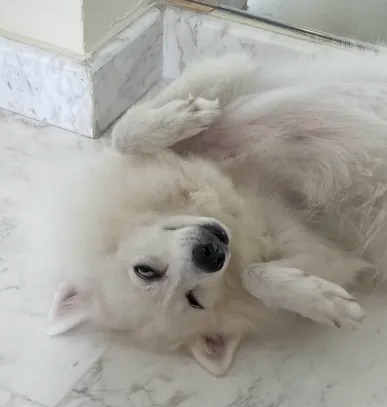
A 10 Year Old Japanese Spitz Lying Down

== See also ==
- List of dog breeds
