= Volpino Italiano =

Italian breed of dog

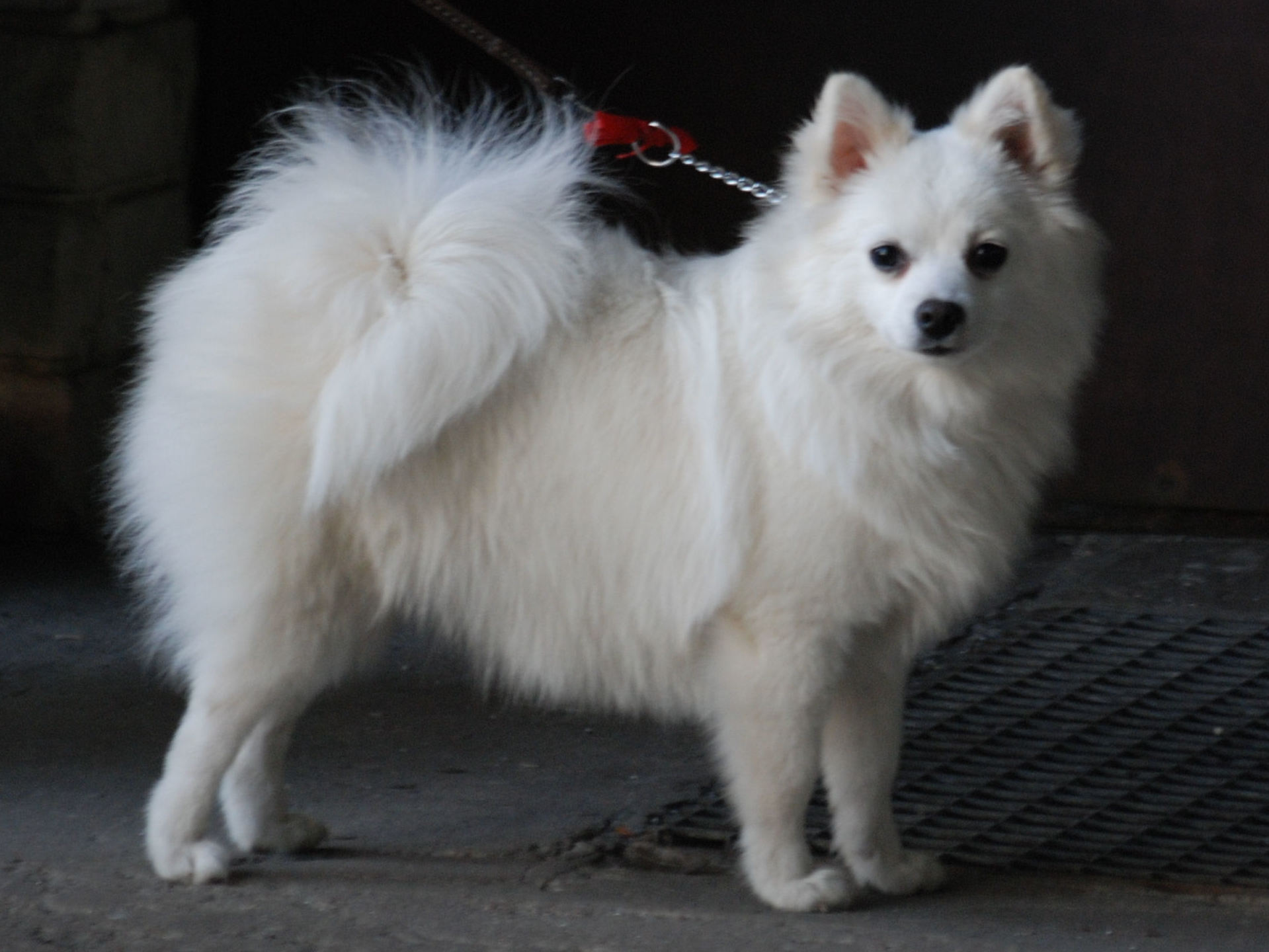
- Other names: Volpino; Cane del Quirinale; Cane di Firenze
- Origin: Italy
Traits
Height	Males	27–30 cm
	Females	25–28 cm
- Coat: long
- Colour: solid white, red or black any other colour is accepted as well
Kennel club standards
- Ente Nazionale della Cinofilia Italiana: standard
- Fédération Cynologique Internationale: standard

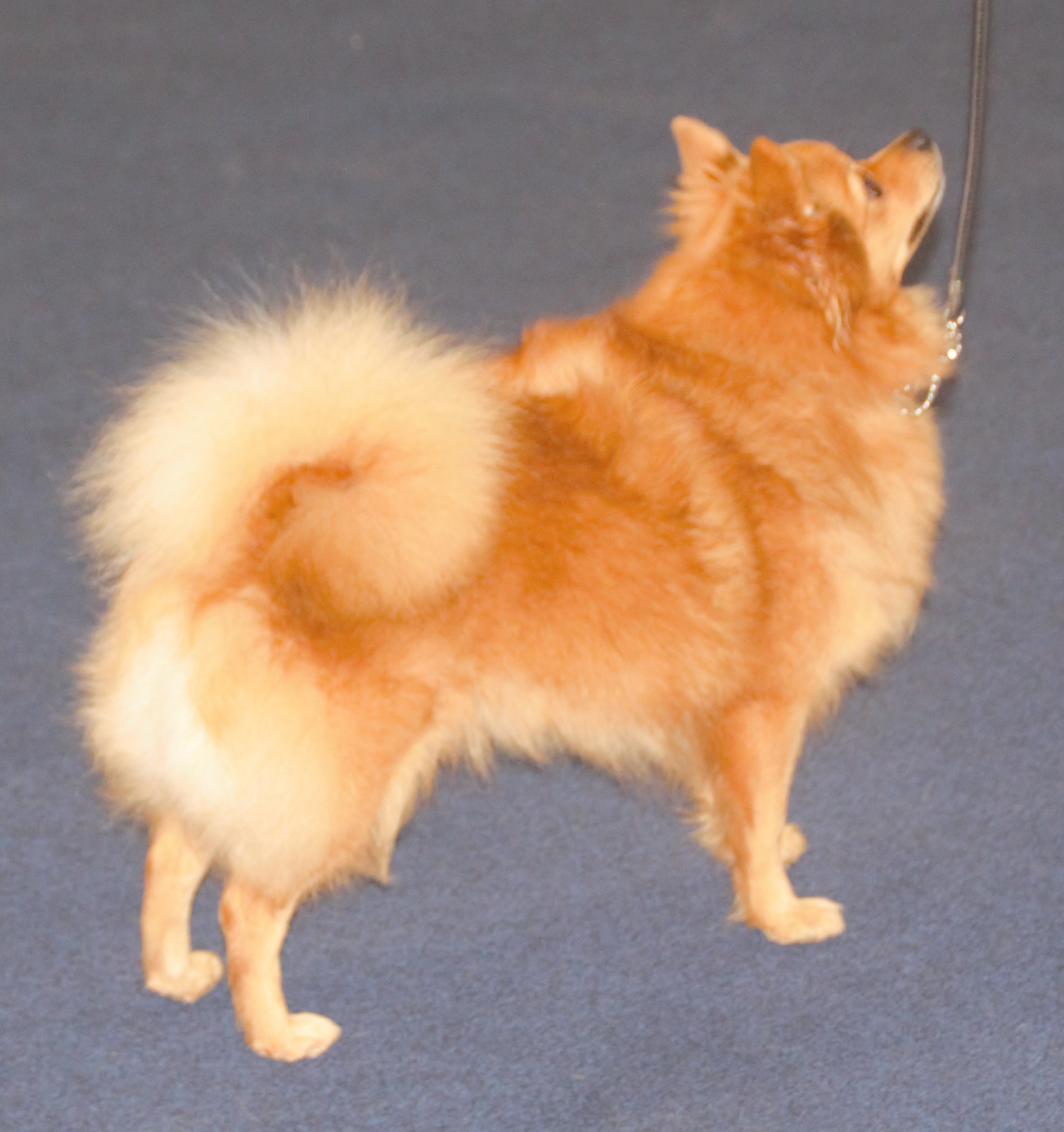
A red individual

The Volpino Italiano (Note: Italian pronunciation: [volˈpiːno itaˈljaːno], plural Volpini; literally, "Italian foxy [dog]") or Volpino is an Italian breed of dog of Spitz type. It is closely related to the Pomeranian and to the German Spitz.

== History ==
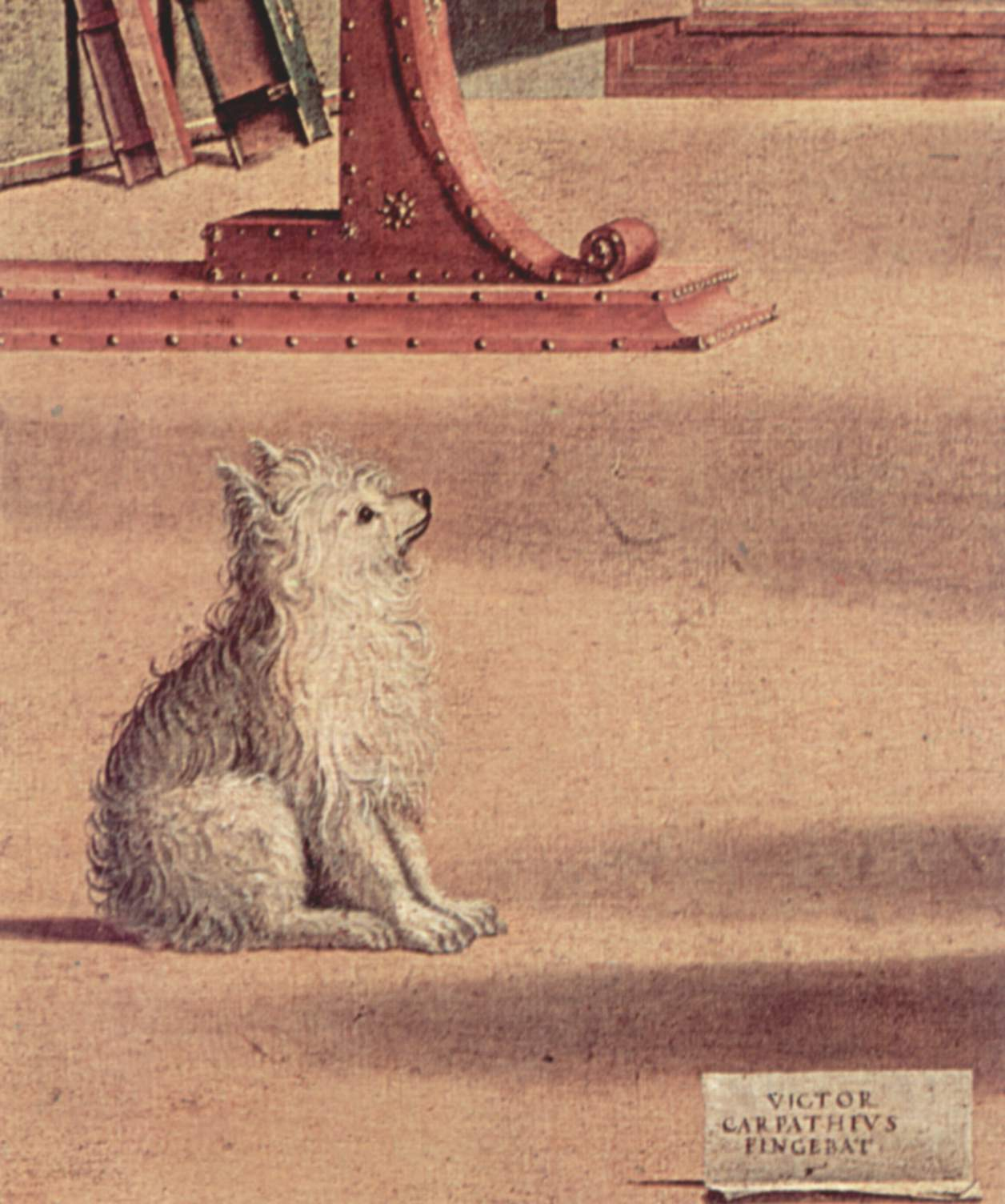
Detail of St. Augustine in His Study (1502) by Vittore Carpaccio, in the Scuola di San Giorgio degli Schiavoni in Venice

Small Spitz-type dogs resembling the modern Volpino have been identified in a number of paintings, of which the earliest may be St. Augustine in His Study by Vittore Carpaccio, painted in the Scuola di San Giorgio degli Schiavoni in Venice in 1502.

In the eighteenth and nineteenth centuries this type of dog was common in Tuscany, where it was known as the Cane di Firenze and was used as a guard dog by carters and shepherds, and in Lazio, where it was called the Cane del Quirinale.

Queen Victoria of the United Kingdom visited Florence in 1888, and bought four dogs of Pomeranian or Spitz type.

The first standard for the Volpino Italiano was drawn up by the Kennel Club Italiano in 1913, and the dogs were shown with some success. It was fully accepted by the Fédération Cynologique Internationale in 1956. By the 1960s the breed had virtually disappeared, and was close to extinction. A few examples were identified in 1968, and registrations recommenced in 1972.

In the period from 2011 to 2019, new registrations in Italy averaged about 160 per year.

== Characteristics ==
The Volpino is a small dog, standing no more than about 30 cm at the withers. It is roughly square in outline, the body length more or less equal to the height. The coat is long and stands away from the body. It is either solid white, solid deep red or black; however, in the updated breed standard, also any other colour is accepted/tolerated.

It is one of many breeds affected by hereditary primary lens luxation, an eye disease which may cause pain or blindness.
