= Spitz =

Dog type

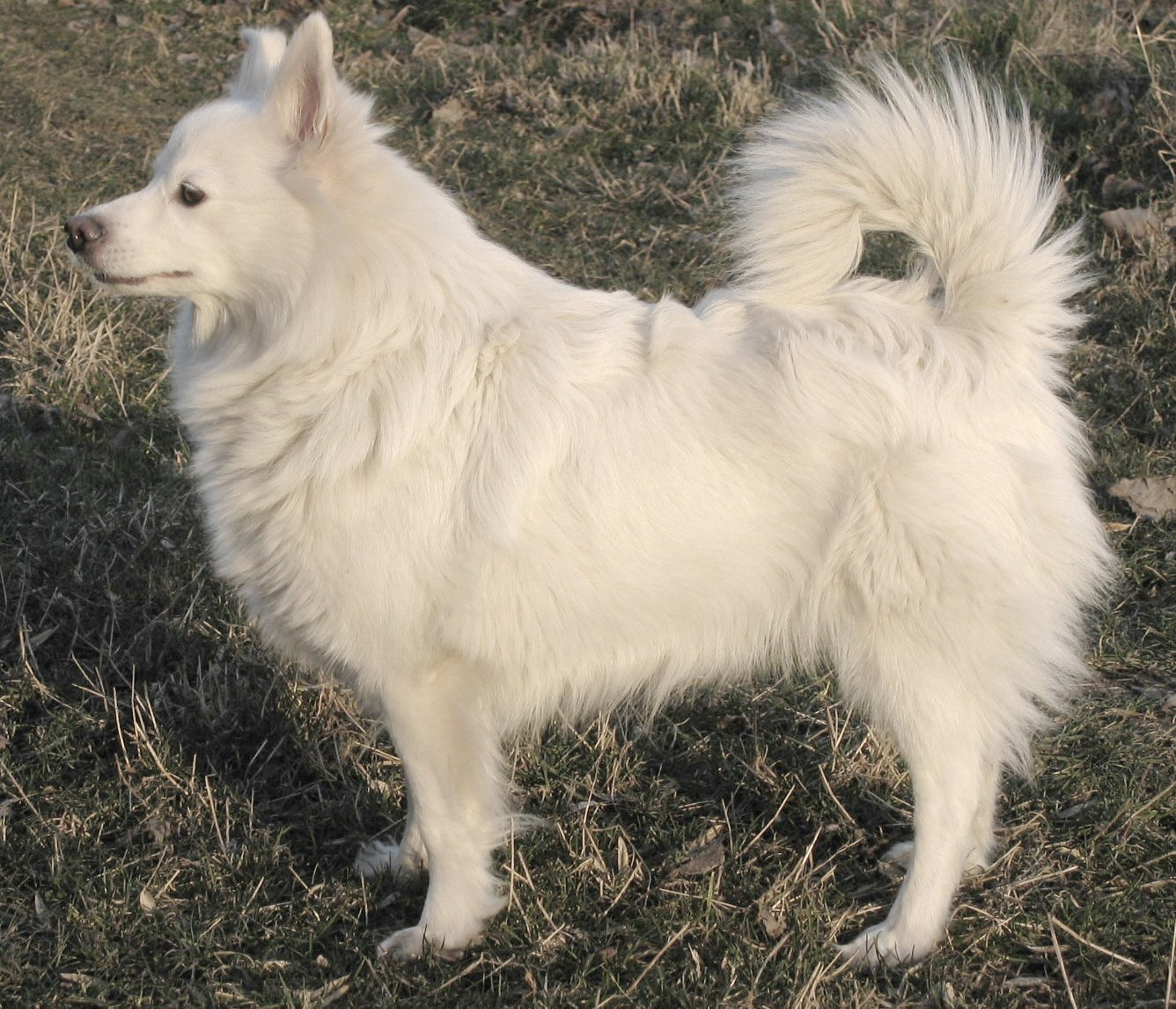
A German Spitz

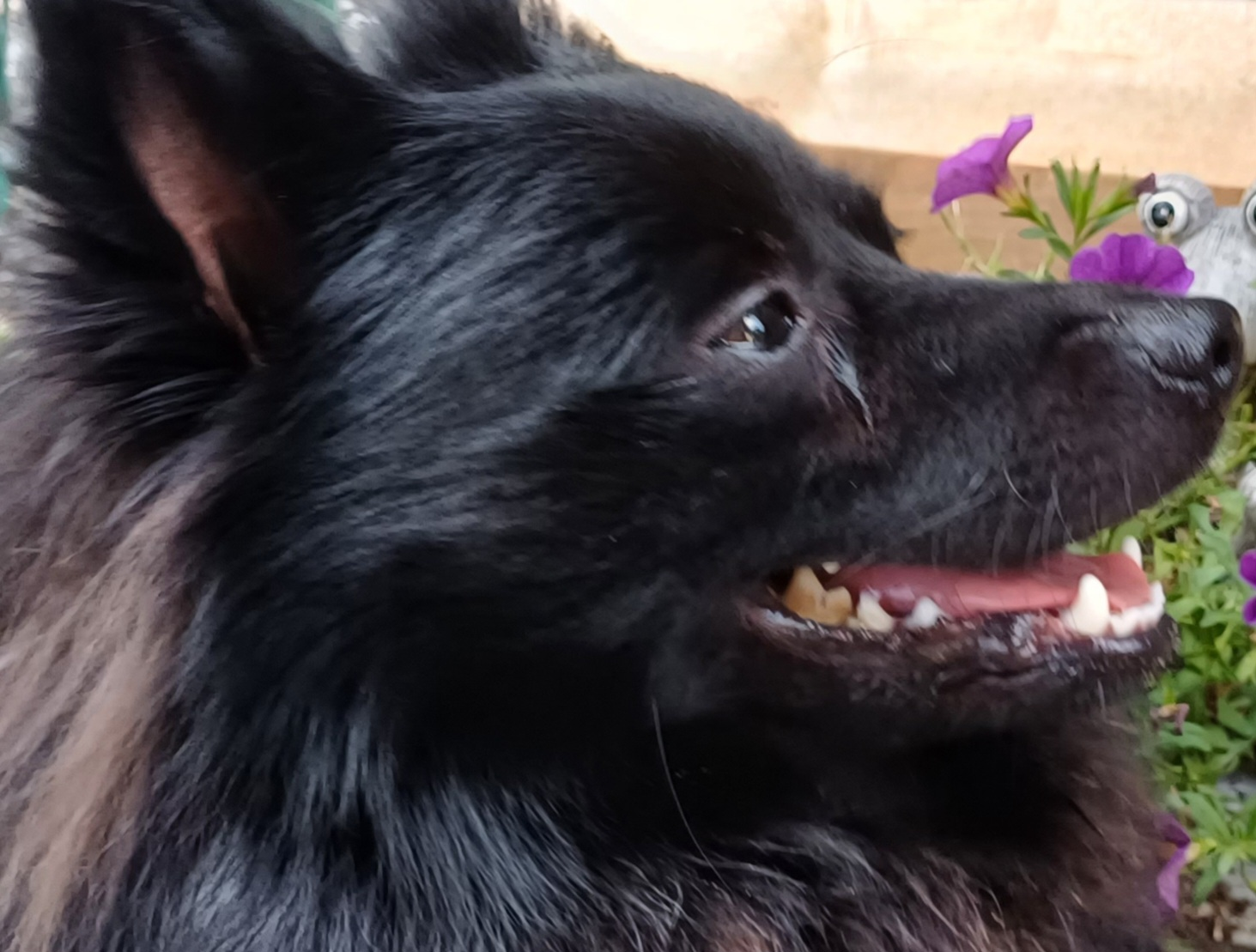
Profile view of a Mittelspitz's face

The spitz (pronounced [ʃpɪts]) is a type of domestic dog including between 50 and 70 breeds depending on classification. There is no precise definition of the type, but most spitz breeds have pricked ears, almond-shaped eyes, a pointed muzzle, a double coat, and a tail that curves over the back. The name derives from the German Spitz(hund), meaning "pointed (dog)", in reference to the shape of the muzzle.

Most of the spitzes seen today originate from the Arctic region or from Siberia. Johann Friedrich Gmelin described the type as Canis pomeranus in his 1788 revision of Systema Naturae.

== History ==
Dogs of spitz type have been depicted on the tombs of the 4th dynasty of Egypt. Toy dogs of spitz type have been depicted since 500 B.C. in Ancient Greek pottery.

== Characteristics ==
Spitzes are well suited to living in harsh northern climates. They often have an insulating, waterproof undercoat that is denser than the topcoat to trap warmth. Small, upright ears help to reduce the risk of frostbite, square proportions and thick fur that grows on the paws protects the dogs from sharp ice. Many spitz breeds, like the Japanese Akita and Chow Chow, retain wolf-like characteristics such as independence, suspiciousness, and aggression towards unfamiliar humans and other dogs, and they require much training and socialization when they are puppies before they become manageable in an urban environment. Some, such as the Karelian Bear Dog, are more difficult to train as companion dogs. Some breeds, such as the Pomeranian, have manes. Several spitz breeds (such as huskies) are bred for one purpose only. However it is common for many spitz breeds (such as the Russian laikas) to be general purpose dogs in their native lands, used for hunting, hauling, herding, and guarding. Smaller breeds have faces that resemble fox faces, while larger breeds have faces that resemble wolf faces.

== Companions and toys ==
Some spitzes, with their thick fur, fluffy ruffs, curled tails, "smiling" mouths and small muzzles and ears, have been bred into non-working dogs designed to be companions or lap dogs. This trend is most evident in the tiny Pomeranian, which was originally a much larger dog closer to the size of a Keeshond before being bred down to make an acceptable court animal.

The Keeshond, the Wolfspitz variety of the German Spitz, is a generally affectionate, loyal, and very energetic pet that, while originally bred as a watchdog for barges (hence the name Dutch Barge Dog), has been further selected to be a companion animal. Other spitzes that have been bred away from working uses are the American Eskimo Dog, Alaskan Klee Kai, German Spitz, Volpino Italiano and Japanese Spitz.

== See also ==
- Nureongi – the spitz-like dog bred for meat in the Korean peninsula.
