= German Spitz =

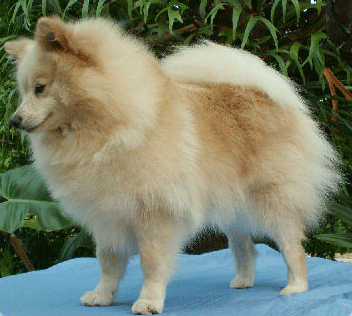
- A cream-coloured German Standard Spitz (Mittelspitz)
- Other names: German: Deutscher Spitz
- Origin: Germany
Kennel club standards
- VDH: standard
- Fédération Cynologique Internationale: standard

Wolfsspitz
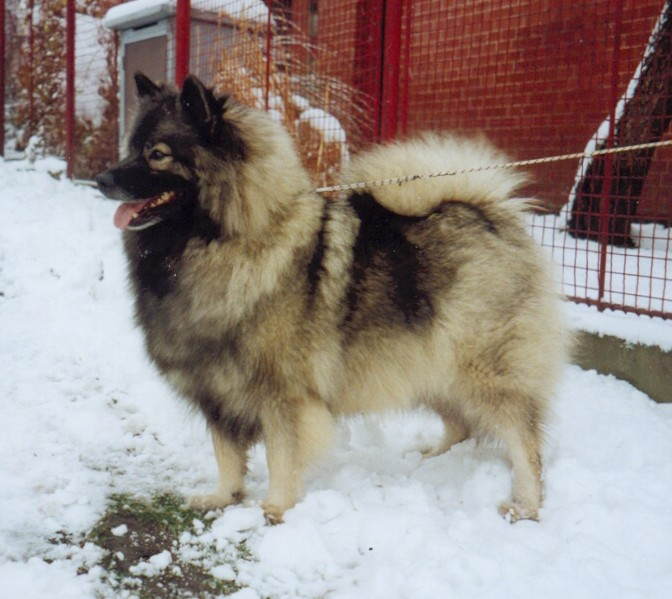
- Other names: Keeshond
Traits
- Height: 43–55 cm (17–22 in)
- Weight: 15–20 kg (33–44 lb)
- Coat: Double coat, long straight outer and thick cotton-wool like undercoat
- Colour: Grey-shaded

German Giant Spitz
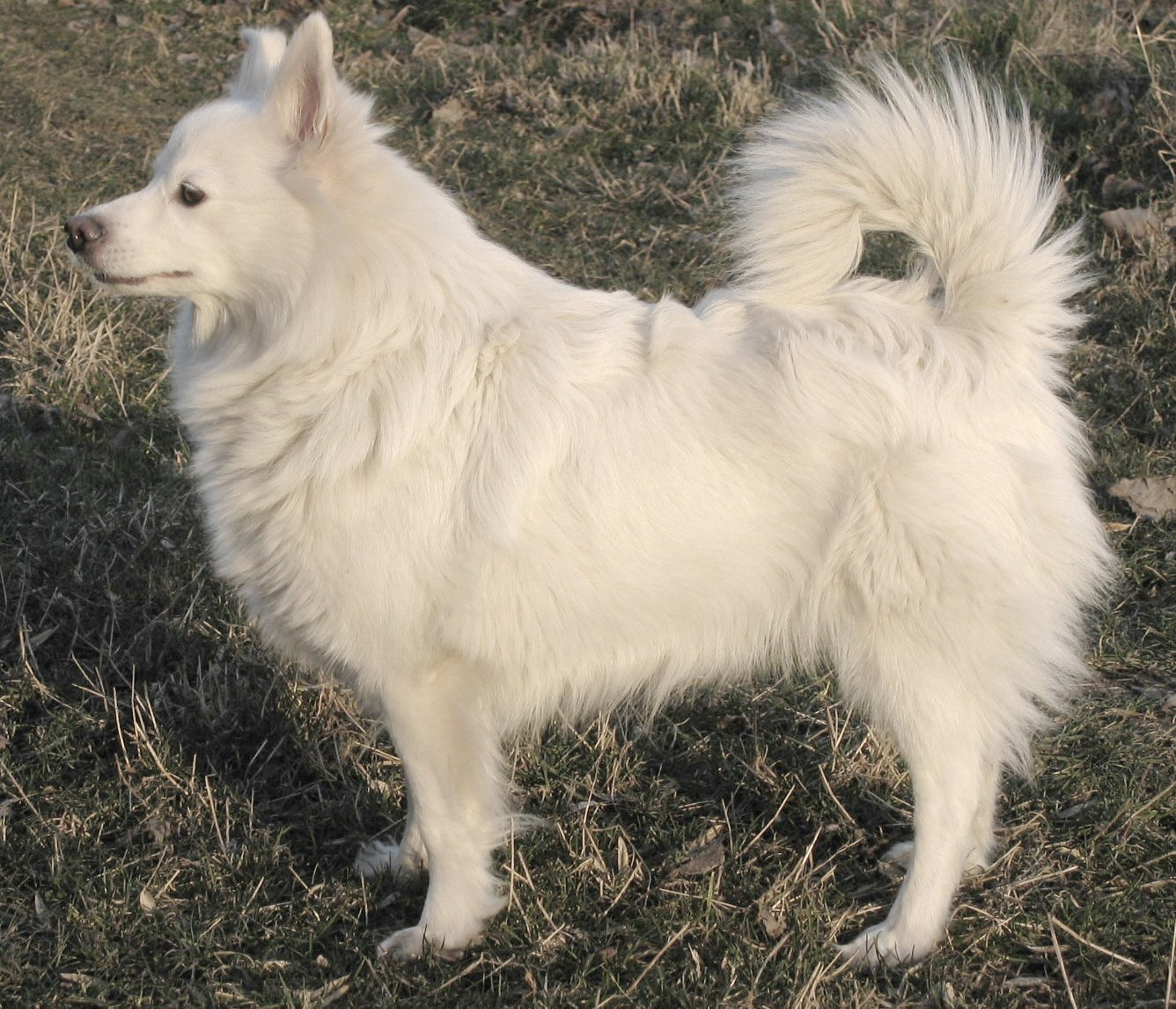
- Other names: German: Großspitz
Traits
- Height: 40–50 cm (16–20 in)
- Weight: 17–18 kg (37–40 lb)
- Coat: Double coat, long straight outer and thick cotton-wool like undercoat
- Colour: White, black and brown, sometimes with white spots on the chest, paws and tip of tail

German Medium Spitz
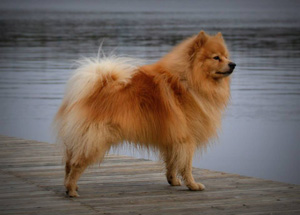
- Other names: German: Mittelspitz
Traits
- Height: 30–40 cm (12–16 in)
- Weight: 11–12 kg (24–26 lb)
- Coat: Double coat, long straight outer and thick cotton-wool like undercoat
- Colour: White, black, brown, orange, grey-shaded and other colours

German Miniature Spitz
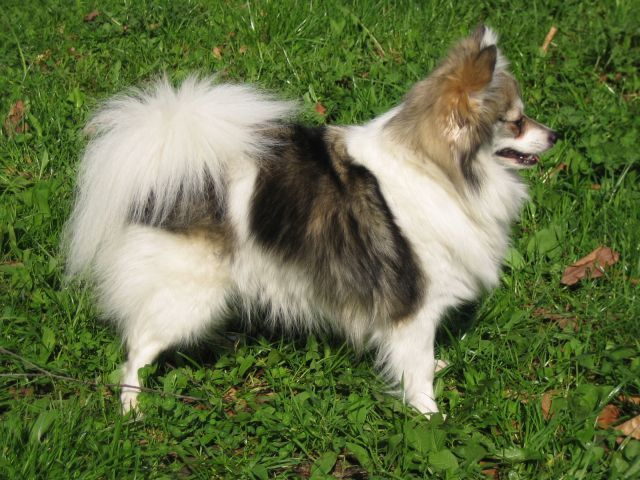
- Other names: German: Kleinspitz
Traits
- Height: 24–30 cm (9.4–11.8 in)
- Weight: 8–10 kg (18–22 lb)
- Coat: Double coat, long straight outer and thick cotton-wool like undercoat
- Colour: White, black, brown, orange, grey-shaded and other colours

Pomeranian
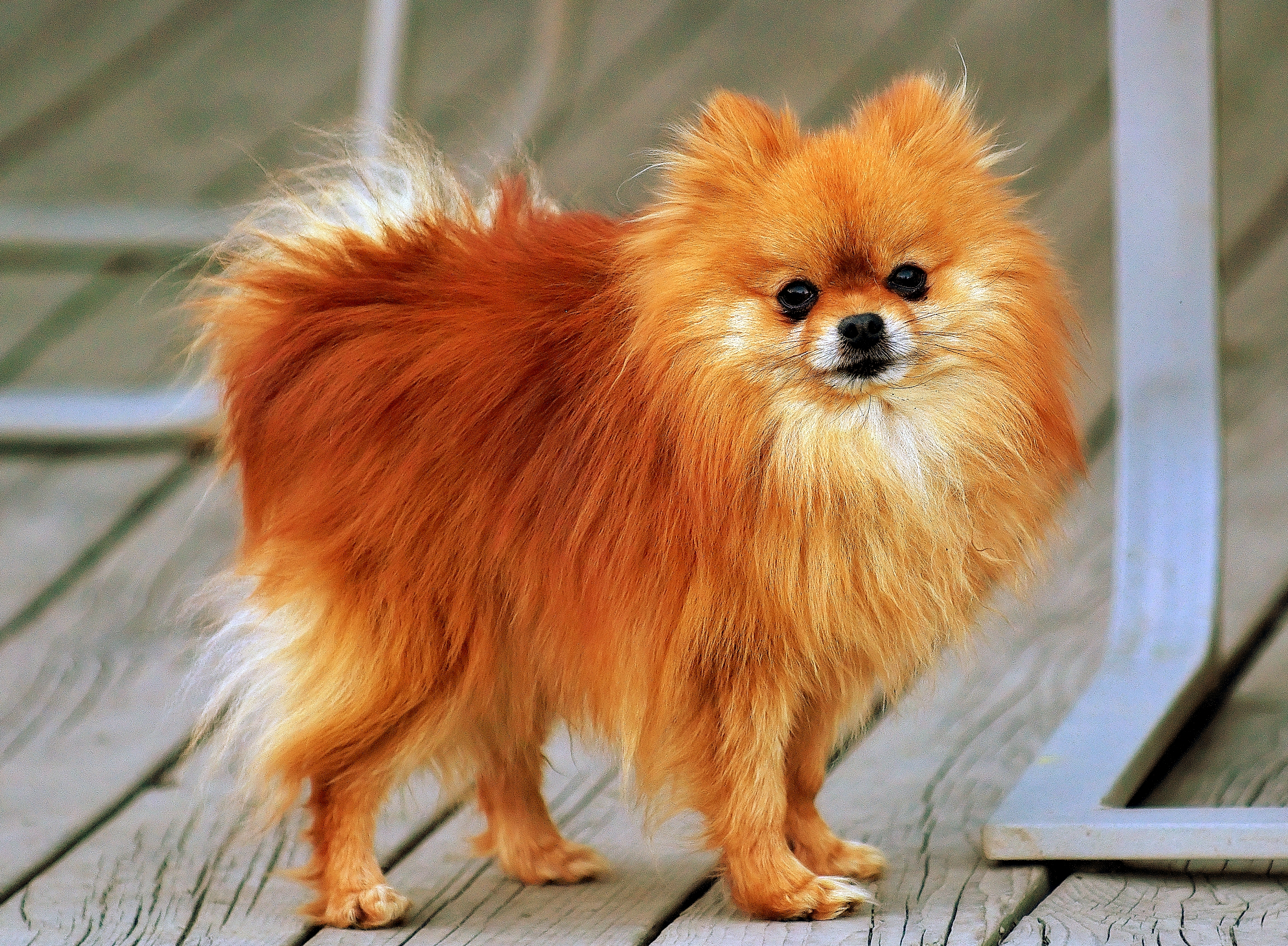
- Other names: German: Zwergspitz; German Toy Spitz
Traits
- Height: 18–24 cm (7.1–9.4 in)
- Weight: 2–3 kg (4.4–6.6 lb)
- Coat: Double coat, long straight outer and thick cotton-wool like undercoat
- Colour: White, black, brown, orange, grey-shaded and other colours

The German Spitz (German: Deutscher Spitz) is a breed of spitz-type dogs from Germany. It is considered a single breed, with five distinct varieties based on size and colour: the Wolfsspitz/Keeshond, the Giant Spitz or Großspitz, the Medium Spitz or Mittelspitz, the Miniature Spitz or Kleinspitz and the Pomeranian or Zwergspitz ("Dwarf Spitz").

== History ==
The earliest mentions of these spitz dogs in German literature date from AD 1450. In 1750, Count Eberhand zu Sayre Buffon wrote in his National history of quadrupeds that spitz dogs were the ancestor of all German breeds at that time.

German Spitz dogs were originally kept on farms for a number of roles including herding and guarding. As the centuries progressed some lines were bred to be smaller for other duties and eventually as small companion dogs.

== Description ==
The German Spitz is a long-haired, double-coated breed of spitz-type dog; the five varieties vary significantly in size. The breed standard states all variants have a double coat with a long, straight outer coat and a short, thick, cotton-wool like undercoat.

=== Wolfsspitz/Keeshond ===
The Wolfsspitz/Keeshond is the largest variety of Deutscher Spitz, standing some 43 to 55 cm (17 to 22 in) at the withers according to the breed standard. The coat is silver-grey with black shading. In some English-speaking countries – including Canada, the United Kingdom and the United States – the Keeshond and the German Wolfspitz are classed as two separate breeds; weights may be in the range 27 to 32 kg (60 to 70 lb) for the German Wolfspitz and 25 to 30 kg (55 to 65 lb) for the Keeshond.

=== Giant Spitz ===
The Giant Spitz is a medium-sized dog. It usually weighs 17 to 18 kg (37 to 40 lb) and according to the breed standard stands 43 to 55 cm (17 to 22 in); the coat can be white, black or brown. Black and brown animals can have white spots on the chest, paws and tip of tail.

=== Medium Spitz ===
The Medium Spitz is a medium-sized dog. It usually weighs 10.5 to 11.5 kg (23 to 25 lb) and according to the breed standard stands 30 to 40 cm (12 to 16 in); the coat can be white, black, brown, orange, grey-shaded and other colours - as well as mixes thereof.

=== Miniature Spitz ===
The Miniature Spitz is a small dog. It usually weighs 3 to 5 kg (7 to 11 lb) and according to the breed standard stands 24 to 30 cm (9 to 12 in); the coat can be white, black, brown, orange, grey-shaded and other colours.

=== Pomeranian ===
The Pomeranian (or Zwergspitz, "Dwarf Spitz") is a small dog. It usually weighs 1.4 to 3 kg (3 to 7 lb) and according to the breed standard stands 18 to 24 cm (7 to 9 in); the coat can be white, black, brown, orange, grey-shaded and other colours.
