= Hunt terrier =

Type of terrier dog

Hunt Terrier (not "hunting terrier") refers to types of terrier dogs that were attached to British "hunts", horse-oriented social clubs devoted to chasing the red fox on horseback, following packs of hounds. The hunt terrier was kept for a variety of reasons, such as rat control around stables and kennels, and to run with the hounds to flush the fox from small hiding places. It might also be expected to flush foxes from underground dens ("going to earth" like a working terrier), or to act as a lurcher. They tended to be white in colour so as to be more easily seen by the hunter, but they could be any colour.

Where hunts and fox hunting remain legal today, such as in the United States, terriers are little used. Breeds refined from Hunt terriers, such as the Fox Terrier and Jack Russell Terrier, are kept today as pets and showdogs, or, if small enough, as working terriers.

== Some breeds derived from hunt terriers ==
- Border Terrier
- Chilean Terrier
- Hunt Terrier (American)
- Jack Russell Terrier
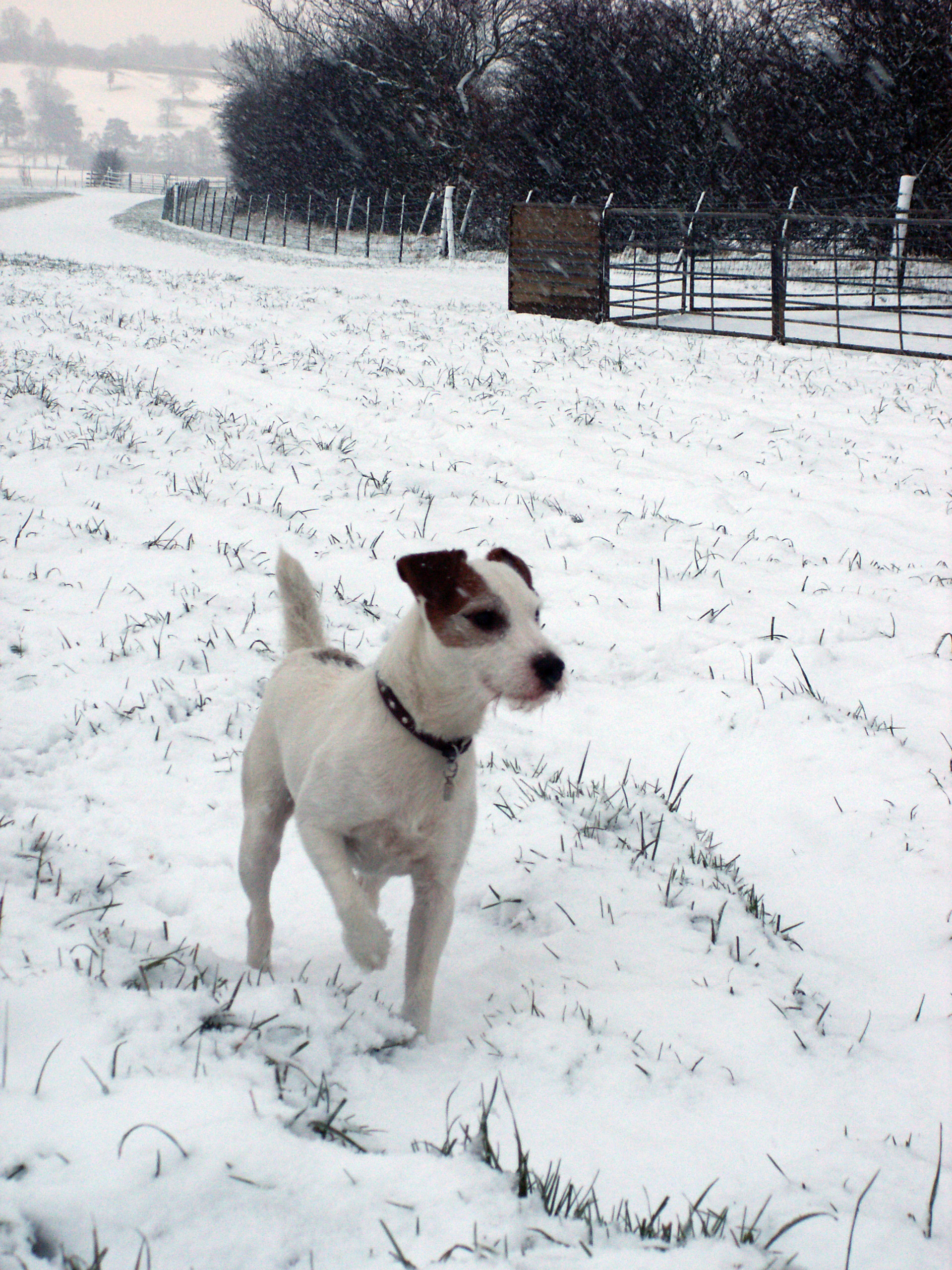
  Jack Russell Terrier Dog in snow
- Japanese Terrier
- Miniature Fox Terrier
- Parson Russell Terrier
- Plummer Terrier
- Rat Terrier
- Ratonero Bodeguero Andaluz
- Russell Terrier
- Smooth Fox Terrier
- Tenterfield Terrier
- Terrier Brasileiro
- Toy Fox Terrier
- Wire Fox Terrier

== See also ==
- Working terrier
- Fox hunting
- Fell Terrier
