= Fox Terrier =

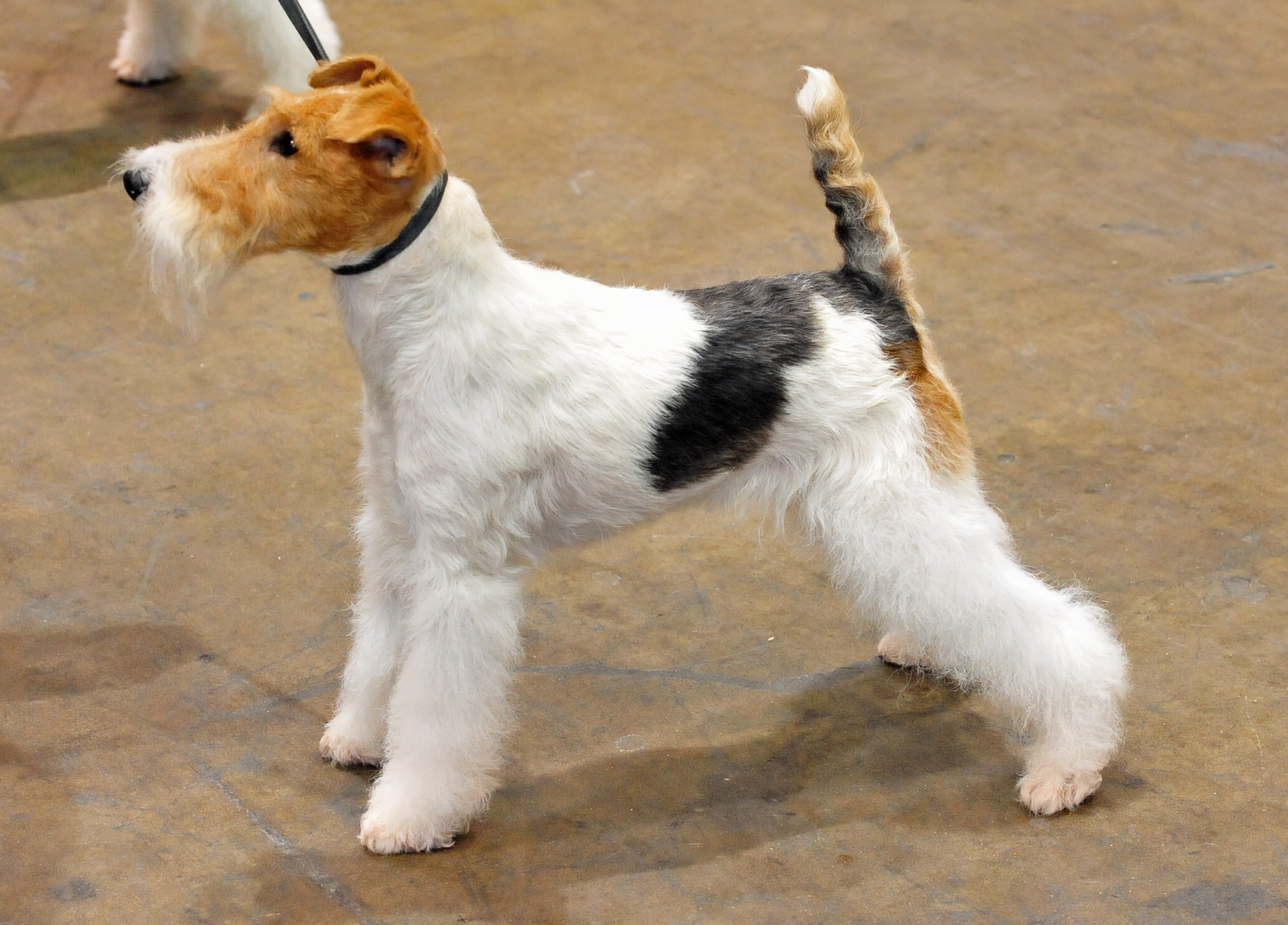
- Other names: Smooth Fox Terrier; Wire Fox Terrier
- Origin: England

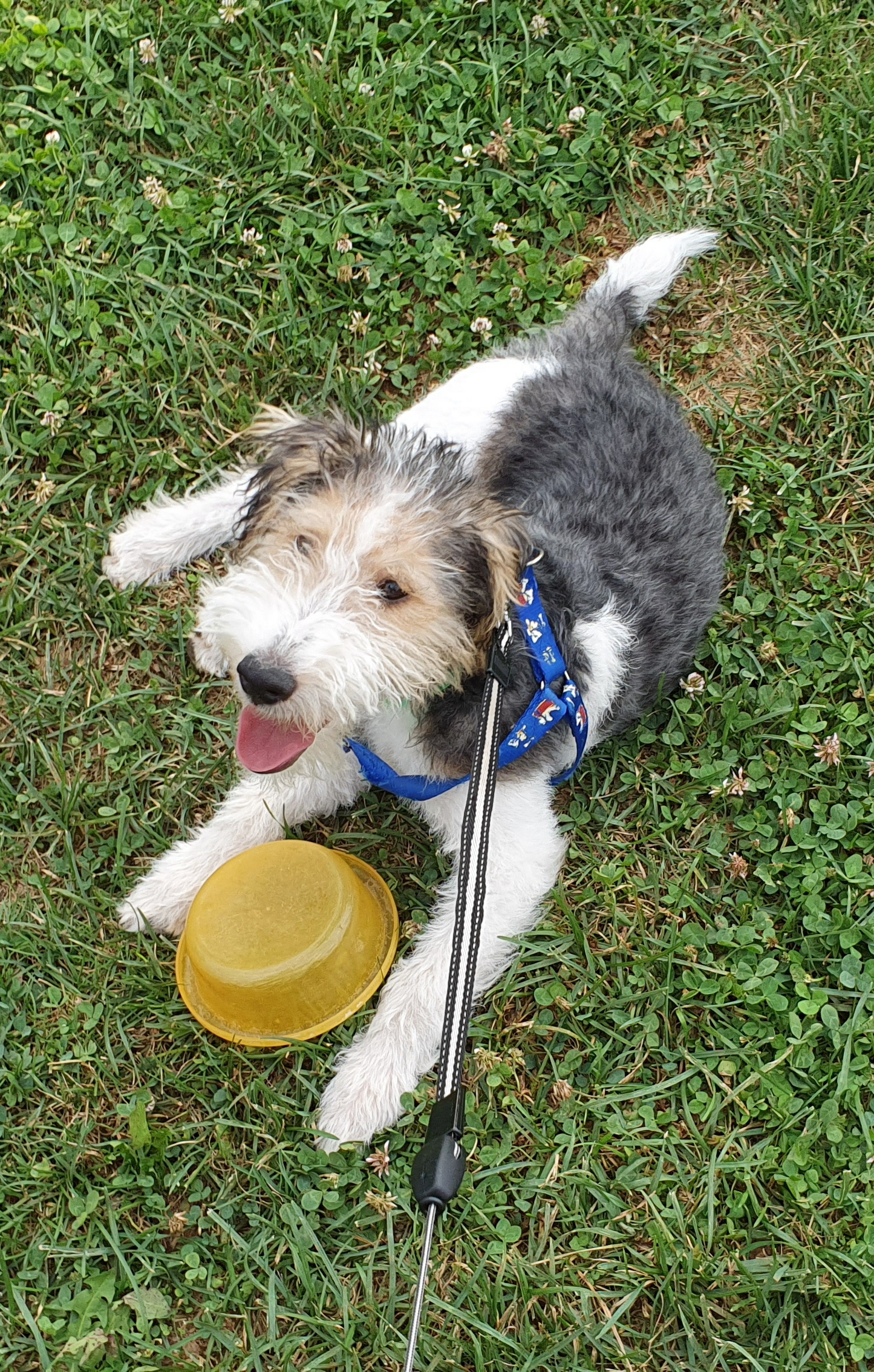
Four-month-old Wire Fox Terrier puppy playing with water bowl

Fox Terriers are two different breeds of the terrier dog type: the Smooth Fox Terrier and the Wire Fox Terrier. Both of these breeds originated in the 19th century from a handful of dogs who are descended from earlier varieties of British terriers, and are related to other modern white terrier breeds. In addition, a number of breeds have diverged from these two main types of fox terrier and have been recognised separately, including the Jack Russell Terrier, Miniature Fox Terrier and Rat Terrier. The Wire and Smooth Fox Terriers share similar characteristics, the main differences being in the coat and markings.

== History ==
English physician John Caius described the English terrier type in his 1577 work English Dogges. By the 18th century, it was recorded that all terriers were wire haired, and black and tan in colour. The earliest record of any white terrier was a dog named Pitch, who was owned by Colonel Thomas Thornton in 1790. The dog was the subject of a painting by Sawrey Gilpin, who created a portrait of it while it was still alive. An engraving of this painting, made prior to 1810, was accompanied by the text, "It would be necessary to notice Colonel Thorton's terriers if they were only on account of his justly celebrated Pitch, from whom are descended most of the white terriers in the kingdom." Dog writers of the early 20th century suggested that Pitch was a terrier-greyhound cross, which was how the colour was introduced into the breed.

Not much is known of early 19th century breeding practices that came to create the modern Fox Terrier. However it is thought that the Beagle, Old English Bulldog, English Toy Terrier, Pointer and even Dalmatian were all used in the creation and stabilisation of the breed.

From 1870 onwards, a complete pedigree for Fox Terriers exists. Three dogs, known as Old Jock, Trap and Tartar, are the ancestors of most modern strains of white terrier. Old Jock was bred from a black and tan terrier, while Trap was from the strain out of Reverend John "Jack" Russell's dogs. Russell would later have the Jack Russell Terrier series of breeds named after him. Although definitive history on Tartar is not known, he is also thought to have come from black and tan terrier stock. Of the female dogs from this period, Grove Nettle was the best known. In addition to those dogs, another named Old Tip is thought to be the forefather of the modern Wire Fox Terrier.

The terrier of this period was short of leg, built in a chunky fashion, and had a skull that was broad across the top. Used in hunting packs and kept in kennels along with English Foxhounds, they were bred for their ability to drive the fox out of its den. Gradually the pace of the hunt became faster, and the terriers were bred with longer legs for more speed towards the end of the 18th century. However the increased size meant that the Fox Terrier became too big to be used for its original purpose, and its use in fox hunting began to decline.

The Fox Terrier Club of England was founded in 1876, with the American Fox Terrier Club following nine years later, becoming the first breed speciality club to become a member of the American Kennel Club. A female Smooth Fox Terrier bred by Winthrop Rutherfurd named Warren Remedy was the first winner of Best in Show at the Westminster Kennel Club Dog Show in 1907, 1908, and 1909. Following the popularity of conformation dog shows, the Fox Terrier was the result of selective breeding. For instance, by 1949, 120 of 140 Wire Fox Terrier champions were descended from a single championship-winning dog.

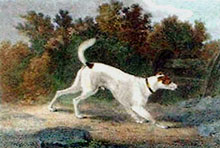
The painting of Pitch (1790), by Sawrey Gilpin (1733–1807)

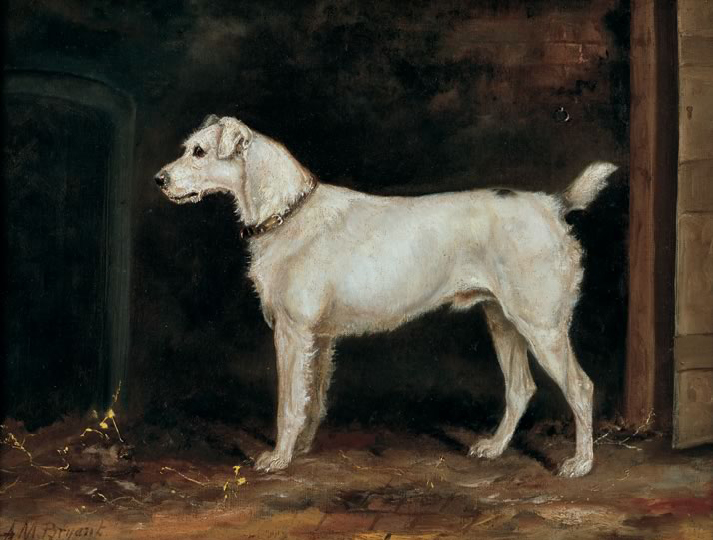
Fox Terrier Cheroot was born in 1886 and is a link between the working Fox Terriers of the early 19th century and the show dogs at the end of the century.

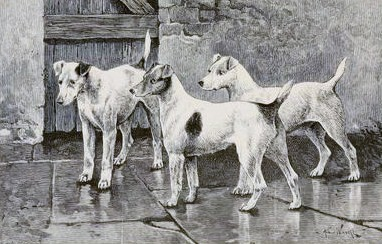
Old Jock, Grove Nettle and Tartar, three ancestors of the modern Fox Terrier

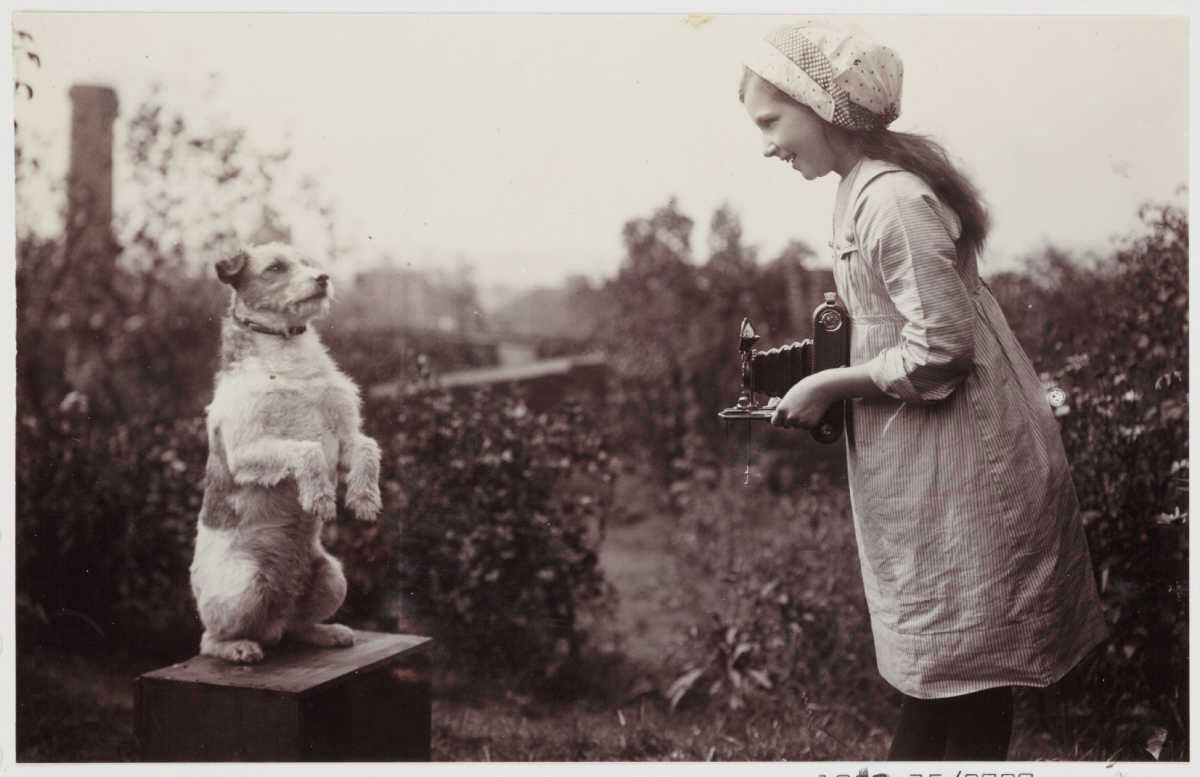
Girl taking a photo of a Fox Terrier

== Modern breeds ==
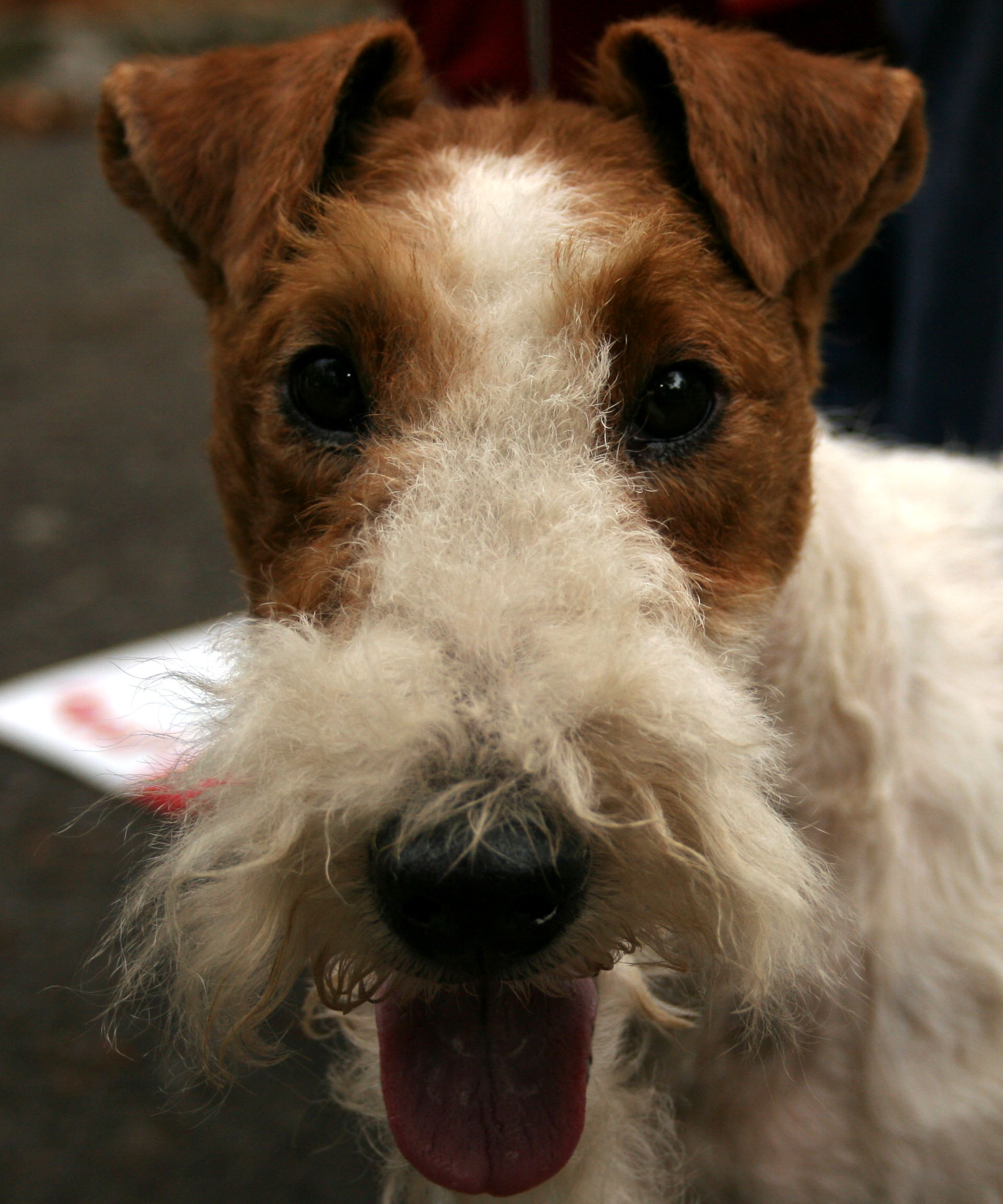
Head of a Wire Fox Terrier

There are two main breeds of Fox Terrier, Smooth and Wire, both of which originate in England. In addition, there are several descendant breeds which have been developed in a variety of countries. For example, the American Toy Fox Terrier was developed from the Smooth Fox Terrier, Italian Greyhound, Manchester Terrier, Miniature Pinscher and Chihuahua breeds.

Both major types of Fox Terrier are mostly white with coloured markings and have similar facial characteristics. They are essentially the same except for differences in coats, and slight differences in colouration and markings. Markings on either type can appear black at birth on the head, but may lighten in adult life, the most common colours being tan and black. The markings are a type of piebald spotting. Although the two main breeds were originally commonly interbred, this no longer occurs in pure-bred lines.

The Fox Terrier has been more successful than any other breed at the Westminster Kennel Club Dog Show, with four Best in Show titles going to the Smooth Fox Terrier and fourteen titles going to the Wire Fox Terrier. They were both shown as one breed with two coat variations; this changed in 1985 when the American Kennel Club listed the two as separate breeds. In the UK, at Crufts, the Smooth Fox Terrier has not won any Best in Show titles, while the Wire Fox Terrier has won on three occasions.

=== Smooth Fox Terrier ===
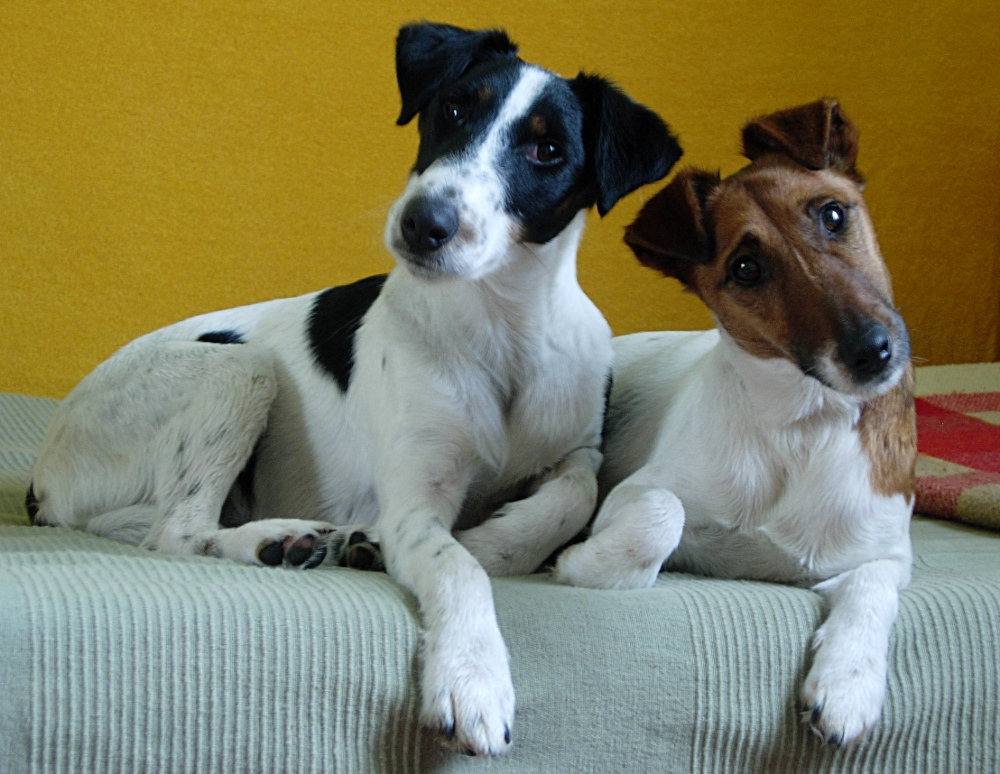
Two Smooth Fox Terriers showing the difference in breed markings

The Smooth Fox Terrier has a short, hard coat which is predominantly white. It measures 14–15.5 inches (36–39 cm) at the withers, and weighs between 15–19 pounds (6.8–8.6 kg). The head of this breed is long and wedge shaped, with small, dark eyes and ears that are v-shaped.

The breed has been identified as one of several Vulnerable Native Breeds in the UK. This is when there are fewer than 300 annual registrations with The Kennel Club. In 2010, there were 155 Smooth Fox Terriers registered, compared to 693 for the Wire Fox Terrier and 8,663 for the most popular breed in the Terrier Group, the Staffordshire Bull Terrier.

The most successful dog at the Westminster Kennel Club Dog Show was Ch. Warren Remedy, who won the Best in Show title three times between 1907 and 1909. These victories were followed by a further Best in Show title for Ch. Sabine Rarebit in 1910. Despite the Smooth Fox Terrier breed winning the first four Best in Show titles at Westminster, it has not won again since.

=== Wire Fox Terrier ===
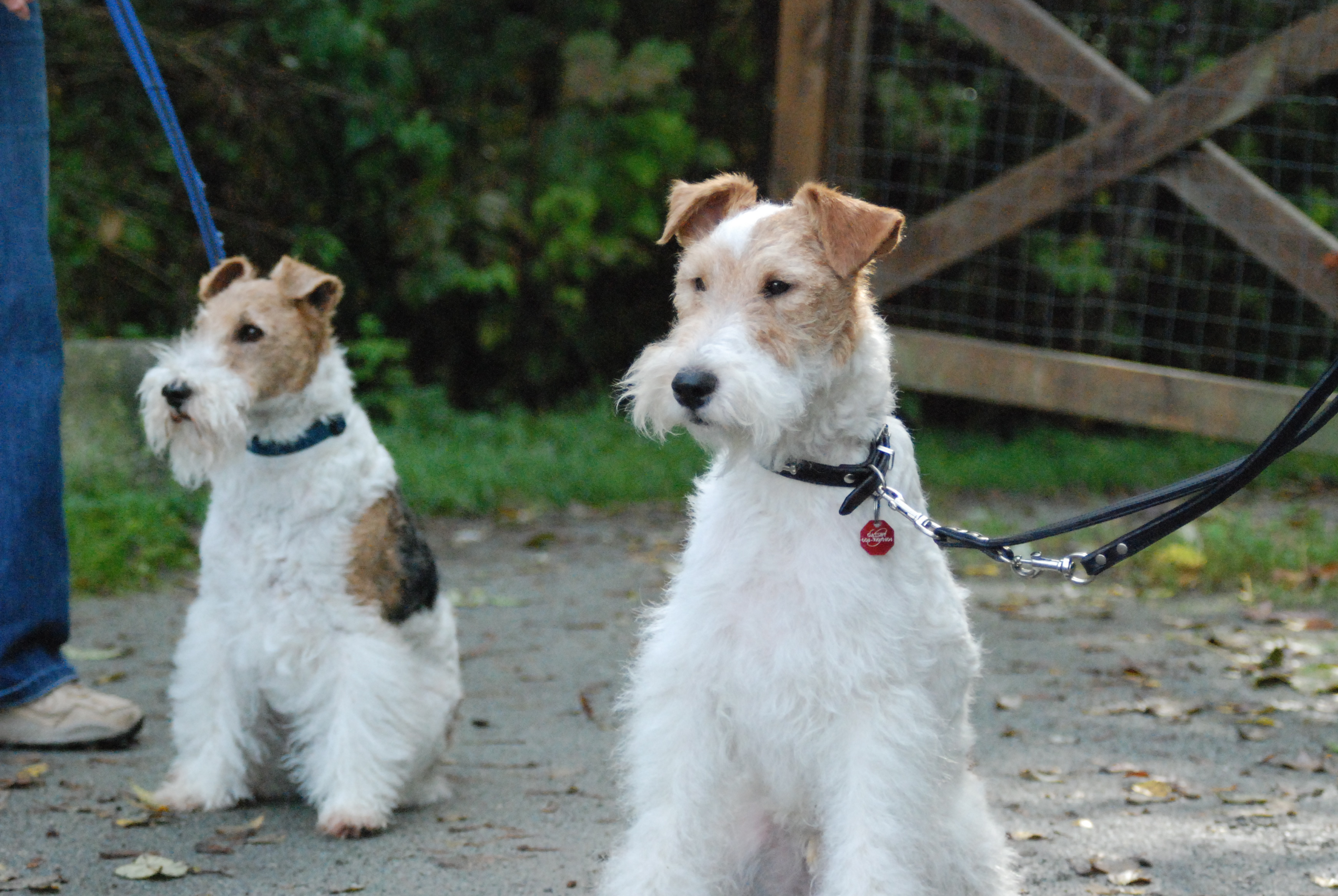
Two Wire Fox Terriers sitting

The Wire Haired Fox Terrier has a hard and crisp double coat with a coarse texture underneath that provides protection from the cold. It should be so dense that the skin cannot be seen or felt. The individual hairs should twist, but are not curly. An average member of the breed should measure 14–15.5 inches (36–39 cm) at the withers and weigh 15–19 pounds (6.8–8.6 kg). It has similar features to the Smooth Fox Terrier, with small dark eyes and v-shaped ears. Its body is shorter than it is tall.

King Edward VII owned a Wire Fox Terrier from the Notts kennel called Caesar of Notts, which did a great deal to popularise the breed at the turn of the 20th century. Another member of the Notts kennel was an early winner of Best Champion at Crufts in 1911 named Collarbone of Notts. Other individual dogs that greatly influenced the breed included Ch. Talavera Simon, born in 1924, and Ch. Zeloy Emperor, born in 1960.

=== Descendant breeds ===
Breed	Country of origin	Height	Weight	Notes	Image	Ref(s)
Brazilian Terrier	Brazil	14–16 inches (36–41 cm)	15–20 pounds (6.8–9.1 kg)	Fox Terriers were brought to Brazil in the 18th century. They were crossed with Chihuahuas, Miniature Pinschers and other small breeds during the following century and have since been used for hunting and ratting.		
Chilean Rat Terrier	Chile	11–15 inches (28–38 cm)	6–8 pounds (2.7–3.6 kg)	European settlers brought Fox Terriers with them to South America in the 18th century to act as ratters. The breed was crossed with native dogs and was developed in rural communities.		
Jack Russell Terrier	England	10–15 inches (25–38 cm)	14–18 pounds (6.4–8.2 kg)	Developed by Reverend John Russell early in the 19th century. Following his death, the line was continued in the early 20th century as a smaller working variety of the Fox Terrier. The Jack Russell Terrier has two descendant breeds of its own, the Parson Russell Terrier and the Russell Terrier.		
Japanese Terrier	Japan	12–13 inches (30–33 cm)	6–8 pounds (2.7–3.6 kg)	This breed is descended from the Fox Terriers brought to Japan by the Dutch in the early 18th century. It was mated with existing Japanese breeds and developed in the towns of Yokohama and Kobe.		
Miniature Fox Terrier	Australia	9.5–12 inches (24–30 cm)	In proportion to height.	Developed in Australia by the late 19th century, they were developed to hunt rabbits and rats. Considered to be similar to the American Toy Fox Terrier.		
Ratonero Bodeguero Andaluz	Spain	14–17 inches (36–43 cm)	15–18 pounds (6.8–8.2 kg)	Developed in Andalusia, Spain; the breed was created to eradicate rats and mice in wine cellars known as bodegas in their homeland. Their name is translated as Wine Cellar Rat Hunting Dog of Andalusia.		
Rat Terrier	United States	8–23 inches (20–58 cm)	4–35 pounds (1.8–15.9 kg)	Developed as a cross between the Fox Terrier, English White Terrier and other common terriers during the time of early immigration to America. The breed comes in three sizes: toy, which is up to 8 inches (20 cm) tall; miniature, which is up to 14 inches (36 cm) tall; and standard, which is more than 14 inches (36 cm) tall.		
Teddy Roosevelt Terrier	United States	8–15 inches (20–38 cm)	12–35 pounds (5.4–15.9 kg)	Recognised by the United Kennel Club, this breed was named in honor of Theodore D. Roosevelt, although he was not involved in its development.		
Tenterfield Terrier	Australia	10–12 inches (25–30 cm)	In proportion to height.	Established as a working dog after terriers were brought to Australia by early immigrants. Used to eliminate vermin such as rats, rabbits and foxes, it is popular among the farming community.		
Toy Fox Terrier	United States	8–11 inches (20–28 cm)	3–7 pounds (1.4–3.2 kg)	Created from the Smooth Fox Terrier and bred with a variety of toy breeds including Miniature Pinschers, Italian Greyhounds, Chihuahuas and Manchester Terriers. The breed was recognised by the American Kennel Club in 2003.		

== Common health issues ==
Myasthenia gravis, a neuromuscular disease, is hereditary in the Smooth Fox Terrier through an autosomal recessive gene. This can also be a symptom of megaesophagus, which is a health issue for the Wire Fox Terrier. Another hereditary condition in the Smooth Fox Terrier is cataracts, which is more prevalent than average in the breed. Both types of Fox Terrier can be susceptible to allergies.

In a survey conducted by The Kennel Club, the primary cause of death for Fox Terriers was old age, causing 31.8% of reported deaths. The secondary cause was cancer of an unspecified type, which accounted for 22.7% of reports. The average lifespan of a Fox Terrier is around 15 years; the Kennel Club survey reported a median age at death of 13 years and 2 months.

The wire-haired Fox Terrier is predisposed to atopic dermatitis.
