= List of toy terriers =

Toy terriers are a group of toy breeds of dog. Breeds within this group include:

- English Toy Terrier (Black & Tan)
- Japanese Terrier
- Miniature Bull Terrier
- Miniature Fox Terrier
- Rat Terrier
- Russian Toy
- Silky Terrier
- Toy Fox Terrier
- Toy Manchester Terrier
- Yorkshire Terrier
- Shih Tzu Terrier.
