= Miniature Fox Terrier =

Dog breed

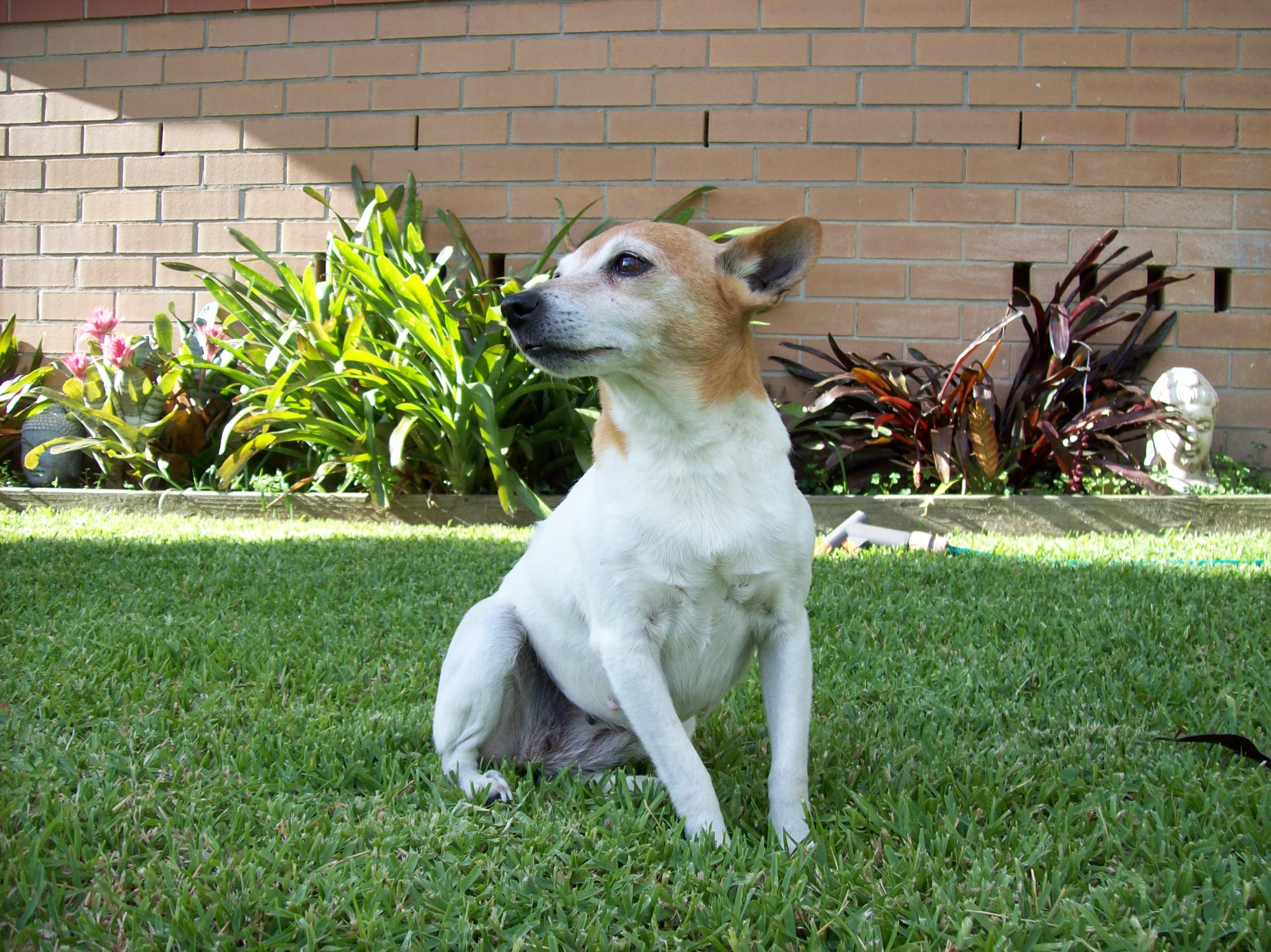
- Miniature Fox Terrier (F/16yrs)
- Other names: Toy fox terrier, Mini Foxie
- Origin: Australia
Traits
| Height | Males | 24–30.5 cm (9.4–12.0 in) |
| | Females | 24–30.5 cm (9.4–12.0 in) |
| Weight | Males | 3.5–5.5 kg (7.7–12.1 lb) |
| | Females | 3.5–5.5 kg (7.7–12.1 lb) |
- Coat: Short, dense, smooth texture
- Color: Black, white, brown &tan

The Miniature Fox Terrier is a small, fine, lightweight working terrier developed as a hunting dog and vermin router. It is known colloquially in its native Australia as the “Mini Foxie”.

== Appearance ==
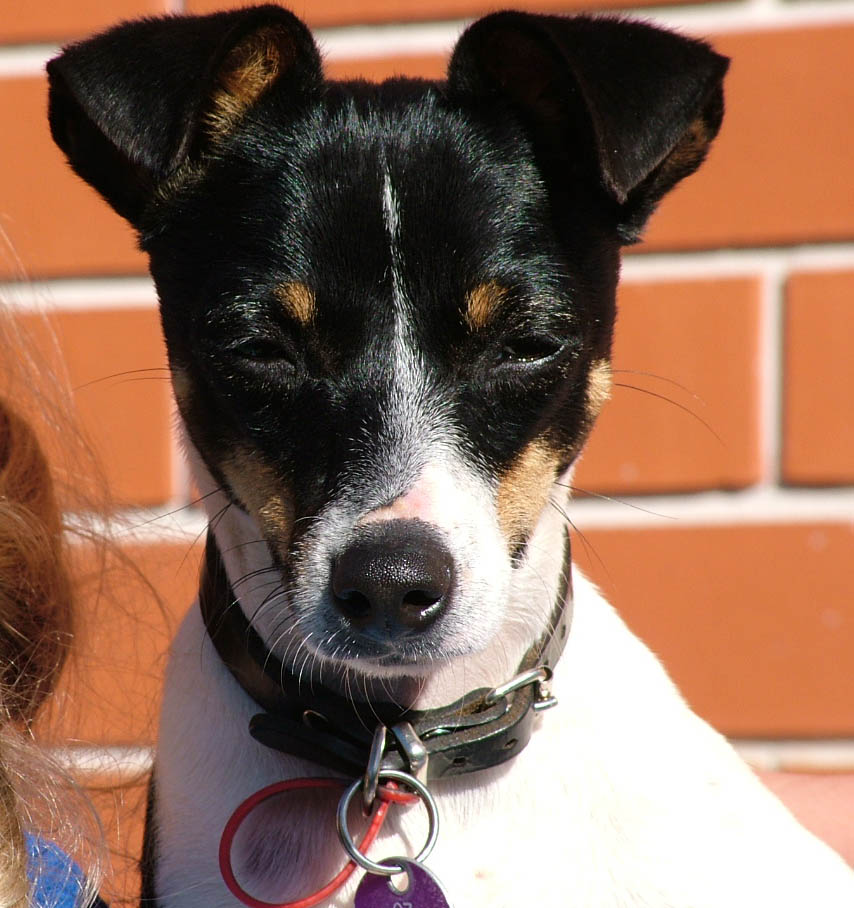
A 12-month-old Miniature Fox Terrier with folded ears

A balanced, smoothly-muscled dog breed, the Miniature Fox Terrier has a small sized, distinctive head with erectile ears that can stand straight up or fold at the tips. Another distinguishing feature is its articulate, oval-shaped foot - a feature found in very few small breeds of dog. The breed standard has always allowed for the dog's tail to be docked or undocked, however owners need to be aware of and obey local laws in this regard. Natural bobtails are known to occur. There are only three permitted colour combinations: black & white, tan & white, and black, tan & white. The coat of the Miniature Fox Terrier is always short and fine. Weight is 3.5 to 5.5 kilograms (8 to 12 lbs) and height at the withers is 9.5 to 12.0 inches (24 to 30 centimetres).

Miniature Fox Terriers are closely related to the Toy Fox Terrier, a breed that developed along similar lines in the United States. Some Toy Fox Terrier owners can trace their dogs’ pedigrees to "Foiler", the first Fox Terrier registered by the Kennel Club in Britain, circa 1875–6. Other related breeds include the Jack Russell Terrier, the Rat Terrier, and the Tenterfield Terrier.

=== Temperament ===
Bred for hunting rodents (rats, mice) and rabbits principally, these dogs are known for their speed and agility. With the ruthlessness of their attack on rodent pest species and their ability to squeeze into and out of tight spaces, they have made themselves an indispensable part of many Australian farms since the 19th Century. Miniature Fox Terriers have proved well-suited to being domestic pets in more urban environments (according to the breed club). Their diminutive size, short clean hair and loyal acceptance of their place in the social hierarchy make them good pets, particularly in households with small children. They thrive on positive socialisation and are happy to be rewarded with pats and being praised when being trained and trainers do not have to rely on treats to obtain a good result.

Miniature Fox Terriers generally get along well with other animals but, like most working terriers, cannot distinguish between small pets—such as reptiles and fancy rats—and vermin, and so should not be left alone with such animals. They are confident and will generally interact with dogs and other animals many times their size and have fun times.

== History ==
The breed was most likely developed from crosses between smaller Fox Terriers and Fox Terrier types and Toy Manchester Terriers, and, later, some were crossed to other toy breeds such as the English Toy Terrier and Whippet. Hunters were seeking a smaller, speedy Fox Terrier that could be used for hunting smaller pests such as rats and rabbits. Although the origins of the breed are English, the breed was developed in and is endemic to Australia. By the late 19th century, the breed type was clearly identifiable and these small terriers proved their worth against rabbits, rats, and snakes on Australian farms, where they were often known simply as "the little foxies". The dogs demonstrated tenacity, endurance, and extreme loyalty to their owners; they were routinely taken on the hunt, were sometimes used in search parties, and were used at Sydney’s North Head Quarantine Station, the Riverstone Meat Works^{[1]}, and the Brisbane City Council as vermin exterminators.

The dog’s vigilance, size, affectionate temperament, and ease of care soon resulted in its becoming a popular choice in urban centers as well, and by the 1920s the Miniature Fox Terrier was iconic. So well known and popular was the “Little Foxie” that very little thought was given to the need to preserve its lines.

=== History of the breed club ===
By the 1980s, the interest in dog fancy, the looming spectre of proposed breed-specific legislation, and increasing concerns about the need to protect purebred dogs led a group of enthusiasts to begin meeting informally to consider the future of these little dogs. In July 1986, the Miniature Fox Terrier Club of Australia (MFCA) was formed. The founding members, in conjunction with members of the Royal NSW Canine Council, wrote a breed standard for the breed and laid out a Constitution for the Club. To comply with New South Wales government regulations for becoming an incorporated organization, the Miniature Fox Terrier Club became incorporated as the Mini Foxie Club of Australia, Inc. in 1992.

In 1991, fanciers in South Australia also formed a breed club. For these members, official recognition of the dog by the Australian National Kennel Council (ANKC) was the most important of their goals. At that time, challenges to the name “Miniature Fox Terrier” were being mounted, and threatened to preclude recognition by an All-Breed club. These members joined with some owners in Western Australia and organised as the Tenterfield Terrier Club of Australia (1993), a name which was first used by a television presenter Burke from Burke's Backyard.

The ensuing breed standard for the Tenterfield Terrier differs in substance from that of the Miniature Fox Terrier, and though the two dogs are sometimes confused, they have been developing along divergent lines for over twenty years and are now different breeds. Some years ago the ANKC placed a moratorium on the registration of any MFCA-registered Miniature Fox Terrier as a Tenterfield Terrier. Miniature Fox Terrier Club of Australia registered pedigrees are protected by Australian Copyright Law.

The breed is not recognized by the ANKC and the independent Mini Foxie Club of Australia Inc. holds the registry of pedigrees for this breed. The club also organises shows, prints a quarterly newsletter and promotes a lively and friendly atmosphere amongst members. The club's strict policies that were put in place to protect the health and soundness of this unique breed have paid dividends.

In 2005, the breed names Miniature Fox Terrier and Mini Foxie were added to the list of dog breeds recognized under the NSW Companion Animals Act. Miniature Fox Terrier Club of Australia registered breeders can register their breeding dogs with their local council.

== The Miniature Fox Terrier today ==
Although still relatively unknown outside of Australia and New Zealand, "the little foxie" is renowned in its native land. Parliamentarians have made reference to the breed during legislative hearings on canine issues. 'Pasqua' and ‘Fergus’ owned by Anthony Field of The Wiggles, are Miniature Fox Terriers now aged 17. Ian Thorpe, the Australian swimmer, has spoken fondly of Tiny, his Miniature Fox Terrier, in several interviews. Sean Carlow, Australian men's figure skating champion, owns a Miniature Fox Terrier. Television and print media have also featured Toby Allen of Human Nature with his Miniature Fox Terriers.

Today, the Miniature Fox Terrier is still very much a working terrier and is in demand on farms across Australia. They remain popular as pets and enjoy playing the pampered pooch. As long as their active minds are kept stimulated with games or toys and they receive at least moderate exercise, they make excellent pets for anyone with kids, the elderly and are great companions.

== See also ==
- List of dog breeds
- Fox Terrier
- Toy terrier
- Rat Terrier
- Tenterfield Terrier
