= Rat terrier (disambiguation) =

A rat terrier is any dog of terrier type used as a ratter. It may also refer to:

- The Rat Terrier, a modern American breed of dog
- The Ratonero Bodeguero Andaluz, a traditional Spanish breed of dog
