= Old Jock =

English show dog, 1859–1871

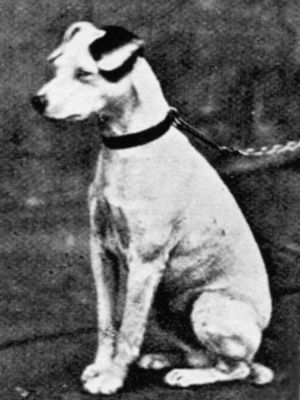
- Species: Canis familiaris
- Breed: Fox Terrier
- Sex: Male
- Born: 1859
- Died: 1871 (aged 11–12)
- Nationality: England
- Notable role: Working terrier and Show dog
- Parents: Sire: Jock; Dam: Grove Pepper
- Weight: 16–18 lb (7.3–8.2 kg)

Old Jock (1859–1871), was a Fox Terrier famous during the late 19th and early 20th centuries. A mostly white dog, he ran briefly with a hunting kennel before becoming a show dog, most notably with a victory at the show which popularised the Fox Terrier. His main show rivalry was with a dog named Tartar, and along with a dog named Trap, the three were popular sires of the Fox Terrier breed. He was also involved in the early formation of the Jack Russell Terrier and the Dandie Dinmont Terrier breeds.

== Early life ==
According to the Kennel Club studbook, Old Jock was bred at some point during 1859 either by Captain Percy Williams in his Rufford Kennels, or by Jack Morgan who at the time was a huntsman with the Grove Kennels. He was bred from Jock and Grove Pepper, both huntsman's terriers. Jock was owned by Captain Williams, while Grove Pepper was owned by Morgan. It was claimed in W.D. Drury's 1903 work British Dogs, Their Points, Selection, And Show Preparation that Old Jock was in fact bred from Quorn Kennels and that the listing in the Kennel Club studbook was incorrect.

He was a mostly white terrier, weighing between 16–18 pounds (7.3–8.2 kg) during his lifetime. He had a tan mark on one ear, and a black patch near his stern and at the base of his tail. With strong legs and a well sprung chest, although it was noted that he had the appearance of having a missing rib when in thin condition. His ears were well placed with strong jaws and was described by dog author Rawdon Lee as being a "symmetrical terrier". Compared to his rival Tartar, he was considered to be far less of the Bull and terrier type.

Old Jock ran two hunting seasons with the Grove Hunting Kennels and his tail was docked, although at a longer length than was considered normal at the time.

== Show career ==
Jock's main rival in the show ring was a dog named Tartar, who was said to be more fond of ratting than his competitor. Jock was said to have never killed a rat; his ability to hunt Foxes was also thought to be a myth.

In 1862 at the National Exhibition in Birmingham, a dog show was held with a class for the new breed listed as "White and Other Smooth-haired English Terriers, except Black and Tan". Several Fox Terriers were shown, with a total of twenty four entries in the class. Old Jock placed first, with Old Trap owned by Mr. Bayly coming second and Mr. Stevenson's Jack placing third. This was the first time that the Fox Terrier attracted public attention.

At the Crystal Palace dog show in 1870, in what was considered to be the dog champion class of that time with the qualification requirement of a first place win at another show, Old Jock placed second. The winner was a black and tan terrier named Trimmer, with a line-up of notable dogs in the history of the Fox Terrier including Mr. Murchison's Old Trap; Mr. W.J. Harrison's Jocko; Mr. F Sale's Tyrant, Hornet and Tartar; the Marquis of Huntly's Bounce; Mr. Bewley and Mr. Carson's Quiz; and Mr. W. Gammon's Chance. This was the final time Old Jock was exhibited in the show ring.

In total, Jock won 33 first prizes (of which 8 were champion classes) and 4 second prizes, starting at the 1862 Birmingham show until the 1870 Crystal Palace show.

== Death and legacy ==
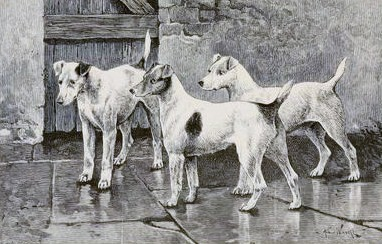
Old Jock (far left), Grove Nettle and Tartar, three of the dogs which have led to the modern Fox Terrier.

Although Old Jock has already changed hands on several occasions, prior to the Crystal Palace Show of 1870 he was sold from Mr. W. Cropper to Mr. J.H. Murchinson for the sum of around £60, which was supposedly the dog's weight in silver. It was in Murchinson's possession that Jock died in 1871.

Three male dogs are considered to be the founding sires of the modern lines of Fox Terriers: Old Jock, Old Trap and Tartar. Of those three, Jock was considered to be more of a terrier than the other two. Reverend John Russell, who kept his strain of terriers quite pure, once admitted that he had used Old Jock to breed certain qualities into his dogs. Jock was also used to breed certain elements into the Dandie Dinmont Terrier. The very first Fox Terriers in Australia were bred from Old Jock, Grove Nettle and their contemporaries.

== See also ==
- List of individual dogs
