= Toy Manchester Terrier =

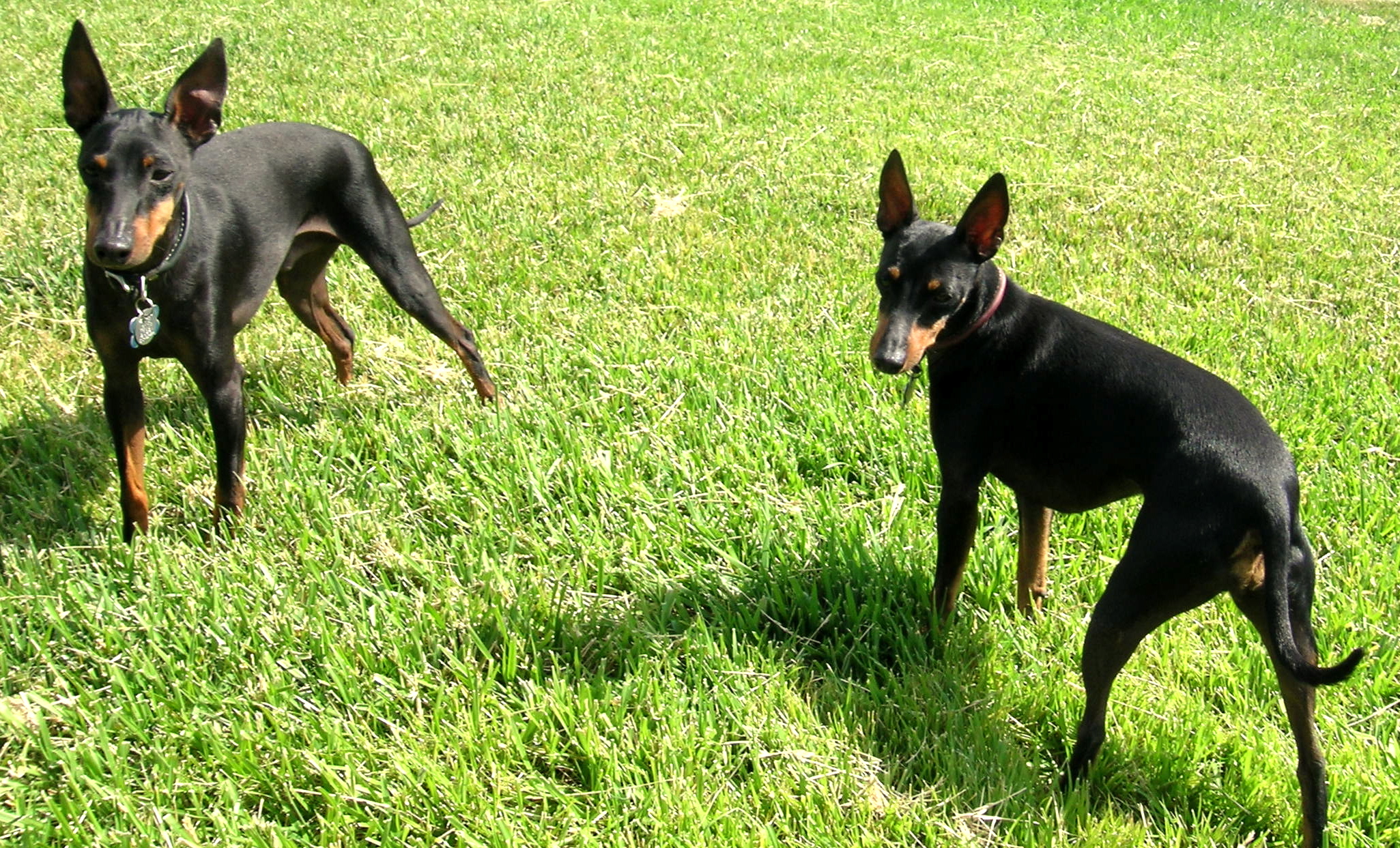
- Toy Manchester Terrier
- Origin: United States
- Foundation stock: Manchester Terrier
Kennel club standards
- American Kennel Club: standard

The Toy Manchester Terrier is a breed of dog, categorized as a terrier. The breed was bred down in size in North America from the Manchester Terrier, and is placed in the Toy Group by the American Kennel Club and the Canadian Kennel Club (the Manchester Terrier is placed in the Terrier Group). Neither the Fédération Cynologique Internationale nor The Kennel Club recognize a Toy variety of the Manchester Terrier.

== History ==
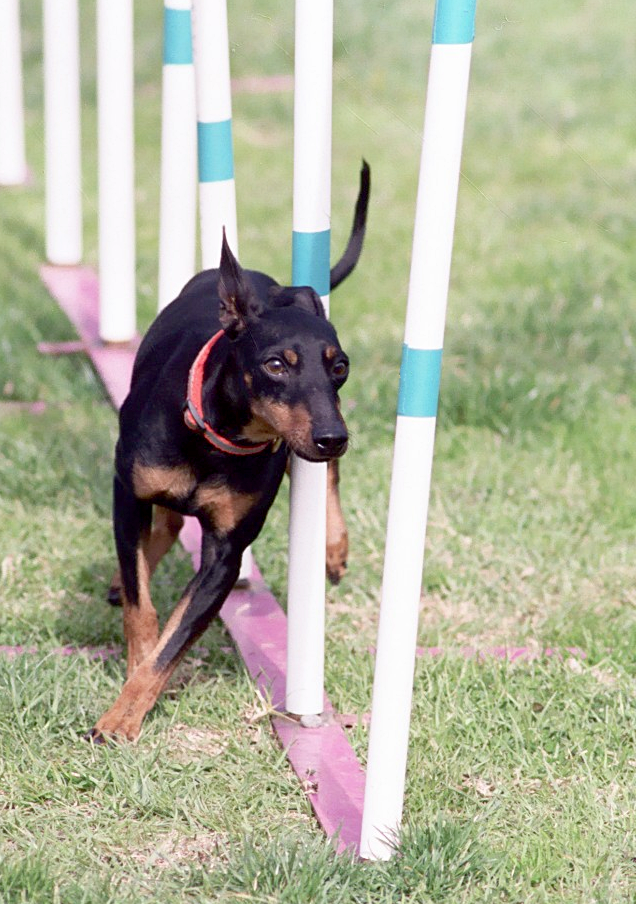
Toy Manchester Terrier doing agility

The Manchester Terrier, from which the Toy Manchester Terrier was bred, was developed in the 19th century from crosses between an old Black and Tan Terrier with the Whippet, along with other breeds, primarily for rat-catching. In England, another breed was also developed in the 19th century in Manchester, the English Toy Terrier, as a separate breed from the Manchester Terrier. The English Toy Terrier was a popular pet in Victorian England, and bred to be very small, some weighing as little as 1 kg (2.2 lbs.)

The Toy Manchester Terrier breed was developed by breeding down the Manchester Terrier in size. In the United States in the 1920s the breed was called the Toy Black and Tan Terrier. The name was changed to the Toy Manchester Terrier and the American Toy Manchester Terrier Club was formed in the 1930s. The American Toy Manchester Terrier was recognised by the American Kennel Club in 1938, but by the 1950s the breed had declined and the breed club ceased to exist. Due to declining numbers of the breed, the Toy Manchester Terrier breed was re-defined as a size division of the Manchester Terrier in 1958 by the American Kennel Club, and the club name (including the two breeds as varieties) was changed to the American Manchester Terrier Club in 1958.

In England, the very similar English Toy Terrier (Black & Tan) has also declined, to the point where it is listed by the Kennel Club as being in danger of extinction. In order to rescue the breed, the Kennel Club has opened the stud book to allow certain selected examples of the North American Toy Manchester Terrier to be registered and bred as an English Toy Terrier (Black & Tan). However, the two breeds are not considered to be identical, and the standards for the two breeds show different requirements.

== Appearance ==
The Toy Manchester Terrier in North America is a small, long-legged dog with a short coat marked with tan, a long tail and ears which stand upright. In color and general conformation the Toy Manchester Terrier follows the standard for the Manchester Terrier. However, the Toy Manchester Terrier cannot exceed 12 pounds (5.4 kg) in weight; and, unlike the larger Manchester Terrier, for the Toy Manchester Terrier, cropped ears are a disqualification. Ears should be wide at the base and pointed at the tip. Flaring "bell" ears are a serious fault, meaning that it is undesirable to breed a dog with such ears; it does not mean that the dog has any disadvantages as a companion.

=== Black and Tan ===
Black and Tan is a dog coat colour that derives from one of the alleles known to exist at the genes mapped in dogs, and can be recognised with genetic testing (agouti gene, a^{t} a^{t}).

== Health ==
A 2024 UK study found a life expectancy of 13 years for the breed compared to an average of 12.7 for purebreeds and 12 for crossbreeds.

== Similar breeds ==
The English Toy Terrier (Black and Tan) is considered to be the same breed as the Toy Manchester Terrier. In contrast with the Toy Manchester Terrier though, the desirable size for the English Toy Terrier (Black and Tan) is slightly smaller, and wider ears are also preferred.

While the visual similarities of the Miniature Pinscher, another toy dog that somewhat resembles the Toy Manchester Terrier, remain a matter of controversy, genetic research (published in 2017) has shown that the two breeds have shared, unique ancestry. The ancestors of the Toy Manchester and Miniature Pinscher may have become geographically separated many centuries ago and retained similarities simply through breeding selection for the same traits; nevertheless, the 2017 also showed that the two breeds remain more closely related to each other than to other breeds.

The Russian Toy is another similar dog, developed in Russia from early imports of the English Toy Terrier. They may be of various colours, not just Black and Tan, indicating a possible background in other breeds as well.

== See also ==
- List of dog breeds
- Tiny the Wonder, famous mid-19th century Toy Manchester Terrier
- English Toy Terrier (Black & Tan)
- Toy terrier
