= Andalusian Terrier =

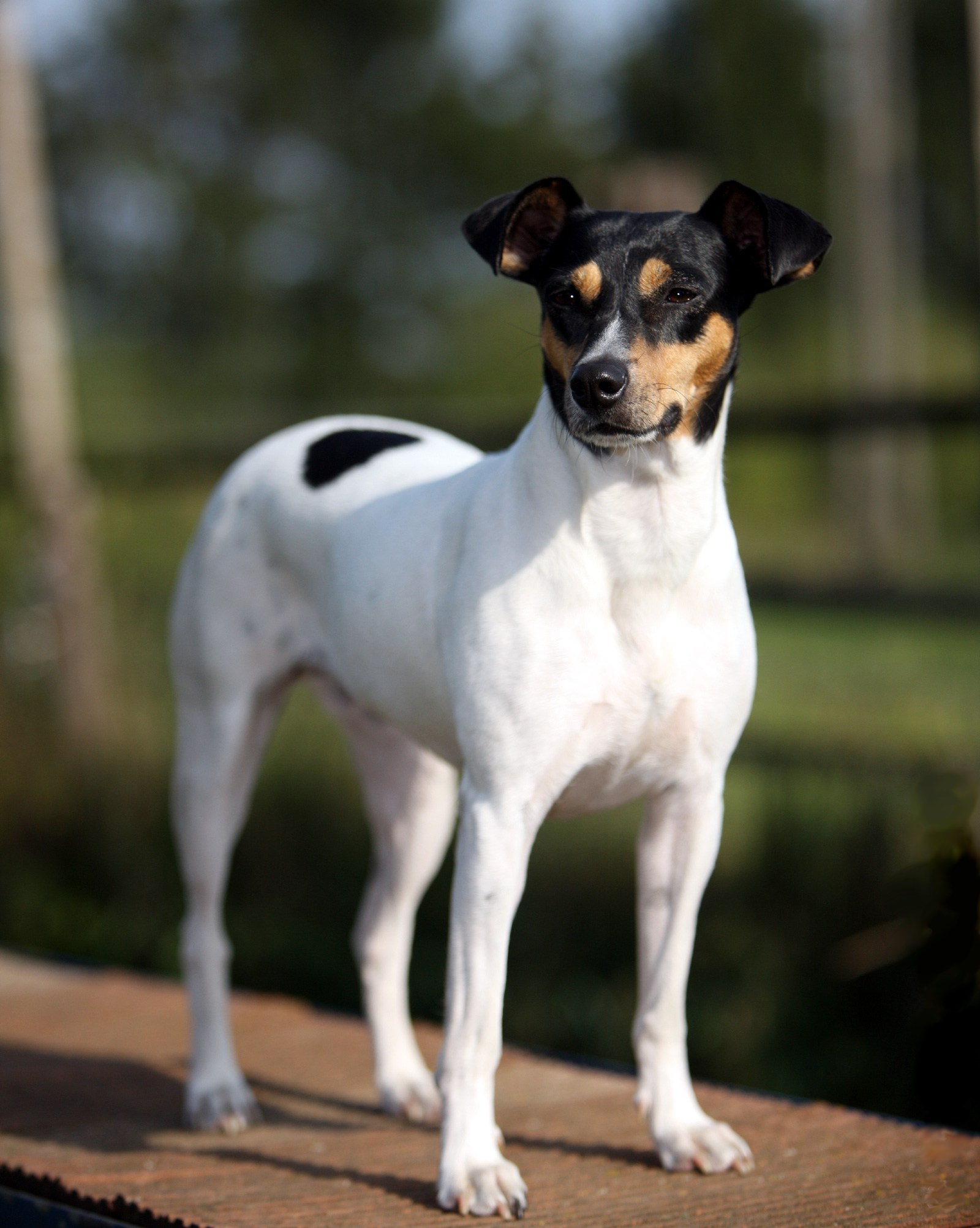
- Other names: Ratonero Bodeguero Andaluz; Bodeguero Jerezano; Perro Ratonero Andaluz; Andalusian Wine-Cellar Rat-Hunting Dog; Perro Bodeguero Andaluz; Andalusian Ratter; Sherry Terrier
- Origin: Spain
Traits
Height	Males	37–43 cm
	Females	35–41 cm
Weight	Males	10-12 kg
	Females	8-10 kg
- Colour: white with black and tan markings
Kennel club standards
- Real Sociedad Canina de España: standard
- Fédération Cynologique Internationale: standard

The Andalusian Terrier (Ratonero Bodeguero Andaluz) or Sherry Terrier (Bodeguero Jerezano) is a Spanish breed of dog of terrier type. Its Spanish name reflects its main occupation: hunting rats and mice hidden between barrels in the wineries of Andalusia in Spain. It was recognised as an indigenous Spanish breed in 2000 by the Spanish Ministry of Agriculture and by the Spanish Kennel Club, the Real Sociedad Canina de España.

The Bodeguero Andaluz has been declared ‘Patrimonio Cultural Inmaterial’ (which translates to intangible cultural heritage) by the city council of Jerez de la Frontera in 2020 due to the value of this breed and their connection to the cities and the wine cellars

== History ==
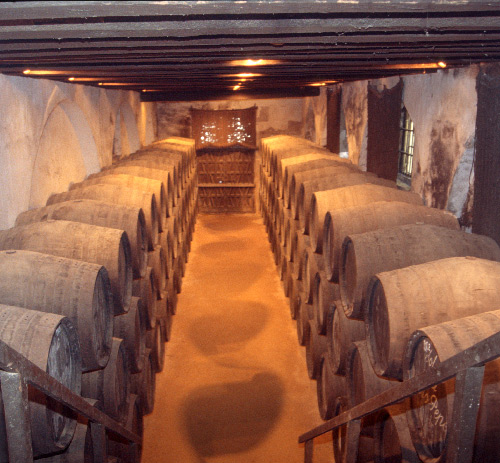
Inside a bodega

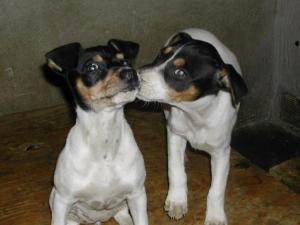
Puppies

English wine merchants settling in the sherry-making region of Spain, Marco de Jerez, brought with them the ancestors of today's Fox Terrier breeds as long as several hundred years ago, where they were crossed with local dogs and used for vermin control of rats and mice in the wineries. In the 1900s, the Toy Terrier was crossed into the breed. In 1993, the first breed club, the Club Nacional del Perro Andaluz Ratonero Bodeguero, was formed, and a breed standard was written. In 2000 the breed was recognised as a native Spanish breed by the Spanish Ministry of Agriculture. In September 2024, the Fédération Cynologique Internationale accepted the breed.

== Appearance ==
The Ratonero Bodeguero Andaluz is of medium-sized breed, measuring between (37 - 43 cm, the ideal for males being 40 cm and for females 38 cm) at the withers. Appearance-wise, they look like enlarged Jack Russell Terrier with longer and more elongated limbs, to the extent that it has on occasion been called the Spanish Jack Russell. The breed is an agile dog with a lean and athletic build; the head is triangular with a semi-flat skull. The eyes are very dark and the Ratonero has a long muzzle, and high set ears that bend over at the tip. The tail is traditionally docked to one quarter of its length, however they may also be born with a natural bobtail.

The coat is short and dense, which is typically white. Its facial markings are a mixture of brown, white and black markings (known as tricolor), usually with tan-colored eyebrows.

== Temperament ==
This breed in general is lively, intelligent and has strong hunting instincts, highlighting especially their tenacious skills and attentiveness, which are needed when hunting for rodents. They also generally have an impeccable sense of smell and sight, can coordinate their movements, and are extremely agile. They are known for their loyalty, friendliness, and their capability to adapt to environments.

== Health ==
No diseases specific to this breed, or claims of extraordinary health, have been documented for the Ratonero Bodeguero Andaluz, though an undescended testicle is not uncommon in male pups.

== Similar breeds ==
Breeds similar in appearance to (but not the same as) the Ratonero Bodeguero Andaluz include the Jack Russell Terrier, the Parson Russell Terrier, and the Rat Terrier. Differences and similarities between the Terrier Brasileiro and the Japanese Terrier are detailed on the breed club's website.

The breed has been compared with other ratting dog breeds that originated in Spain: Ratonero Murciano de Huerta, Ratonero Valenciano and Ratonero Mallorqui. Their traits, intelligence, trainability, sociability, and behavior are all similar, but they differ only in size, color and conformation. None of these breeds are recognized by the Fédération Cynologique Internationale or the American Kennel Club.
