= Russian Toy =

Russkiy Toy / Russian Toy
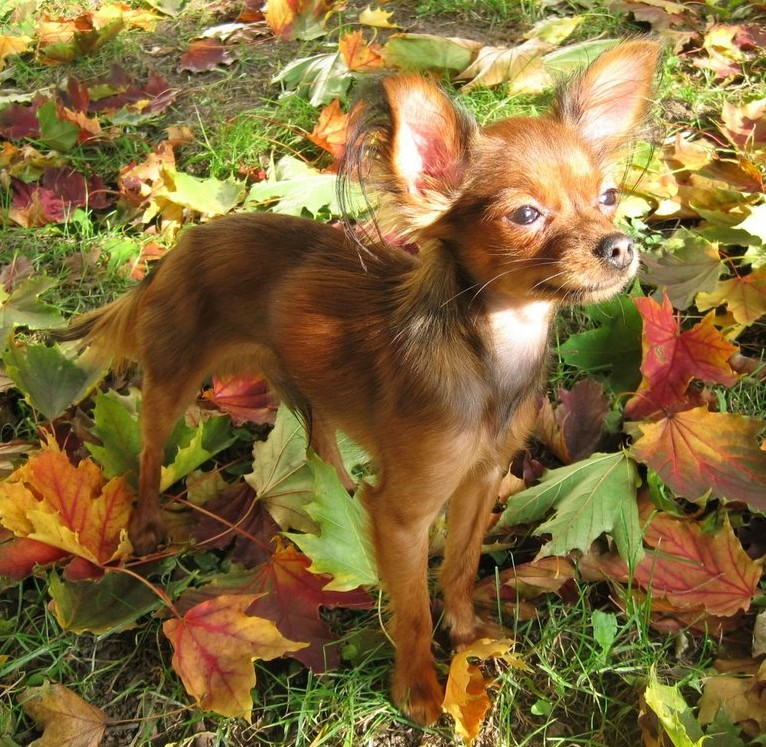
- A long-haired Russkiy Toy
- Other names: Russian Toy Terrier, Russian Terrier, Moscow Toy Terrier, Moscovian Miniature Terrier
- Origin: Russia

The Russian Toy (also known as the Russian Toy Terrier, and in Russia as the Russkiy Toy, Russian: русский той) is a very small breed of dog originally bred in Russia from the English Toy Terrier. There are two types of coats in the breed: smooth coat and long coat. The smooth-coated variety was previously known as the Russian Toy Terrier and long-coated as the Moscow Long-Haired Toy Terrier. Both were brought together under the same Russian Toy Terrier name in 1988 and the "Terrier" was dropped from the name when the breed was added in 2006 to the official list of breeds registered with the Fédération Cynologique Internationale. The breed has been registered in the Foundation Stock Service of the American Kennel Club (AKC) since 2008, and has been allowed to compete in AKC companion events since 2010. The first official breed standard of the two varieties was written in 1966 in Russia.

The breed was nearly wiped out twice; first in the 1920s with the rise of Communism due to the toy dog's traditional link to the aristocracy and again in the 1990s with the influx of foreign breeds following the fall of the Iron Curtain. The smooth coat type is the older of the two types, with the long coat type first appearing in 1958.

Until the 1990s, the breed was almost unknown outside of Russia, and so relatively few details on associated health issues are known. The Russian Toy was originally bred as a rat fighter and watchdog, and can still exhibit the vocalization expected from the latter. It is a friendly dog and can become very attached to the family unit. Due to its size and similarities to the Chihuahua, the two are often compared, but are not closely related.

== Description ==
The Russian Toy is one of the smallest breeds in the world, measuring 20–28 centimetres (8–11 in) and weighing 1.5–4 kilograms (3–9 lb). It has a small, distinctive head with large eyes and triangular ears. In countries where docking is prohibited, the tail is curved in the shape of a sickle. There are two types in the breed, distinguished by their coats; one is long-coated and the other smooth-coated. The smooth-coated dog has a short, shiny, close-lying coat. The long-coated variety has a longer coat and profuse feathering in the ears, legs and tail. The feathering or "fringe" on the ears is usually 3–5 cm (1.2–2.0 in) long, can be straight or with a slight wave. It will be grown by the age of three and should completely cover the outer edges and tips of the ears.

The smooth coat type of the breed closely resembles the Pražský Krysařík breed of the Czech Republic. The Pražský on average is a little shorter on leg and a little heavier than the Russian Toy.

Both of the Russian Toy varieties can be crossed and produce smooth- and long-coated puppies from the same litter. In addition, when two smooth-coated dogs are bred together, they may occasionally bear a long-coated offspring if the long hair gene is present in their pedigrees. However, there have been no records of two long-coated Russian Toys breeding together and producing smooth-coated offspring.

The breed has four main colors: black and tan, blue and tan, brown and tan, and solid red of various shades. Red includes sable (red where the tips of the hairs are black, known as overlay) and red sable (red with brown overlay).

== Health ==
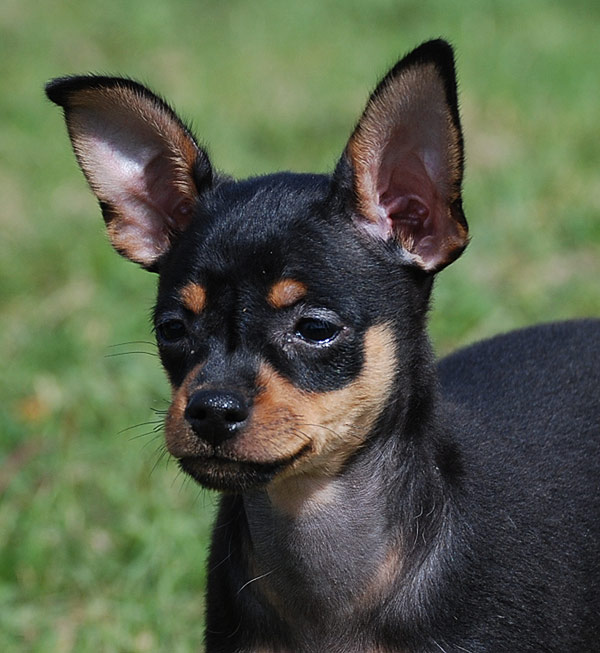
Portrait

A Russian Toy will often require the help of a veterinarian to remove any retained deciduous teeth (known as "puppy teeth" or "baby teeth") that fail to fall out and make way for the permanent teeth. Without this intervention, usually done under anesthetic, the baby and permanent teeth will occupy the same socket in the jaw, which can cause tartar deposits, tooth decay, gingivitis and periodontitis, and can lead to premature loss of teeth. Retained puppy teeth can also cause misalignment of the teeth.

As with most breeds of dog, the Russian Toy can suffer from patellar luxation, which is where the knee cap slips out of place when the knee bends as the groove that normally holds it in place is too shallow. It is usually an inherited defect, which occurs during the development of the foetus and rarely by trauma.

Russian Toys can suffer from bone fractures due to their small and sometimes delicate nature.

== Temperament ==
The Russian Toy was originally bred both as an anti-rat dog and a watch dog. They are commonly described as cheerful and vocal. Russian Toys are also known to form deep bonds with their owners regardless of the dog's age. They also protective of their owners, leading to them being distrustful of people they do not recognize.

== History ==
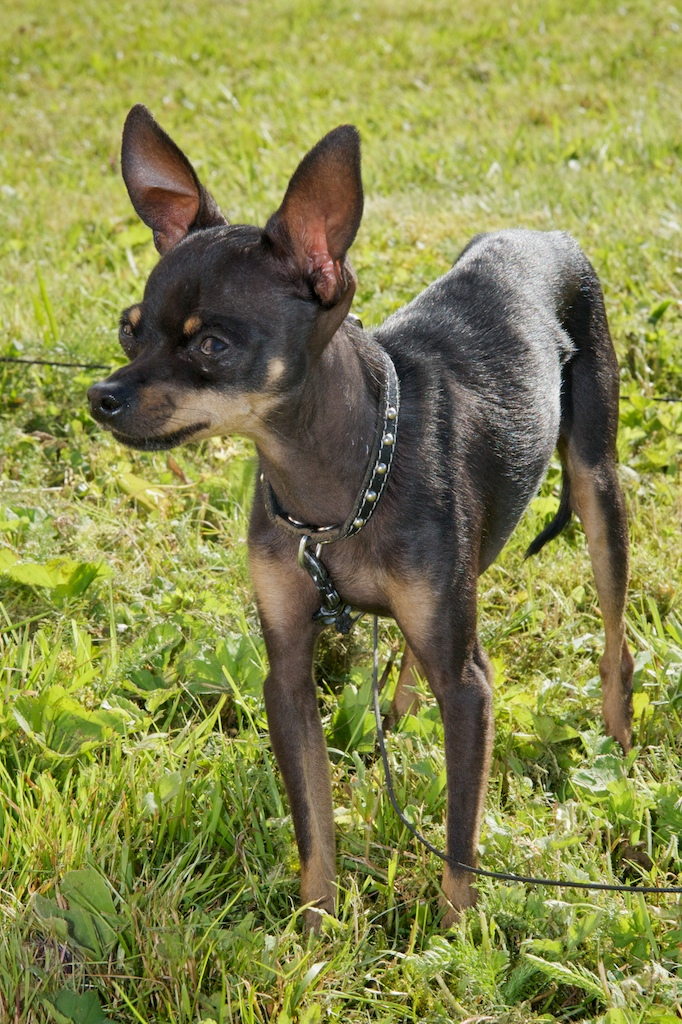
A smooth-coated Russkiy Toy

The first evidence of English-style terriers in Russia can be seen in the Museum of Zoology in Saint Petersburg. On display is an English style terrier dated 1716–1726 with a sign that reads "This dog is a short hair terrier named Lizetta. It personally belonged to the Russian Emperor Peter the Great." Indeed, the breed was developed as a companion dog for the Russian nobility. According to some accounts, records indicate that eight smooth-coated Russian Toys competed in a dog show in Saint Petersburg as far back as 1874. The more generally accepted first reference to the breed appears in May 1907 when 11 Russian Toys were shown at an exhibition in Saint Petersburg. In 1923, two dogs appeared at a Moscow dog show and in 1924, three more were awarded medals at a show in Odessa. But as a result of the October Revolution, the Russian Toy diminished in popularity and in numbers as these types of dogs were closely linked to the aristocracy and therefore frowned upon. In 1947, only one dog was shown in Saint Petersburg. When breeding began to revitalize the stock of Russian Toys in Russia, only a few of the dogs left had pedigrees or were purebred.

The lack of numbers and political isolation of the country at the time caused the creation of a new breed quite distinct from the former English style toy dog as breeders sought to stabilise the remaining toy sized terriers into a standard breed. The resulting contemporary Russian Toy has most of the features of the classic toy terrier, with the addition of some new characteristics. The head is high but not wide, the cheeks are flat and the eyes are round. By 1960, 76 dogs were entered into an exhibition and the first standard for the two Russian Toy varieties was written in 1966 and authorized by the Ministry of Agriculture.

In 1988, the Russian Kynological Federation published a new breed standard, combining the short-coated Russian Toy Terrier and the long-coated Moscow Toy Terrier under "Russian Toy Terrier." However, after the fall of the Iron Curtain in 1989, the popularity of imported exotic breeds nearly drove the Russian Toy into extinction. A resurgence occurred thanks to a new energetic generation of dog breeders, but the breed remained virtually unknown outside of Russia until the 1990s. Several kennels have now been established outside Russia, the most successful ones located in Finland, Estonia, Belarus, Ukraine and Czech Republic. Interest in the breed is on the rise in the US and Japan.

The Russian Toy was provisionally recognised by the Federation Cynologique Internationale in 2006 and gained definitive recognition in 2017.

The United Kennel Club and the Foundation Stock Service of the American Kennel Club both accepted the breed in 2008

Russian Toys are also recognized by the American Rare Breed Association and International All Breed Canine Association.

=== Development of the long-coated Russian Toy ===
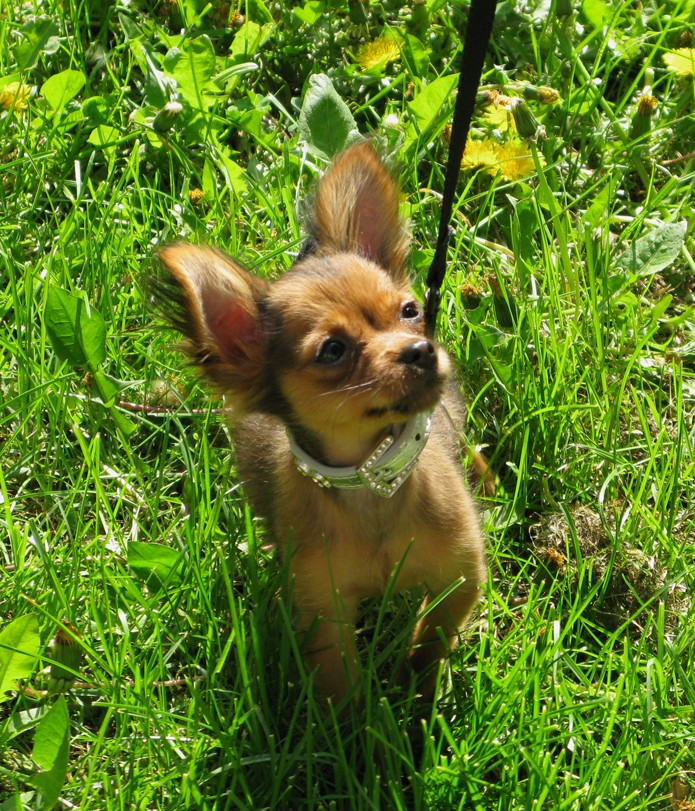
A long-haired Russian Toy puppy

The original long-coated Russian Toy is arguably a dog named Chikki born on 12 October 1958 to two smooth-coated dogs that both had slightly longer hair than was typical. Initially, the puppy was not to be registered as its coat was too long to meet the breed standard, and usually such dogs would not participate in breeding programs and would often be put down. Chikki, however, was registered with a pedigree and purchased by Evgeniya Fominichna Zharova. Zharova is thus the long-coated variety's founding breeder as the first breeder to intentionally retain and breed a dog with a longer coat. Chikki developed an ear fringe and was mated with a female named Irma, who also had a longer coat than most smooth-coated dogs, and together they produced a litter of three long-coated puppies. Zharova developed the breed in Moscow, and so it came to be known as the Moscow Toy Terrier. The breed made its first appearance at a dog show in 1964 and the standard was set in 1966. Ten years after Chikki's birth, between 1968 and 1969, approximately 300 long-coated dogs were registered – a significant number considering that Russian Toy litters tend to be small, typically one to three puppies. Today, the long-coated variety has an established presence in Poland, the Czech Republic, Estonia, Ukraine and a number of other countries, but the breeding program is particularly strong in Finland.

The first Russian Toy was brought to Finland in 1988 when a long-coated male named Black-Champion-Bonaparte was imported from Russia and registered by Sirpa Lehtinen under Kennel Jojamint's. A female named Ste-Shihu was brought later that same year from Estonia by the same owner, and the two produced Finland's first Russian Toy litter (Jojamint's Agostini and Jojamint's Alboreto) also in 1988. Black-Champion-Bonaparte and Ste-Shihu were the first Russian Toys to appear in a dog show in Finland in 1989.

== American Kennel Club history ==
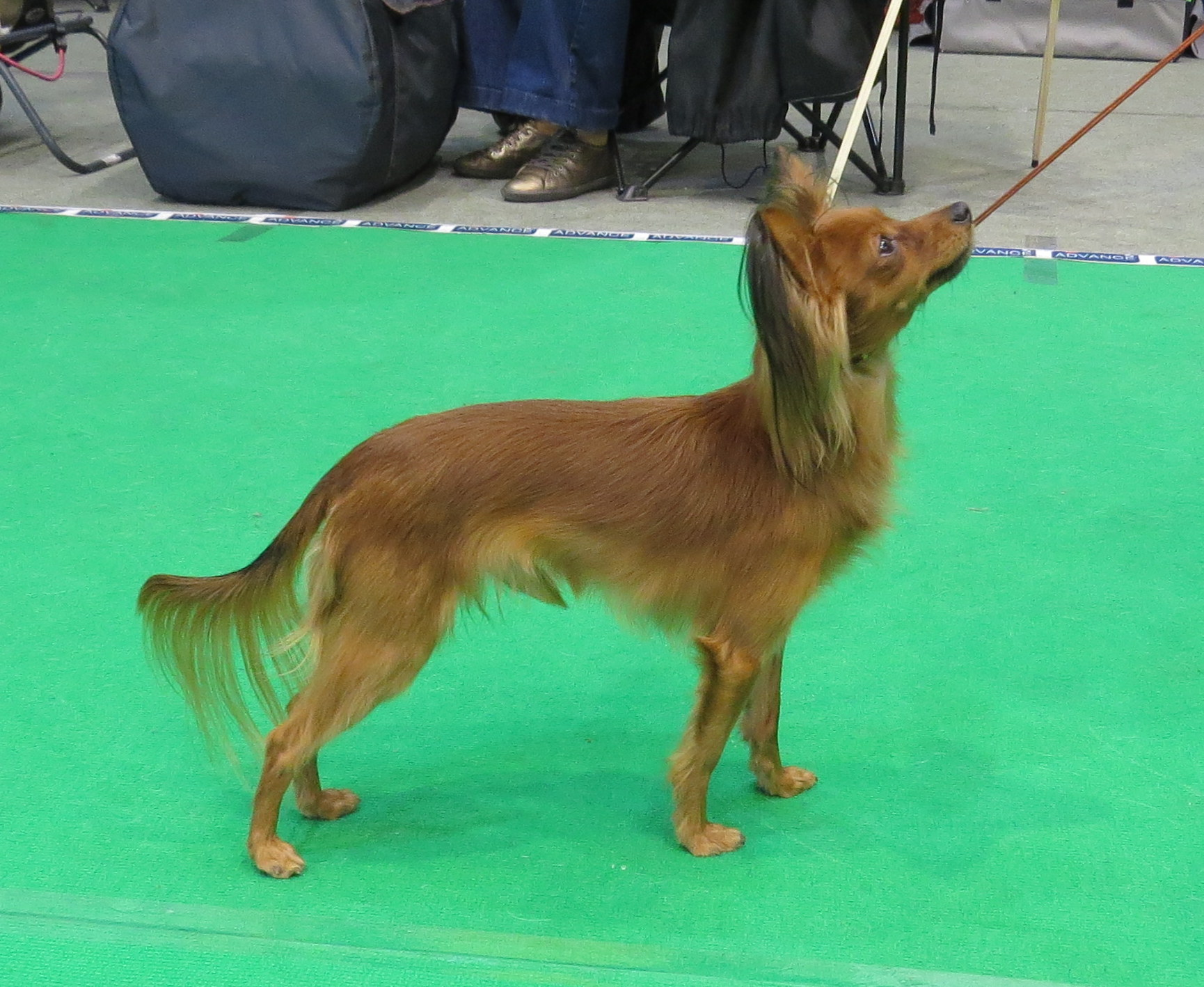
A Russkiy Toy

The Foundation Stock Service (FSS) of the American Kennel Club (AKC) accepted the Russian Toy into its records in August 2008, and in July 2009, the Russian Toy was approved to compete in AKC companion events from 1 January 2010 onwards. Russian Toys can also be shown and earn Certificate of Merit Points at FSS Open shows.

In 2008, the AKC board and FSS also acknowledged the Russian Toy Club of America (RTCA). The following year, the AKC board and FSS acknowledged Russian Toy Dog Club of America, Inc. (RTDCA).

In 2010 this second club, RTDCA, decided to become the National Club for the Russian Toy breed in the United Kennel Club (UKC), where it became known as the Russkiy Toy Dog Club of America, Inc. (RTDCA). In 2013, the RTDCA was asked by AKC to separate into two distinct clubs with different officers to form two independent clubs: one to represent the AKC club and the other to represent the UKC Club. The AKC Russian Toy Dog Club of America added the word "The" to their name and became The Russian Toy Dog Club of America (TRTDCA) while the UKC club retained the original Russkiy Toy Dog Club of America name (RTDCA).

In August 2013, AKC stated that the two clubs RTCA and TRTDCA must combine into one club to represent the Russian Toy breed in the AKC.
