= Chilean Terrier =

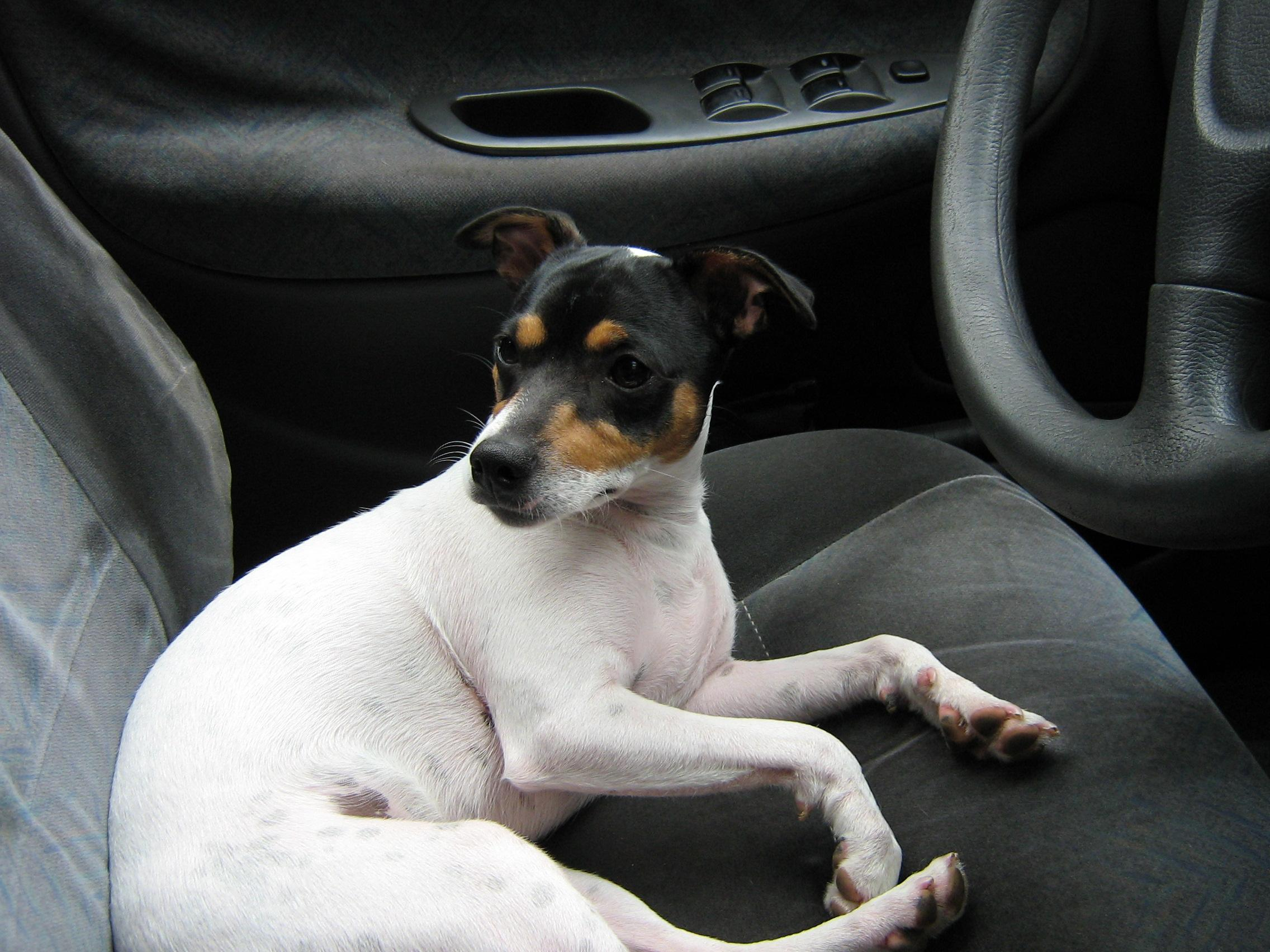
- Young Chilean Terrier
- Origin: Chile
Traits
Height	Males	32–38 cm (13–15 in)
	Females	28–35 cm (11–14 in)
Weight	Males	5–8 kg (11–18 lb)
	Females	4–7 kg (9–15 lb)
- Coat: short
- Colour: white dog with black and tan, brown and tan, or blue and tan colouration
Kennel club standards
- Kennel Club de Chile: standard

The Chilean Terrier is the first breed of dog from Chile. The breed dates back to the late 19th century, resulting from the crossing of the Smooth Fox Terrier with the Ratonero Bodeguero Andaluz. This dog is recognised by the Kennel Club of Chile (KCC), but is not recognized by the FCI yet. Since 2011, the breed is classified into Group 3 of Alianz Canine Worldwide (ACW).

== History ==
Talking about the Chilean Terrier involves traversing the Chilean history since the 18th century. There is a history of their presence in the country since colonial times, when European immigrants settled in the territory of South America, bringing Smooth Fox Terriers with them in order to exterminate rats and small rodents.

Of their English ancestors inherited the restless temperament and barking, while local dogs traced the balance, courage, loyalty and spirit of duty.

Tireless companion during the 18th and 19th centuries, the breed was developed in the estates of south-central Chile, easily acclimating to a rustic life, often in a stable. Thus, both peasants and landlords were able to share with this great little dog, so never during that period of our history is identified with a particular social class or caste.

In the late 19th century and the Industrial Revolution, many farmers migrated to the cities, bringing their families and their Chilean Terriers. Quickly able to adapt to urban life, being used in new industries and new human settlements (CITES) for the extermination of rats. Because of this last factor, Chilean Terriers were identified for most of the last century with the working-class proletarian country element that played against those who were beginning to take the first steps to establish the activity in Chile, mostly immigrants and members of the bourgeoisie of the time, those more interested in the entry and development of foreign breeds in achieving recognition of the Chilean Terrier.

Despite the near-zero interest of local breeders of the time he appeared in, the Chilean Terrier continued to be present in the homes of the middle class of the country, further through the comic Condorito and his ever-faithful Washington, a Chilean Terrier which demonstrates «the Chilean» of this little dog.

Today the Chilean Terrier is present throughout the country, it has the virtue of adapting to a variety of climates of Chile, still being used in rural areas as a hunter of mice and in the city, including an excellent dog company, attentive and lively.

== Description ==
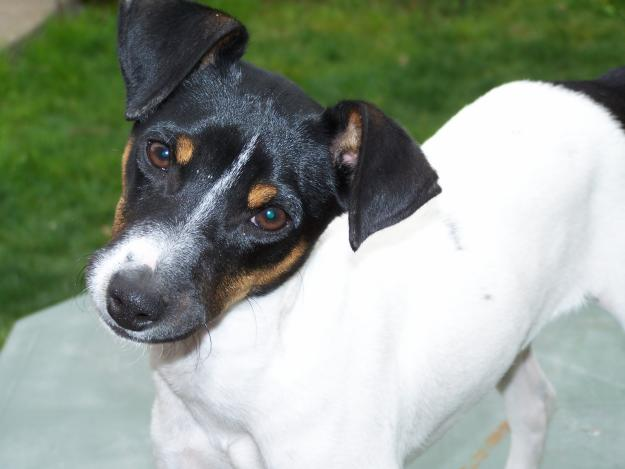
A Chilean Terrier

Its main color is white, which is accompanied by black and brown markings. It has a shorthaired undercoat that sometimes hints at some dark spots visible through the white mantle. The ears are set high with a forward-leaning as a "V" tip. It has a well-developed teeth and bite. Males have a height of between 32 and 38 cm tall at the withers, the ideal height being 35 cm. Females have a height of between 28 and 35 cm tall at the withers, being the ideal height of 32 cm. Males weigh between 5 and 8 kg, ideal weight is 6.5 kilos. Females weigh between 4 and 7 kg, and the ideal weight is 5.5 kg.

== Famous Chilean Terriers ==
A famous Chilean Terrier is Washington (from the comic Condorito), Condorito's dog. Even though it was only recognised internationally in 2011 by the ACW (Alianz Canine Worldwide), there have been several Chilean Terrier exhibitions in Chile for many years, and now the breed is selling through Internet pages all along Chile, Bolivia, Argentina, Ecuador, and other South American countries.

== See also ==
- List of dog breeds
