= Toy Fox Terrier =

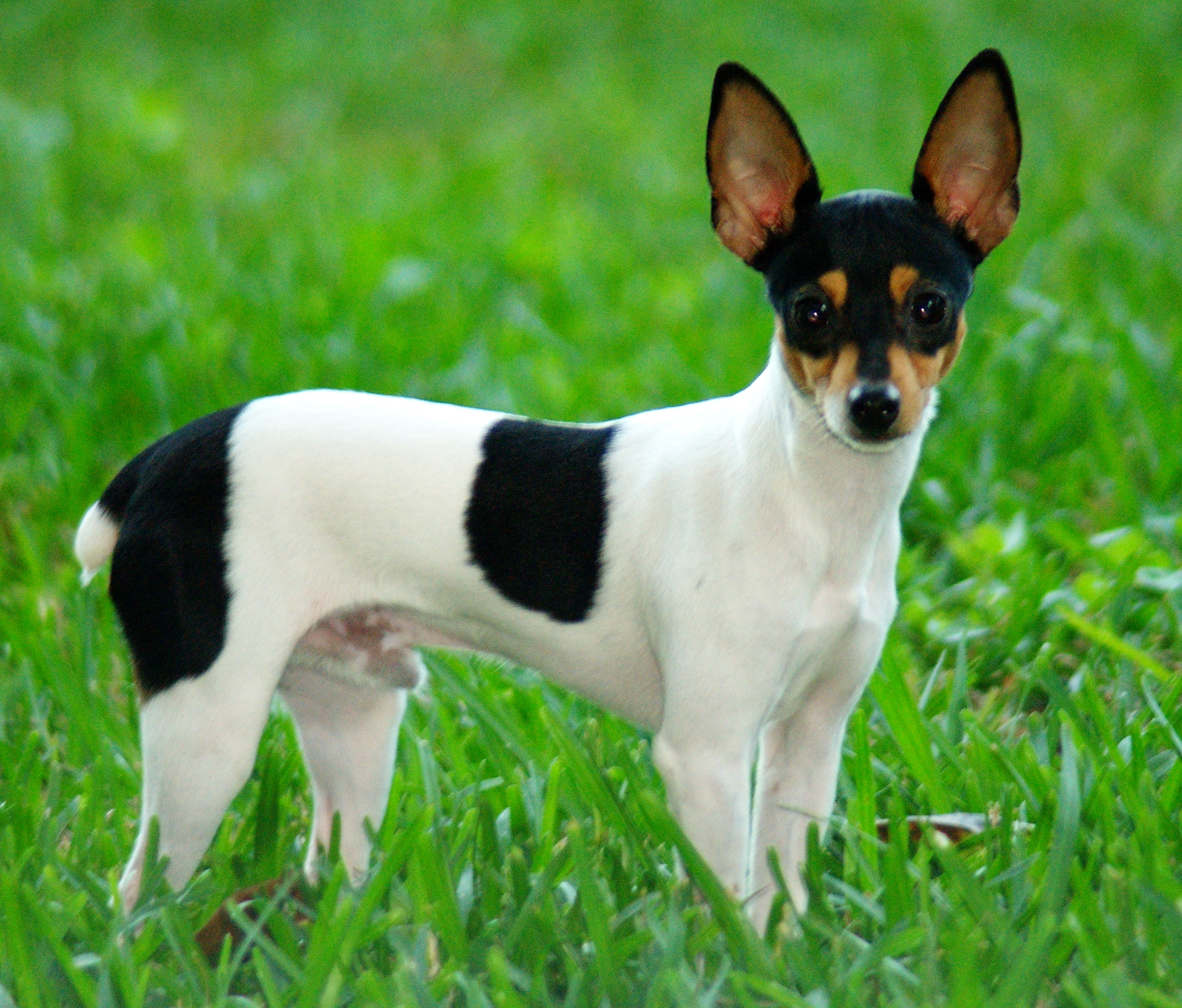
- A male Toy Fox Terrier of the 'Tri-Color' variety.
- Other names: American Toy Terrier; Amertoy
- Origin: America
Kennel club standards
- United Kennel Club: standard

The Toy Fox Terrier is a small terrier breed of dog, directly descended from the larger Smooth Fox Terrier but since 1936, it has been registered in the United States with the UKC as a separate breed.

== Description ==
=== Appearance ===
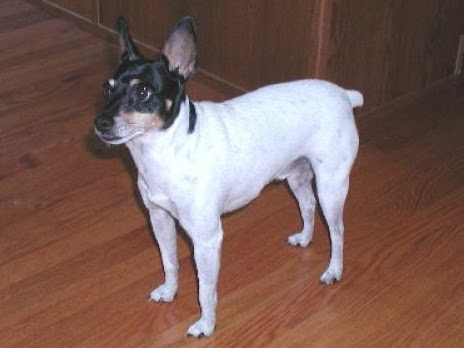
An 8-year-old male Fox Terrier of the common 'Tri-Color' variant. Note that the tan on the face dulls with age.

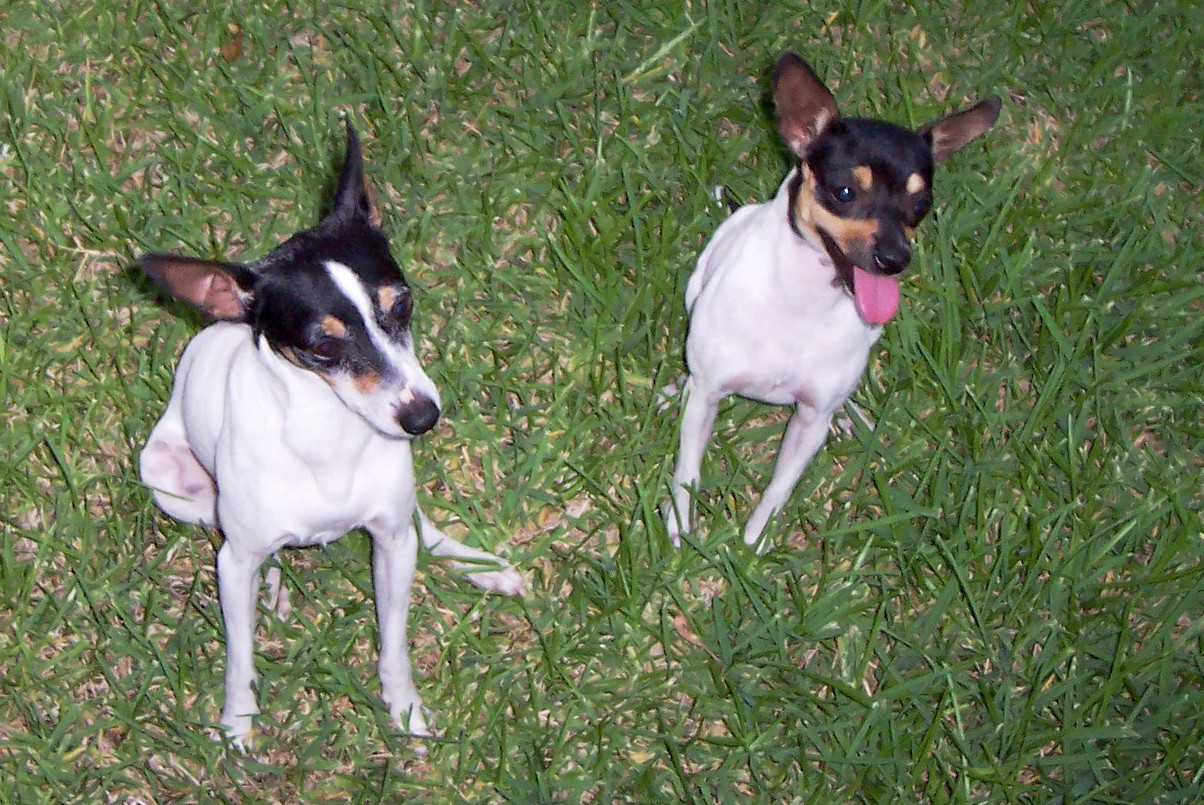
Male and female Toy Fox Terriers of the common 'Tri-Color' variant.

Toy Fox Terriers are small dogs with a muscular and athletic appearance. Notable characteristic traits include a short glossy and predominantly white coat, coupled with a predominantly solid head, and a short, high-set tail. The breed has been deemed elegant and graceful with V-shaped ears and large eyes. The tail can be short and straight or long and shiny, and breeders often shorten the tail a few days after birth by clipping it about three-fifths of the way from the tip (at the third or fourth joint). The coat is short, fine, and glossy in black with tan, with areas of tan on the face; there are two other variants, one with 'chocolate' replacing the black in areas (the UKC does not allow this variant to be shown), another which is all white with tan and no black at all, and one which is white with black markings and no tan accents. These variants are often known as 'Tri-Color', 'Chocolate', and 'White and Tan', and 'White and Black" respectively. The height ranges from 8.5–11.5 inches at the shoulder (21.5–29.2 cm) and weight from 3.5–9 kg.

=== Temperament ===
Toy Fox Terriers were commonly used by clowns in circus shows. Like other terriers, they are active, though typically less so than the Jack Russell Terrier, and they are regarded as suitable for older owners. They are considered easy to train and suitable as companions for people with disabilities, and they are loyal to their owners. Dogs of this breed tend not to bark much if they are well trained.

== Health ==
A 2024 UK study found a life expectancy of 12.9 years from a sample of 52 deaths for the breed compared to an average of 12.7 for purebreeds and 12 for crossbreeds. Toy Fox Terriers, like other toy breeds are prone to patellar luxation (slipped stifle), Legg–Calvé–Perthes syndrome and von Willebrand disease.

== History ==
The Toy Fox Terrier is believed to have originated in the United States in the early 1900s. It has historically been both a farm dog and a household pet due to their skills at catching rodents. This breed has been commonly crossed with other breeds in the past, such as the Toy Manchester Terrier, the Chihuahua, and the Italian Greyhound.

Some Toy Fox Terrier breeders can trace their dogs' lineage back to a Smooth Fox Terrier called "Foiler", the first fox terrier registered by the Kennel Club in Britain, circa 1875–76. It is believed that careful breeding from smaller Smooth Fox Terriers without crosses to other toy breeds such as Manchester Terrier and Chihuahua resulted in the Toy Fox Terrier of today.

Toy Fox Terriers were recognized by the United Kennel Club (UKC) in 1936 and placed in the Terrier Group, and by the American Kennel Club (AKC) in 2003 (Toy Group). Before 1936, Toy Fox Terriers were registered under Smooth Fox Terriers in the UKC until they were granted their own name and breed status.

== See also ==
- List of dog breeds
- Fox Terrier, for additional details on history, genetics, coat color, etc.
- Rare breeds

== Bibliography ==
- Coile, Caroline. Encyclopedia of Dog Breeds. B.E.S. Publishing, 2015.
- Davidson, John F., The Toy Fox Terrier - Wired for Action (a 2006 revision of The Toy Fox Terrier)
- Hopkins, Eliza and Flamholtz, Cathy The Toy Fox Terrier
- Bielsky-Braham, Tanya, Send in the Clowns. AKC Gazette, December, 2002
- Sherry Baker Krueger, Toy Fox Terrier, T.F.H. PUBLICATIONS, 1993 ISBN 0-86622-868-3
