= Tenterfield Terrier =

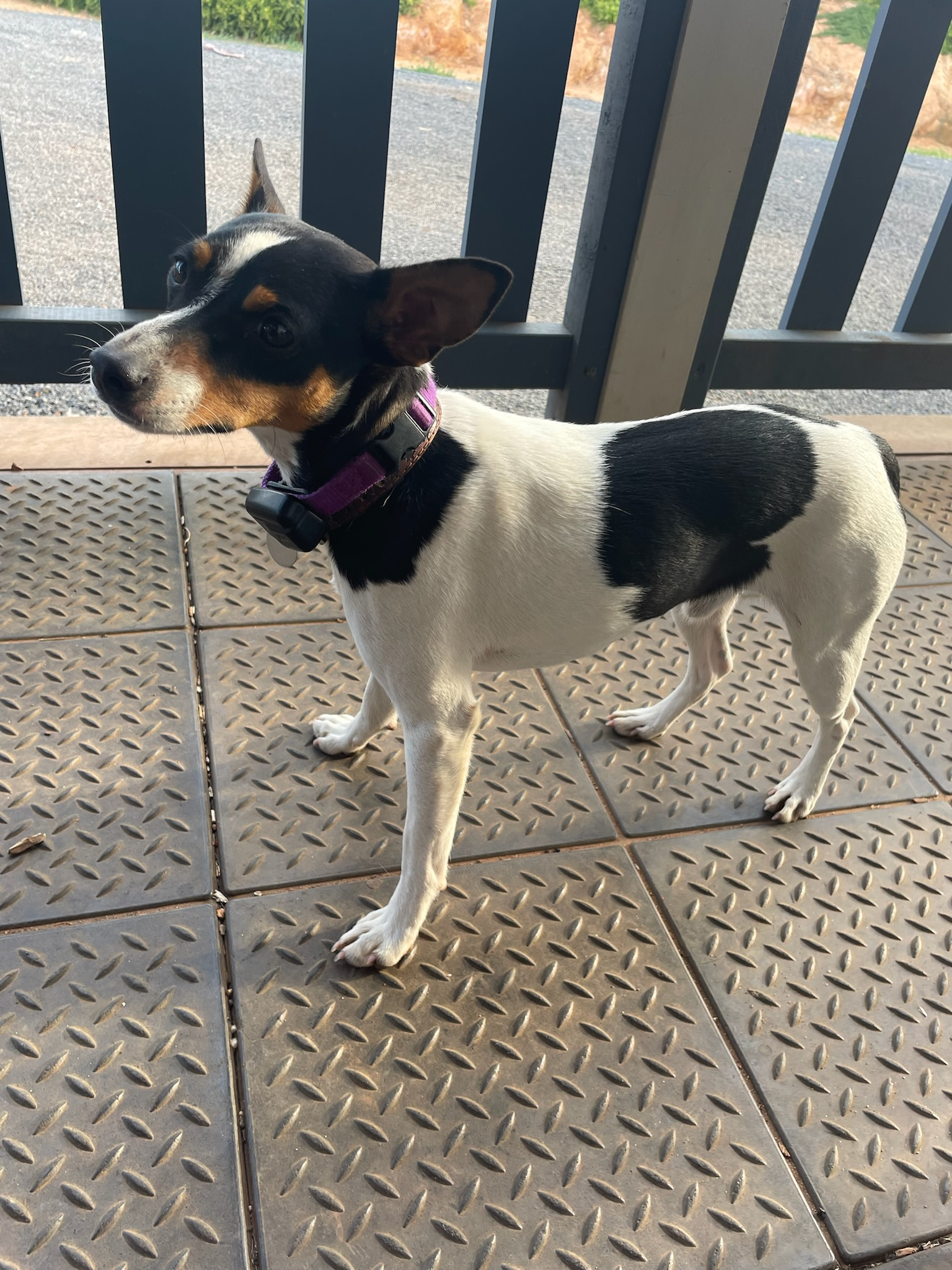
- Male tri-color Tenterfield Terrier]
- Origin: Australia
Kennel club standards
- ANKC: standard

The Tenterfield Terrier is a dog breed developed in Australia.

== History ==
The origin of the Tenterfield Terrier is not known. It is said that the Tenterfield Terrier breed originated from dogs that accompanied Australia's first European settlers who sailed from Portsmouth in the south of England. These dogs were pest and vermin killers, with the smallest of them selected to play that role on the European ships, thus leading to their arrival in Australia. It is also said that the smallest puppies from the litters of Fox Terriers were sometimes domestically selected such as for manouvreability in a hunting role, and even at times crossed with other small breeds to achieve a smaller size.

By the late 19th century a dog type known as the Miniature Fox Terrier (known colloquially as "Mini Foxies") was well established in rural Australia as a vermin killer and family companion. By the 1920s the dog had become a fixture in urban households.

The name "Tenterfield" is sometimes incorrectly stated to denote the breed's place of origin. Rather, it may have derived from a well known breeder. The dog was bred extensively in and around northern New South Wales. Tenterfield is one of many localities in Australia in which small terriers of this type were kept. The town of Tenterfield is significant in Australian history for the Tenterfield Oration on independence from Britain. Additionally, the owner of the town's saddlery a man named George Woolnough, was immortalized by his grandson entertainer Peter Allen as the "Tenterfield Saddler". Tenterfield residents attest that Mr. Woolnough owned and loved a number of these terriers, however, photographs of these dogs have not yet been discovered.

The name Tenterfield Terrier was suggested in the 1990s by television gardening personality Don Burke, and was adopted during the renaming of one of the then-Miniature Fox Terrier clubs.

== Health ==
A study looking at congenital hypothyroidism in the Tenterfield Terrier found a mutation in the R593W gene to be responsible, this mutation was identified in all affected dogs and 31% of clinically healthy Tenterfield Terriers. A test for the mutation in the R593W gene has been developed and released.

== See also ==
- List of dog breeds
- Miniature Fox Terrier
- Fox Terrier (Smooth)
