= Japanese Terrier =

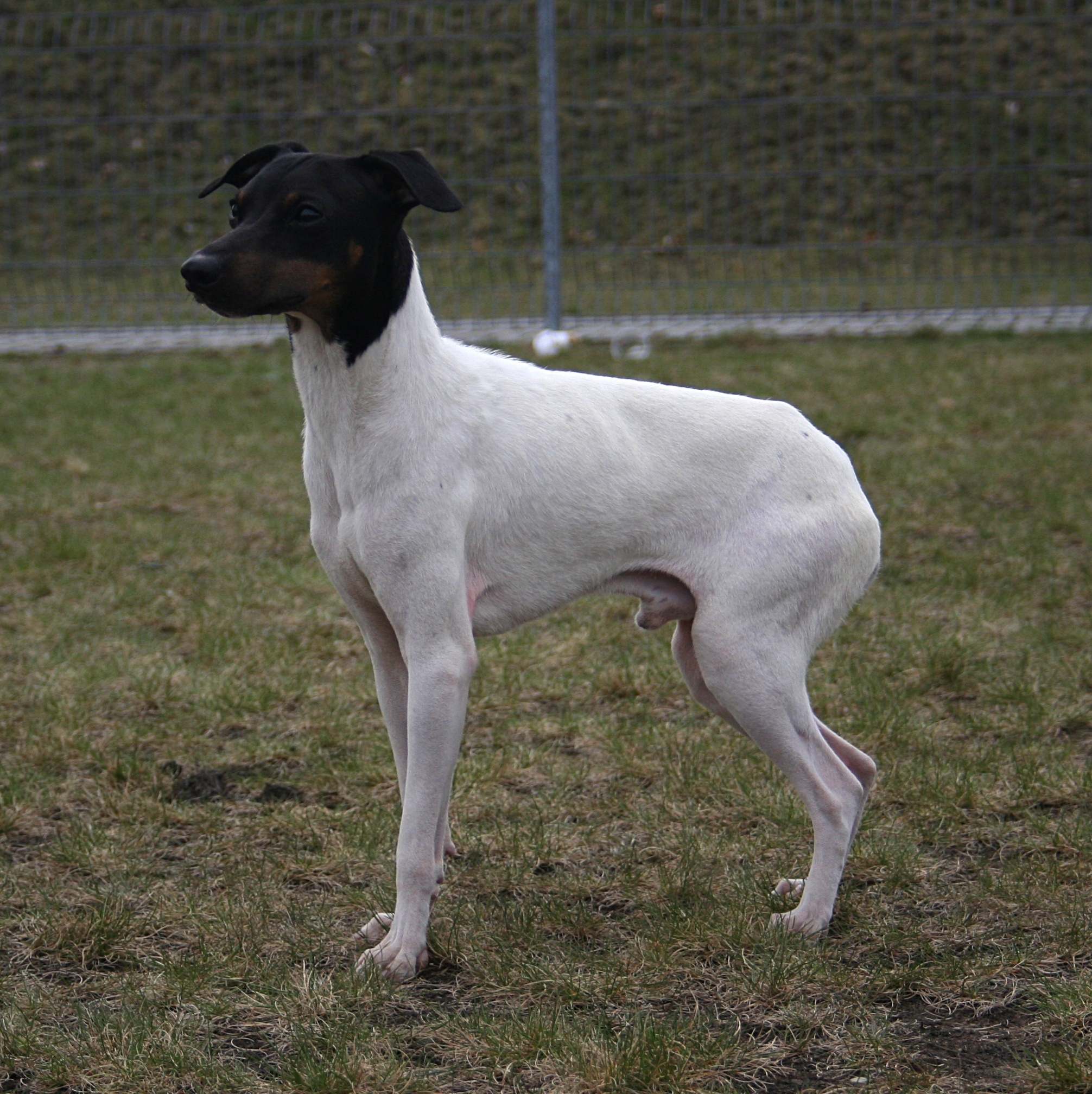
- Other names: Mikado Terrier; Oyuki (snowy) Terrier
- Origin: Japan
Traits
- Weight: 2.2–4.5 kg (5-10 lb)
Kennel club standards
- Japan Kennel Club: standard
- Fédération Cynologique Internationale: standard

The Japanese Terrier (日本テリア, Nihon Teria) is a small terrier native to Japan. It is believed to be descended from the progeny of Fox Terrier types, pointers and indigenous Japanese dogs. Aside from the Japanese Spitz, Japanese Chin, and Shiba Inu, it is also one of the smallest Japanese dog breeds.

== Appearance ==
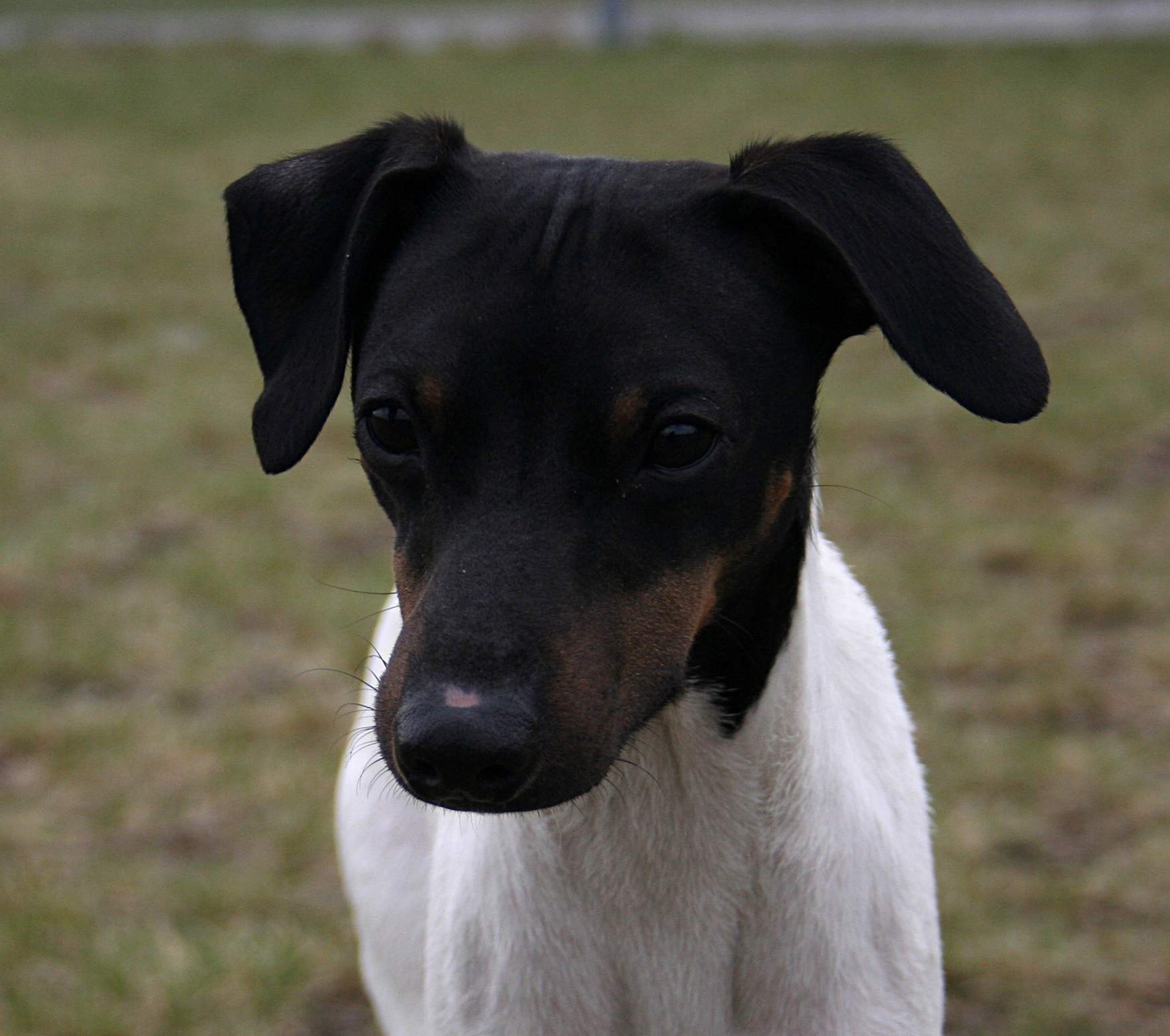
Japanese Terrier head

The Japanese Terrier most often has a black head and a predominantly white body with little black spots. The length of the Japanese Terrier is anywhere from 8 to 13 inches tall (to shoulders) and it typically weighs 5 to 10 pounds. Its ears are high set and fold forward, and the coat is short, slick and fine. Its tail can be docked.

== Temperament ==
The Fédération Cynologique Internationale (FCI) breed standard describes this breed as having "a lively and cheerful character" and as "swift and lively in temperament".

== History ==
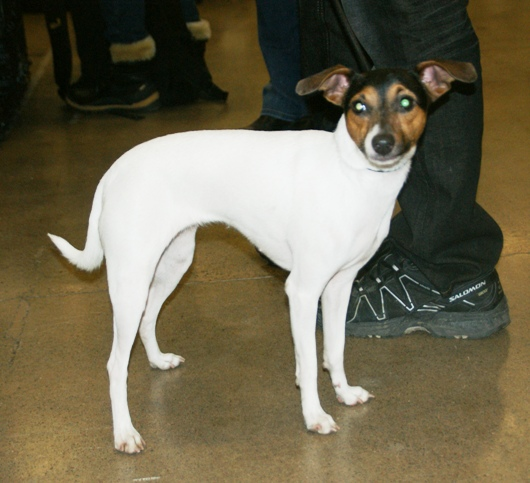
A female Japanese Terrier

The Japanese Terrier was bred in the 17th century by mating Smooth Fox Terriers, brought by Dutch merchant ships to Nagasaki, with small-sized pointers or small native Japanese dogs. By the 1900s, at the end of the Meiji Era, some of these dogs were seen in the Kobe streets, and were called the “Kobe Terriers”. The appearance of these “Kobe Terriers” was like a mix of the modern Smooth Fox Terriers and the Japanese Terriers. The dogs were then kept as lapdogs in other ports such as Kobe and Yokohama. Planned breeding did not begin until around 1920, and the Japanese Terrier was recognized by the Japan Kennel Club in 1930.

The Japanese Terrier was originally bred to hunt small game, such as rats and mice, and to provide companionship to their owners. The breed is known for its high energy and intelligence, making it a great choice for an active owner who is willing to provide plenty of exercise and mental stimulation. The breed is generally healthy, but can be prone to certain health issues, such as deafness and allergies. Regular veterinary check-ups and proper grooming are important for maintaining the health of the breed. Overall, the Japanese Terrier is a loyal and loving companion for those who are willing to provide it with the care and attention it needs.

On October 13, 2020, the Japanese Terrier was accepted into the American Kennel Club's Foundation Stock Service, an optional breed registry service the club provides for new purebred dog breeds that have been introduced to the US and are yet to be recognised by the AKC.

== See also ==
- List of dog breeds
