= English Toy Terrier (Black & Tan) =

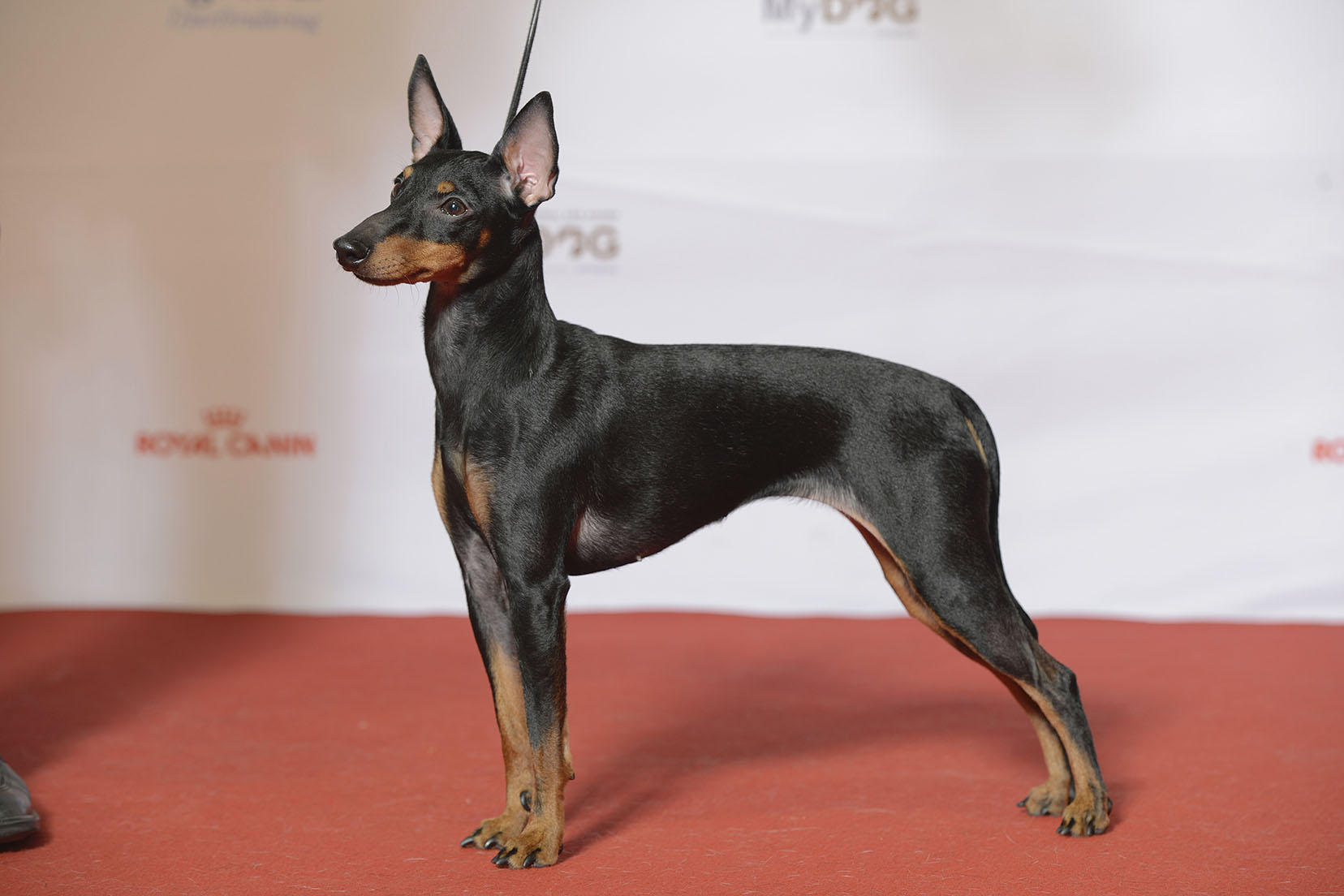
- English Toy Terrier
- Origin: England
Kennel club standards
- The Kennel Club: standard
- Fédération Cynologique Internationale: standard

The English Toy Terrier is a small breed of terrier in the toy dog group.

== Appearance ==
According to the Kennel Club (UK), the English Toy Terrier should be 25–30 cm (10–12 in) in height and 2.7–3.6 kg (6–8 lb) in weight. The only permitted color is black with defined tan markings on the legs, chest, and face. The movement is described as being like the extended trot of a horse. The English Toy Terrier has almond-shaped eyes and 'candle-flame' prick ears.

== History ==
The English Toy Terrier was developed from the Old English Black and Tan Terrier and is closely related to the larger Manchester Terrier. Fast and agile, its origins are in the world of the rat pit, a sport popular in the cities of Victorian England where terriers were placed in a circle or pit with a number of rats and bets were taken as to which dog would kill its quota of rats in the fastest time. Small dogs were highly prized, with the ideal being to produce the smallest dog still capable of killing its quota of rats in as short a time as possible. In 1848 a Black and Tan Terrier named Tiny the Wonder, weighing just 5 1/2 pounds (2.5 kg), is recorded to have killed 200 rats in less than an hour.

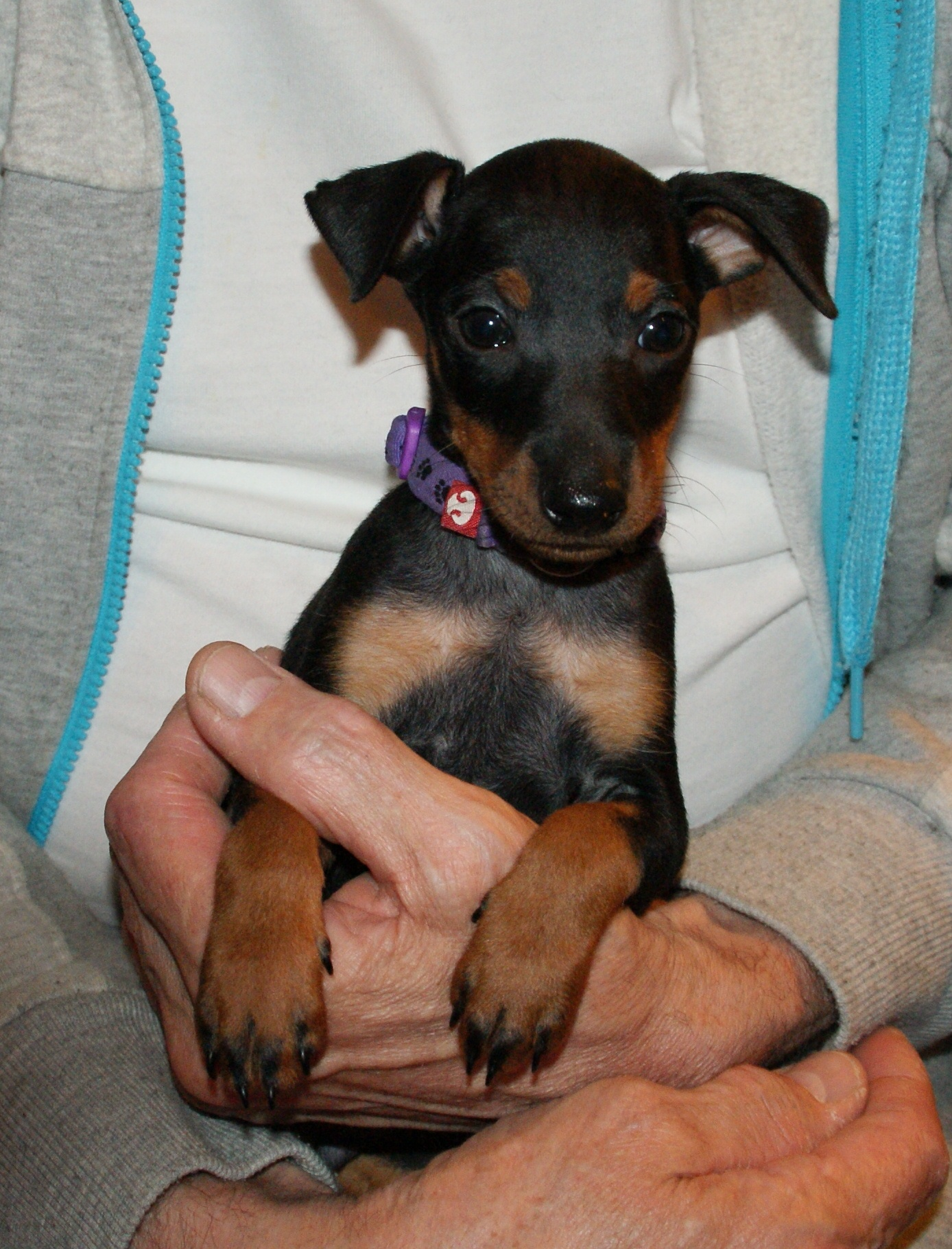
An English Toy Terrier Puppy

The outlawing of this sport coincided with the formation of the Kennel Club. With its elegant appearance, the Black and Tan Terrier moved into the conformation show ring. At the first all-breeds dog show, there was a very respectable entry of Black and Tan Terriers divided by weight. This weight division continued with two varieties of Black and Tan Terrier until 1903 when the 1st Black and Tan Terrier (Miniature) was registered with the KC. The current name English Toy Terrier (Black & Tan) was adopted in 1960. Black and Tan Terriers of all sizes were exported to Canada and the US, founding a population which was largely isolated from the European one until very recently. In North America, the two sizes were also split into two breeds until 1958 when declining numbers of the Standard Manchester Terrier prompted the American Kennel Club to redefine them as a single breed with two varieties: Standard and Toy.

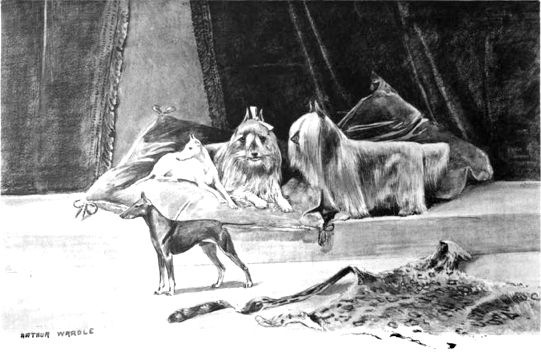
English Toy Terriers in 1894 with another very popular toy dog of the Victorian era, the Paisley Terrier

== Concerns of extinction ==
The English Toy Terrier is on the Kennel Club (UK)'s list of vulnerable native breeds with an average of only 86 pups registered every year (data from 2016-26). A great effort is being made by breeders to boost the popularity of the breed and develop a viable gene pool. The Kennel Club (UK) has opened the stud book, allowing the North American Toy Manchester Terrier to be re-registered as the English Toy Terrier (Black & Tan), provided it is certified to be of the Toy variety and not of the Standard variety. Some owners in Great Britain are against this decision; others see it as a positive way to preserve the breed.

== See also ==
- List of dog breeds
- Russkiy Toy
