= Terrier =

Dog type

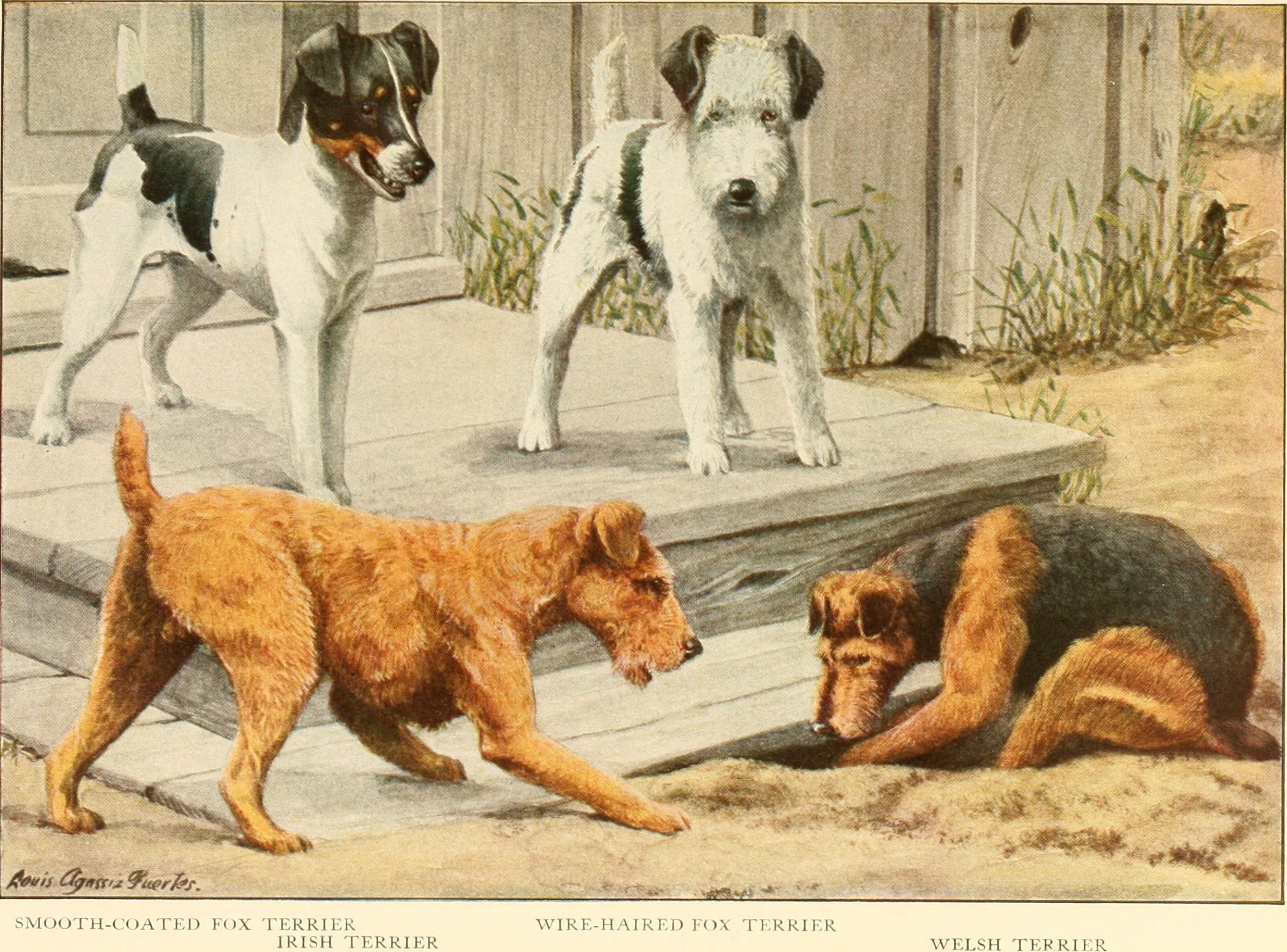
Some terrier breeds, from The book of dogs; an intimate study of mankind's best friend, 1919

Terrier (from Latin terra 'earth') is a type of dog originally bred to hunt vermin. A terrier is a dog of any one of many breeds or landraces of the terrier type, which are typically small, wiry, game, and fearless. There are five different groups of terrier, with each group having different shapes and sizes.

== History ==
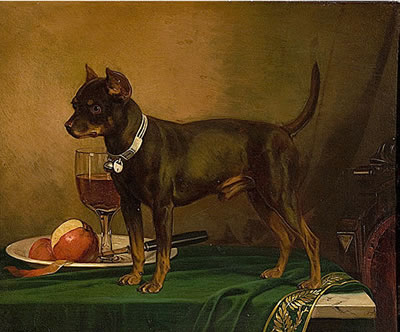
A painting of an English Toy Terrier by Frederick August Wenderoth in 1865

Most terrier breeds were refined from the older purpose-bred dogs. The name originated from Old French chien terrier, literally "earth dog".

The gameness of the early hunting terriers was exploited by using them in sporting contests. Initially, terriers competed in events such as clearing a pit of rats. The dog that was the fastest in killing all the rats won. In the eighteenth century some terriers were crossed with hounds to improve their hunting, and some with fighting dog breeds to "intensify tenacity and increase courage". Some of the crosses with fighting dogs, bull and terrier crosses, were used in the blood sport of dog-fighting. Modern pet breeds such as the Miniature Bull Terrier are listed by the Fédération Cynologique Internationale (FCI) under Bull type terriers.

Today, most terriers are kept as companion dogs and family pets. They are generally loyal and affectionate to their owners.

== Types and groups ==
In the 18th century in Britain, only two types of terriers were recognized, long-legged and short-legged. Today, terriers are often informally categorized by size or by function.

Hunting-types are still used to find, track, or trail quarry, especially underground, and sometimes to bolt the quarry. Modern examples include the Jack Russell Terrier, the Jagdterrier, the Rat Terrier, and the Patterdale Terrier. There are also the short-legged terriers such as the Cairn Terrier, the Scottish Terrier, and the West Highland White Terrier, which were also used to kill small vermin.

The original hunting terriers include the Fell Terrier (developed in northern England to assist in the killing of foxes) and the Hunt Terrier (developed in southern England to locate, kill or bolt foxes during a traditional mounted fox hunt).

The various combinations of bulldog and terrier that were used for bull-baiting and dog-fighting in the late 19th century were later refined into separate breeds that combined both terrier and bulldog qualities. Except for the Boston Terrier, they are generally included in kennel clubs' Terrier Group. Breeders have bred modern bull-type terrier breeds, such as the Bull Terrier and Staffordshire Bull Terrier, into suitable family dogs and show terriers.

Toy terriers have been bred from larger terriers and are shown in the Toy or Companion group. Included among these breeds are the English Toy Terrier, Toy Fox Terrier and the Yorkshire Terrier. While small, they retain true terrier character and are not submissive "lap dogs".

Other descendants of the bull and terrier types, such as the Asian Gull Terrier, are among the dogs still raised for dog-fighting.

=== Appearance ===
Terriers range greatly in appearance from very small, light bodied, smooth coated dogs such as the English Toy Terrier (Black and Tan), which weighs as little as 2.7 kg (6 lb), to the very large rough-coated Airedale Terriers, which can be up to 25 kg (56 lb) or more. As of 2004, the United Kennel Club recognized a new hairless breed of terrier derived from the Rat Terrier called the American Hairless Terrier.

== Kennel club classification ==
When competing in conformation shows, most kennel clubs including the Fédération Cynologique Internationale group pedigree terrier breeds together in their own terrier group. The Fédération Cynologique Internationale grouped Terriers in Group 3.

== See also ==
- Bull-type terriers
- Working terriers
