= Rat Terrier =

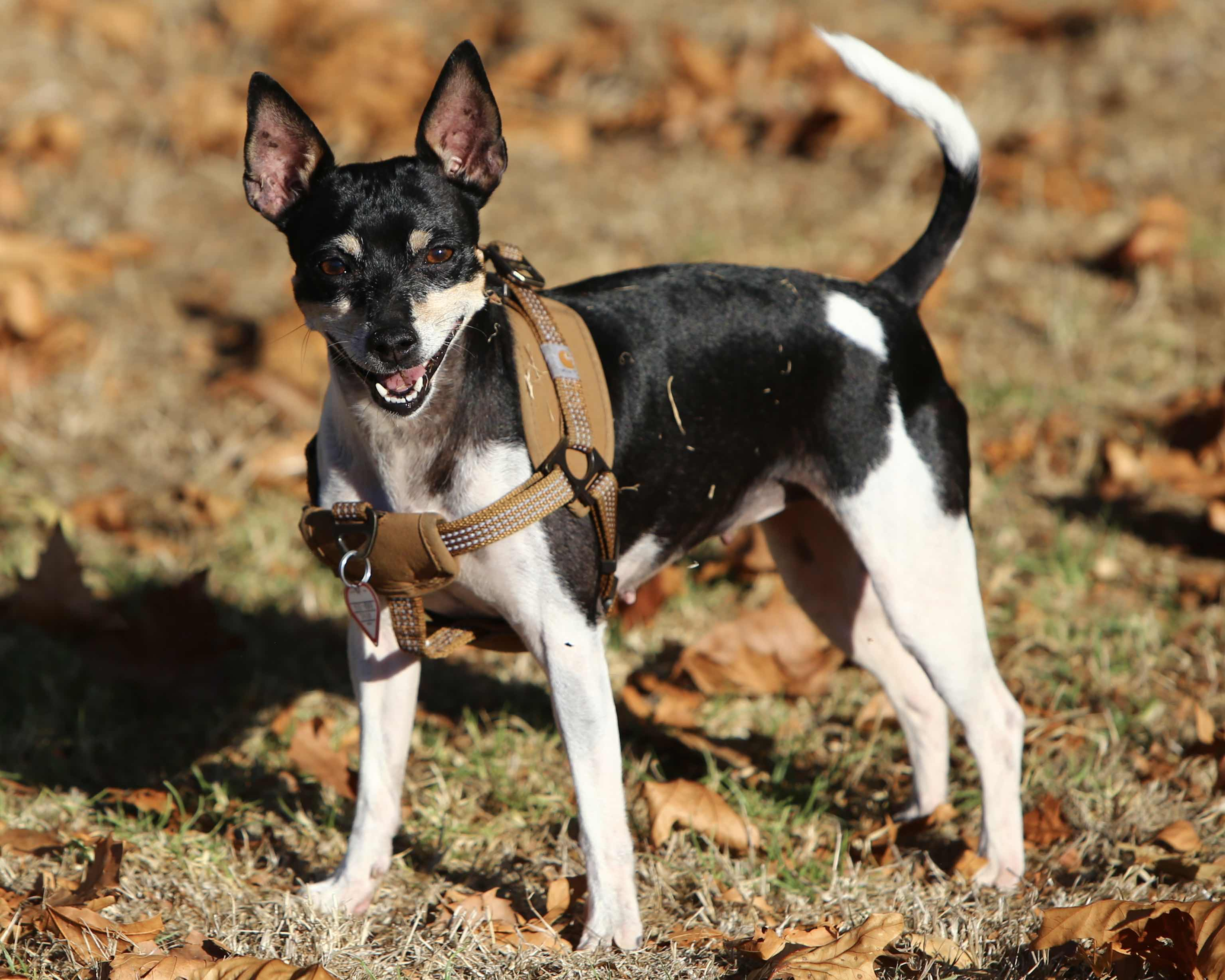
- An adult female Rat Terrier with natural undocked tail

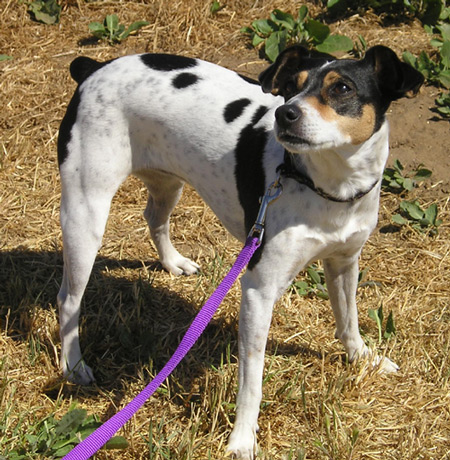
- Tricolor Rat Terrier with docked tail; note pale black ticking on white coat
- Other names: American Rat Terrier; Ratting Terrier; Decker Giant
- Common nicknames: RT; Rat; Rattie
Traits
- Height: 10–18 inches (25–46 cm)
- Weight: 10–25 pounds (4.5–11.3 kg)
- Coat: Single, smooth
- Color: Black, tan, chocolate, blue, grey Isabella (pearl), lemon and apricot. May be tri-color or bi-color, with at least one color being white
Kennel club standards
- United Kennel Club: standard

The Rat Terrier is an American dog breed with a background as a farm dog and hunting companion. They share much ancestry with the small hunting dogs known as feists. Common throughout family farms in the 1920s and 1930s, they are now recognized by the United (UKC) and American Kennel Clubs (AKC) and are considered a rare breed.

== Health ==
Due to regular outcrossings throughout the Rat Terrier's history, overall it is a very hardy breed. However, with its growth in popularity in recent years some issues are becoming more common. The Canine Health Information Center (CHIC) recommends that Rat Terriers be tested for patellar luxation, cardiac abnormalities, pancreatic issues, hip dysplasia, and Legg–Calvé–Perthes disease.

== History ==
The earliest-known record of a rat-catching dog is that of "Hatch", whose remains were recovered from the Mary Rose, the flagship of Henry VIII, sunk in 1545 and raised in 1982. Hatch is thought to have been a mongrel, and was brought on board to control the rat population.

One source claims that during a competition in England, a single terrier killed 2,501 rats over a seven-hour period in a rat-infested barn – an average of one rat every ten seconds.

== Breed recognition ==
The UKC officially recognized the breed on January 1, 1999. The AKC recognized the Rat Terrier as a breed on July 1, 2010; however, it allowed them to compete in companion events beginning January 1, 2006 in sanctioned AKC Companion events (Obedience, Agility, Rally). The first Rat Terrier to earn a title under AKC Sanctioning was in Agility on January 14, 2006 in Van Nuys, California by Harpur's Giddy Upp "Gigi" and D. Davidson Harpur.

== See also ==
- List of dog breeds
