= Rats in New York City =

Rodent infestation

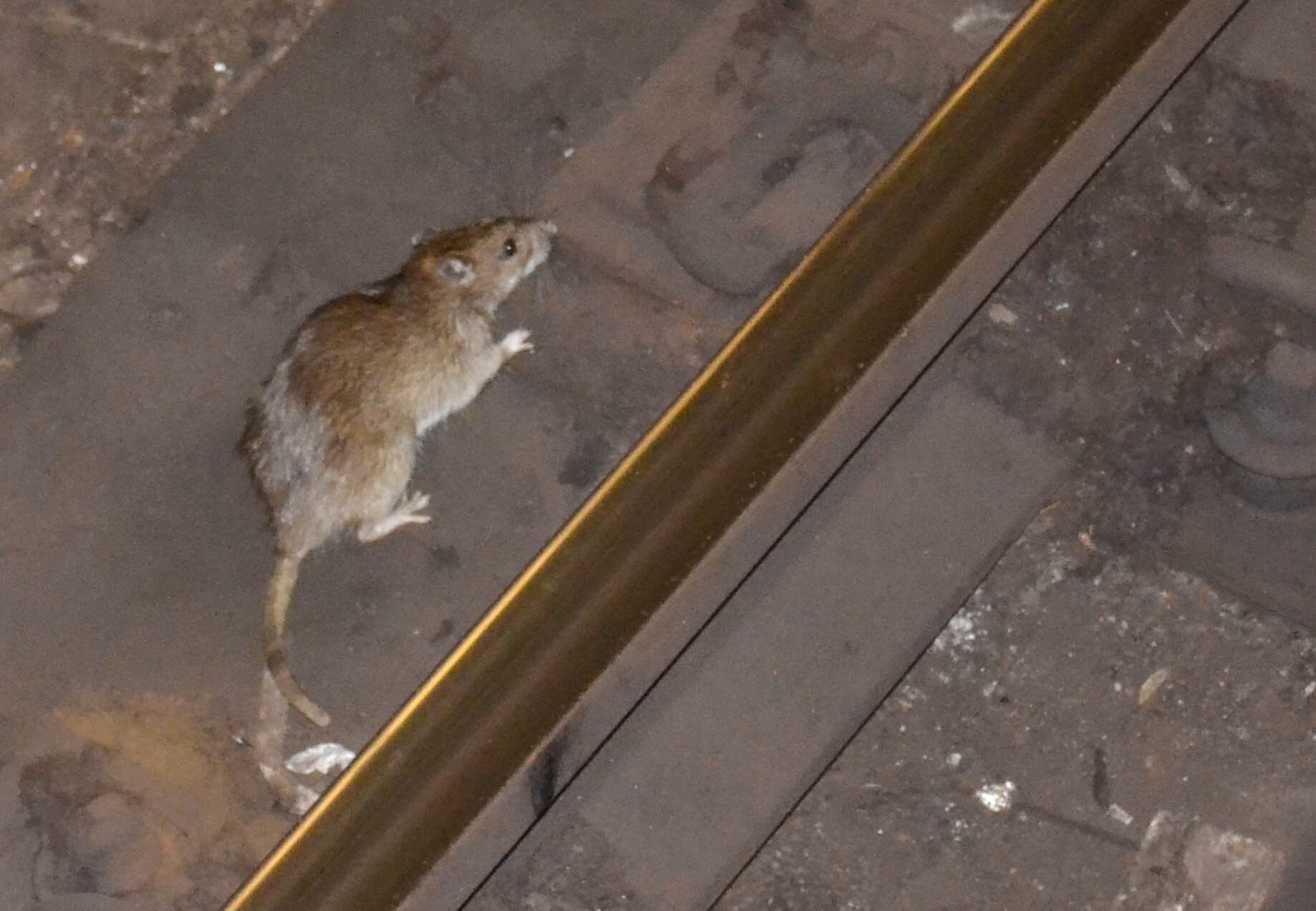
A rat in the New York City Subway

Rats in New York City are widespread, as they are in many densely populated areas. They are considered a cultural symbol of the city. For a long time, the number of rats in New York City was unknown, and a common urban legend declared there were up to five times as many rats as people. However, a 2023 study estimates that there are approximately 3 million rats in New York, which is close to a third of New York's human population.

The city's rat population is dominated by the brown rat (also known as the Norway rat). The average adult body weight is 350 grams (12 oz) in males and about 250 grams (8.8 oz) in females. The adult rat can squeeze through holes or gaps 1 inch (25 mm) wide, jump a horizontal distance of up to 4 feet (1.2 m) (or vertically from a flat surface to 3 feet (0.91 m)), survive a fall from a height of almost 40 feet (12 m), and hold their breath for 3 minutes.

New York City rats carry pathogens that can cause diarrhea, vomiting, and fever in humans – especially in children. The pathogens they carry include bacteria such as Clostridioides difficile (C. diff), Salmonella, E. coli, and Leptospira. Bartonella bacteria cause cat scratch disease, trench fever, and Carrion disease. These bacteria may be spread through contact with rat saliva, urine or feces. Rats can carry disease-causing viruses such as sapoviruses, cardioviruses, kobuviruses, parechoviruses, rotaviruses, hepaciviruses, and Seoul virus. Rats may carry fleas that are vectors of diseases such as bubonic plague, typhus, and spotted fever. In addition, some people have an allergic reaction to the presence of rodent hair, urine or feces.

== Description ==
=== Species ===
Rarely seen in daylight, rats have been reported in New York City since early colonial days. As recently as 1944, two distinct species were prevalent: the brown rat (Norway rat) and the black rat (ship rat, roof rat). Over the next few decades, the larger and more aggressive brown variety displaced the black rats, typically by attacking and killing them, but also by out-competing them for food and shelter. By 2014, the city's rat population was dominated by the brown rat.

The brown rat is 16 to 20 inches (410 to 510 mm) long and weighs 1 to 2 pounds (450 to 910 g). It is brown or gray in color with a lighter-colored belly. It is nocturnal, and sleeps approximately 10 hours a day. The black rat is between 5 and 7 inches (130 and 180 mm) long (not including the tail) and weighs between 2.5 and 8 ounces (71 and 227 g). It is usually black to light brown in color with a lighter-colored belly.

=== Population ===
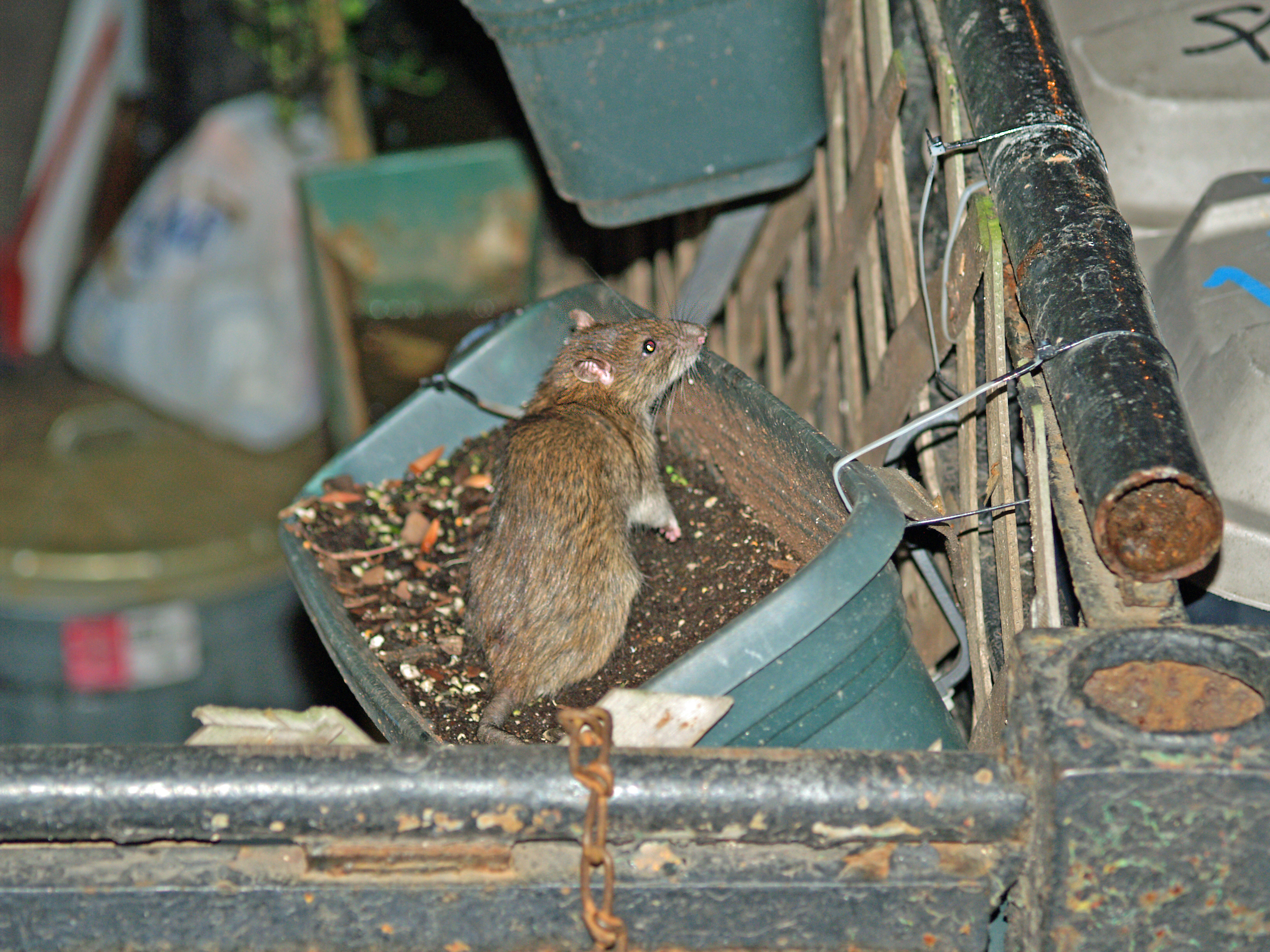
A rat in a flower pot

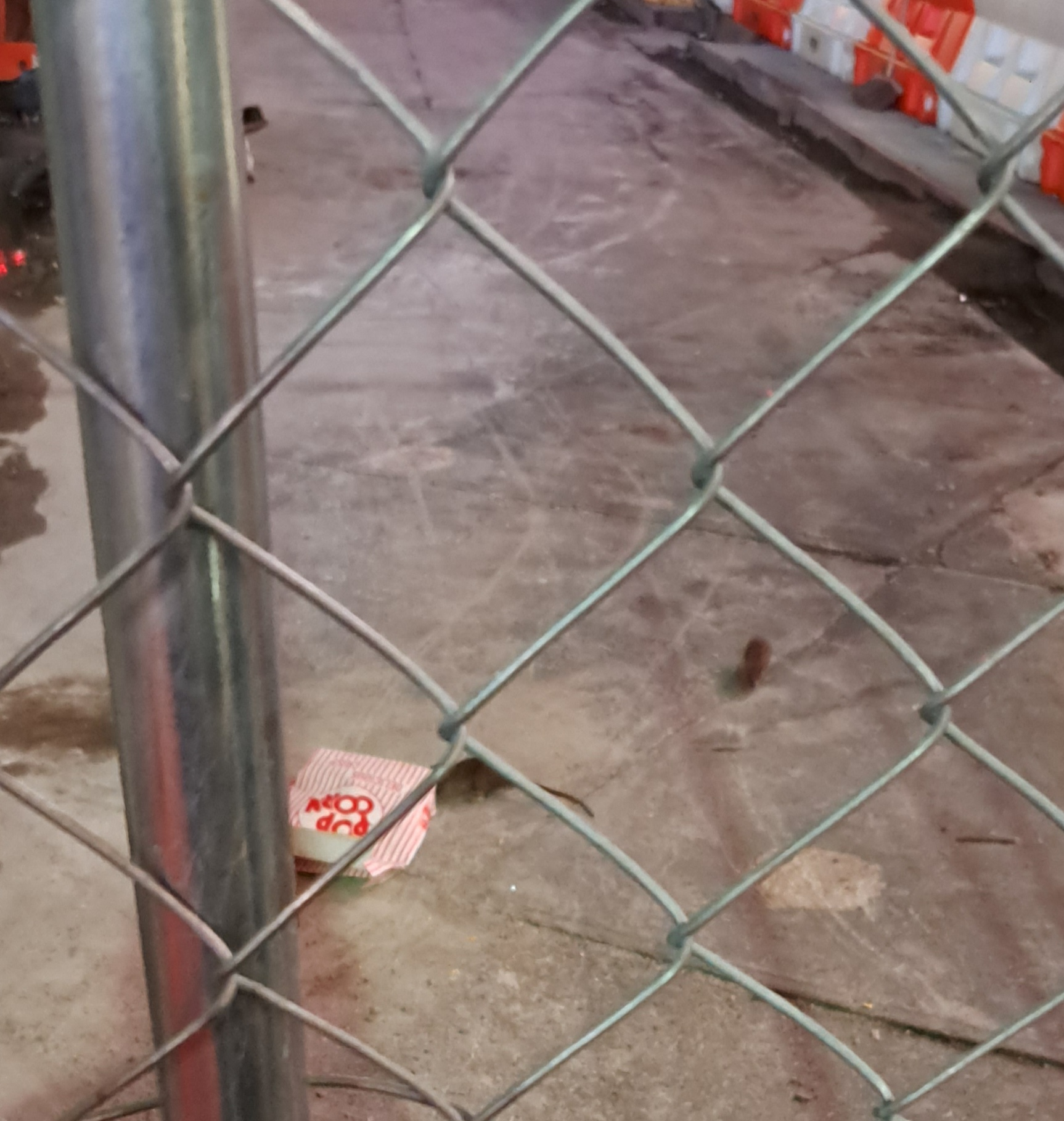
Rats eating popcorn at the New York Penn Station

Rats are elusive by nature, and public health officials have not developed any reliable way to estimate their numbers. However, a 2014 study by Jonathan Auerbach, which was reported in the Royal Statistical Society's Significance magazine, estimated that there were closer to 2 million rats in the city. In 2023, another study by pest control company MMPC using Auerbach's methodology estimated that the rat population has since increased to nearly 3 million. This is close to a third of New York's human population. It conflicts with the often-repeated statistic that there are more rats than people in the five boroughs of New York City (8.5 million in 2023), with some estimates putting the number of rats far higher at as many as five rats per person (33.6 million).

In 2014, the television channel Animal Planet named New York City the "Worst Rat City in the World". Compared to other cities within the United States, studies indicate New York is particularly well-suited for rats. This conclusion is based on characteristics such as human population patterns, public sanitation practices, climate, housing construction standards and other variables. Experts consider that the actual population of rats varies, depending on climate, sanitation practices, efforts to control the population, and season.

=== Genetics ===
Studies have repeatedly failed to find restricted gene flow in Manhattan's rats due to the island's buildings. However Combs et al. (2018) presents a more geographically detailed analysis. They find that the island's buildings are restricting gene flow, especially in Midtown. Combs et al. found that there were genetically distinct clusters of rats north of 59th Street (in Upper Manhattan) and south of 14th Street (in Lower Manhattan), although both clusters were likely descended from rats imported from Britain.

=== Food and shelter ===
Rats only require 1 ounce (28 g) of food and water a day to live. The rodents primarily find food and shelter at human habitations and therefore interact with humans in various ways. In particular, the city's rats adapt to practices and habits among New Yorkers for disposing of food waste. Curbside overnight garbage disposal from residences, stores, subway and restaurants, as well as littering, contribute to the sustenance of the city's rats. Rats nearly always use the same routes to their food sources. Rat infestations have increased as a result of budget reductions and more wasteful disposal of food.

Rats burrow underground or create nests in suitable soft material, with a small group of rats in each nest. Brown rats in New York City prefer to live at ground level or basement level. They congregate in colonies of 30 to 50 rats. Rats live 100 feet (30 m) to 400 feet (120 m) from their food source.

=== Habits ===
Unlike many mammals, the rat's skull is not plated together. This means it can change the shape of its head to squeeze through holes or gaps as small as a quarter (0.955 inches (24.3 mm)). They are able to leap 4 feet (1.2 m) laterally and can fall five floors without any injuries. An adult rat can tread water for three days. They typically travel tight, well-worn paths. Each litter has up to a dozen pups. Rats can mate at the age of two or three months and then produce a new litter every two months. The rats live for approximately one year, mostly due to predation rather than natural lifespan. They rarely travel more than 600 feet (180 m) from where they were born.

== Public health ==
The greatest danger posed to humans from rats is the diseases that the latter can transmit. City-dwelling rats carry pathogens that can cause diarrhea and vomiting in humans. Disease-causing bacteria commonly carried by rats include E. coli, Clostridioides difficile (C. diff), and Salmonella. The bacteria can be spread by contact with rat saliva, urine or feces. Viral diseases spread by rats include rat-bite fever and hemorrhagic fevers caused by Seoul hantavirus.

A survey conducted by Columbia University's Mailman School of Public Health in 2014 studied 133 brown rats from residential buildings in Manhattan. The rats carried numerous pathogens that can cause serious illness in humans, including bacteria (Salmonella and E. coli) that cause food poisoning and dermatitis, pathogens that cause fevers (such as Seoul hantavirus and Leptospira), sapoviruses, cardioviruses, kobuviruses, parechoviruses, rotaviruses, Hepacivirus A, and hepaciviruses, including some never before seen in New York. While at least 18 of the viruses found are known to cause disease in humans, it is unclear how infectious the rats are to residents. Peter Daszak, president of EcoHealth Alliance, a nonprofit scientific organization that researches links between human health and wildlife, called the study "shocking and surprising". Given the close quarters shared by rats and New York City residents, he found it to be "a recipe for a public health nightmare".

A 2015 joint study by Columbia University and Cornell University found that the rats are commonly infested with fleas, lice, and mites that carry bacteria that can cause disease in humans, including bubonic plague, typhus, and spotted fever. They found an average of five fleas per rat, a sharp increase from a 1925 study that found one out of five rats had no fleas at all. Bartonella pathogens (which can cause cat scratch disease, trench fever, and Carrion disease) and various viruses were also found in New York City's rats in this study. These results were confirmed by a study published in 2015 in the Journal of Medical Entomology. A higher risk of allergies and asthma is linked to exposure to rodent hair, droppings, and urine, especially in children.

The NYC Health Department recommends that people bitten by a rat seek immediate medical attention, as bacteria from the rat's teeth can cause tetanus as well as rat-bite fever, which can be fatal.

== Control ==
The New York City Department of Health handles enforcement of rat infestation problems in New York City. Local authorities in New York have long recognized that eliminating rats from the city is unrealistic, but have made various efforts to control their prevalence. The approach has traditionally been reactive: after receiving complaints of infestation, officials would commence control efforts at that site by placing rodent poison, traps, or contraceptives.

In recent years, the city adopted a more proactive approach to rodent control known as integrated pest management, which focuses on preventive measures. Such efforts include developing a rodent control map using geotagging to focus countermeasures more systematically, instituting a "Rodent Control Academy" that trains city employees on rat behavior and control, and emphasizing building integrity and garbage disposal. In 2009, the Health Department began offering a half-day course in combating rat infestations. In 2010, the city cut its budget for rodent control programs by $1.5 million to help reduce an overall deficit of $2 billion.

In 2013, it was announced that New York municipal authorities would implement a plan for mass sterilization of the city's rats, using a chemical to neutralize the reproductive systems of female rats. Bait stations loaded with the chemical were to be deployed. The chemical's effects were to gradually shrink the number of pups a female rat can have in a litter, eventually rendering them infertile.

The Upper West Side and the Upper East Side logged the most rat complaints to the Health Department from 2010 to mid-2014. In 2014 the Health Department hired 9 new inspectors to augment its staff of 45. With $611,000 in funding, the new squad was tasked with targeting major infestations in the South Bronx and Manhattan.

Private groups, such as Ryders Alley Trencher-fed Society, conducts rat hunts in New York using dogs.

=== City-led control efforts ===
New York City property owners and managing agents are legally responsible for keeping their properties rat-free through maintenance measures and the use of pest control professionals. Conditions both inside and outside of buildings, including on public property, that contribute to or allow the establishment of rat populations constitute violations of Article 151 of the Health Code.

Maintenance measures include proper storage of garbage, removal of water sources, and elimination of environments suitable for nesting. Garbage cans need to be rat-resistant and made out of metal rather than plastic. Because rats easily chew through plastic, the Health Department recommends placing plastic garbage bags inside rat-resistant metal garbage cans. Garbage should be placed out on the street close to the pickup time, rather than the night before. It also becomes important to keep garbage that are in parks inside litter cans, and not feeding birds or any of the surrounding wildlife that could potentially attract them.

New York City publishes a guide for property owners and tenants, entitled Preventing Rats on Your Property: A Guide for Property Owners and Tenants, that discusses how the Health Department inspects for rats, and how to control rats, including looking for evidence, cleaning up, starving them, shutting them out, and wiping them out. The guide covers the use of traps, rat poison, and wire mesh at the base of trees, as well as the new rules for garbage pickup, with landlords bringing out garbage in the morning immediately prior to pickup rather than the night before. Rodent baiting is suggested as an effective approach to wiping out rats.

New York City property owners and residents are advised to watch for signs of infestation like gnawed wood and plastic and evidence of rat trails. Property should be inspected to look for entry points such as gaps around pipes.

An online map created by the New York City Department of Health enables people to search specific addresses for rat issues. The Village Voice asked readers to email them about incidents of rat sightings.

=== Government complaints and inspections ===
New York City rodent complaints can be made online, by filling out the New York City Rodent Complaint Form, or by dialing 3-1-1.

The New York City guide Preventing Rats on Your Property discusses how the NYC Health Department, through its Pest Control Services program, inspects private and public properties for rats. Property owners that fail an inspection receive a Health Department Commissioner's Order and have five days to correct the problem. If, after five days, the property fails a second inspection, the owner receives a Notice of Violation and can be fined. If the Health Department feels it must itself exterminate or clean up the property, the property owner is billed (about $1,000 a day in 2004). Unpaid charges become a priority lien against the building, preventing property owners from selling with a clean legal title. Failure to comply with an order of the Commissioner is a misdemeanor, and subjects the landlord to criminal prosecution, a fine and/or imprisonment, as well as additional civil penalties. The penalty for each rodent violation was as high as $2,000 in 2004.

In 2014, New York City Comptroller Scott Stringer criticized the Health Department as "weak" in investigating and fixing residents' rat complaints. From fiscal year 2012 to fiscal year 2013, pest complaints, including rat problems, increased 10 percent in the city, and 24 percent of the time Health Department workers failed to inspect the complaints in the 10-day target period, an audit by the comptroller found. In 160 cases, the Health Department failed to carry out any field inspection. Caroline Bragdon at the Department of Health said: "The inspection is only as good as the inspector on that day and time. If you feel we're really missing the boat, which sometimes we do, let your community board and elected officials know."

=== Governmental attempts to mitigate infestations ===
In July 2000, the mayoral administration of Rudy Giuliani established a rat abatement task force in response to increasing rat-infestation complaints. The task force was headed by "rat czar" Joe Lhota. Manhattan borough president C. Virginia Fields simultaneously created a "rat complaint hot line" where Manhattan residents could report rats; this effort was criticized by Lhota, who said the city government already had its own hotline. Later in 2000, the city government proposed new laws that targeted rat infestations. After several months of hearings, a New York City Council committee recommended creating a permanent agency to combat rat infestations in February 2001.

The mayoral administration of Bill de Blasio launched a $400,000 pilot program in the mid-2010s to combat rat infestations in parks, the subway, and sewers. De Blasio allocated $2.9 million to reduce rat infestations in 2015, following the success of that program. In July 2017, the New York City government announced a $32 million rat reduction plan in which it initially aimed to reduce rat infestations by 70% by the end of 2018. The plan would alleviate rat infestations in East Village, Chinatown, and the Lower East Side in Lower Manhattan; Concourse in the Bronx; and Bedford–Stuyvesant and Bushwick in Brooklyn. These neighborhoods were chosen because they had high numbers of rat complaints in the past. The plan included installing padding or tiling on dirt floors in the basements of apartment buildings, installing solar-powered rat-proof trash cans, as well as increased trash management. In addition, de Blasio proposed suffocating rats by pouring dry ice into their burrows.

Rat sightings increased 71 percent from 2020 to 2023, prompting the City Council to propose a Rat Action Plan in July 2022, with five pieces of legislation. A revised plan was passed that October, consisting of four laws that aimed to reduce rodent infestations in the city. As part of the plan, the city government began looking for a director of rodent mitigation in late 2022. The government also announced in March 2023 that it would create eight "rat-mitigation zones" in neighborhoods with particularly severe rat infestations. That April, mayor Eric Adams appointed New York City's first director of rodent mitigation: former elementary school teacher Kathleen Corradi, who developed New York City's Zero Waste Schools initiative and led the Education Department's rodent reduction efforts. The same month, the city started requiring that building superintendents bring their garbage to the curb at 8 p.m., rather than at 4 p.m., on garbage collection days. Between August 2023 and March 2024, the city implemented rules requiring all businesses to put out trash within sturdy bins on garbage collection days.

== Notable incidents ==
=== Notable restaurant infestations ===
In February 2007, a morning news program featured a live report of a pack of rats overrunning a joint Taco Bell-KFC fast food restaurant in Greenwich Village. Inside the restaurant, numerous rats so severely infested the restaurant that they were visible in groups from the street, through the windows. Owners of the store reassured customers that the infestation was an isolated incident, but neighborhood residents interviewed stated that the franchise had exhibited a consistent presence of rats. Though the city's Department of Health and Mental Hygiene ordered both restaurants to stay closed, both storefronts gathered crowds, who came to observe the sheer quantity of rats inside the stores. While Health Department officials investigated the Taco Bell-KFC, it was uncovered that the restaurant had passed health inspections as recently as a week before the infestation. Following the infestation, the restaurant was officially closed by the Health Department, and it was reported that the restaurant had only previously passed health inspections by having rat droppings and not live rats, leading some to call for stricter measurements on health inspections. In March 2023, a couple reported finding a whole rat in their delivery order from a K-Town restaurant, Gammeeok. Prior to this event, the restaurant received several health code violations including, "establishment is not free of harborage or conditions conducive to rodents, insects, or pests."

=== Notable dwelling infestations ===
Rats in New York City have been observed on multiple occasions entering dwellings through plumbing and emerging from the toilet. Pest control experts say that many rats have no problem climbing through pipes. Though the most memorable incidents involve rats entering the bowl of the toilet or even leaving the toilet, it is not uncommon for them to become trapped in the pipes and die. Plumbers in New York are allegedly so used to dealing with rats in toilets, that they appear completely unfazed and even make jokes. Rats prefer means of entry which give them close proximity to food, which plumbing pipes do not, however, the change of rat behavior during the COVID-19 pandemic has caused an increase in toilet rats. Though most toilet rat infestations are facilitated by uncapped pipes, which are often not in the control of tenants, plumbers say the best way to hinder toilet rats is to leave the lid closed when not in use.

=== Attacks on infants ===
Babies are frequent victims, especially if left alone with food or a bottle. In 1860, The New York Times reported that a newborn infant had died subsequent to rats eating part of its face and one foot. The NYC Health Department undertook an anti-rat campaign in 1921 that involved rat-proofing as well as trapping and killing rats. Rats have been frequently known to have bitten infants and young children to get food off their faces.

=== Destruction of infrastructure ===
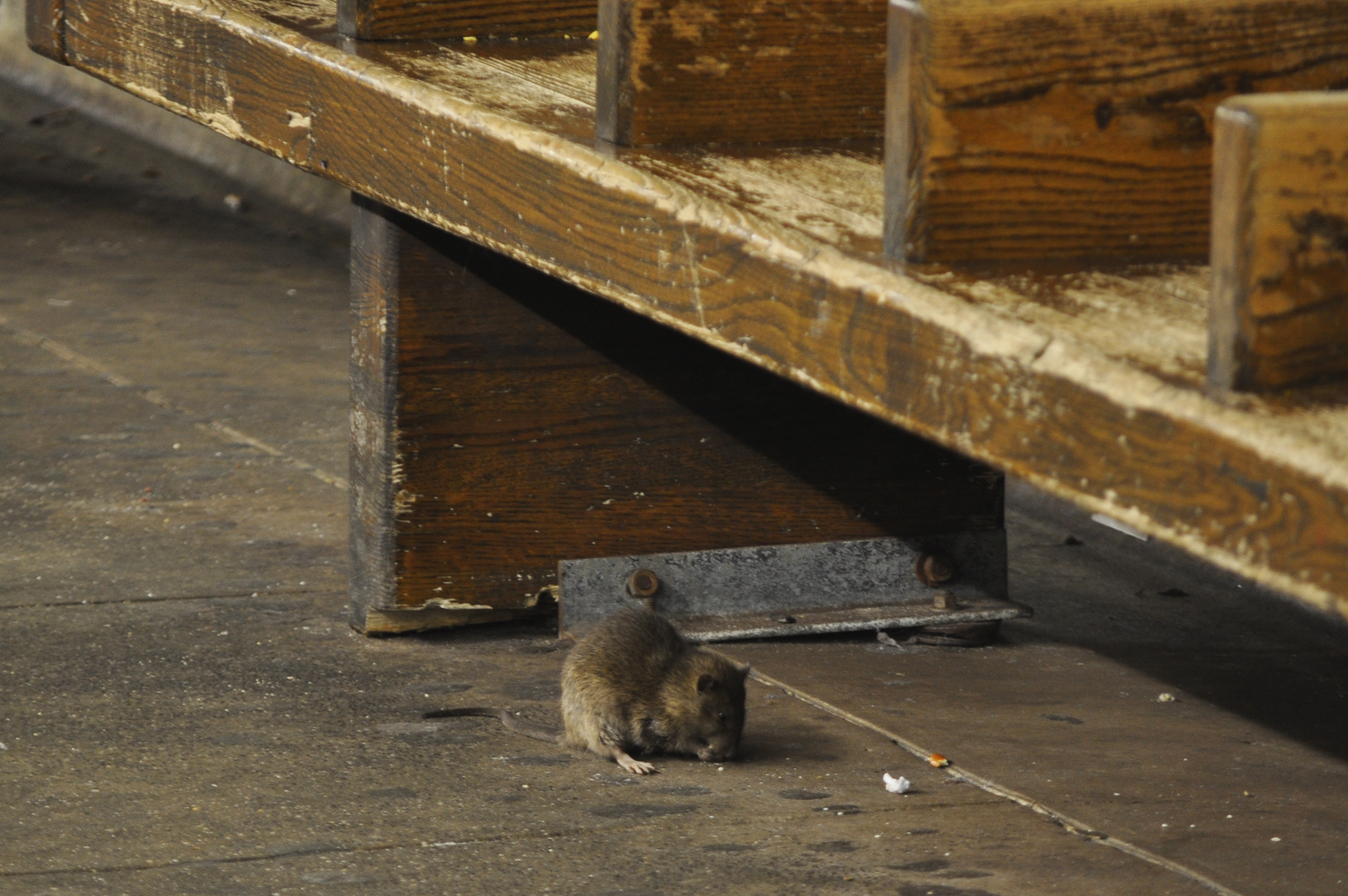
Rat by subway bench

In August 2003, a fire station at 153-11 Hillside Avenue in Queens was condemned and gutted after rats had taken over the building. After exterminators visited the building 26 times between March 2003 and August 2003, the building was eventually evacuated and stripped after the stench of dead rats built up in the walls and ceilings. The 60 staff members of the fire station were redistributed among nearby firehouses.

In 2014, New York City Councilman Mark D. Levine said at a public hearing that "We've had rats who are going into cars and eating out electrical cables. We have rats that are entering homes." He described the problem as "epidemic" on some streets in Manhattan.

In October 2020, a 33-year-old man in the Bronx fell through a sidewalk that collapsed under him into a nest of rats, an event colloquially referred to as the "New York City rat chasm". The victim was hospitalized for three weeks. Shortly following the accident, the victim filed a lawsuit for gross negligence against EH & HD 183rd Realty LLC and the city of New York. EH & HD 183rd Realty LLC was charged with gross negligence for not properly maintaining the vault, and the New York City Department of Buildings was charged with gross negligence for not properly inspecting the sidewalk.

=== Viral videos ===
In 2011, a video of a rat climbing on a sleeping man's face on the subway went viral. Rats are so common that ex-Manhattan Borough President Scott Stringer quipped in 2013, "The rats don't scurry. They walk right up to you and say, 'How are you, Mr. Borough President?'" That year, YouTube videos of rats on subway tracks and in a subway car in New York City went viral, as did videos of rats in a Dunkin' Donuts in Manhattan. In June 2014, residents at adjacent Upper West Side buildings started a rent strike, demanding an end to the rat problem. Also in 2014, Allerton Coops in Bronx Park East received three Notices of Violation from the Health Department and was fined for their inadequate response to a severe rat infestation.

In 2015, a YouTube video of a rat carrying a slice of pizza in the subway, dubbed "Pizza Rat", went viral. The video was trending worldwide on Twitter and Facebook within 15 hours of the YouTube upload, garnered 5 million views within two days, and spawned similar staged videos with trained rats such as Selfie Rat.

In early 2016, another video of a rat climbing on a sleeping subway rider was uploaded to social media. The uploader was criticized for his choice to film the incident and post it online rather than intervene.

=== Hurricane Ida depopulation event ===
In late 2021, Tropical Storm Ida caused severe flooding in the New York City sewer system, which was then followed by multiple reports of dozens of rat corpses washing up on the banks of bodies of water in New York. There was no official count of the number of rats living in the sewers of New York, but experts hypothesize that the flooding from Ida may have caused one of the biggest rat depopulation events in New York in decades.

== See also ==
- Environmental issues in New York City
- Pigeons in New York City
- Rat-baiting
- Rat guard
