= Manchester Terrier =

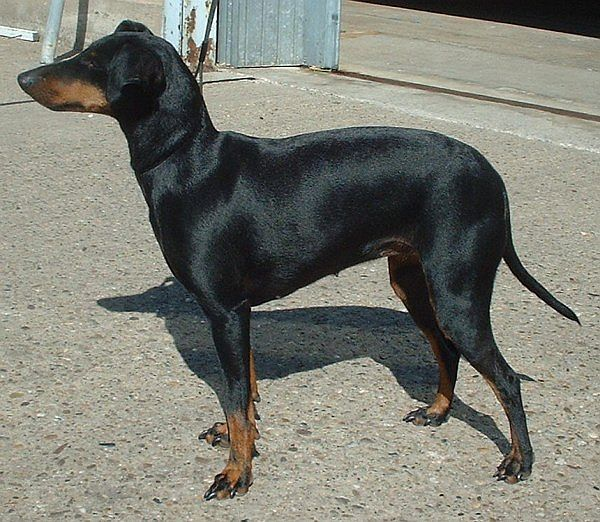
- Manchester Terrier in show pose
- Origin: England
Kennel club standards
- The Kennel Club: standard
- Fédération Cynologique Internationale: standard

The Manchester Terrier is a breed of dog of the smooth-haired terrier type. It was first bred in the 19th century to control vermin, notably rats, at which it excelled. So efficient at the task was it that it often appeared in rat-baiting pits until that sport, which had effectively been illegal in the UK since 1835, finally died out at the beginning of the 20th century.

The breed is generally healthy, although dogs can be affected by several inheritable genetic disorders. A crash in the number of registered Manchester Terriers following the Second World War has resulted in the Kennel Club categorising it as a vulnerable native breed, in danger of extinction.

== History ==
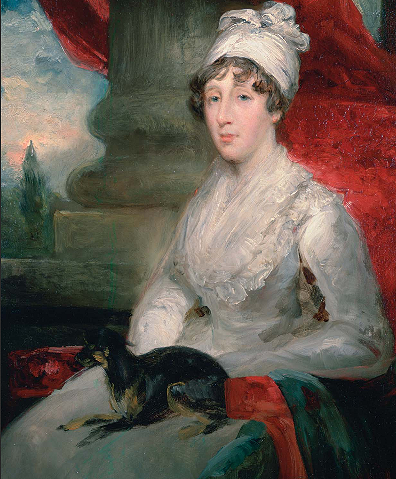
Eliza Soane, wife of the architect John Soane, with her Manchester Terrier Fanny. Painted by John Jackson some time between 1804 and 1815.

The Manchester Terrier was developed from the Black and Tan Terrier and the Whippet.. Writing in the early 16th century, John Caius describes a Manchester-terrier type of dog in De Canibus Britannicis, (Note: De Canibus Brittanicis is believed to be the earliest written work documenting dogs.) and at the beginning of the 19th century Sydenham Edwards described what he called a Manchester Terrier in his Cynographia Britannica.

The Black and Tan Terrier had an almost legendary status as a rat killer, an ability that was much prized in overcrowded and rat-infested cities such as 19th-century Manchester. The sport of rat baiting, in which a terrier was thrown into an enclosure filled with rats, and timed to see how long it took the dog to kill them all, had become popular by the early 19th century along with rabbit coursing. In an effort to produce a dog that could excel at both sports, the breeder John Hulme decided to cross a Black and Tan Terrier with a Whippet. Similar dogs were bred in various other parts of England, but by 1860 Manchester had become the breed centre for these new terriers, and so they became known as Manchester Terriers. Other breeds, including the Italian Greyhound and the Dachshund, may also have been introduced into the bloodline.

The Manchester Terrier gained the nickname of the Gentleman's Terrier in Victorian times, because of its dignified demeanour.

== Characteristics ==
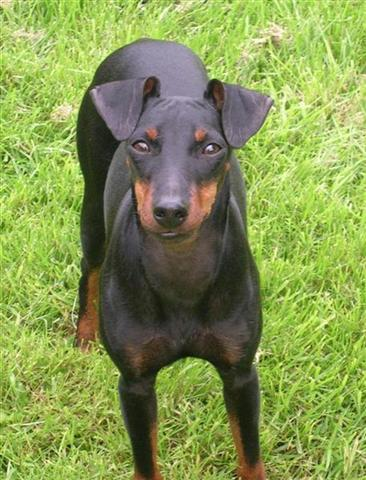
Manchester Terrier with button ears

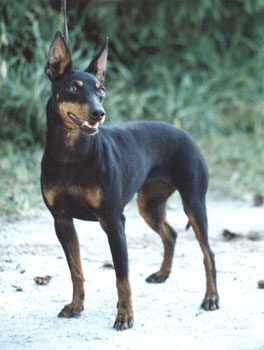
Displaying erect ears

=== Appearance ===
By the early 19th century a closer facsimile to the current Manchester terrier had evolved. In The Dog in Health and Disease by J. A. Walsh, a full chapter was devoted to the black and tan, for the first time recognising it as an established breed. The description given by Walsh is still relevant: Smooth haired, long tapering nose, narrow flat skull, eyes small and bright, chest rather deep than wide, only true colour black and tan.

=== Temperament ===
Some terrier breeds have a reputation for being "stoic and dour", but such terms do not apply to the intelligent and inquisitive Manchester Terrier, who is as "feisty and affectionate" as he is "courageous and tough", and makes a "loyal, eager-to-please" companion.

== Varieties ==
The Canadian and American Kennel Clubs recognise two varieties of Manchester Terrier, the original and a miniaturised variant, the Toy Manchester Terrier. The latter was recognised as a separate breed by the American Kennel Club in 1938, and is still considered to be a separate breed by the British Kennel Club, the English Toy Terrier (Black & Tan). Where the Manchester Terrier may have button ears, erect ears, or cropped ears, the Toy Manchester Terrier only has erect ears. Other than the size difference and ear type, the Manchester Terrier and the Toy Manchester Terrier have the same overall appearance. Since 1958 the American Kennel Club has considered both to be varieties of the same breed.

== Health ==
According to the Kennel Club's Purebred Health Survey, carried out in 2004, the Manchester Terrier has a median lifespan of around 12 years 10 months. Slightly more than 31 per cent of the animals whose deaths were reported in the survey died of old age. There are some recognised health problems in the breed associated with inheritable genetic mutations.

=== Secondary glaucoma ===
Glaucoma is a fairly common genetic condition in several breeds of terrier, including the Manchester Terrier. Secondary glaucoma, also known as lens luxation, is caused by excessive pressure within the eyeball forcing the lens of the eye out of alignment. The only effective treatment for this condition is surgical removal of the lens.

=== Von Willebrands disease ===
Von Willebrands disease is a blood-clotting disorder that affects humans and several breeds of dog, including the Manchester Terrier. The genetic mutation occurs in both the standard and toy varieties, but is seen more commonly in the toy. In the Manchester Terrier the gene is autosomal recessive, meaning that for any offspring to be affected the faulty gene must be carried by both parents. Affected dogs are prone to nose bleeds and bleeding from the gums. DNA tests are available to check for the condition, and the Kennel Club maintains a register of the results of those tests, allowing breeders to avoid breeding from affected dogs.

== Extinction concerns ==
At the end of the Second World War in 1945 there were only 11 Manchester Terriers registered with the Kennel Club, but thanks to the efforts of the British Manchester Terrier Club, formed in 1937, and others, the breed was saved from extinction. The Kennel Club has nevertheless classified the Manchester Terrier as a vulnerable native breed. (Note: The Kennel Club considers a breed to be vulnerable to extinction if there are fewer than 300 registrations of birth per year.) Between 2017 and 2021, an average of 177 births per year were registered.

== See also ==
- List of dog breeds
- Tiny the Wonder, famous mid-19th century Manchester Terrier

== Bibliography ==
- Cookson, Roy (2002), A World of Manchesters, Casthermen Books, ISBN 978-0-9542404-0-0
- Shane, Phil (1999), Manchester Terrier, T.F.H.Publications, ISBN 978-0-7938-0755-0
