= Ryders Alley Trencher-fed Society =

Organization in New York City

- Region served: United States
- Official language: English

Ryders Alley Trencher-fed Society (R.A.T.S.) is a New York City group founded in the 1990s that conducts organized rat catching with ratting dogs. The group was named by founding member Richard Reynolds after Ryders Alley in Manhattan, which was once rat infested, and the trencher-fed pack assembled to hunt. The group often hunts in Lower Manhattan locations like Theatre Alley where garbage is accessible to vermin.

The group responds to calls from citizens, including homeless whom they call their "intelligence network". In 2017, New York City councilmember Eric Ulrich called upon the group to eradicate rats in Ozone Park, Queens and awarded them for their efforts. The dogs each received a "Vigilante Award" from the New York City Council, a dog bone, and beef jerky treats.

== See also ==
- Rats in New York City
- Rat-baiting
