= Tiny the Wonder =

English dog

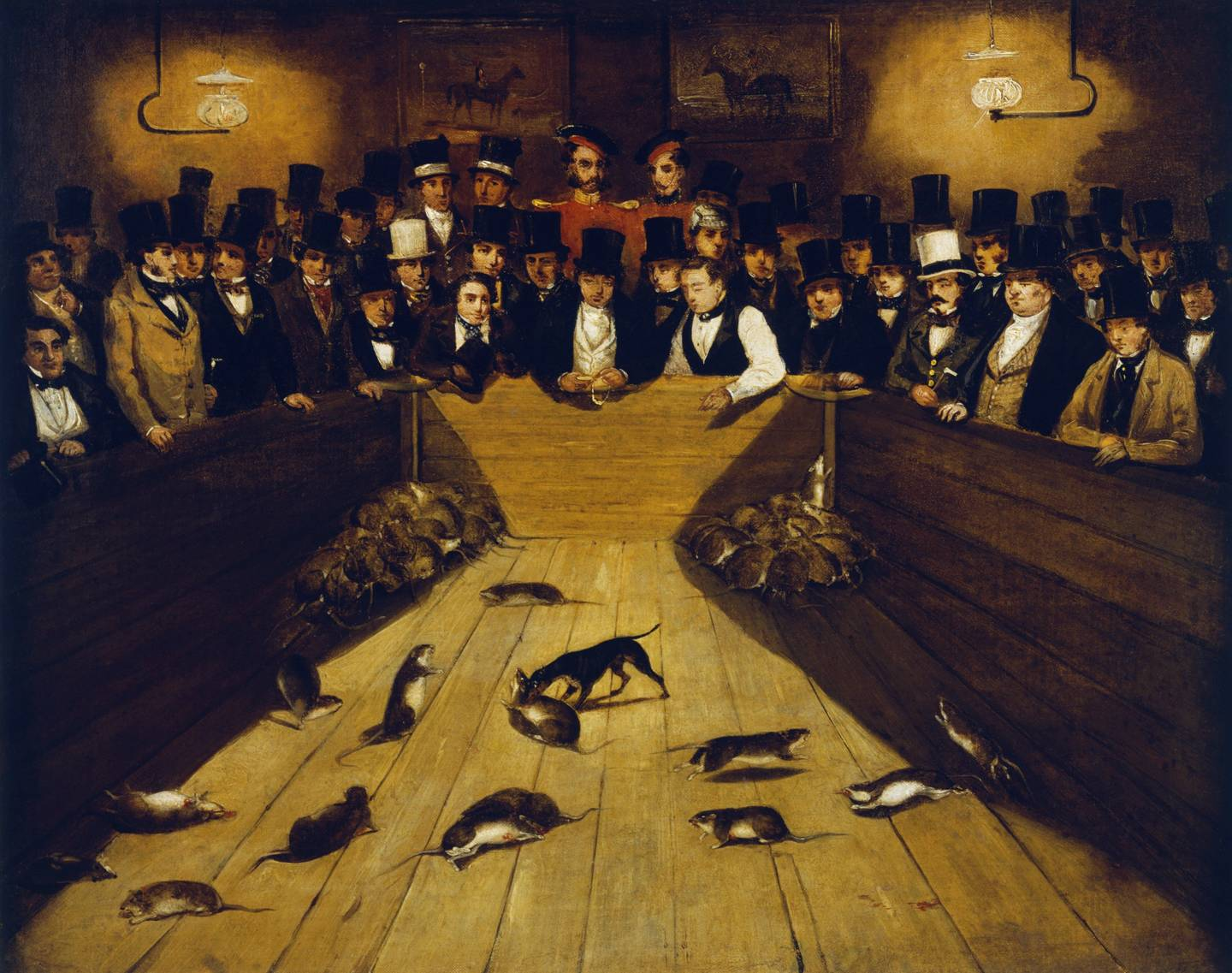
Depiction of Tiny in the painting Rat-Catching at the 'Blue Anchor' Tavern, Bunhill Row, Finsbury, London. Oil on canvas, 1850–52. Museum of London, London.

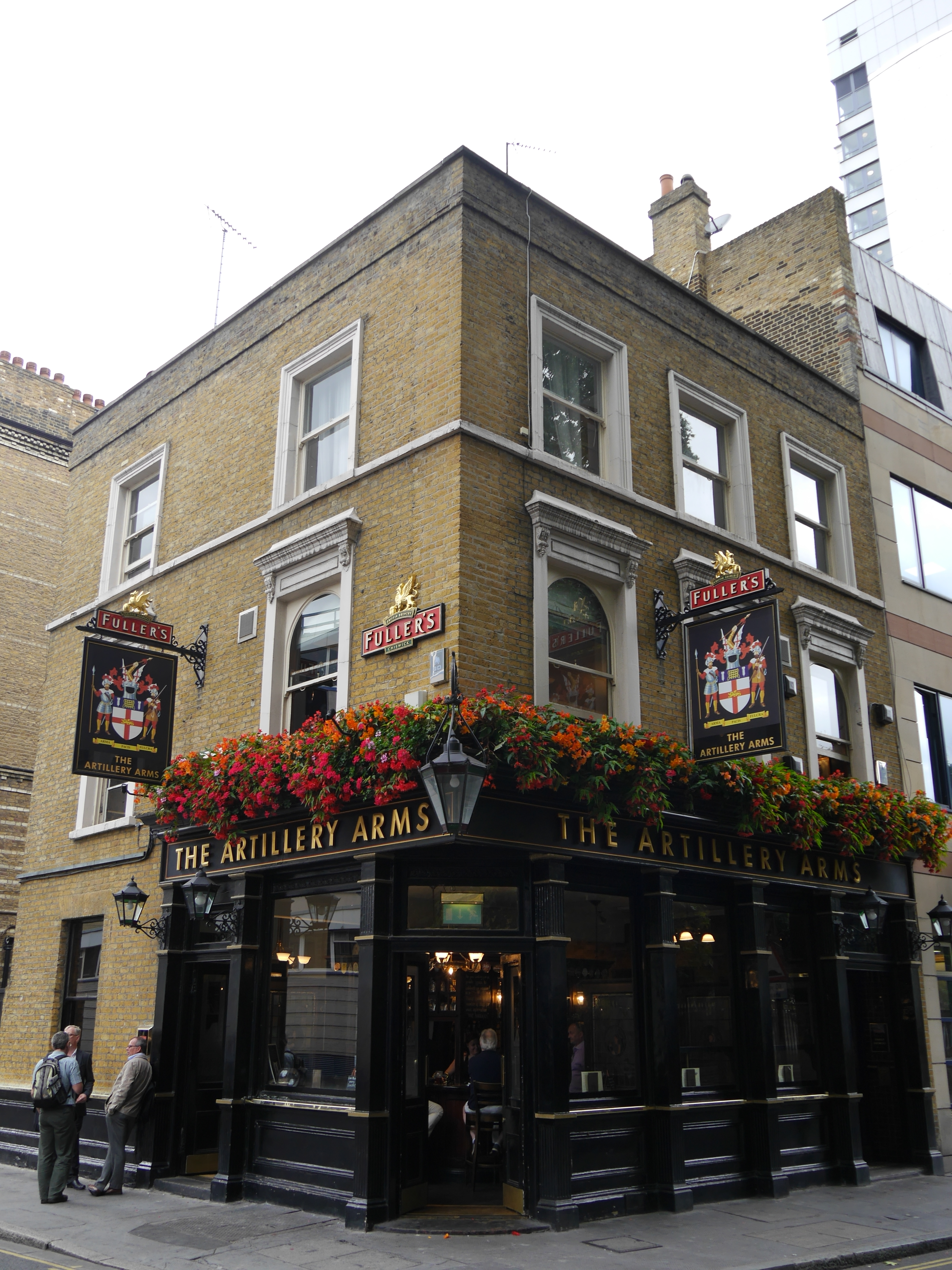
Artillery Arms, 102 Bunhill Row, where Tiny the Wonder fought in the rat pits underneath

Tiny the Wonder was an English Toy Terrier (Black & Tan) famous in the City of London in the mid-19th century for being able to kill 200 rats in an hour in the city's rat-baiting pits. At the time, the world record for killing 100 rats was 5 minutes, 30 seconds, held by a bull and terrier named Billy.

== Career ==
Tiny's pedigree was by Old Dick out of Old Nell, and in 1848 or 1849 he weighed five and a half pounds and was owned by Jemmy Shaw, the innkeeper of the Blue Anchor Tavern (now the Artillery Arms) in Bunhill Row in the City of London. Shaw brought in rats from Essex for the rat pits under the pub, as they were healthier than London sewer rats, and kept as many as 2,000 rats there. Tiny was so small that he wore a woman's bracelet instead of a collar. He once held the rat killing record, with 300 dead in just under 55 minutes.

Tiny appears in a c. 1850–1852 oil painting, Rat-Catching at the Blue Anchor Tavern, Bunhill Row, Finsbury, where he is depicted trying to kill 200 rats in an hour. Tiny succeeded twice, on 28 March 1848 and 27 March 1849, "having on both occasions time to spare".

== Contests ==
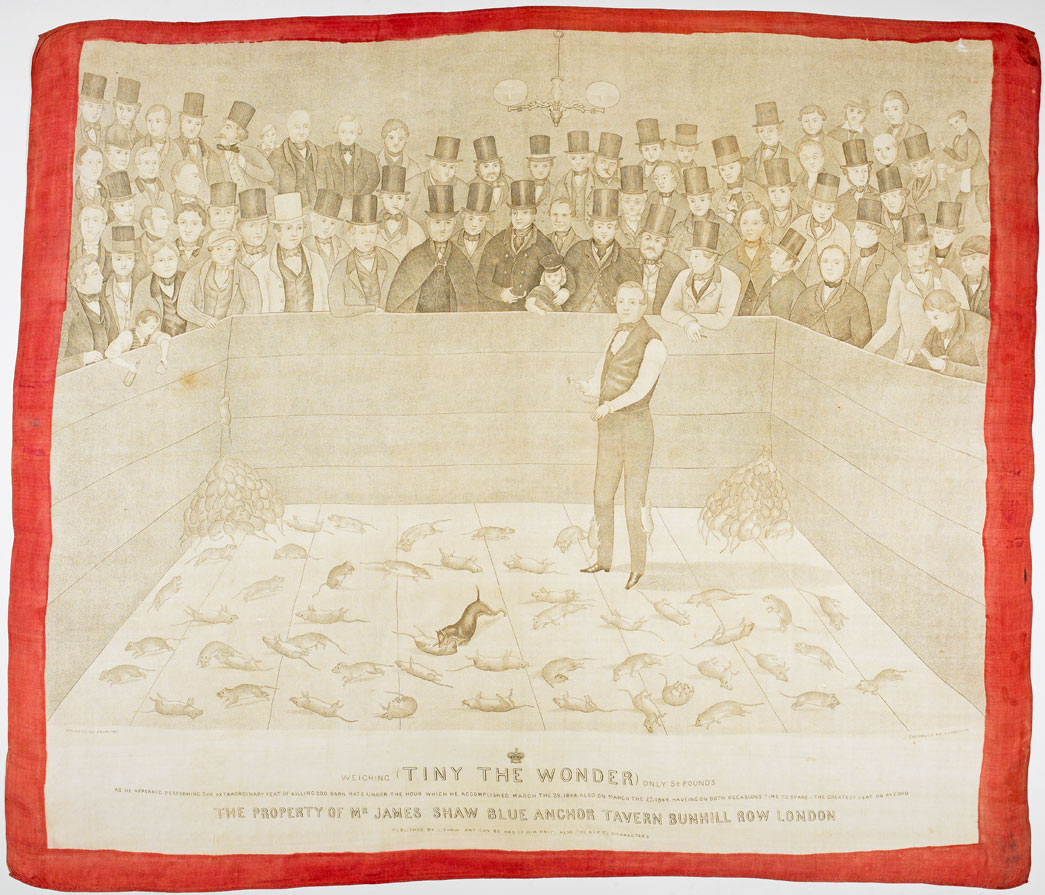
Tiny the Wonder handkerchief, circa 1850

During the 1840s rat-baiting reached its climax in popularity in London. Jemmy Shaw invented the no-touch rule, meaning neither the rat nor the dog could be removed from the pit before completion of the match.

== Breed ==
Tiny has been described as being an example of a dog close to today's English Toy Terrier. The breed was developed to produce a more evenly matched contest between the dog and the rats. The breed's narrow head and lack of pronounced zygomatic arches allowed it to kill a rat with one bite and not waste any time chewing. The dog's spotting pattern, especially the tan spots on its face brighter than its black eyes, could confuse the rats and also protect the dog's eyes from being bitten.

== Legacy ==
Tiny's life is one of those being celebrated from 5 April 2019 in an exhibition titled, "Beasts of London" at the Museum of London.
