= Rat czar =

Rat mitigation title

A director of rodent mitigation, rat czar, or rat tzar, is a position appointed by local government. An employee with this title is given the sole task of decreasing the municipality's rat population. This person will coordinate with different agencies within the local government, private sector, and community organizations. This separates rats from a local government's pest control efforts, which is typically overseen by the Department of Public Works, inspection services, and the water and sewer commission. This is an effort to specifically target the vermin and centralize the issue.

== History ==
On April 12, 2023, New York City appointed Kathleen Corradi to the position of rat czar to fight rats in New York City. The job posting reported the employee will "reduce the rat population, increase cleanliness, and prevent pestilence." Corradi previously worked in the city's education department. Under this new role, she was tasked with solely working on rat reduction to improve the health and quality of life for people living in New York City. She would be collaborating with different agencies to use their resources and target rats.

Along with creating the position of a rat czar, Mayor Eric Adams announced a $3.5 million investment to first target the rat population in Harlem. This investment would be spread over multiple agencies to test different reduction techniques, and would be overseen by Corradi.

Each state and city has their own way of handling pest control. However, once New York City made the move to publicize its hiring of a rat czar, other municipalities around the world took notice. After Boston was named one of the rattiest cities in the United States, local officials have brought forth plans for the city to create a rat czar position. London has also made efforts to create a rat czar position. Smaller towns like Somerville, Massachusetts have introduced the rat czar position. Cities like Chicago and Newark, New Jersey have their own Rodent Control Bureaus. Due to the widespread media coverage of the New York City rat czar position, the heads of these bureaus have been referred to by the same name.

In May 2024, Mayor Eric Adams announced the first ever "National Urban Rat Summit" that would bring in rodent mitigation experts and researches to gather and discuss the best ways to fight rats within cities. Officials from across the country congregated in September.

== Responsibilities ==
=== Identification of areas of interest ===
In order to quell a rat population, the rat czar must identify where there are 'hot spots', or areas of interest to specifically target. The rat czar will tour areas and evaluate next steps. Community-member reports can also help identify potential rat nests. New York City announced its own 'Rat Pack' which locals could join by taking a New York Department of Health session and then join the rat czar on a 'rat walk' to identify areas in need.

=== Cleaning ===
After an area of interest has been identified, the rat czar and other employees will target the impact of the local rat population. This includes washing away rat droppings, picking up garbage that rats may eat, and trimming back shrubs and bushes so the rats have less areas to hide.

=== Prevention ===
Once the area has been wiped of a rat's presence, the rat czar and others will take preventative measures to ensure the area is no longer visited by rats. This includes sealing cracks in infrastructure, targeting rats burrows and nests, and trapping rats to rid them of the area.

Under the New York City rat czar, the Department of Sanitation enforced a new rule to target rat reduction. Residents, businesses, and building managers were instructed to put trash on the sidewalk no earlier than 6 p.m. All curbside trash bags were instructed to be rid of by 8 p.m.

=== Impact quantification ===
After all steps have been taken to ensure the rats have been cleared, the rat czar is in charge of tracking the community response. The rat czar will listen to community sighting reports and see if these actions have made an impact. This also means educating the public so the community knows how to handle and prevent rats.

=== Abatement ===
The rat czar is tasked with creating new ways for the rat population to be quelled. Colin Zeigler of Somerville has introduced dry ice, carbon dioxide poisoning, and SMART boxes that trap and electrocute rats.
