= Jemmy Shaw =

19th century British dog breeder

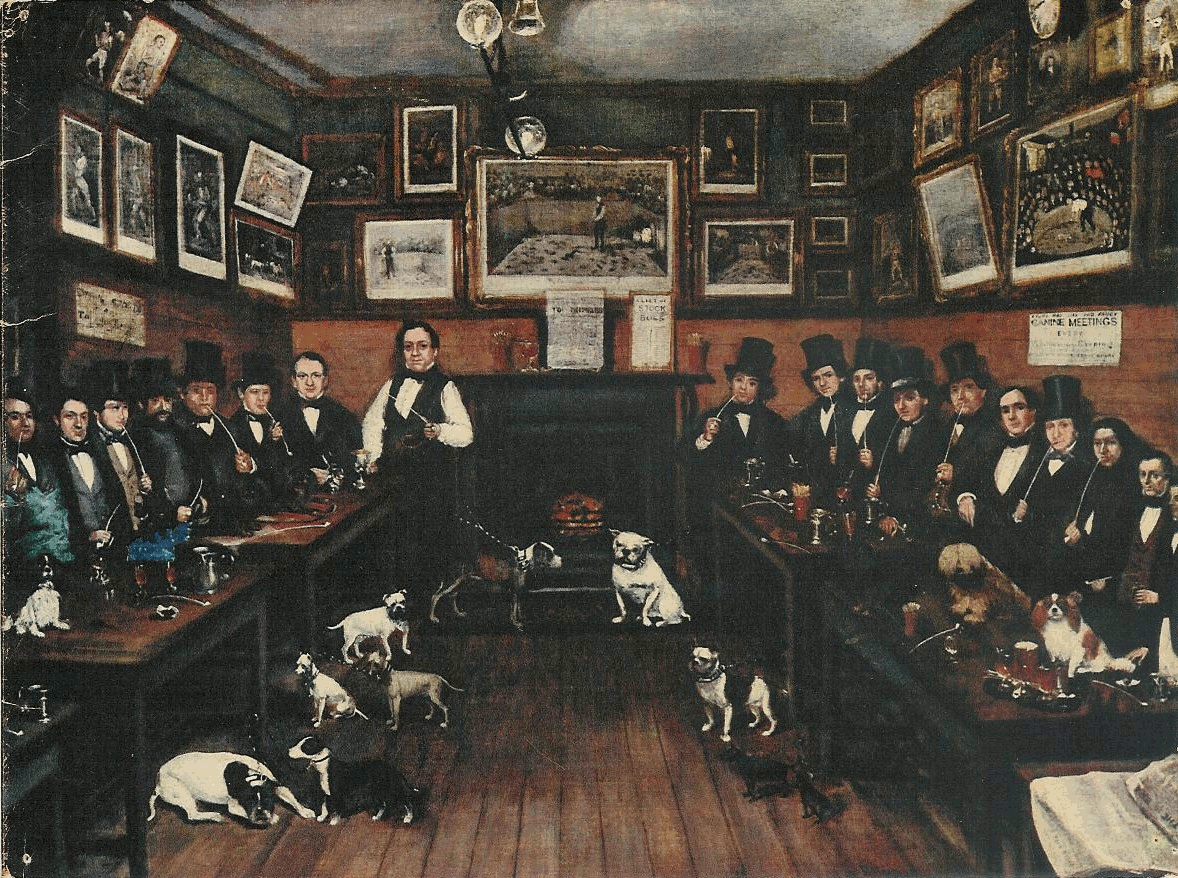
Toy Dog Club, circa 1855, by R. Marshall, Jemmy Shaw is standing beside the fireplace with the white long sleeve shirt in the Queens Head at Piccadilly and Haymarket, London.

James "Jemmy" Elton Shaw (1815–1885) was a 19th-century pioneer and fancier of the early dog show days, a promoter of dog fighting and rat-baiting contests, a breeder of Old English Bulldogs, Bull Terriers and Toy Terriers and a contributor in the development of fancy rats.

== History ==
James "Jemmy" Shaw was born in December 1814 in Spitalfields, London, with little known about his childhood. In 1831, Shaw had gained recognition after a bare-knuckle boxing match against an opponent known as Young Welsh, a brutal fight that reportedly lasted nearly two hours. During this time period of the pugilistic scene, the sport had already acquired an unsavoury reputation, suggesting his early career was rooted in the rougher, less-respectable elements of London's sporting world.

The art or practice of breeding animals to develop points of conventional beauty or excellence, known as the "Fancy" was a unique sporting subculture that Shaw participated in emerging during 19th century London, with a fraternity of sportsmen centred on a range of dog related sports. Its origins trace back to the world of bare-knuckle boxing, or pugilism, before expanding to encompass dog fighting, ratting and eventually dog shows emphasizing canine beauty. These activities were primarily held in public houses and catered to a largely working class audience.

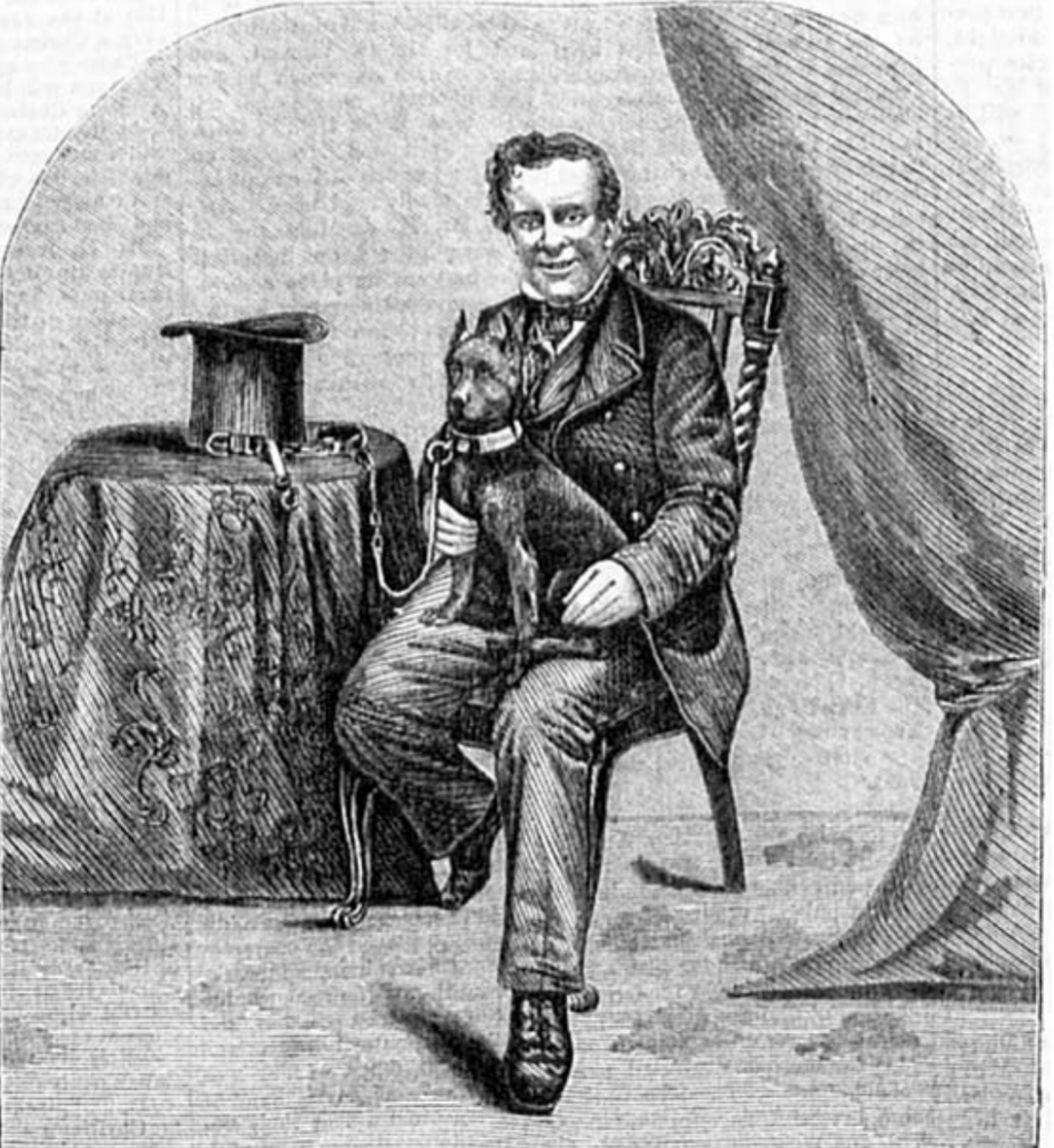
Jemmy Shaw and champion dog Jacko, c.1865

Within this milieu, Shaw was a preeminent figure, acting as a leading participator and influencer ensuring his taverns were top venues for these spectacles for decades during mid-1800s. Shaw's life story offers a unique window into the cultural shifts of Victorian England, a time when public attitudes toward animal cruelty and animal welfare were in flux, creating a strange landscape between the traditions of brutal animal entertainment transistioning to the burgeoning culture of keeping animals as pets.

Shaw experienced a multifaceted life, from his rise as a bare-knuckle boxer to an entrepreneur, whose influence bridged the worlds from animal cruelty to animal companionship. Shaw's legacy reflected a microcosm of the complex and contradictory evolution of human-animal relationships during the Victorian era. The duality of Shaw reflects a man who profited from animal cruelty but also, perhaps inadvertently, played a direct role in fostering a new compassionate relationship with animals through his breeding of both dogs and fancy rats for companionship. This paradoxical influence makes Shaw's story, so compelling and worthy of study, as it captures the simultaneous existence of human barbarism toward animals and the care and love between human and animal that defined this time period of great social change.

== Dogs ==
According to the Sporting Chronicle Annual, Jem owned a black-and-tan bull and terrier named "Jacko", the world record holder for rat killing.

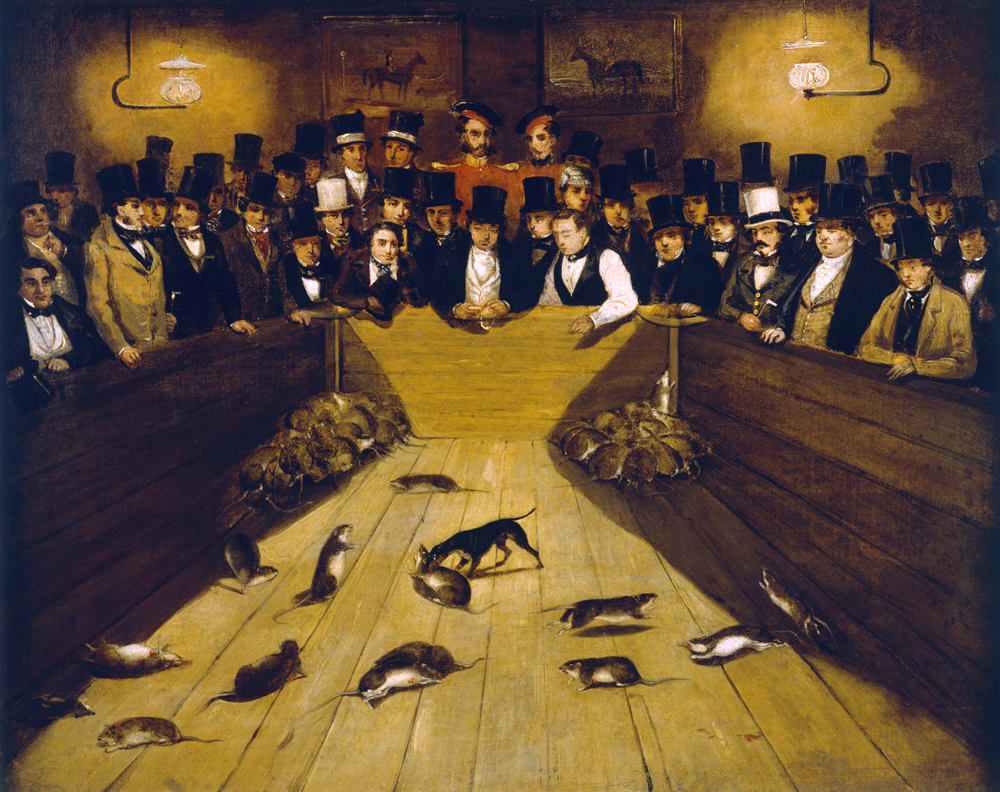
Tiny the Wonder, Rat-Catching at the Blue Anchor Tavern, London, c.1850–52. The man in the middle with a pocket watch is Jemmy Shaw.

Shaw owned Tiny the Wonder, an English Toy Terrier (Black & Tan), famous in the City of London in the mid-19th century for being able to kill 200 rats in an hour in London's rat-baiting pits.

== Shaw's taverns ==
By 1846, Shaw was the landlord of the Blue Anchor Tavern, now the Artillery Arms, located at 102 Bunhill Row, St. Luke's, London Borough of Islington. Shaw would hold rat-baiting contests in the tavern basement for spectators. Shaw was able to maintain as many as 2,000 rats in his establishment for upcoming contests. In May 1852, Shaw transferred the license of Blue Anchor Tavern to the next owner.

The book The Man of Pleasure's Illustrated Pocket-Book for 1850 published in London is a "gentleman’s night guide" to London's entertainment and red-light districts, complete with illustrations and a slang ("flash") dictionary. The book notes Jemmy Shaw and the activities at the Blue Anchor Tavern, as follows:

"Shaw’s—-Blue Anchor, Bunhill Row, St. Lukes. This house is notorious as the first “fancy house" in London for dogs, sparring, and rat-killing. Matches are held here weekly, generally on Wednesday evenings; the landlord, too, is a right’un, and we beg to assure the visitor that he will find a night here not ill spent, at least, if lie has spirit enough to be interested in a display of good old English "pluck" both in men and dogs. Admission to the killing matches, 1s."

— The Man of Pleasure's Illustrated Pocket-Book for 1850

In 1853, Shaw acquired the Queen's Head tavern, Queen's Head Court, on Great Windmill Street at Haymarket, London. At Queens Head, Shaw allowed pub shows that were semi-private gatherings of local dog fanciers, rat-baiting competitions and secretive dog fights.

== Establishment of fancy rats ==
Between the 1840s and 1860s Jemmy Shaw and Jack Black bred and sold many different colours of fancy rats and their work aided in the establishment of them as pets.
