= Bunhill Row =

Street in St Luke's, London Borough of Islington

Coordinates: 51°31′25.96″N 0°5′24.67″W

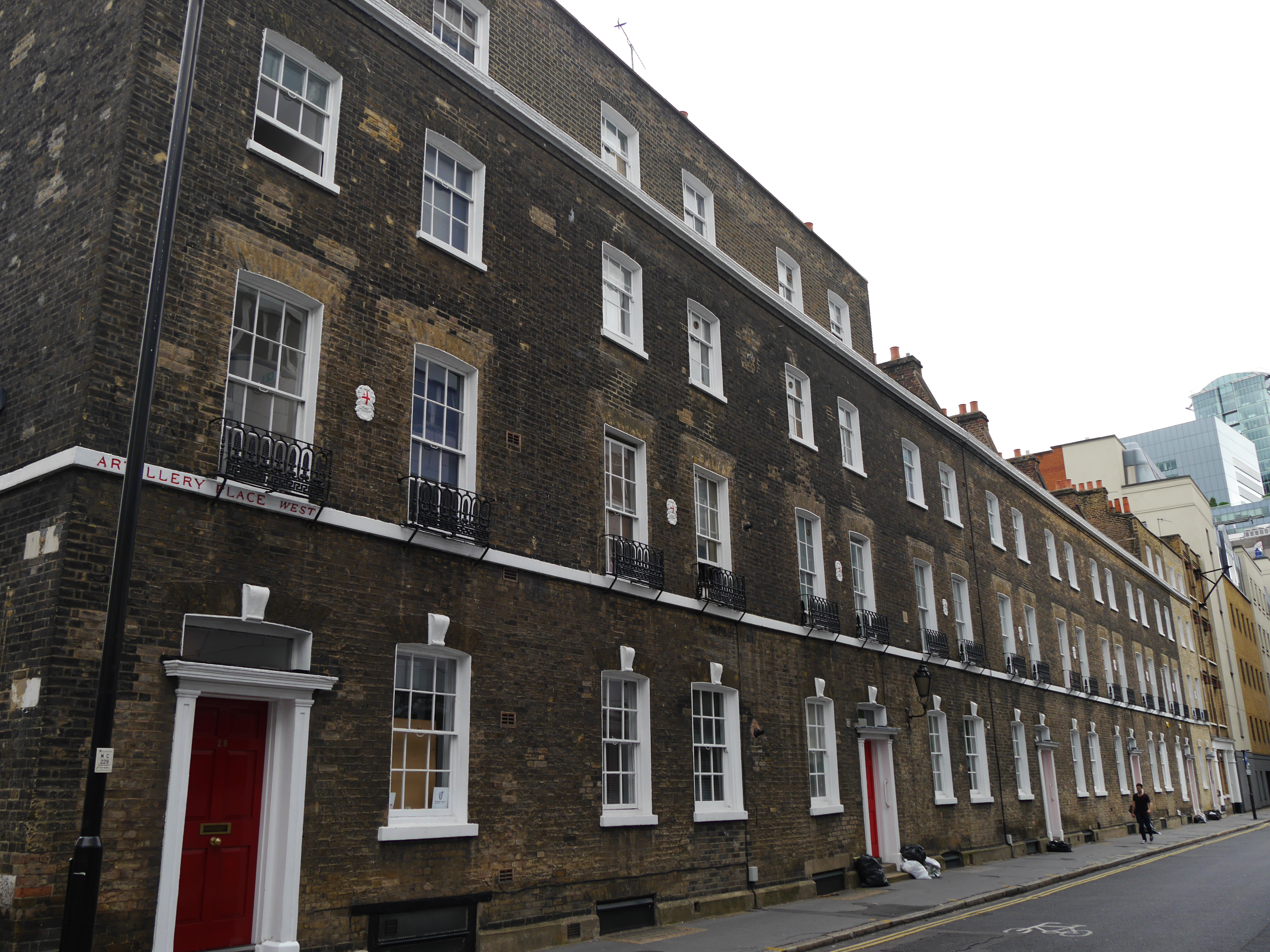
20–29 Bunhill Row

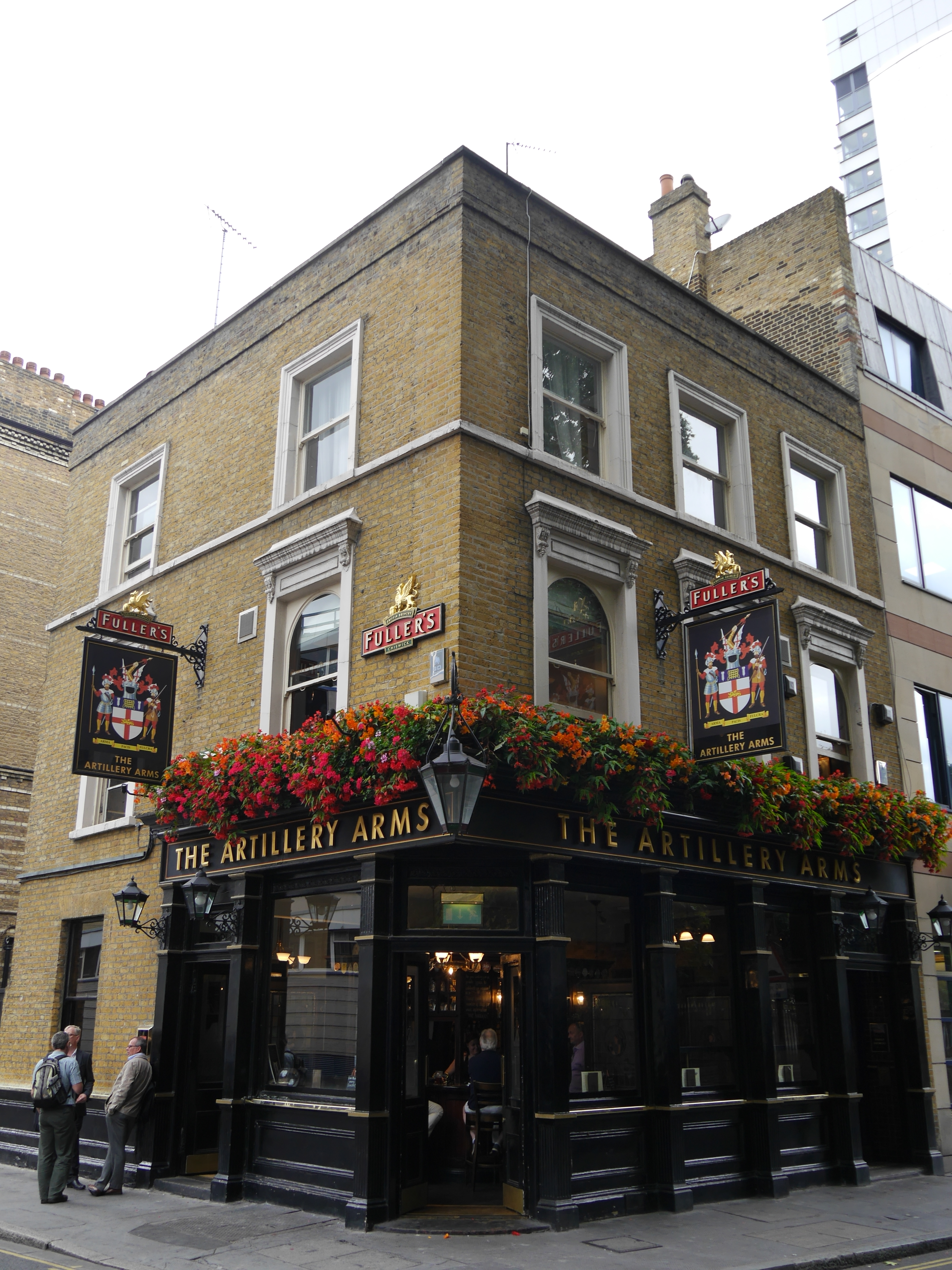
Artillery Arms, 102 Bunhill Row

Bunhill Row is a street located in St Luke's, London Borough of Islington, London. The street runs north–south from Old Street to Chiswell Street. On the east side are the cemetery of Bunhill Fields and the open space of the Honourable Artillery Company's Artillery Ground.

== Buildings ==
- 1 Bunhill Row, is the head office of the law firm Slaughter and May.
- 2 Bunhill Row, is the Moorgate campus of The University of Law. Previous occupiers include the Board of Trade in the 1950s and 1960s, the Post Office, and the Securities and Investments Board/Financial Services Authority (as it then was) in the 1990s and 2000s. It was formerly known as Gavrelle House.
- 20 and 21–29 Bunhill Row, built in 1830–31 for the Honourable Artillery Company, are listed buildings.
- 102 Bunhill Row, is the Artillery Arms. During the mid-1800s it was called the Blue Anchor Tavern owned by Jemmy Shaw.
- 106 Bunhill Row, is the City University's Bayes Business School.
- St Joseph's Catholic Church is on Bunhill Row.
