= Serafina and the Splintered Heart =

American novel written by Robert Beatty

- Author: Robert Beatty
- Cover artist: Maria Elias
- Series: Serafina Series (book 3)
- Genre: Fantasy, Historical Fiction, Middle-Grade novel
- Set in: Asheville, N.C
- Published: July 12th, 2016
- Publisher: Disney Hyperion
- Publication place: United States
- Media type: Print (hardcover and paperback), audiobook, e-book
- Pages: 355
- ISBN: 9781484775042
- OCLC: 1003307330
- LC Class: PZ7.1.B4347 Sg 2017
- Preceded by: Serafina and the Twisted Staff
- Followed by: Serafina and the Seven Stars
- Website: robertbeattybooks.com

Serafina and the Splintered Heart is an American historical fiction, fantasy novel written by Robert Beatty and published in 2017. It is the third novel in the Serafina Series and follows Serafina and the Twisted Staff. Serafina, Chief Rat Catcher and protector of the Biltmore Estate, encounters a strange and unnatural force which threatens Biltmore with wicked storms and violent floods. While fiercely fighting a battle that seems impossible, Serafina also faces questions about the value of true friendship and the power of forgiveness.

Serafina and the Splintered Heart was published on July 4, 2017 by Disney Hyperion. The release of the third book put the Serafina Series on the New York Times Best Selling Children's Series list. Serafina and the Splintered Heart is preceded by Serafina and the Black Cloak and Serafina and the Twisted Staff. A fourth book in the series, titled Serafina and the Seven Stars was published in Summer 2019.
