= Trench rats =

Rodents found in frontline trenches

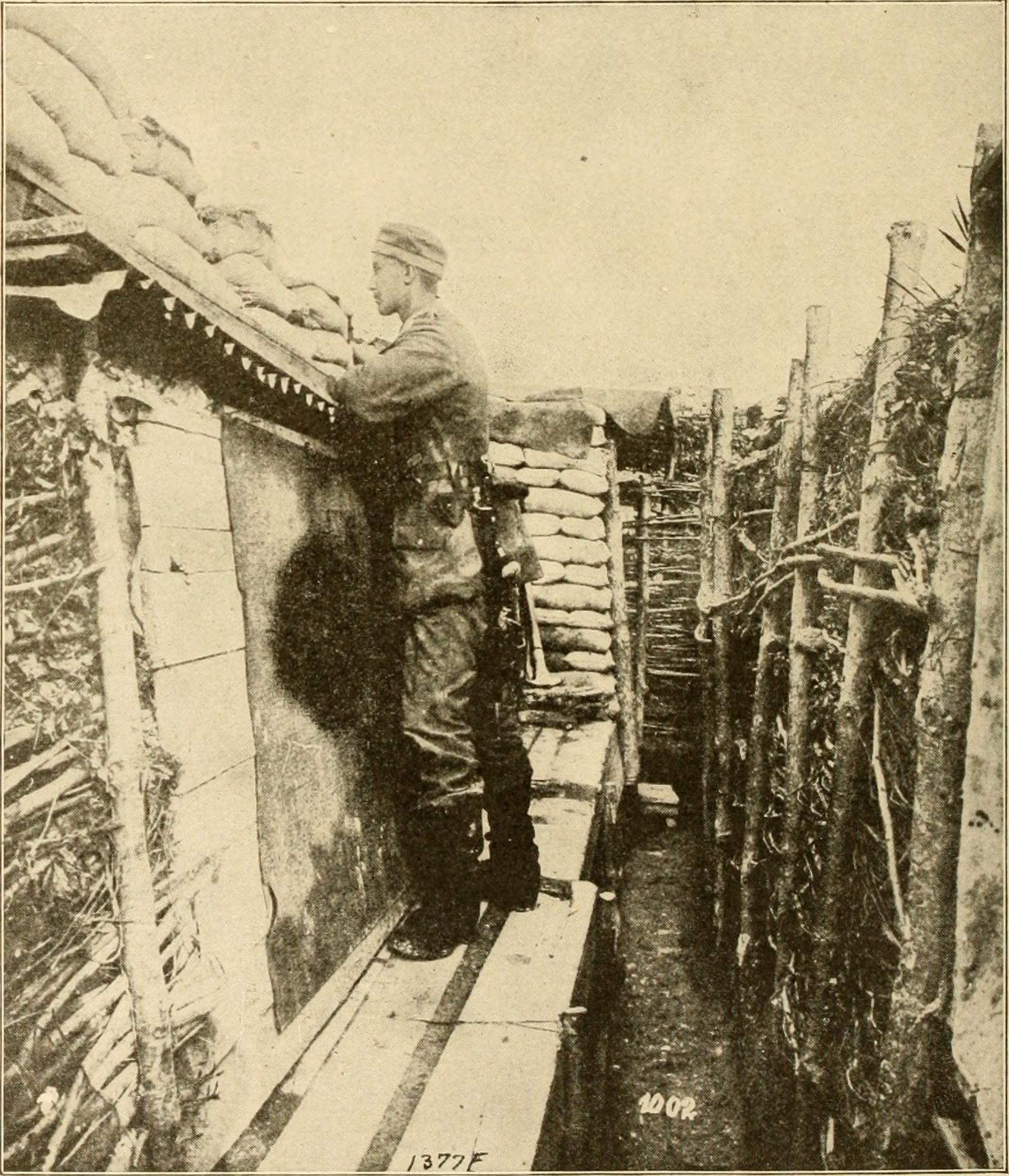
Photograph of a German trench

Trench rats were rodents that were found around the frontline trenches of World War I. Due to massive amounts of debris, corpses, and a putrid environment, rats at the trenches bred at a rapid pace. The rats likely numbered in the millions. The rats played a role in damaging the soldiers' health, psyche and morale and were responsible for lack of sleep, adding to the filthy conditions and unsanitary hygiene in the trenches. As such, the trench rats left a lasting impression on the Allied soldiers who served on the Western Front, with veterans who served in the French and British armies speaking about their horrible experiences with rats during interviews. Attempts to solve the rat problem were not effective during the war. Although they could be found in abundance during World War I, these rats appeared to decrease rapidly after the war ended.

The rats' contribution to the terrible environment in the trenches aided in the avoidance of using trenches in future wars, especially in Europe, where their negative legacy remains to this day, memorialized through media portrayals. Trench rats are often viewed with a pessimistic connotation associated with the worst of trench life and warfare, especially in their depiction in movies. They have also been portrayed in a positive light in poems, such as "Break of Day in the Trenches" by Isaac Rosenberg, as well as in modern fictional history videos as a metaphor for the life of a French soldier living in the trenches.

== World War I ==
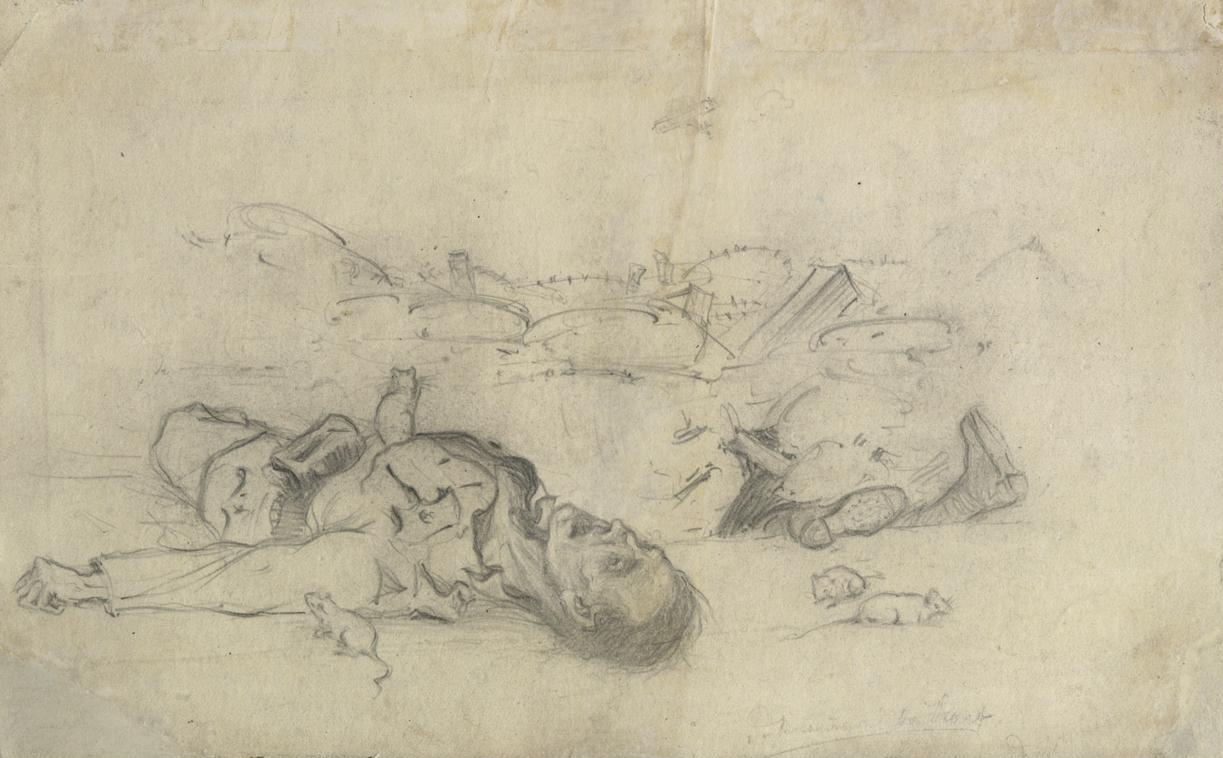
A sketch by Harry Bateman showing corpses and rats

One of the most widespread problems that many soldiers of the Allied and Central powers in Europe faced during World War I was the abundance of rats they were forced to live alongside during the war. High numbers of soldiers, both alive and dead, stationed along the trenches dug into the Western Front, in constrained, outdoor spaces with a severe lack of available cleanliness procedures led to trench rats becoming a common occurrence.

=== In the trenches ===
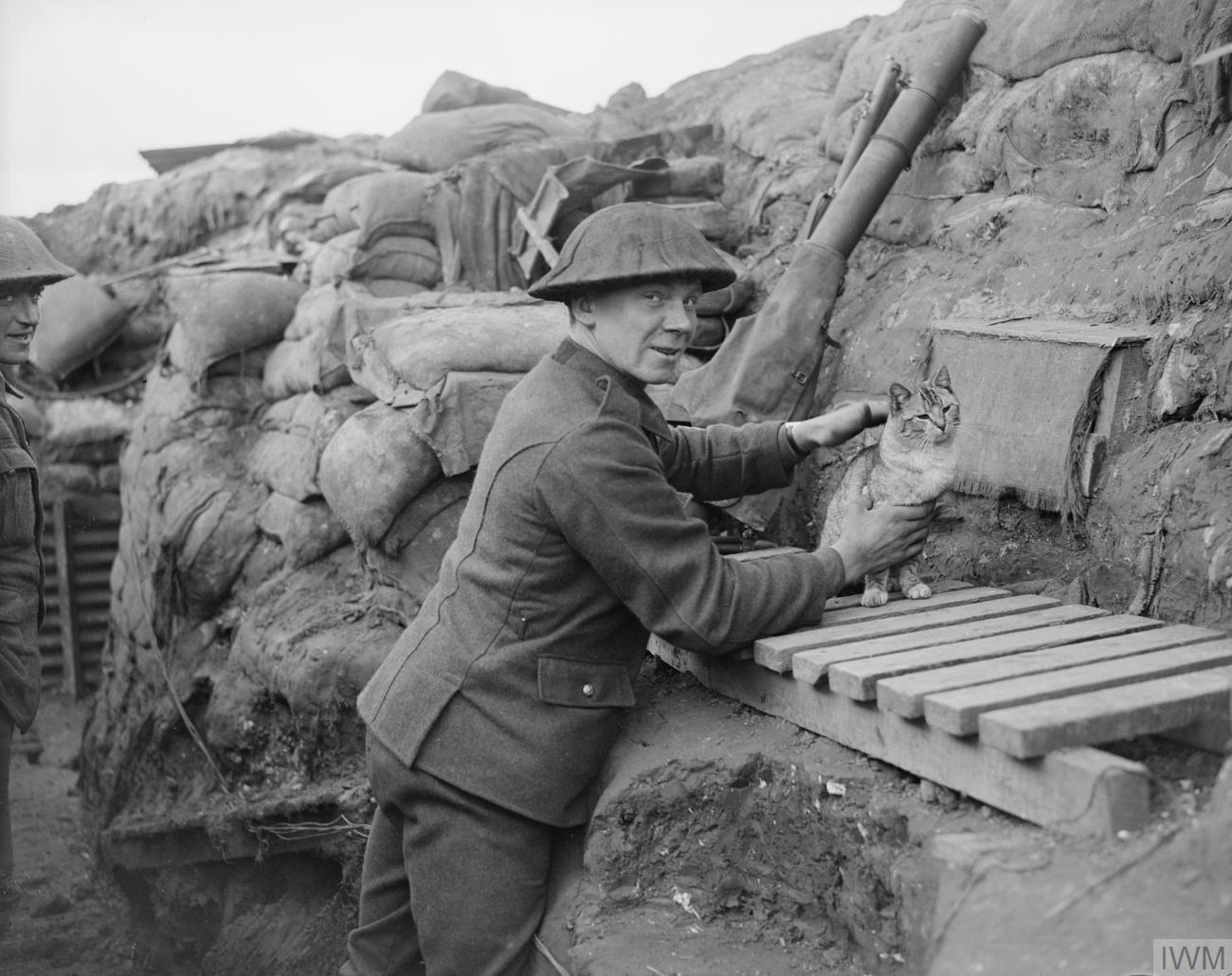
A soldier in a trench with the regiment's cat mascot, February 1918. In addition to providing company, cats and dogs also helped kill rats.

When living in the trenches along the Western Front, food and waste created by soldiers drew the rats in. The environment in the trenches was optimal for a rat's breeding ground: with an abundance of corpses, food, shelter, water and waste, the rats were able to breed quickly. Rats could be found wherever soldiers were; where they ate, where they slept, where they fought. There are estimations that show it is possible there were more rats than soldiers in trenches. Rats, being nocturnal creatures, would often be active during times when soldiers were trying to rest. Only those with high enough status would be given "anti-rat beds" while the rest of the soldiers would have practically no form of protection against them. It was not uncommon for rats to crawl across the faces of sleeping soldiers or even eat food straight from soldiers' hands as they became more accustomed to human presence. Attempts to separate food from the rats would prove to be futile, as rats were bold and snatched the food from the pockets of sleeping soldiers anyway. In addition to eating the food rations of soldiers, rats also had a proclivity to eat the candles of soldiers, taking away a source of light in an already dangerous environment.

== Impact on soldiers ==
=== Physical effects on soldiers ===
Rats are known for carrying various contagious diseases. The close proximity between the soldiers and the rats led to these diseases being spread throughout the trenches. The most common of these would be typhus, bartonellosis (also known as trench fever), and leptospirosis. These diseases could take a massive toll on the soldiers, with trench fever possibly pulling a soldier away from the front lines for months at a time. Rats were carriers of lice. Lice can also transmit disease and played a role in spreading trench fever amongst the soldiers.

Trench rats also gnawed on those who were wounded, sleeping or unable to protect themselves. In one instance, a British soldier recounted in an interview that one of his fellow countrymen had his forehead bitten while he had been asleep, with the wound being severe enough to warrant a visit to the infirmary.

=== Psychological effects on soldiers ===
Trench rats contributed to many different psychological effects on the human psyche given their ability to disrupt sleep and reduce the overall quality of the soldiers' rest. The noises rats made in no man's land during night would sometimes cause soldiers to believe enemies were mounting an attack, leading them to grow paranoid and shoot out into the empty space between trenches. Rats also scurried across the soldiers' faces and bodies when they slept, which was another cause for awakening. On top of all of this, rats were known to eat the irretrievable dead bodies of soldiers left in no man's land, and the nibbling of rats eating bodies could be heard in the trenches during periods of silence between active warfare.

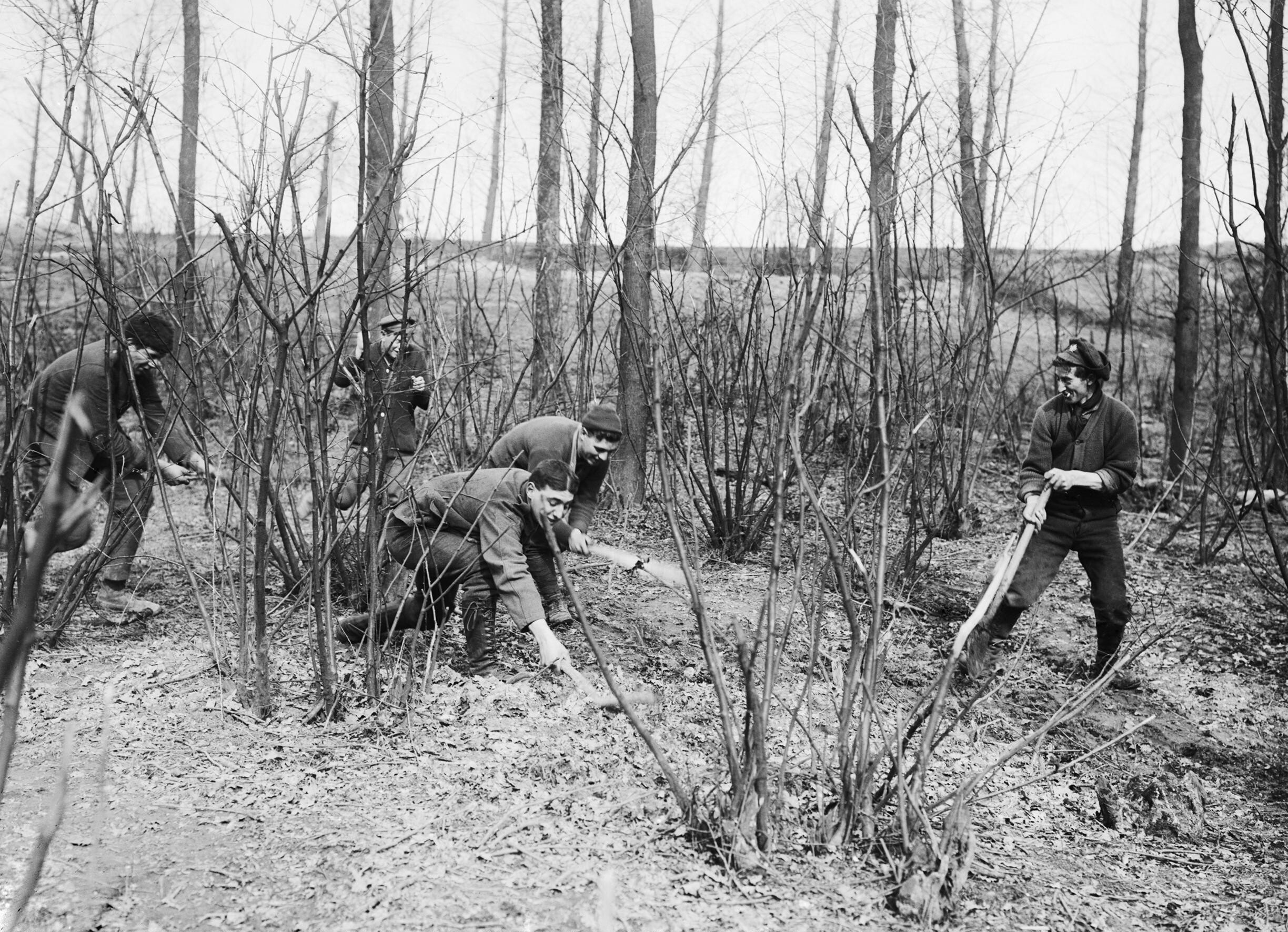
Canadian troops on a rat hunt in Ploegsteert Wood, near Ypres, in March 1916

On the other hand, the situation with the rats also allowed some reprieve to the soldiers stationed along the Western Front. Due to long periods of inactivity in the trenches with an abundance of rats, rat hunting became a sport and a source of entertainment for the Allied soldiers to stave off boredom. Because ammunition needed to be conserved for battles, killing the rats with bayonets was acceptable and eventually became a pastime for the soldiers. Rats also served as companions, with some soldiers keeping them as pets to escape the brutality of the war around them.

Overall, the negative experiences with the trench rats that the Allied soldiers experienced on the Western Front far outweighed those of the positive and many British and French veterans who served there would later recall rats as an integral part of their worst experiences in the trenches, amongst the mud, rain, lice, trench foot and death.

== Attempted solutions ==
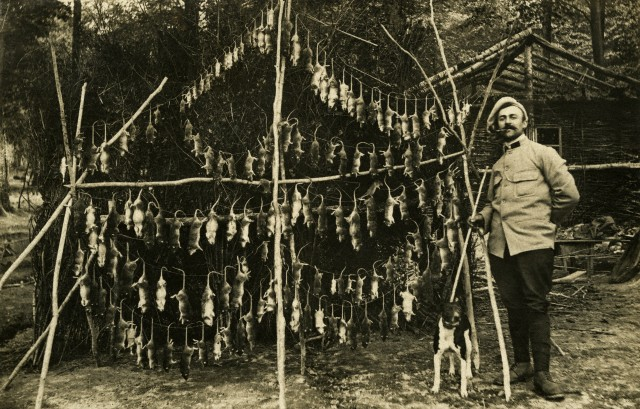
Rat-hunter and dog showing off hunted rats

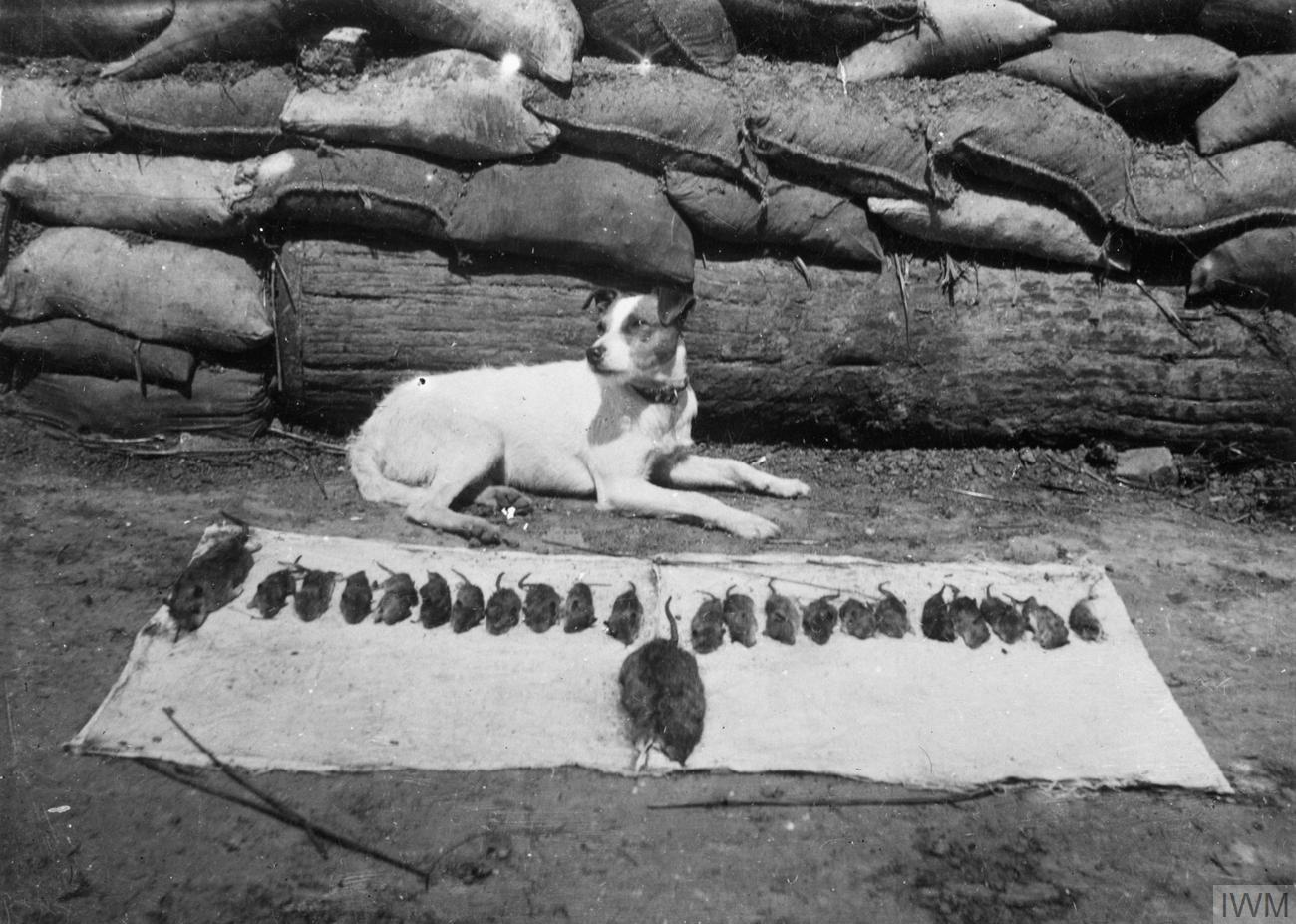
Pet dog of the Middlesex Regiment with its catch of rats in the trenches

Ammunition had to be conserved for fighting the enemy, therefore soldiers were dissuaded from using bullets to kill the numerous rats in the trenches. Other methods of killing rats were acceptable, be it through animals or bayonets although other attempted solutions were also implemented. Soldiers were often given monetary incentive to kill trench rats when they could. For example, in the French army, the quartermaster's office promised a bonus of 50 cents for each rat tail presented. At other times, rat-catchers were also hired by the army to catch the rats in the trenches as soldiers could not and were scared to fall asleep due to the rodents.

=== Chemicals ===
One of the first attempted solutions for ridding the trenches of rats was to use chemicals. Widespread use of gases composed of arsenic trioxide, carbon disulfide, and scillitin (squills extract) were used. Due to the high toxicity of the gases, these methods were abandoned after they were shown to have more effect on the soldiers themselves rather than the rats they were targeting.

=== Animals ===
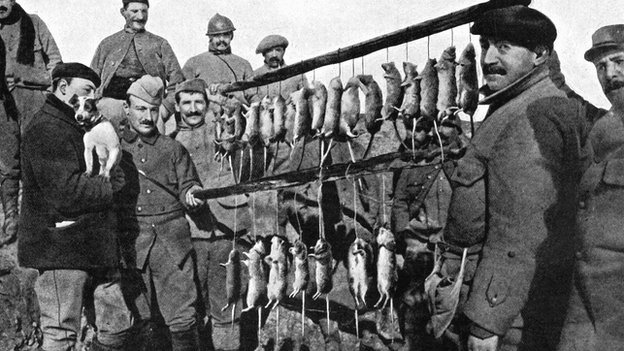
Rat-hunters with terrier dog

Another method was bringing in other animals to catch the rats. For example, cats and dogs were kept by soldiers in the trenches to "help maintain hygiene" by culling the rodent population. Terrier dogs were especially useful, more so than cats, as they were bred to kill vermin and for hunting purposes which was applied to eliminating rats in the trenches. As such, many terriers were used as 'ratting dogs'.

=== After the war ===
After World War I, the French used chloropicrin gas to destroy the remaining rat infestation from the trenches, flushing them from their burrows and causing the rats to asphyxiate on the gas. Although the lack of scholarship and media coverage on the topic of trench rats in World War I suggests the decrease in their population, and therefore, the success of such procedures, it is unknown whether all the trench rats had been eradicated at the time after the use of chemicals to flush them out and what happened to the trench rats living within the trench system after the war was over.

== Legacy ==
=== World War II ===
Overall, the presence of trench rats likely contributed to the psychological effects on soldiers post-World War I. As such, trench warfare was no longer as frequently used in World War II partly because of its high cost of human life and long-lasting effects on soldiers due to post-traumatic stress disorder. Another reason why trenches were no longer used was because in World War II, military tactics changed to favor aerial combat and with the emergence of improved technology which enhanced mobility on the battlefield, such as the use of tanks and armoured personnel carriers, which then allowed soldiers some form of protection against enemy fire while advancing against enemy lines.

=== In media ===
As they could be found in the majority of the trenches along the Western Front, trench rats were an integral part of popular culture at the front both during and after the war, especially in France and among the Allied countries. However, the rats themselves were less commonly referenced because the soldiers often refer to it more generally as an aspect of trench warfare. Although they were often depicted in a negative light, some media used rats as metaphors for the life of a soldier living in the trenches. They were present in music, photos and artistic representations - such was the culture of the trenches.

=== In fictional portrayal ===
Trench rats are often portrayed in modern films about World War I, with specific films such as Deathwatch (2002), Passchendaele (2008) and 1917 (2019) showing scenes where the rats chewed off an injured soldier's legs, came out of a corpse and ate from the rations hung up by soldiers—portraying the rats in a horrifying light.

In Erich Maria Remarque's All Quiet on the Western Front, they are referred to as "corpse-rats," described as having "shocking, evil, naked faces," and are said to have attacked and eaten two large cats and a dog.

Contrarily, in Ferdinand: A Country Rat in the Trenches (2016), a short animated film about World War I from the viewpoint of a French soldier, director Jean-Jacques Prunés uses the trench rat as a metaphor for the experience of a soldier living in the trenches. Prunés' portrayal instead humanizes and generates a sympathy for an animal that is often associated with the worst connotations of World War I and life in the trenches.

=== In poems ===
In Isaac Rosenberg's poem, "Break of Day in the Trenches", the speaker contemplates the folly of war, viewing the trench rat as an outsider to the conflict while questioning how it understands the destruction of war. There is irony used in the poem as an insignificant creature such as a rat could successfully complete the herculean effort of crossing to the other side, for example, when the speaker depicts of the ability of the rat to touch both a German's hand and a British soldier's hand, connecting both enemies and be "cosmopolitan" by being able to cross 'No man's land' to either the British or German trenches. In a sense, the poem portrays the rat in a positive light as the speaker believes it could perform amazing feats, such as crossing 'No man's land' with no repercussions, that no ordinary German or British soldier could on the battlefield.

=== In song ===
With numerous trench rats present in the trenches, the infantry who served in the French army created songs about their everyday experiences. One song specifically depicted rats as the only thing that the soldiers were fearful of - "Les canons, les canons, j'm'en fous. J'ai peur des rats", which is translated into "The guns, the guns, I don't care. I'm afraid of rats". The lyrics suggest that the French saw the rats in a negative light, perhaps due to the actions of the rats - their unhygienic nature as well as their tendencies to steal food and gnaw at corpses.

=== In scholarly resources ===
There has been more scholarship and news articles on trench rats from the countries whose troops served in the trenches along the Western Front such as France and Britain. This is because trenches dug by both the Central and Allied armies had been created along the Western Front near France and Belgium, and this front's military strategy was distinguished by stalemates and trench warfare. More focus has been placed on trench rats by the French, likely due to the location of the trenches, as they had mostly been dug on French soil and as such it would have been easier to send French reporters to report on the issue than those from other Allied countries. On the other hand, there has been less scholarship from the Eastern Front on trench rats as their military strategies have been focused on making breakthroughs with large advances and making sweeping movements rather than on trench warfare.

== Bibliography ==
- Control, PGM & SON Pest (2021-11-12). "World War I – Trench Rats". PGM Pest Control. Retrieved 2022-03-18.
- Duffy, Michael (22 August 2009). "Encyclopedia - Trench Rats". www.firstworldwar.com. Retrieved 2022-03-18.
- "Eastern Front | International Encyclopedia of the First World War (WW1)". encyclopedia.1914-1918-online.net. Retrieved 2022-03-18.
- FERDINAND A COUNTRY RAT IN THE TRENCHES, retrieved 2022-03-18.
- "Histoires 14-18 : Il y a cent ans, Gaspard, le rat des tranchées". France 3 Hauts-de-France (in French). Retrieved 2022-03-18.
- Humbert, Bryce; Bailey, Joseph (2020-07-29). "Trench Warfare in World War 1".
- "La boue, les poux et les rats dans les tranchées de la prmière guerre mondiale". www.histoire-en-questions.fr. Retrieved 2022-03-18.
- 'Life in the trenches', URL: https://nzhistory.govt.nz/war/new-zealanders-in-belgium/a-soldiers-lot, (Ministry for Culture and Heritage), updated 20-Sep-2017.
- Soppelsa, Peter (2021). "Losing France's Imperial War on Rats". Journal of the Western Society for French History. 47. ISSN 2573-5012.
- "The trenches and trench warfare", World War One, Cambridge University Press, pp. 198–203, retrieved 2022-03-18.
- "Trench Rats Facts & Information | Free GCSE Worksheet". School History. 2016-06-24. Retrieved 2022-03-18.
- "Voices of the First World War: Trench Life". Imperial War Museums. Retrieved 2022-03-18.
- "William Osler and investigation on trench nephritis". GIN (in Italian). 2016-02-18. Retrieved 2022-03-18.
