= Serafina and the Twisted Staff =

2016 historical fiction and fantasy novel

- First edition
- Author: Robert Beatty
- Cover artist: Maria Elias
- Series: Serafina Series (book 2)
- Genre: Fantasy, Historical Fiction, Middle-Grade novel
- Set in: Asheville, N.C 1899
- Published: July 12th, 2016
- Publisher: Disney Hyperion
- Publication place: United States
- Media type: Print (hardcover and paperback), audiobook, e-book
- Pages: 370
- ISBN: 9781484775035
- OCLC: 932173988
- LC Class: PZ7.1.B4347 Sh 2016
- Preceded by: Serafina and the Black Cloak
- Followed by: Serafina and the Splintered Heart
- Website: robertbeattybooks.com

Serafina and the Twisted Staff is an American historical fiction and fantasy novel written by Robert Beatty and published in 2016. It is the second novel in the Serafina Series and the sequel to Serafina and the Black Cloak. This book continues the spooky adventures of twelve-year-old Serafina, Chief Rat Catcher of the Biltmore Estate, as she works with best-friend Braeden Vanderbilt to save the people and animals of Biltmore and the surrounding forests from a series of sinister attacks. In order to defeat this evil entity before it destroys her home and those she cares about, she must search deep within to discover and embrace the destiny that awaits her.

== Reception ==
Serafina and the Twisted Staff was released on July 12, 2016 by Disney Hyperion and debuted at #1 on the New York Times Best Seller list. Serafina and the Twisted Staff received other notable recognitions including 2016 Barnes & Noble Best Books for Young Readers and 2016 Amazon Best Books for Young Readers. Serafina and the Twisted Staff is preceded by Serafina and the Black Cloak and followed by Serafina and the Splintered Heart. A fourth book in the series, titled Serafina and the Seven Stars, was released in July 2019.
