= Ratcatcher's Day =

Ratcatcher' Day
- Date: 26 June or 22 July
- Frequency: annual

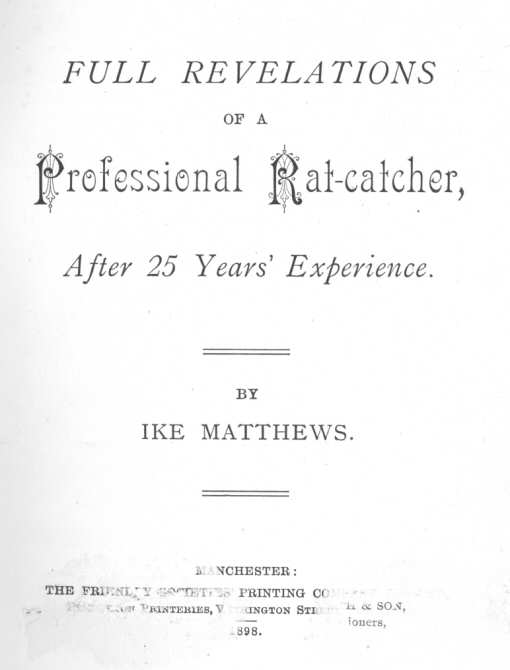
Cover of the 1898 publication Full Revelations of a Professional Rat-Catcher by Ike Matthews

Ratcatcher's Day, Rat-catcher's Day or Rat Catcher's Day is celebrated on 26 June or 22 July, commemorating the myth of the Pied Piper of Hamelin.

== Overview ==
The town of Hamelin in Germany uses the June date and the term "Pied Piper Day". The confusion of dates is because the Brothers Grimm cite 26 June 1284 as the date the Pied Piper led the children out of the town, while the poem by Robert Browning gives it as 22 July 1376. It is a holiday remembering rat-catchers, similar to Secretary's Day and Presidents Day.
