= Rat guard =

Obstacle of a ship or building

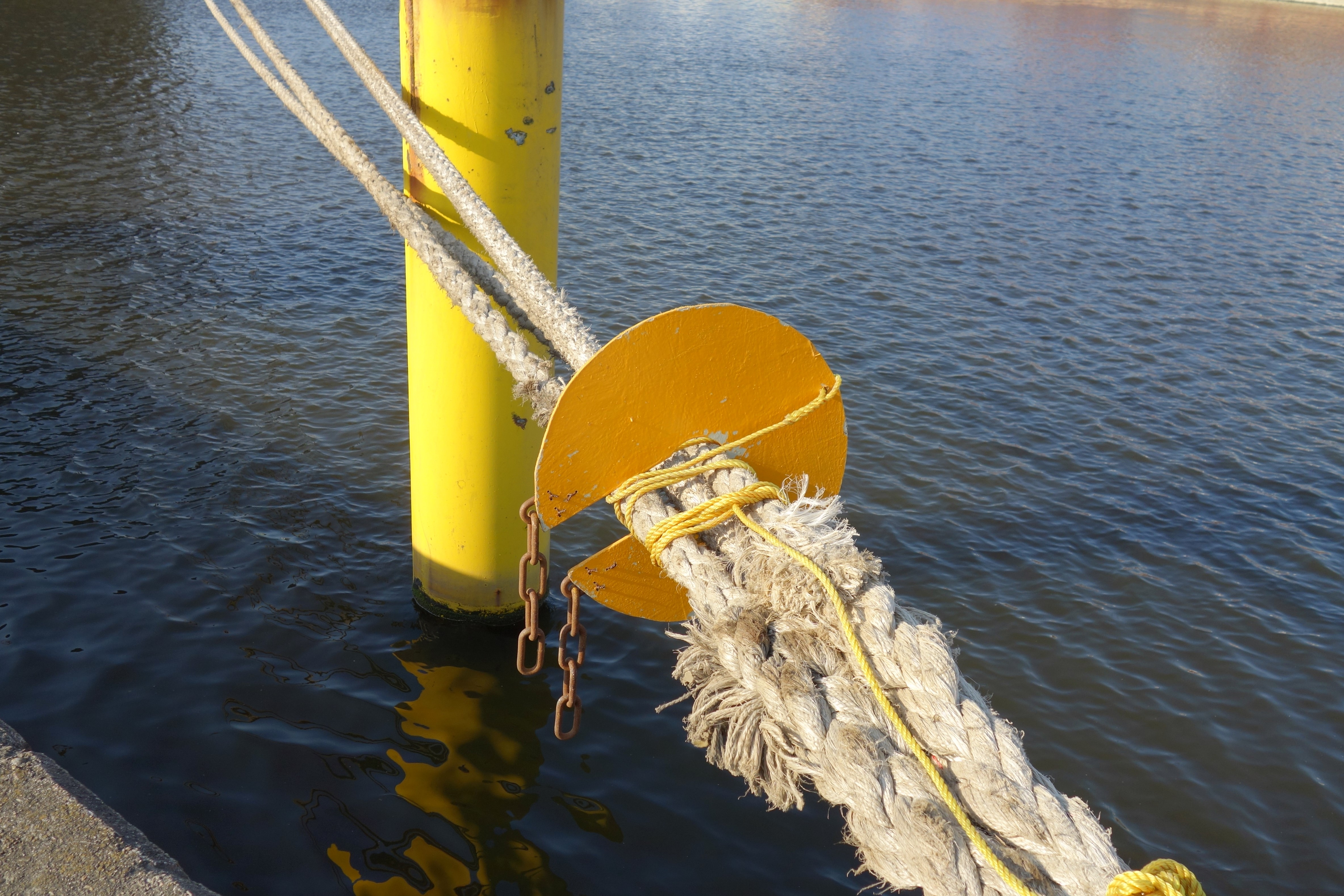
Rat guard fitted to the rope of a modern ship

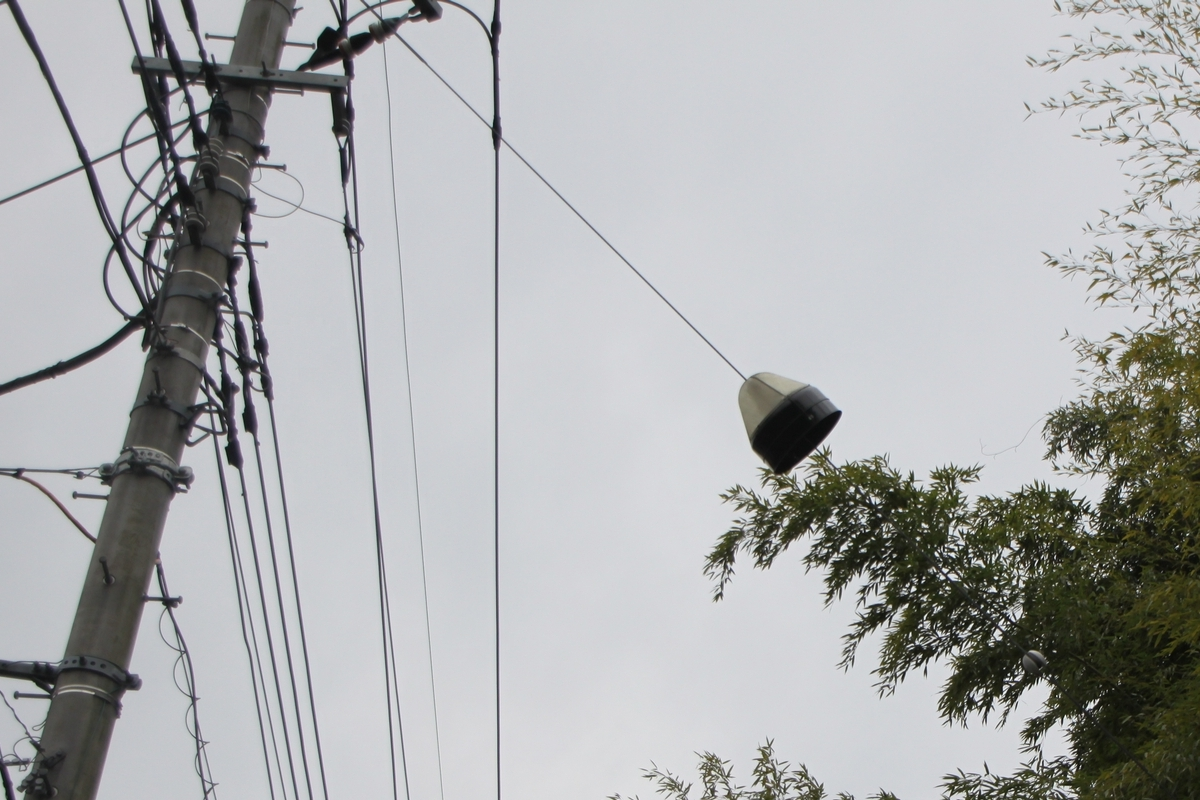
Rat guard fitted to a power line

A rat guard is a device used to prevent rats from boarding ships or entering buildings via ropes, cables, or wires. These guards are typically conical or disc-shaped and are designed to stop rats from climbing by creating a physical barrier they cannot pass. Rat guards are essential in maritime environments and areas where rats pose a threat to goods, vessels, and infrastructure. They are a crucial tool in protecting vessels, storage facilities, and offshore installations from rats, preventing potential damage and health risks caused by these pests.

== Design and function ==
Rat guards work by creating an obstacle that prevents rats from climbing along lines such as mooring ropes or cables. The guards are generally made from metal or durable plastic and feature a smooth, sloped surface that rats cannot grip or climb. When installed correctly, the shape of the guard causes rats attempting to climb to slip off, preventing them from reaching the other side.

The rat guards are positioned on ropes or cables a few feet away from the dock or vessel to stop rats from bypassing the guard by jumping across. These devices are particularly effective because they exploit the rats' inability to navigate the smooth, conical surface of the guard.

== Common uses ==
Rat guards are primarily used in maritime and industrial settings where rats pose a risk of infestation or damage. Common places where rat guards are used include ports and harbours, warehouses and storage facilities, and on offshore oil platforms.

== Materials and installation ==
Rat guards are commonly made from steel, aluminum, or strong plastic materials to ensure durability and to prevent rats from chewing through them. The guards are installed a short distance away from where the cable connects to the ship, dock, or building to ensure rats cannot bypass the guard.
