= Serafina and the Black Cloak =

2015 novel by Robert Beatty

- First edition
- Author: Robert Beatty
- Cover artist: Maria Elias
- Series: Serafina Series (book 1)
- Genre: Fantasy, Historical Fiction, Middle-Grade novel
- Set in: Asheville, N.C 1899
- Published: July 14th, 2015
- Publisher: Disney Hyperion
- Publication place: United States
- Media type: Print (hardcover and paperback), audiobook, e-book
- Pages: 293
- ISBN: 9781484709016
- OCLC: 1023815721
- LC Class: PZ7.1.B4347 Sh 2016
- Followed by: Serafina and the Twisted Staff
- Website: robertbeattybooks

Serafina and the Black Cloak is a 2015 American historical fiction and fantasy novel written by Robert Beatty. It is the first novel in the Serafina Series and the prequel to Serafina and the Twisted Staff. This book follows the spooky adventures of twelve-year-old Serafina, Chief Rat Catcher of the Biltmore Estate, as she works with friend Braeden Vanderbilt, a fictitious member of the historical Vanderbilt family, to uncover the true identity of The Man in the Black Cloak who is responsible for the mysterious disappearance of several of the estate's youngest guests.

Serafina and the Black Cloak was released on July 14, 2015, by Disney Hyperion and has been the recipient of numerous awards and nominations, including the 2016 Pat Conroy Southern Book Prize and the Goodreads #1 Middle Grade Novel of 2015. Serafina and the Black Cloak is followed by Serafina and the Twisted Staff, Serafina and the Splintered Heart, and Serafina and the Seven Stars.

== Synopsis ==
Set in late 1800's, specifically a fortnight before the Christian holiday Christmas of the year 1889, Serafina and the Black Cloak opens on the titular character, Serafina, going about her duties as the Chief Rat Catcher, or C.R.C, of Biltmore Estate.
