= Willa of the Wood =

2018 novel by Robert Beatty

- Author: Robert Beatty
- Cover artist: Millie Liu
- Series: Willa Series (book 1)
- Genre: Fantasy, Historical Fiction, Middle-Grade novel
- Set in: Great Smoky Mountains, Tennessee, North Carolina 1899
- Published: July 10th, 2018
- Publisher: Disney Hyperion
- Publication place: United States
- Media type: Print (hardcover and paperback), audiobook, e-book
- Pages: 376
- ISBN: 9781368005845
- OCLC: 1023815721
- LC Class: PZ7.1.B4347 Wi 2018
- Website: Robert Beatty Books

Willa of the Wood is an American adventure and fantasy novel written by Robert Beatty and published in July 2018 by Disney Hyperion. Willa of the Wood is the first novel in the Willa Series and will be adapted into a television series produced by Amy Adams’ Bond Group and eOne. Robert Beatty will serve as an executive producer.

Willa of the Wood is set at the turn of the 20th century in the Western North Carolina and East Tennessee region of the Appalachian Mountains, in what is now Great Smoky Mountains National Park. The book follows Willa, a young night-spirit and thief for the ancient Faeran clan. Willa is taught not to trust the “day-folk”, or humans, who destroy the forests that she calls home. During her adventures, Willa begins to question tradition as she experiences conflict within her Faeran clan and finds an ally and friend in someone she once feared.

== Reception ==
A #1 New York Times best-seller, Willa of the Wood has been recognized by several literary organizations and publications for its success as a middle grade historical fiction and fantasy novel. Willa of the Wood was a USA today best-seller, selected by The Children's Book Review as a Best Book of 2018, nominated for 2018 Goodreads’ Choice Award, and recognized as a Recommended Title by the Great Smoky Mountains National Park.
