= Robert Beatty (author) =

American author and entrepreneur

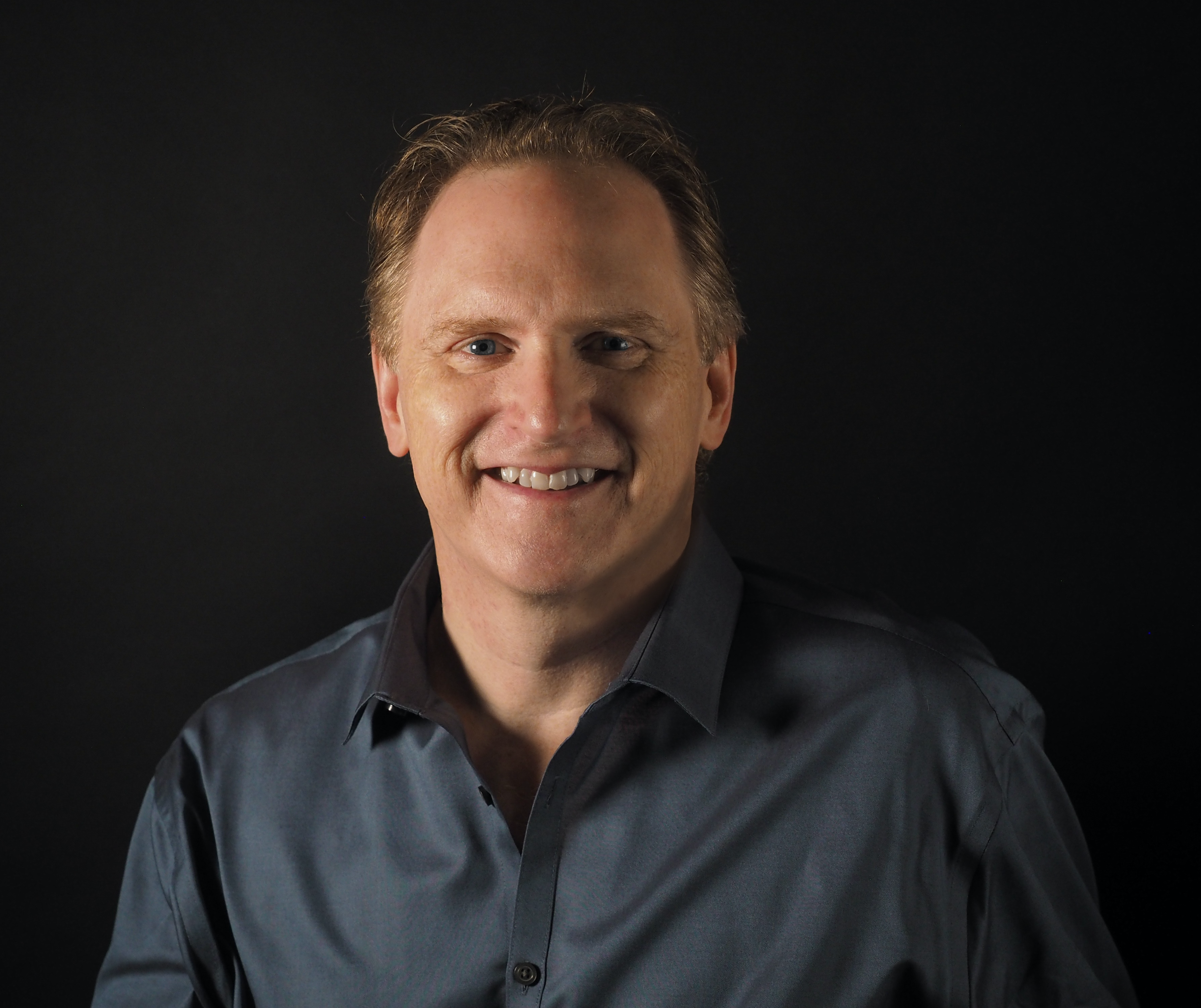
- Education: Bachelors in mechanical engineering (BSME) with a concentration in computer science and computer aided manufacturing
- Occupations: Novelist, technology-entrepreneur
- Writing career
- Genres: Fantasy, historical fiction, middle-grade
- Website: robertbeattybooks.com

Robert Beatty is an American technology entrepreneur and author of historical fiction, fantasy novels. He has published six books with Disney Hyperion, which have been translated to over 20 foreign languages. Beatty is an executive producer for the television adaptation of Willa of the Wood, which is in the early stages of development.

== Early life ==
Beatty began writing at the age of 11 when his mother provided him with an old electric typewriter to play with. He was an avid reader of fantasy and wrote books in his free time.

After receiving a TI-99 personal computer from his father, Beatty taught himself to code and learned six programming languages prior to enrolling in college. From 15 years old until he entered college, he worked as a draftsman at a company that constructed automated assembly lines. Beatty learned that he was effective at troubleshooting and streamlining production.

Robert Beatty attended Michigan State University where he earned a degree in mechanical engineering with an emphasis in computer science. His continued interest in writing led him to enroll in literature courses, as well.

== Career ==
=== Technology entrepreneur ===
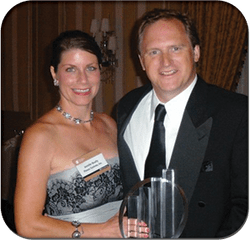
Beatty earns Ernst and Young Entrepreneur of the Year award

While still in engineering school, Beatty gained employment as an engineer drafting automotive parts for a local manufacturer called MSP. Frustrated with the disorganization and inefficiency of the factory, Beatty created and implemented a communication system called Plexus at MSP that successfully improved and restructured the operation of the company.

Following the successful transformation of MSP, the Plexus software was in high demand among companies seeking to streamline manufacturing, lower costs, and improve quality control. Beatty and Richard McDermott, president and owner of MSP, started Plexus Systems, LLC in 1995 to meet this demand and sell customized Plexus software designed by Beatty to meet the specific needs of each company. As the CEO and chief architect of Plexus, Beatty became one of the leading pioneers in the development of cloud computing. Beatty was the 2007 recipient of the Ernst & Young Entrepreneur of the Year Award.

=== Novelist ===
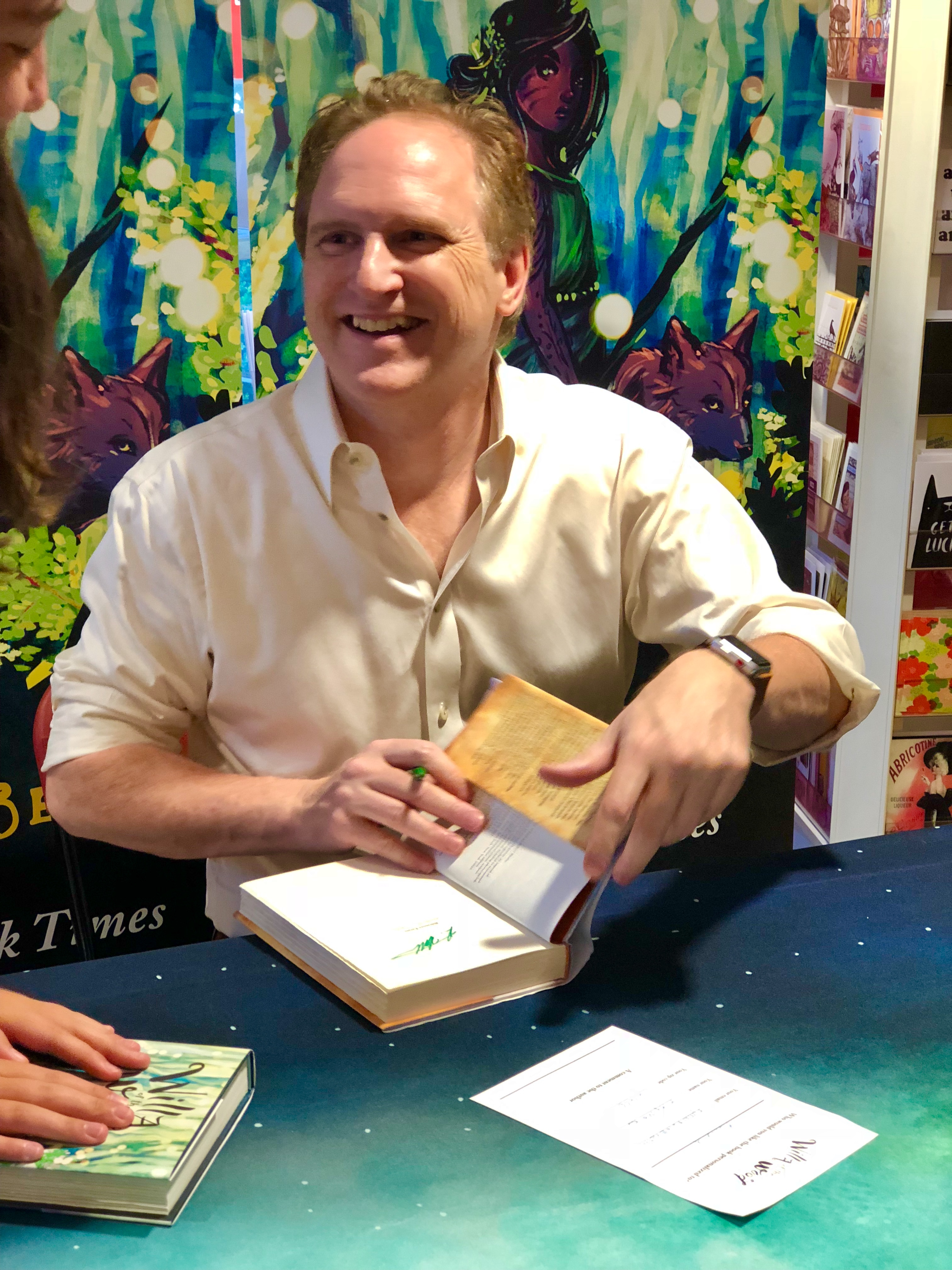
Beatty autographing books and greeting fans at an author event

In 2006, Beatty sold the majority of his shares in Plexus, but continued with the company as a technical consultant and Chairman of the Board, at which time Beatty began to focus on his writing career.

Intent on improving his writing skills, Beatty developed relationships with the editors of Narrative Magazine. He later served as Narrative Magazine’s Chief Technical Officer, a member of the board of directors, and eventually Chairman of the Board.

Encouraged by his eldest daughter, Beatty began to write for a younger audience. With the encouragement and support of his family, he wrote the first book in the Serafina Series, Serafina and the Black Cloak, which was acquired by Disney Hyperion. Understanding the importance of marketing from his experience with Plexus Systems, LLC , Beatty and his family produced a book trailer for Serafina and the Black Cloak. The book trailer was an important component of the successful launch of Serafina and the Black Cloak on July 14, 2015, which eventually rose to the #1 spot on the New York Times Bestseller List and remained on the list for over 60 weeks.

Following the success of Serafina and the Black Cloak, Disney Hyperion decided to create a series based on “Serafina” and contracted two more novels with Beatty. Serafina and the Twisted Staff was released on July 12, 2016, debuting at #1 on the New York Times Bestseller List. Serafina and the Splintered Heart launched July 3, 2017 placing the Serafina Series on the New York Times Bestseller List. Beatty's success continued with the debut of the first book in a new series, Willa of the Wood, which launched at #1 on the New York Times Bestseller List in the summer of 2018. Disney Hyperion signed Robert Beatty for three more novels: Serafina and the Seven Stars released in July 2019, Willa of Dark Hollow released in spring of 2021, and an additional novel yet to be determined.

=== Television production ===
Beatty will serve as an executive producer for the television adaption of Willa of the Wood. The dramatic rights for the Willa book series were purchased by eOne. eOne has signed Amy Adams’ and her company Bond Group Entertainment to produce the TV series.

== Awards and nominations ==
- Amazon Best Books for Young Readers
  - 2016: Serafina and the Twisted Staff
  - 2017: Serafina and the Splintered Heart
  - 2018: Willa of the Wood
  - 2019: Serafina and the Seven Stars
- Barnes & Noble Best Books for Young Readers
  - 2016: Serafina and the Twisted Staff
  - 2018: Willa of the Wood
  - 2019: Serafina and the Seven Stars
- Books-A-Million Best Books 2017: Serafina and the Splintered Heart
- Brightly, Middle Grade Books for Environmentally Conscious Kids 2018: Willa of the Wood
- Cybils Award, Elementary Middle Grade Speculative Fiction Nominee 2018: Willa of the Wood
- Ernst & Young Entrepreneur of the Year 2007
- Friends of the Smoky Mountains Recommended Title
  - 2018: Willa of the Wood
  - 2019: Serafina and the Seven Stars
- Goodreads #1 Middle Grade Novel 2015: Serafina and the Black Cloak
- Mythopoeic Fantasy Award Nominee for Children's Literature 2016: Serafina and the Black Cloak
- Pat Conroy Southern Book Prize 2016: Serafina and the Black Cloak
- PopSugar, The Best books for Kids 2018: Willa of the Wood
- Rebecca Caudill Young Readers' Book Award Nominee 2020: Serafina and the Black Cloak
- South Carolina Book Award Finalist 2018: Serafina and the Black Cloak
- The Children's Book Review Best Book of 2018: Willa of the Wood
- Volunteer State Book Award 2017-2018: Serafina and the Black Cloak

== Bibliography ==
=== Serafina series ===
1. Serafina and the Black Cloak (2015)
2. Serafina and the Twisted Staff (2016)
3. Serafina and the Splintered Heart (2017)
4. Serafina and the Seven Stars (2019)

=== Willa series ===
1. Willa of the Wood (2018)
2. Willa of Dark Hollow (2021)
