= Rat-catcher =

Type of professional in pest control

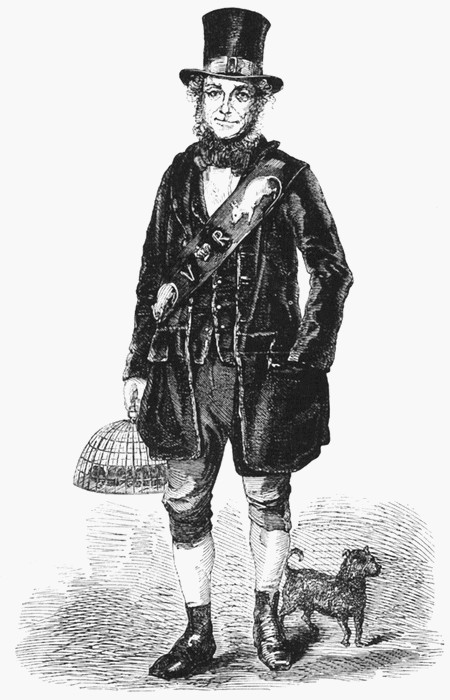
Jack Black, rat-catcher, 1851

A rat-catcher is a person who kills or captures rats as a professional form of pest control. Keeping the rat population under control was practiced in Europe to prevent the spread of diseases, most notoriously the Black Death, and to prevent damage to food supplies. In modern developed countries, such a professional is otherwise known as a pest control operative or pest exterminator.

== Anecdotal history ==
A famous rat-catcher from Victorian England was Jack Black, who is known through Henry Mayhew's interview for London Labour and the London Poor.

== Techniques ==
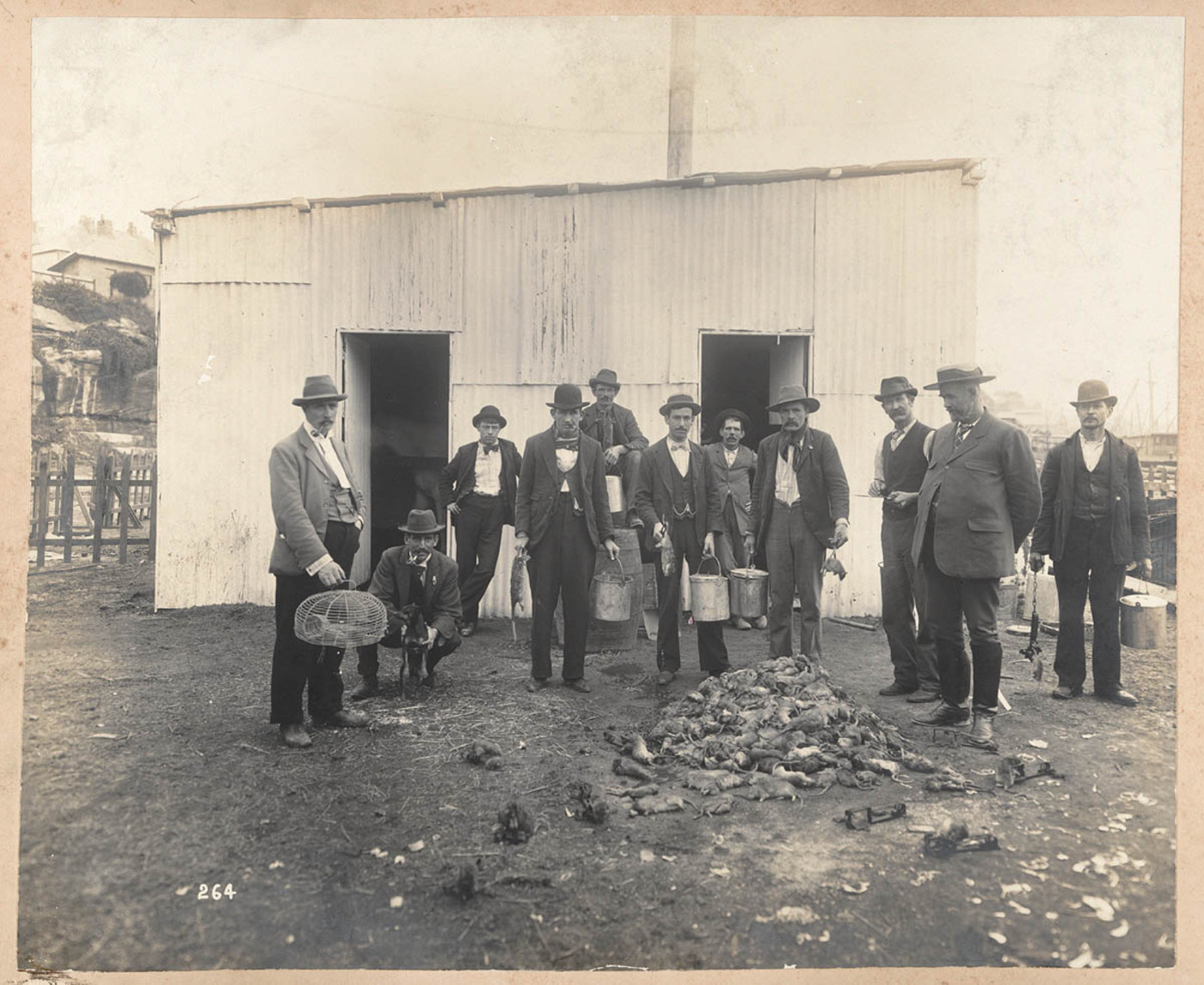
Professional rat-catchers behind a pile of dead rats, during the outbreak of bubonic plague in Sydney in 1900

Rat-catchers may attempt to capture rats themselves, or release "ratters", animals trained or naturally skilled at catching them. They may also set a rat trap or other traps.

Modern methods of rat control include traps, poisoned bait, introducing predators, reducing litter, smoke machines, and clearing of current or potential nest sites.

=== Ratters ===
A "ratter" usually refers to a dog used for catching or killing rats. This includes specially-bred terriers for vermin-hunting, which may be known as Rat Terriers, although the latter may refer to a breed that was historically developed in rat-baiting.

=== Conditions and risks ===
Rats are rarely seen in the open, preferring to hide in holes, haystacks and dark locations. A rat-catcher's risk of being bitten is high, as is the risk of acquiring a disease from a rat bite.

== Gallery ==
Rat-catchers in art

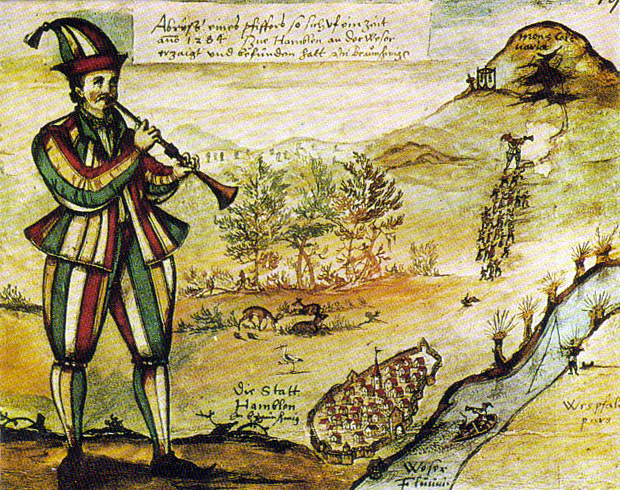
The oldest picture of the Pied Piper of Hamelin, copied from the glass window of the Market Church in Hamelin

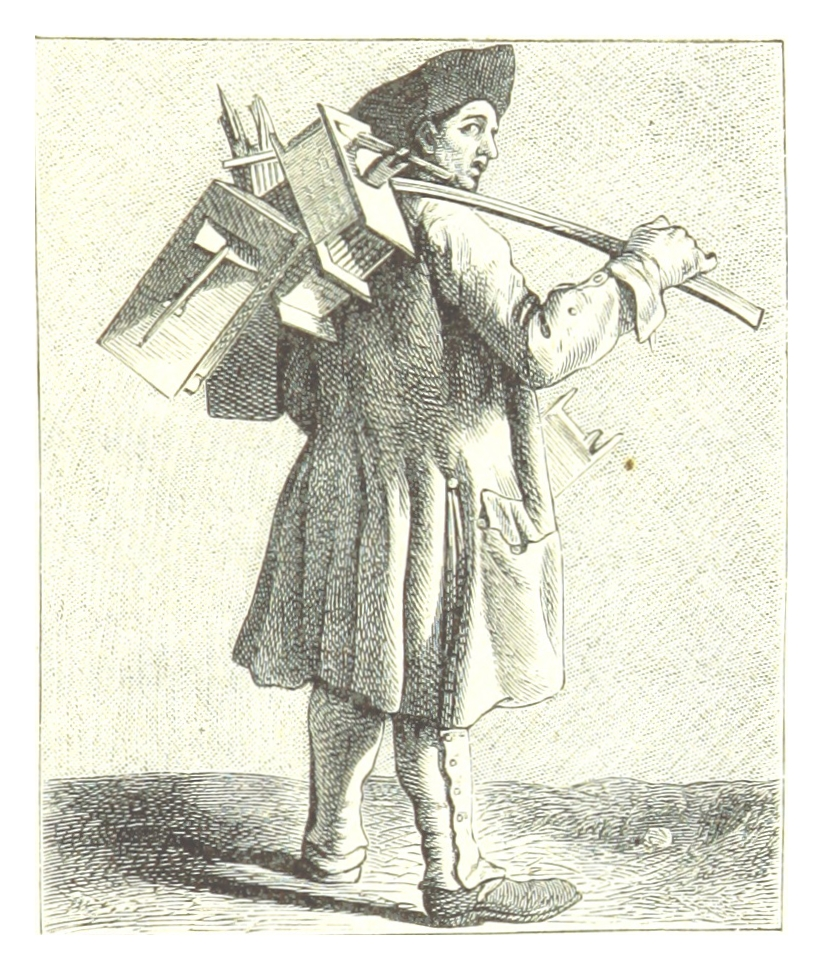
Death to the Rats, Edmé Bouchardon

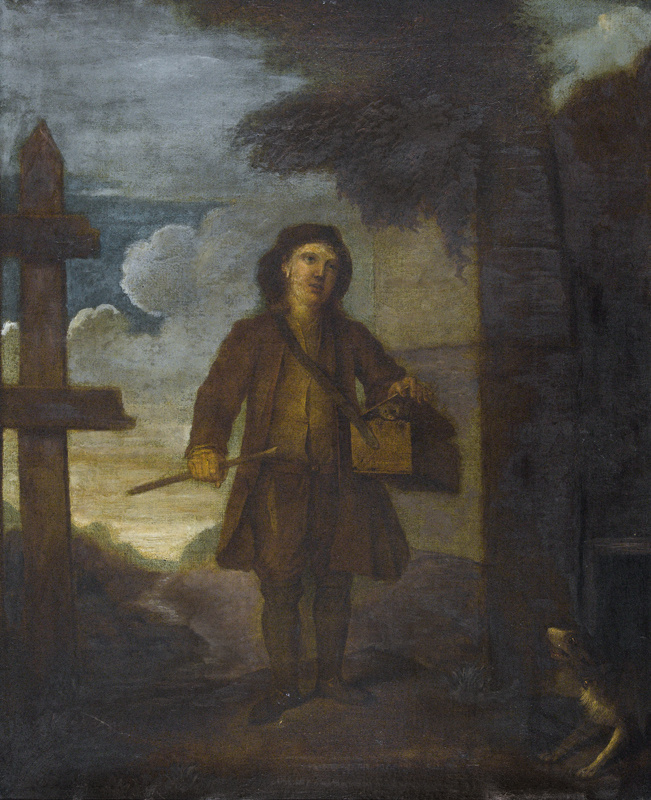
Rat-catcher, 18th century

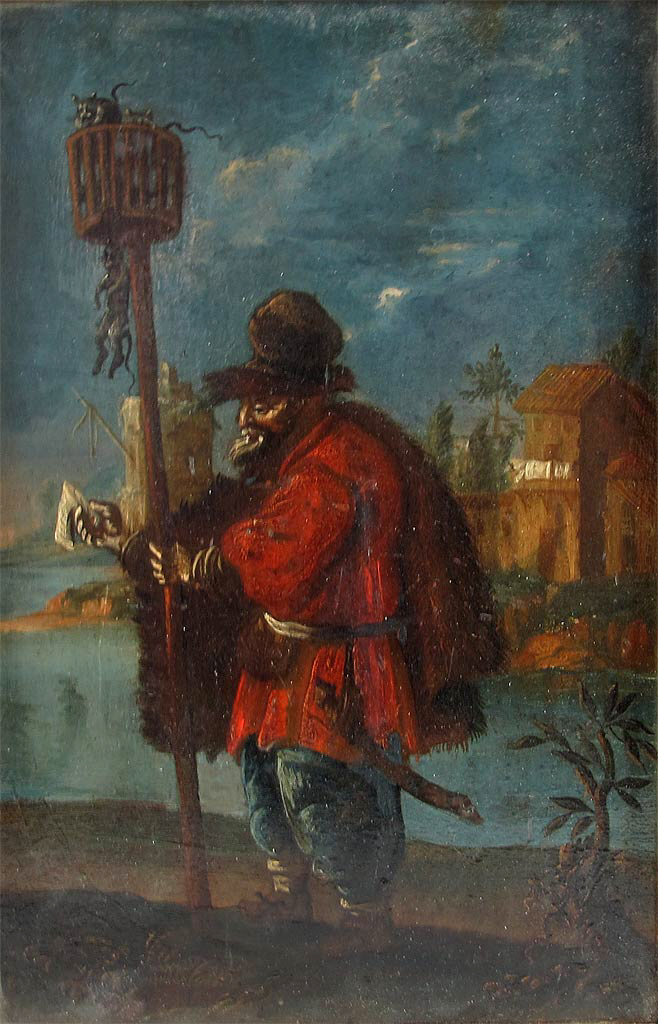
Rat-catcher, 19th century

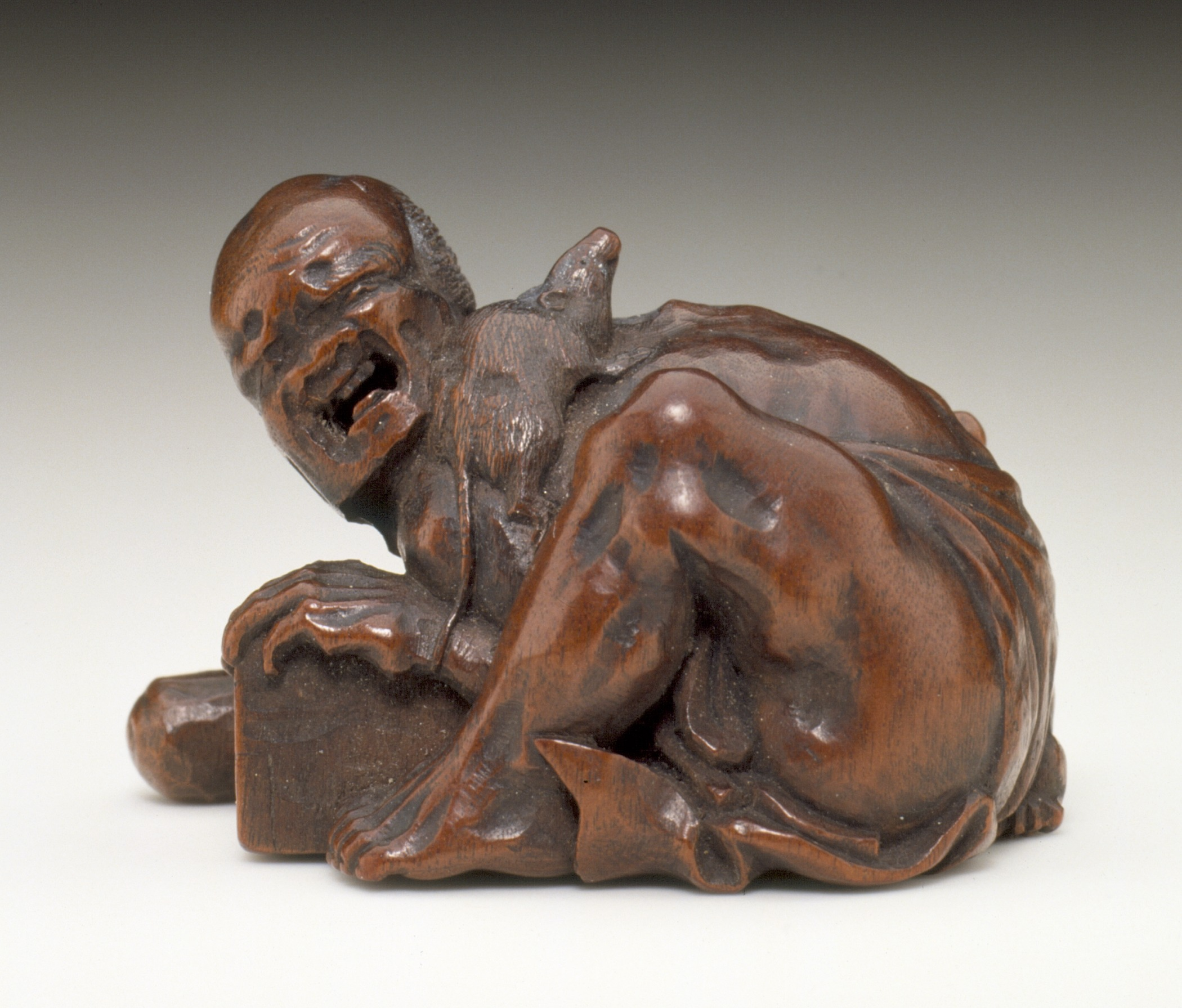
Frustrated Rat Catcher (Ittan (Japan, circa 1820–1877), Los Angeles County Museum of Art

== In popular culture ==
=== Folklore ===
- A famous fictional rat-catcher was the Pied Piper of Hamelin; different versions of his story have been adapted into a variety of media works.

=== Comic books ===
- In the DC Comics Universe, one of Batman's enemies is the Rat Catcher, alias Otis Flannegan, who was employed as a real rat-catcher for Gotham City. The Rat Catcher occasionally orchestrates rat plagues using his uncanny ability to control rats.

=== Film ===
- Rat catchers make a major appearance in Dario Argento's The Phantom of the Opera (1998 film).
- Ratcatcher (1999), written and directed by Lynne Ramsay, is her debut feature film.

=== Television ===
- Colin "Chopper" Mozart, rat-catcher, was featured in an episode of Monty Python's Flying Circus
- The character Charlie Kelly from It's Always Sunny in Philadelphia was responsible for catching and exterminating rats at Paddy’s Pub.

=== Literature ===
- Rat-catchers appear in George Eliot's The Mill on the Floss (1860).
- British author Roald Dahl's short story, "The Ratcatcher", was collected in Someone Like You (1953).
- Serafina, the Chief Rat Catcher of the Biltmore Estate in Asheville, N.C. Serafina is a fictional character created by author Robert Beatty and was first introduced in Serafina and the Black Cloak, a spooky, historical fiction novel. Serafina's mysterious adventures grew into a trilogy (Book 2: Serafina and the Twisted Staff, Book 3: Serafina and the Splintered Heart) and the fourth book in the series is due for release in summer 2019.

=== Music ===
- The humorous ballad "The Famous Rat-Catcher" (c. 1615)--sometimes referenced by the first line, "There was a rare rat-catcher"—evokes both the material culture of contemporary ratting and the verminous conduct of a particular practitioner. A fellow rat-catcher also carries treatments for venereal disease; it is not clear from either the song or the editor's commentary whether this was a common part of the rat-catching trade.

== See also ==
- List of books and articles about rats
- Rat-baiting
- Rat trap
- Ratcatcher's Day
- The Amazing Maurice and his Educated Rodents
- Trench rats
- Musahar
