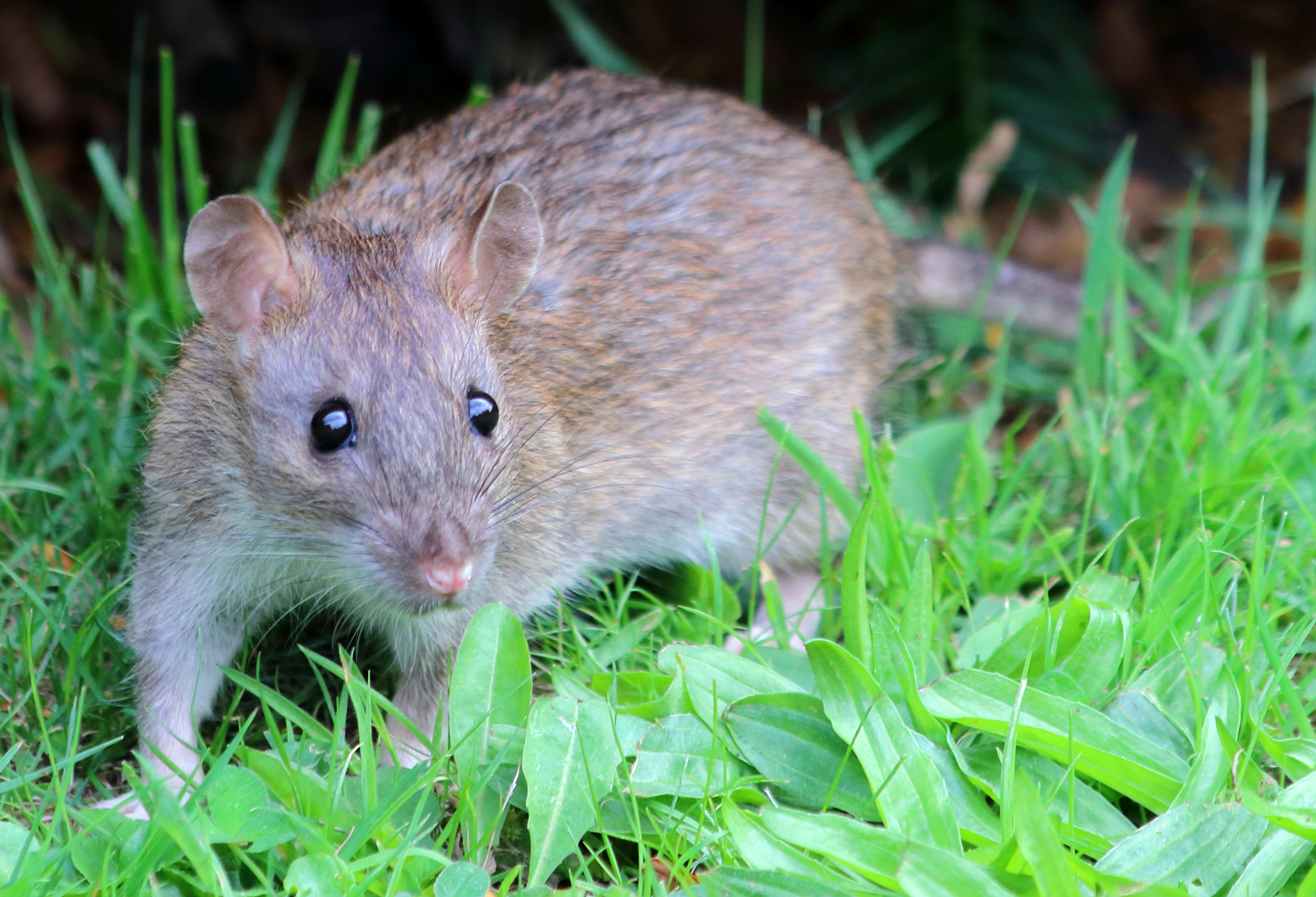
- Brown rat (Rattus norvegicus)

Scientific classification
- Kingdom: Animalia
- Phylum: Chordata
- Class: Mammalia
- Order: Rodentia
- Suborder: Myomorpha
- Superfamily: Muroidea

= Rat =

Rats

Several genera of rodents

Rats are various medium-sized, long-tailed rodents. Species of rats are found throughout the order Rodentia, with the genus Rattus containing the most familiar rats. Other rat genera include Neotoma (pack rats), Bandicota (bandicoot rats) and Dipodomys (kangaroo rats). Among the best-known rats are the black rat and brown rat, both of which are native to Asia. Rats belong to the same subfamily as mice and are often distinguished based on their size. Usually the common name of a large muroid rodent will include the word "rat", while a smaller muroid's name will include "mouse". The common terms rat and mouse are not taxonomically specific. Like mice, they are known to invade properties for food, water, warmth, and shelter. There are 56 known species of rats in the world.

Rats are found in every region inhabited by humans, excluding Antarctica. The most common species live alongside humans, but many diverse rat species are unique to island locations and are threatened by habitat loss or competition with other rodent species.

== Species and description ==
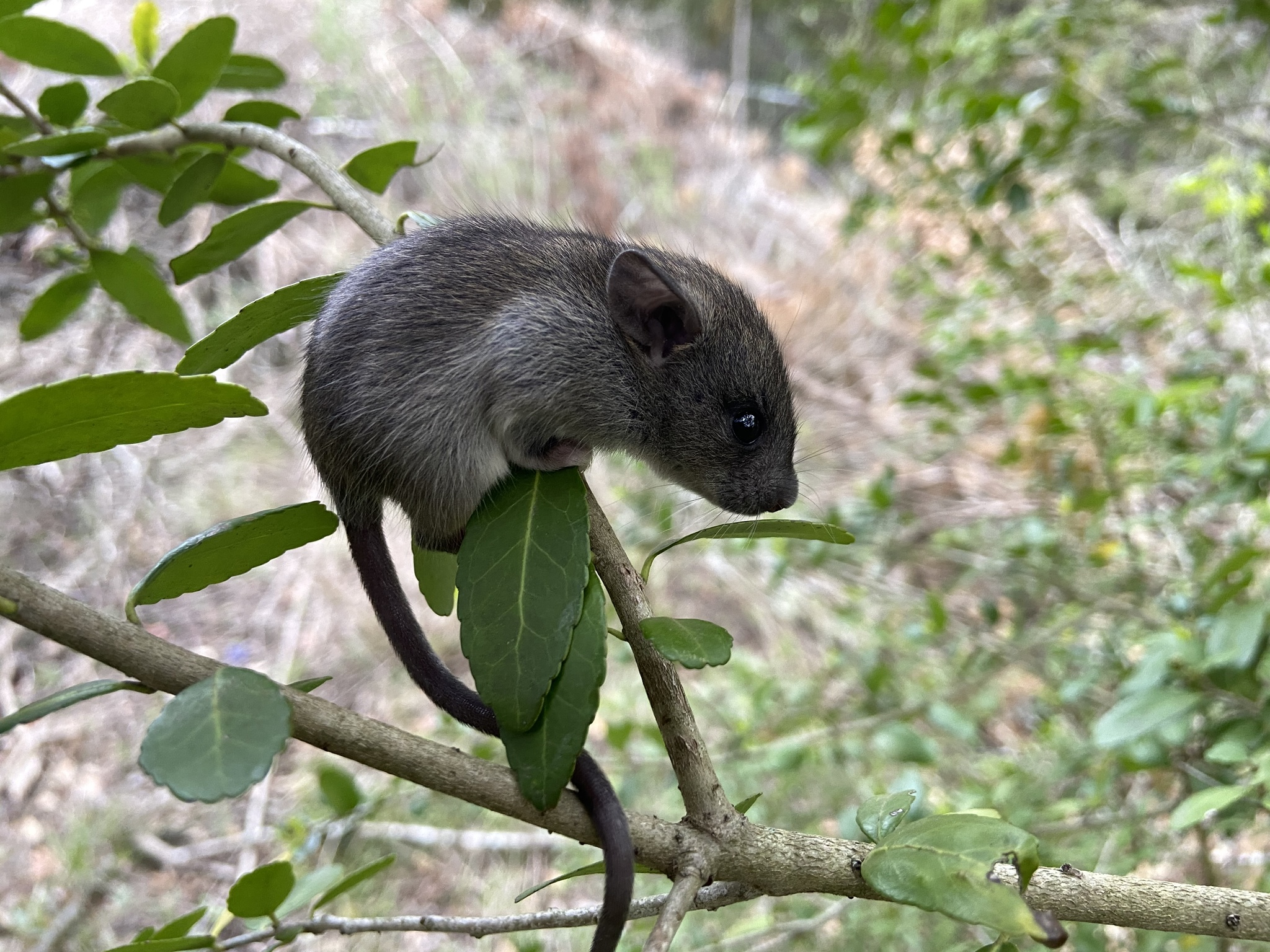
A black rat in Bee Cave, Texas

The best-known rat species are the black rat (Rattus rattus) and the brown rat (Rattus norvegicus). This group, generally known as the Old World rats or true rats, originated in Asia. Rats are bigger than most Old World mice, which are their relatives, but seldom weigh over 500 grams (17 1/2 oz) in the wild.

The term rat is also used in the names of other small mammals that are not true rats. Examples include the North American pack rats (also known as wood rats) and a number of species loosely called kangaroo rats. Rats such as the bandicoot rat (Bandicota bengalensis) are murine rodents related to true rats but are not members of the genus Rattus.

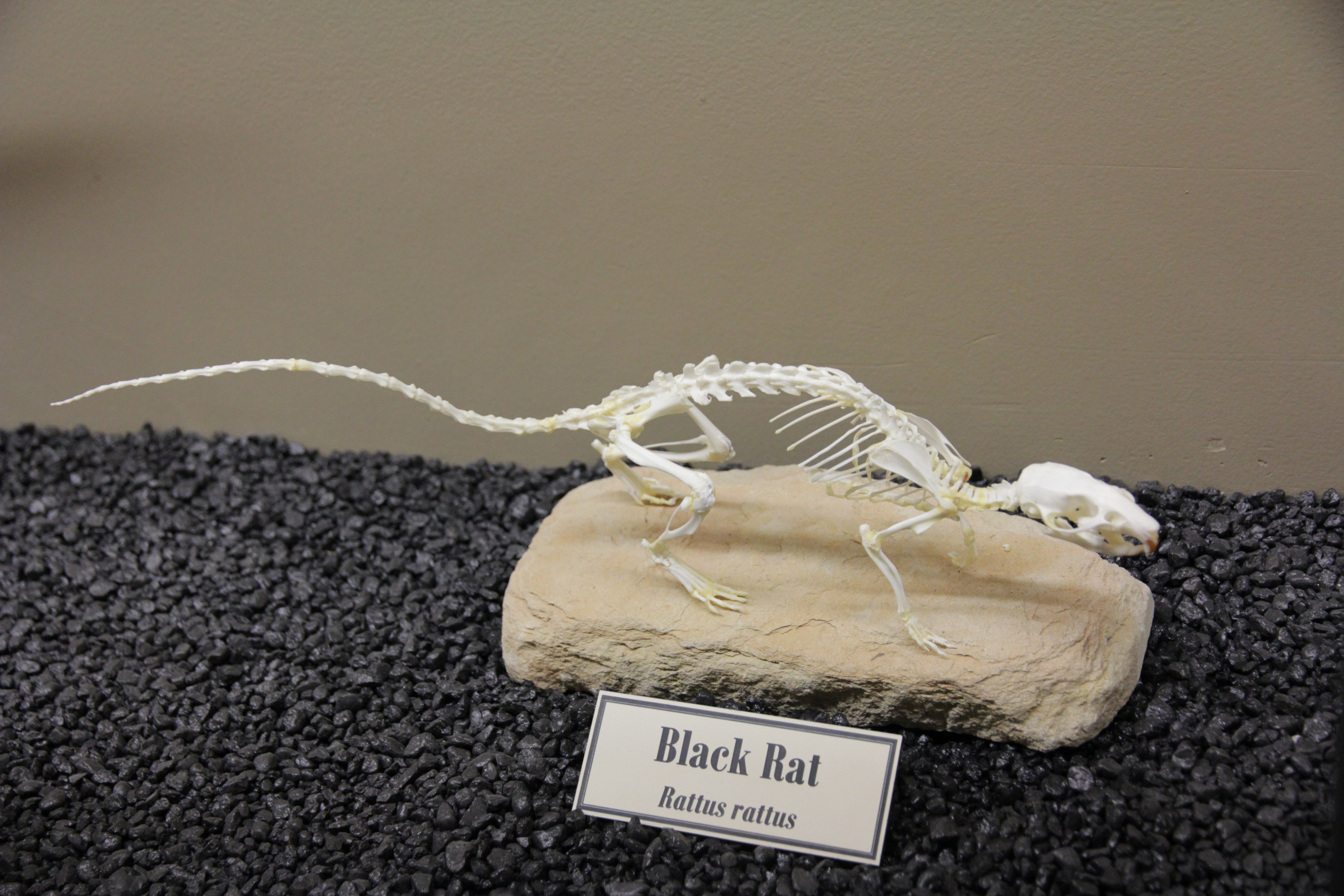
Skeleton of a black rat (Rattus rattus) on display at the Museum of Osteology

Male rats are called bucks; unmated females, does, pregnant or parent females, dams; and infants, kittens or pups. A group of rats is referred to as a mischief.

The common species are opportunistic survivors and often live with and near humans; therefore, they are known as commensals. They may cause substantial food losses, especially in developing countries. However, the widely distributed and problematic commensal species of rats are a minority in this diverse genus. Many species of rats are island endemics, some of which have become endangered due to habitat loss or competition with the brown, black, or Polynesian rat.

Wild rodents, including rats, can carry many different zoonotic pathogens, such as Leptospira, Toxoplasma gondii, and Campylobacter. The Black Death is traditionally believed to have been caused by the microorganism Yersinia pestis, carried by the tropical rat flea (Xenopsylla cheopis), which preyed on black rats living in European cities during the epidemic outbreaks of the Middle Ages; these rats were used as transport hosts. Another zoonotic disease linked to the rat is foot-and-mouth disease.

Rats become sexually mature at age 6 weeks, but reach social maturity at about 5 to 6 months of age. The average lifespan of rats varies by species, but many only live about a year due to predation.

The black and brown rats diverged from other Old World rats in the forests of Asia during the beginning of the Pleistocene.

== Rat tails ==
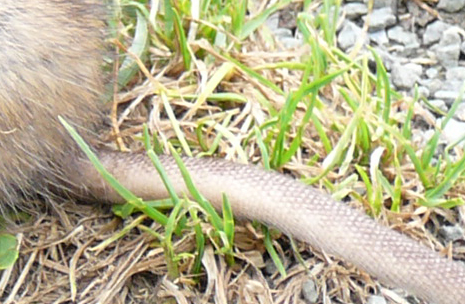
A closeup of a rat tail

The characteristic long tail of most rodents is a feature that has been extensively studied in various rat species models, which suggest three primary functions of this structure: thermoregulation, minor proprioception, and a nocifensive-mediated degloving response. Rodent tails—particularly in rat models—have been implicated with a thermoregulation function that follows from its anatomical construction. This particular tail morphology is evident across the family Muridae, in contrast to the bushier tails of Sciuridae, the squirrel family. The tail is hairless and thin skinned but highly vascularized, thus allowing for efficient countercurrent heat exchange with the environment. The high muscular and connective tissue densities of the tail, along with ample muscle attachment sites along its plentiful caudal vertebrae, facilitate specific proprioceptive senses to help orient the rodent in a three-dimensional environment. Murids have evolved a unique defense mechanism termed degloving that allows for escape from predation through the loss of the outermost integumentary layer on the tail. However, this mechanism is associated with multiple pathologies that have been the subject of investigation.

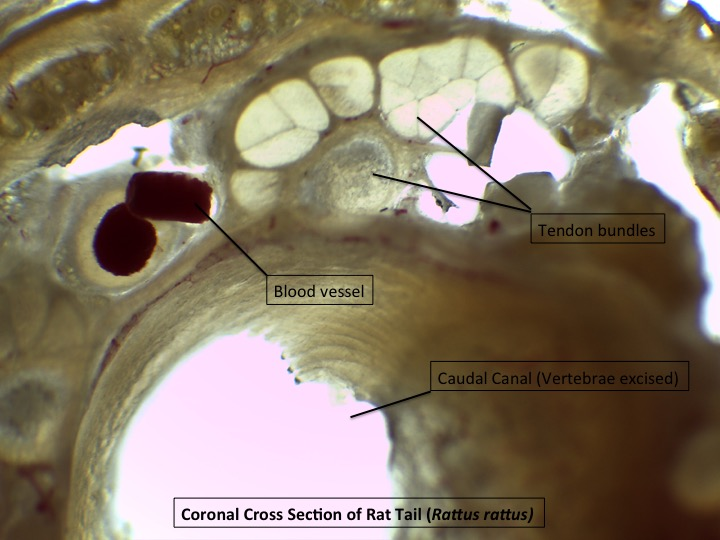
Microscopic cross section of Rattus rattus tail, delineating tendon bundles, vasculature, and vertebral canal

Multiple studies have explored the thermoregulatory capacity of rodent tails by subjecting test organisms to varying levels of physical activity and quantifying heat conduction via the animals' tails. One study demonstrated a significant disparity in heat dissipation from a rat's tail relative to its abdomen. This observation was attributed to the higher proportion of vascularity in the tail, as well as its higher surface-area-to-volume ratio, which directly relates to heat's ability to dissipate via the skin. These findings were confirmed in a separate study analyzing the relationships of heat storage and mechanical efficiency in rodents that exercise in warm environments. In this study, the tail was a focal point in measuring heat accumulation and modulation.

On the other hand, the tail's ability to function as a proprioceptive sensor and modulator has also been investigated. As aforementioned, the tail demonstrates a high degree of muscularization and subsequent innervation that ostensibly collaborate in orienting the organism. Specifically, this is accomplished by coordinated flexion and extension of tail muscles to produce slight shifts in the organism's center of mass, orientation, etc., which ultimately assists it with achieving a state of proprioceptive balance in its environment. Further mechanobiological investigations of the constituent tendons in the tail of the rat have identified multiple factors that influence how the organism navigates its environment with this structure. A particular example is that of a study in which the morphology of these tendons is explicated in detail. Namely, cell viability tests of tendons of the rat's tail demonstrate a higher proportion of living fibroblasts that produce the collagen for these fibers. As in humans, these tendons contain a high density of golgi tendon organs that help the animal assess stretching of muscle in situ and adjust accordingly by relaying the information to higher cortical areas associated with balance, proprioception, and movement.

The characteristic tail of murids also displays a unique defense mechanism known as degloving in which the outer layer of the integument can be detached in order to facilitate the animal's escape from a predator. This evolutionary selective pressure has persisted despite a multitude of pathologies that can manifest upon shedding part of the tail and exposing more interior elements to the environment. Paramount among these are bacterial and viral infection, as the high density of vascular tissue within the tail becomes exposed upon avulsion or similar injury to the structure. The degloving response is a nocifensive response, meaning that it occurs when the animal is subjected to acute pain, such as when a predator snatches the organism by the tail.

== Domesticated rats ==
Domestic rats do not pose any more of a risk of zoonotic diseases than pets such as cats or dogs.

Domestic rats differ from wild rats in many ways. Domestic rats' behavior depending on how many generations they have been kept as pets; for example, wild rats are more active and reactive than domestic rats. Domestic rats are calmer and less likely to bite; they can tolerate greater crowding; they breed earlier and produce more offspring; and their brains, livers, kidneys, adrenal glands, and hearts are smaller.

Rats are intelligent and can be taught to perform selected behaviors. Rats are also known to be very clean, show empathy, and "giggle" when tickled. Early studies found evidence both for and against measurable intelligence using the "g factor" in rats. Part of the difficulty of understanding animal cognition, generally, is determining what to measure. One aspect of intelligence is the ability to learn, which can be measured using a maze like the T-maze. Experiments done in the 1920s showed that some rats performed better than others in maze tests, and if these rats were selectively bred, their offspring also performed better, suggesting that in rats an ability to learn was heritable in some way.

=== Rats as pets ===
Domesticated rats, selectively bred for specific traits, have been kept as pets since at least the late 19th century. Pet rats are most commonly domesticated variants of the brown rat (Rattus norvegicus), though other species, such as the black rat (Rattus rattus) and the giant pouched rat (Cricetomys spp.), are also occasionally kept.

Selective breeding has brought about different color and marking varieties in rats. Genetic mutations have also created different fur types, such as rex and hairless. Congenital malformation in selective breeding have created the dumbo rat, a popular pet choice due to their low, saucer-shaped ears. A breeding standard exists for rat fanciers wishing to breed and show their rat at a rat show.

=== Rats as scientific subjects and working animals ===
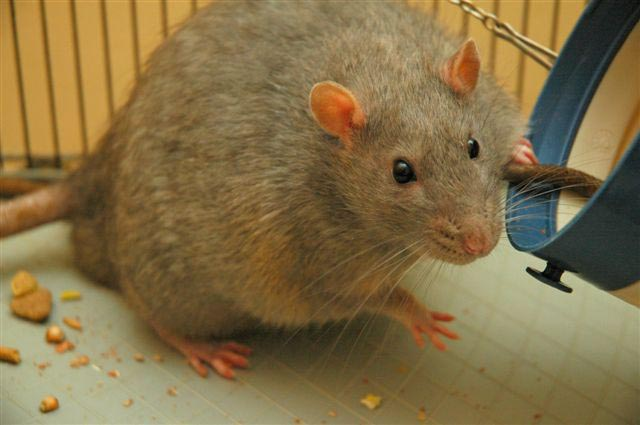
A laboratory rat strain, known as a Zucker rat, bred to be genetically prone to diabetes, a metabolic disorder also found among humans

Brown rats are often used as model organisms for scientific research. Since the publication of the rat genome sequence, and other advances, such as the creation of a rat SNP chip, and the production of knockout rats, the laboratory rat has become a useful genetic tool, although not as popular as mice. Entirely new breeds or "lines" of brown rats, such as the Wistar rat, have been bred for use in laboratories. Much of the genome of Rattus norvegicus has been sequenced. When it comes to conducting tests related to intelligence, learning, and drug abuse, rats are a popular choice due to their high intelligence, ingenuity, aggressiveness, and adaptability. Their psychology seems in many ways similar to that of humans. Inspired by B. F. Skinner's famous box which dispensed food pellets when rats pushed a lever, photographer Augustin Lignier gave two rats periodic, unpredictable rewards for pressing a button. He likened their repeated button-pressing behaviors to people's fascinations with digital and social media.

Rats have also been used as working animals. Tasks for working rats include the sniffing of gunpowder residue, demining, acting and animal-assisted therapy. Rats have a keen sense of smell and are easy to train. These characteristics have been employed, for example, by the Belgian non-governmental organization APOPO, which trains rats (specifically African giant pouched rats) to detect landmines and diagnose tuberculosis through smell.

== Wild rats ==
=== Rats as food ===
Rat meat is a food that, while taboo in some cultures, is a dietary staple in others.

=== Rats as pests ===
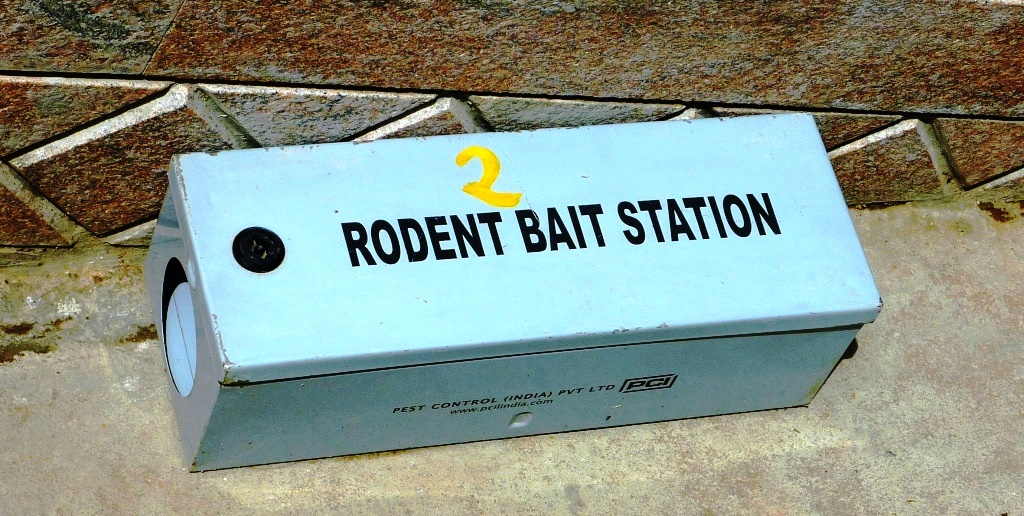
Rodent Bait Station, Chennai, India

Rats have long been considered deadly pests. Once considered a modern myth, the rat flood in India occurs every 50 years, as armies of bamboo rats descend upon rural areas and devour everything in their path. Rats have long been held up as the chief villain in the spread of the Bubonic Plague; however, recent studies show that rats alone could not account for the rapid spread of the disease through Europe in the Middle Ages. Still, the Centers for Disease Control and Prevention does list nearly a dozen diseases directly linked to rats.

Most urban areas battle rat infestations. A 2015 study by the American Housing Survey (AHS) found that 18% of homes in Philadelphia showed evidence of rodents. Boston, New York City, and Washington, D.C., also demonstrated significant rodent infestations. Indeed, rats in New York City are famous for their size and prevalence. The urban legend that the rat population in Manhattan equals that of its human population was definitively refuted by Robert Sullivan in his book Rats but illustrates New Yorkers' awareness of the presence, and on occasion boldness and cleverness, of the rodents. New York has specific regulations for eradicating rats; multifamily residences and commercial businesses must use a specially trained and licensed rat-catcher.

Chicago was declared the "rattiest city" in the U.S. by the pest control company Orkin in 2020, for the sixth consecutive time. It is followed by Los Angeles, New York, Washington, D.C., and San Francisco. To help combat the problem, a Chicago animal shelter has placed more than 1000 feral cats (sterilized and vaccinated) outside of homes and businesses since 2012, where they hunt and catch rats while also providing a deterrent simply by their presence.

Rats have the ability to swim up sewer pipes into toilets. Rats will infest any area that provides shelter and easy access to sources of food and water, including under sinks, near garbage, and inside walls or cabinets.

==== Role in the spread of disease ====
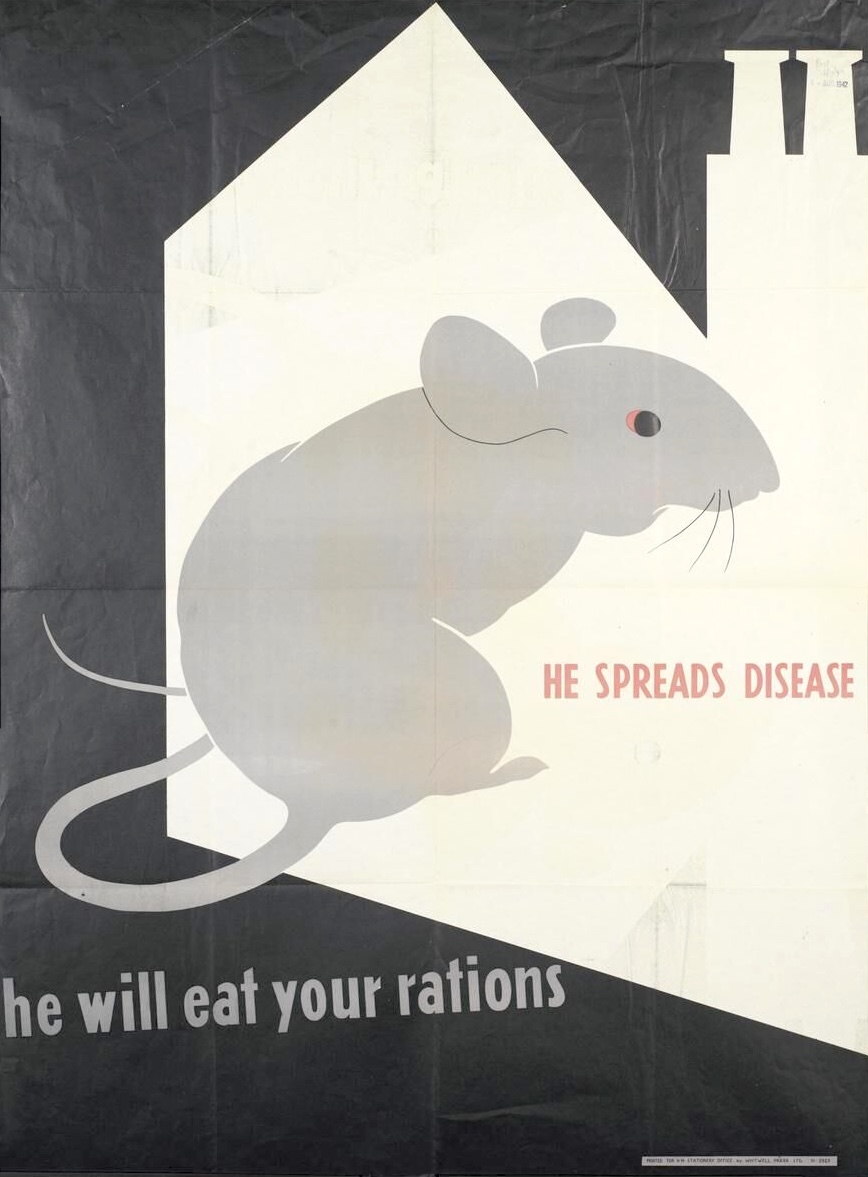
World War II-era poster warning about rats as a disease vector and pest

Rats can serve as zoonotic vectors for certain pathogens and thus spread disease, such as bubonic plague, Lassa fever, leptospirosis, and hantavirus infection. Researchers studying New York City wastewater have also cited rats as the potential source of "cryptic" SARS-CoV-2 lineages, due to unknown viral RNA fragments in sewage matching mutations previously shown to make SARS-CoV-2 more adept at rodent-based transmission.

Rats are also associated with human dermatitis because they are frequently infested with blood feeding rodent mites such as the tropical rat mite (Ornithonyssus bacoti) and spiny rat mite (Laelaps echidnina), which will opportunistically bite and feed on humans, where the condition is known as rat mite dermatitis.

=== Rats as invasive species ===
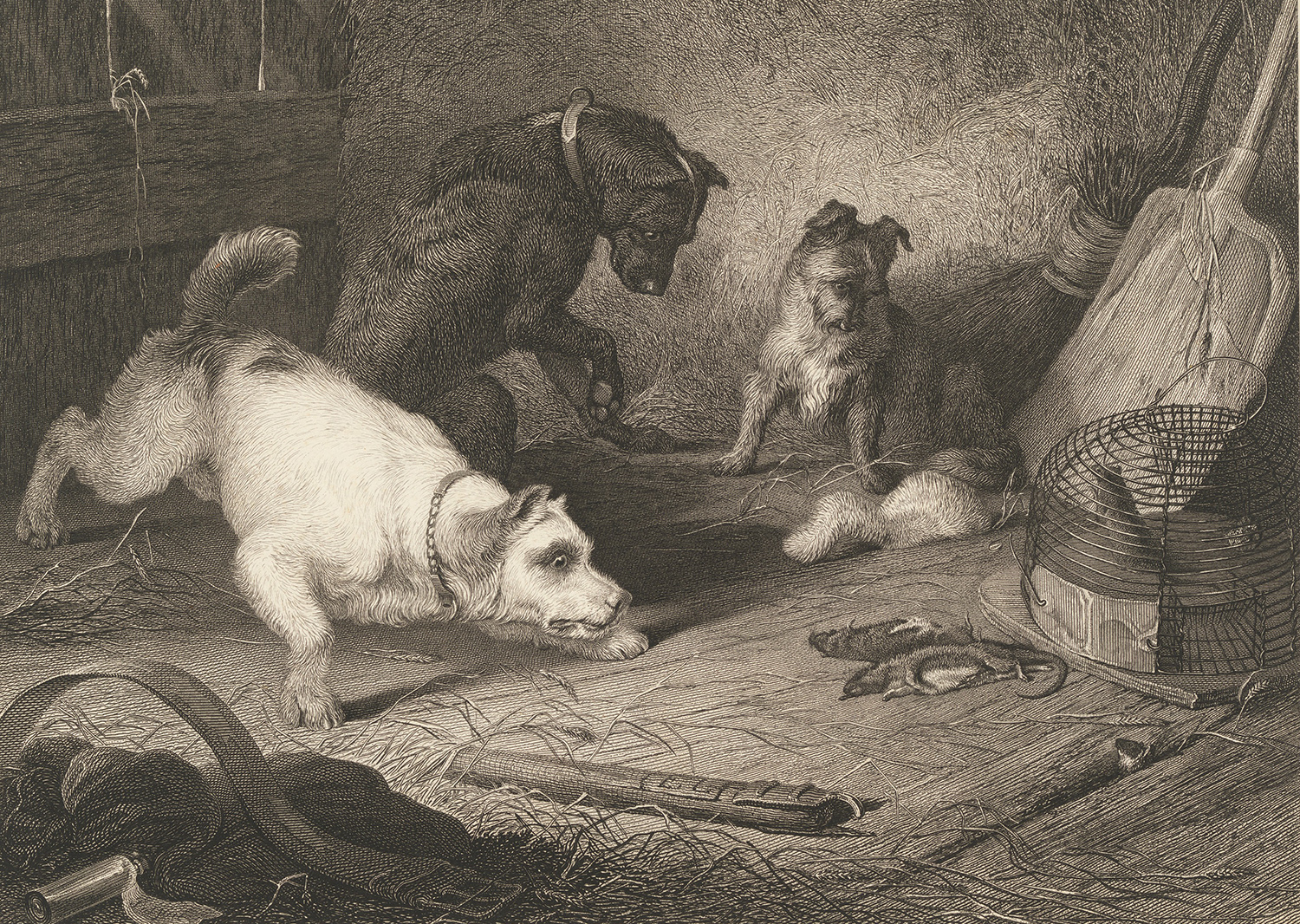
Rat-catching, 1823, by Edwin Landseer, engraving, published by Hurst, Robinson & Co.

When introduced into locations where rats previously did not exist, they can cause significant environmental degradation. Rattus rattus, the black rat, is considered to be one of the world's worst invasive species. Also known as the ship rat, it has been carried worldwide as a stowaway on seagoing vessels for millennia and has usually accompanied men to any new area visited or settled by human beings by sea. Rats first got to countries such as America and Australia by stowing away on ships. The similar species Rattus norvegicus, the brown rat or wharf rat, has also been carried worldwide by ships in recent centuries.

The ship or wharf rat has contributed to the extinction of many species of wildlife, including birds, small mammals, reptiles, invertebrates, and plants, especially on islands. True rats are omnivorous, capable of eating a wide range of plant and animal foods, and have a very high birth rate. When introduced to a new area, they quickly reproduce to take advantage of the new food supply. In particular, they prey on the eggs and young of forest birds, which on isolated islands often have no other predators and thus have no fear of predators. Some experts believe that rats are to blame for between forty percent and sixty percent of all seabird and reptile extinctions, with ninety percent of those occurring on islands. Thus man has indirectly caused the extinction of many species by accidentally introducing rats to new areas.

=== Rat-free areas ===
Rat trapped in a cage

Rats are found in nearly all areas of Earth which are inhabited by human beings. The only rat-free continent is Antarctica, which is too cold for rat survival outdoors, and its lack of human habitation does not provide buildings to shelter them from the weather. However, rats have been introduced to many of the islands near Antarctica, and because of their destructive effect on native flora and fauna, efforts to eradicate them are ongoing. In particular, Bird Island (just off the previously rat-infested South Georgia Island), where breeding seabirds could be badly affected if rats were introduced, is subject to special measures and regularly monitored for rat invasions.

In January 2015, an international "Rat Team" (organized by the South Georgia Heritage Trust) set sail from the Falkland Islands for the British Overseas Territory of South Georgia and the South Sandwich Islands on board a ship carrying three helicopters and 100 tons of rat poison with the objective of "reclaiming the island for its seabirds". Rats had wiped out more than 90% of the seabirds on South Georgia, and the sponsors hoped that once the rats were gone, it would regain its former status as home to the greatest concentration of seabirds in the world.

As part of island restoration, some islands' rat populations have been eradicated to protect or restore the ecology. Hawadax Island, Alaska was declared rat free after 229 years and Campbell Island, New Zealand after almost 200 years. Breaksea Island in New Zealand was declared rat free in 1988 after an eradication campaign based on a successful trial on the smaller Hawea Island nearby.

After an eradication programme, Lundy in England was declared free of brown and black rats in 2006, allowing a subsequent recovery of the island's seabirds. In 2008, the Scottish island of Canna was declared free of its 10,000 rat population after a three-year programme of baiting and trapping.

The Canadian province of Alberta is notable for being the largest inhabited area on Earth which is free of true rats due to very aggressive government rat control policies. It has large numbers of native pack rats, also called bushy-tailed wood rats, but they are forest-dwelling vegetarians which are much less destructive than true rats.

Alberta was settled by Europeans relatively late in North American history and only became a province in 1905. Black rats cannot survive in its climate at all, and brown rats must live near people and in their structures to survive the winters. There are numerous predators in Canada's vast natural areas which will eat non-native rats, so it took until 1950 for invading rats to make their way over land from Eastern Canada. Immediately upon their arrival at the eastern border with Saskatchewan, the Alberta government implemented an extremely aggressive rat control program to stop them from advancing further. A systematic detection and eradication system was used throughout a control zone about 600 kilometres (400 mi) long and 30 kilometres (20 mi) wide along the eastern border to eliminate rat infestations before the rats could spread further into the province. Shotguns, bulldozers, high explosives, poison gas, and incendiaries were used to destroy rats. Numerous farm buildings were destroyed in the process. Initially, tons of arsenic trioxide were spread around thousands of farm yards to poison rats, but soon after the program commenced the rodenticide and medical drug warfarin was introduced, which is much safer for people and more effective at killing rats than arsenic.

Forceful government control measures, strong public support and enthusiastic citizen participation continue to keep rat infestations to a minimum. The effectiveness has been aided by a similar but newer program in Saskatchewan which prevents rats from even reaching the Alberta border. Alberta still employs an armed rat patrol to control rats along Alberta's borders. About ten single rats are found and killed per year, and occasionally a large localized infestation has to be dug out with heavy machinery, but the number of permanent rat infestations is zero.

== In culture ==
Ancient Romans did not generally differentiate between rats and mice, instead referring to the former as mus maximus (big mouse) and the latter as mus minimus (little mouse).

On the Isle of Man, there is a taboo against the word "rat".

=== Asian cultures ===
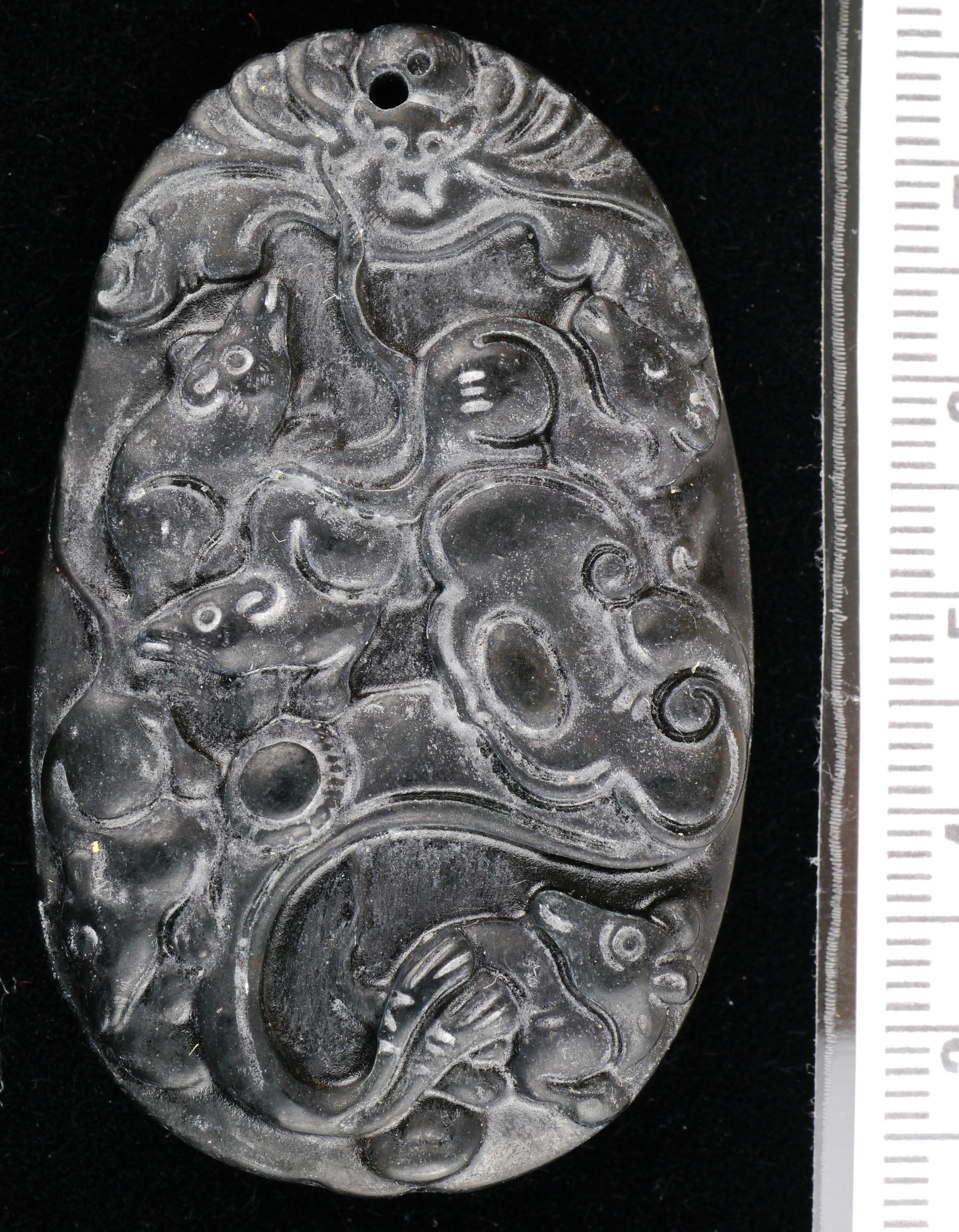
Chinese zodiac pendant with five rats climbing ruyi, bat at top of pendant

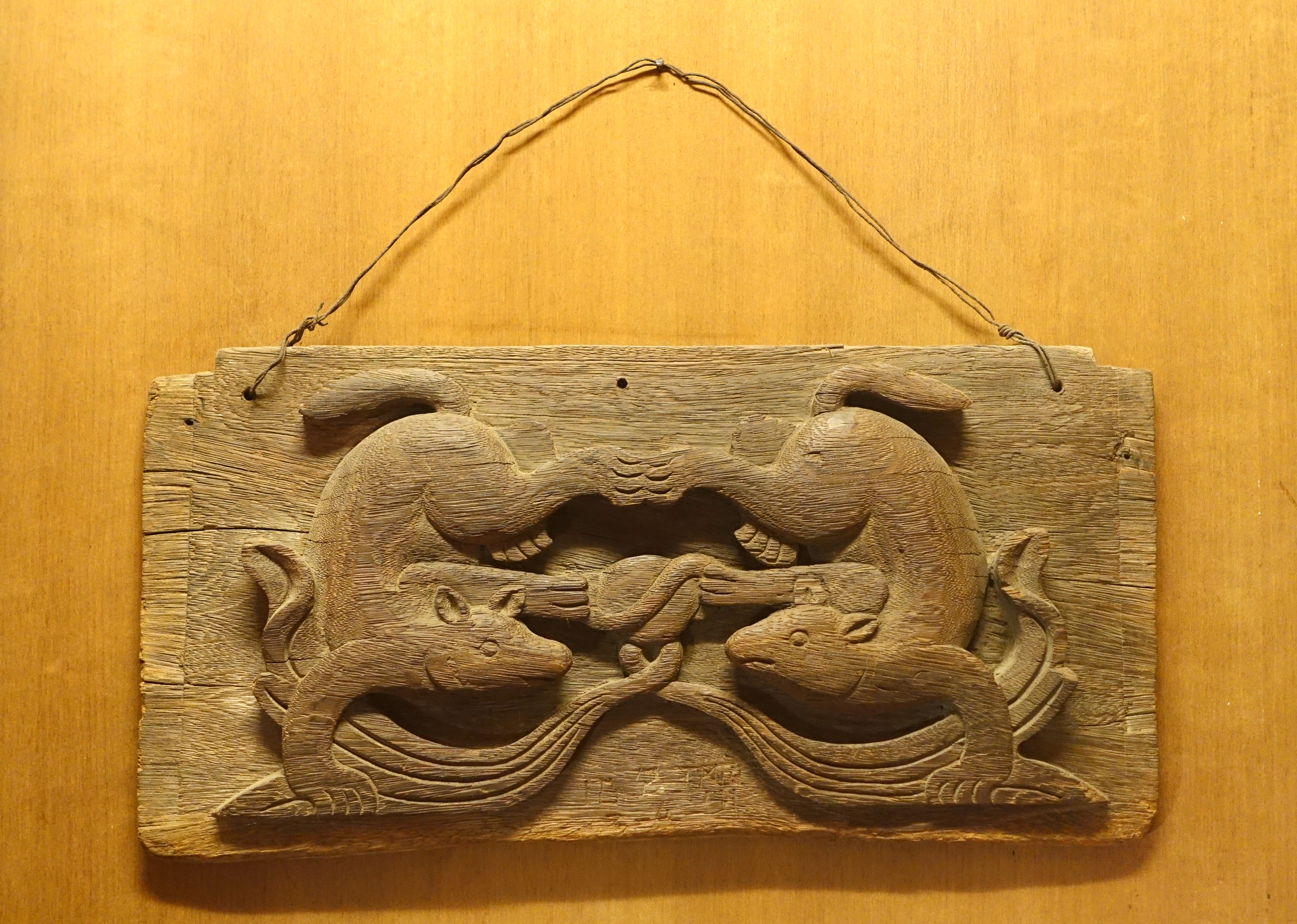
Two mice, Vietnam Museum of Ethnology - Hanoi

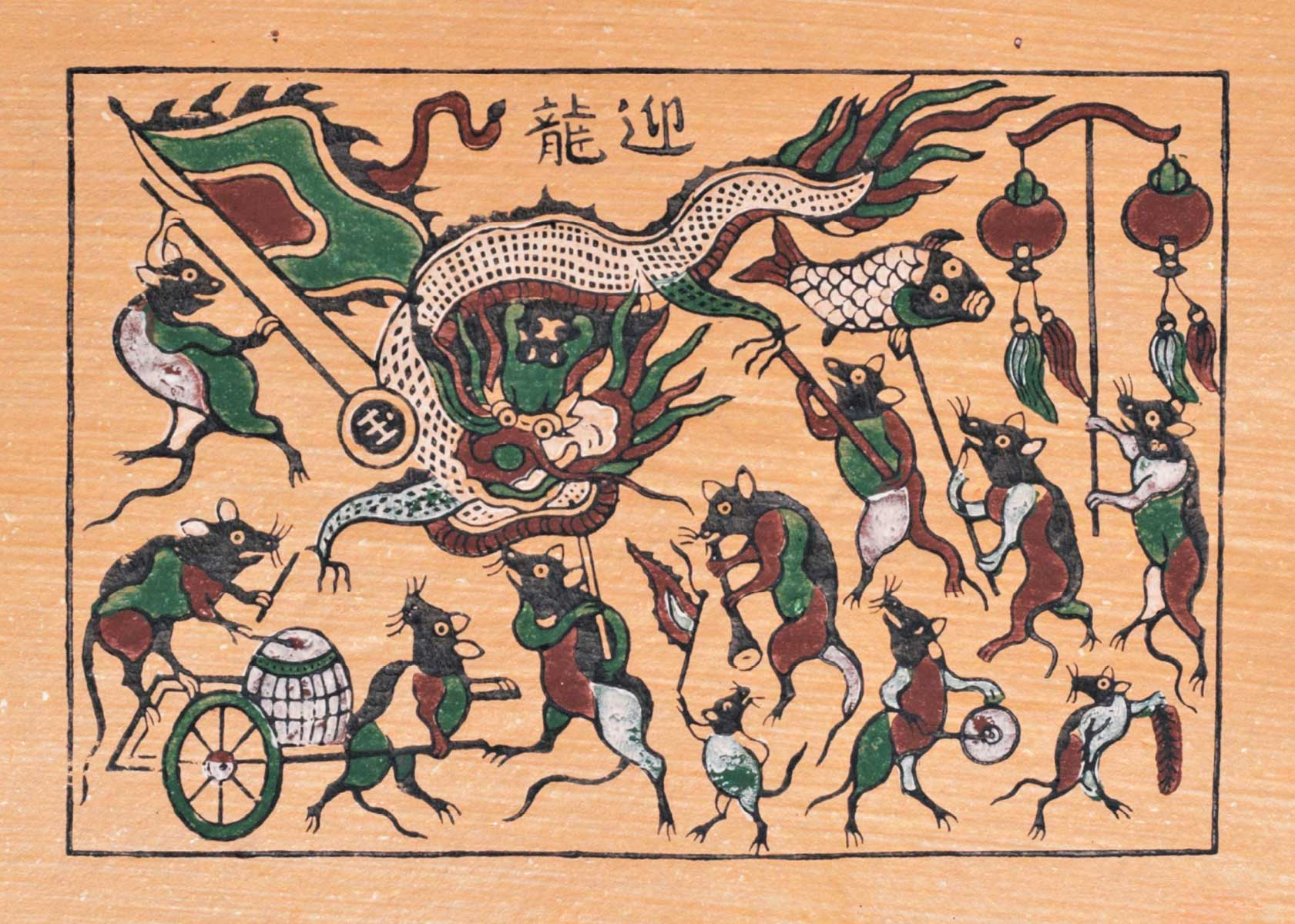
Chuột rước đèn (The mouse carries the lamp), Vietnamese Đông Hồ painting

The rat (sometimes referred to as a mouse) is the first of the twelve animals of the Chinese zodiac. People born in this year are expected to possess qualities associated with rats, including creativity, intelligence, honesty, generosity, ambition, a quick temper and wastefulness. People born in a year of the rat are said to get along well with "monkeys" and "dragons", and to get along poorly with "horses."

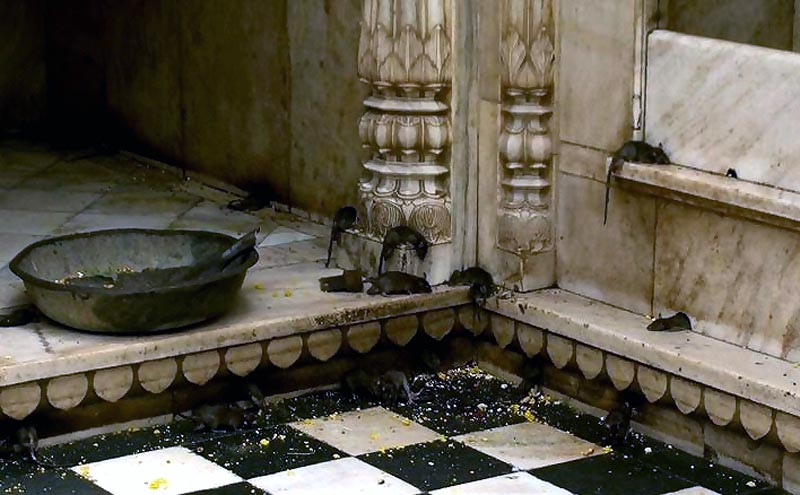
Indigenous rats are allowed to run freely throughout the Karni Mata Temple.

In Indian tradition, rats are seen as the vehicle of Ganesha, and a rat's statue is always found in a temple of Ganesh. In the northwestern Indian city of Deshnoke, the rats at the Karni Mata Temple are held to be destined for reincarnation as Sadhus (Hindu holy men). The attending priests feed milk and grain to the rats, of which the pilgrims also partake.

=== European cultures ===
European associations with the rat are generally negative. For instance, "Rats!" is used as a substitute for various vulgar interjections in the English language. These associations do not draw, per se, from any biological or behavioral trait of the rat, but possibly from the association of rats (and fleas) with the 14th-century medieval plague called the Black Death. Rats are seen as vicious, unclean, parasitic animals that steal food and spread disease. In 1522, the rats in Autun, France were charged and put on trial for destroying crops. However, some people in European cultures keep rats as pets and conversely find them to be tame, clean, intelligent, and playful.

Rats are often used in scientific experiments; animal rights activists allege the treatment of rats in this context is cruel. The term "lab rat" is used, typically in a self-effacing manner, to describe a person whose job function requires them to spend a majority of their work time engaged in bench-level research (such as postgraduate students in the sciences).

==== Terminology ====
Rats are frequently blamed for damaging food supplies and other goods, or spreading disease. Their reputation has carried into common parlance: in the English language, "rat" is often an insult or is generally used to signify an unscrupulous character; it is also used, as a synonym for the term nark, to mean an individual who works as a police informant or who has turned state's evidence. Writer/director Preston Sturges created the humorous alias "Ratskywatsky" for a soldier who seduced, impregnated, and abandoned the heroine of his 1944 film, The Miracle of Morgan's Creek. It is a term (noun and verb) in criminal slang for an informant – "to rat on someone" is to betray them by informing the authorities of a crime or misdeed they committed. Describing a person as "rat-like" usually implies he or she is unattractive and suspicious.

Among trade unions, the word "rat" is also a term for nonunion employers or breakers of union contracts, and this is why unions use inflatable rats.

=== Fiction ===
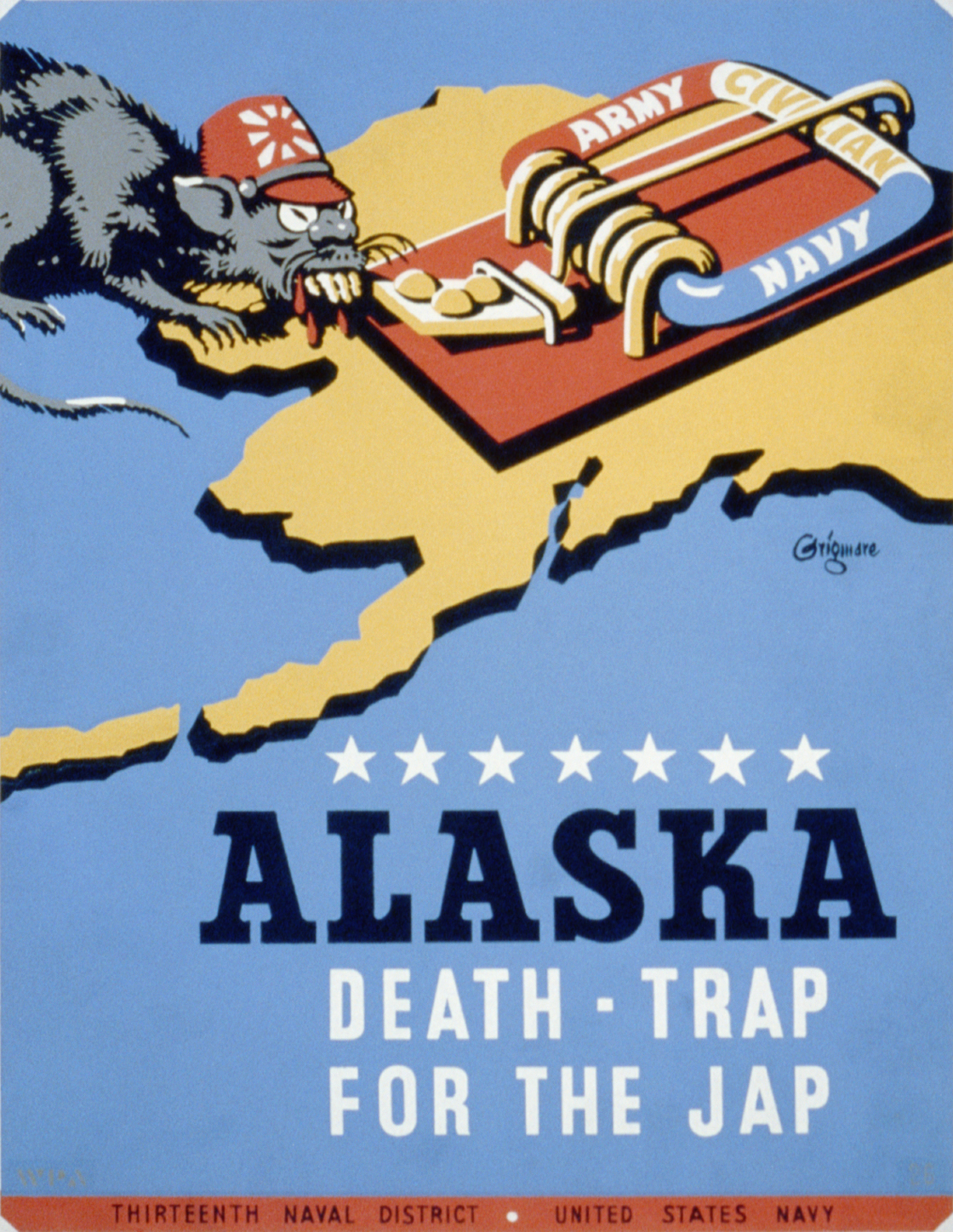
Imperial Japan depicted as a rat in a World War II United States Navy propaganda poster

Depictions of rats in fiction are historically inaccurate and negative. The most common falsehood is the squeaking almost always heard in otherwise realistic portrayals (i.e. nonanthropomorphic). While the recordings may be of actual squeaking rats, the noise is uncommon – they may do so only if distressed, hurt, or annoyed. Normal vocalizations are very high-pitched, well outside the range of human hearing. Rats are also often cast in vicious and aggressive roles when in fact, their shyness helps keep them undiscovered for so long in an infested home.

The actual portrayals of rats vary from negative to positive with a majority in the negative and ambiguous. The rat plays a villain in several mouse societies; from Brian Jacques's Redwall and Robin Jarvis's The Deptford Mice, to the roles of Disney's Professor Ratigan and Kate DiCamillo's Roscuro and Botticelli. They have often been used as a mechanism in horror; being the titular evil in stories like James Herbert's The Rats or H.P. Lovecraft's "The Rats in the Walls", in films like Willard and Ben, or both Stephen King's "Graveyard Shift" and its film adaptation. Another terrifying use of rats is as a method of torture, for instance in Room 101 in George Orwell's Nineteen Eighty-Four or The Pit and the Pendulum by Edgar Allan Poe.

Selfish helpfulness—those willing to help for a price—has also been attributed to fictional rats. Templeton, from E. B. White's Charlotte's Web, repeatedly reminds the other characters that he is only involved because it means more food for him, and the cellar-rat of John Masefield's The Midnight Folk requires bribery to be of any assistance.

By contrast, the rats appearing in the Doctor Dolittle books tend to be highly positive and likeable characters, many of whom tell their remarkable life stories in the Mouse and Rat Club established by the animal-loving doctor. In The Underland Chronicles series, rats are both allies (such as Ripred) and enemies (such as Bane, and King Gorger).

Some fictional works use rats as the main characters. Notable examples include the society created by O'Brien's Mrs. Frisby and the Rats of NIMH, and others include Doctor Rat, and Rizzo the Rat from The Muppets. Pixar's 2007 animated film Ratatouille is about a rat described by Roger Ebert as "earnest... lovable, determined, [and] gifted" who lives with a Parisian garbage-boy-turned-chef.

Mon oncle d'Amérique ("My American Uncle"), a 1980 French film, illustrates Henri Laborit's theories on evolutionary psychology and human behaviors by using short sequences in the storyline showing lab rat experiments.

In Harry Turtledove's science fiction novel Homeward Bound, humans unintentionally introduce rats to the ecology at the home world of an alien race which previously invaded Earth and introduced some of its own fauna into its environment. A. Bertram Chandler pitted the space-bound protagonist of a long series of novels, Commodore Grimes, against giant, intelligent rats who took over several stellar systems and enslaved their human inhabitants. "The Stainless Steel Rat" is nickname of the (human) protagonist of a series of humorous science fiction novels written by Harry Harrison.

Wererats, therianthropic creatures able to take the shape of a rat, have appeared in the fantasy or horror genre since the 1970s. The term is a neologism coined in analogy to werewolf. The concept has since become common in role-playing games like Dungeons & Dragons and fantasy fiction like the Anita Blake series.

==== The Pied Piper ====
One of the oldest and most historic stories about rats is "The Pied Piper of Hamelin", in which a rat-catcher leads away an infestation with enchanted music. The piper is later refused payment, so he in turn leads away the town's children. This tale, traced to Germany around the late 13th century, has inspired adaptations in film, theatre, literature, and even opera. The subject of much research, some theories have intertwined the tale with events related to the Black Plague, in which black rats played an important role. Fictional works based on the tale that focus heavily on the rat aspect include Terry Pratchett's The Amazing Maurice and His Educated Rodents, and Belgian graphic novel Le Bal du Rat Mort (The Ball of the Dead Rat). Furthermore, a linguistic phenomenon when a wh-expression drags with it an entire encompassing phrase to the front of the clause has been named pied-piping after "Pied Piper of Hamlin".

== See also ==
- Chicago rat hole
- List of books and articles about rats
- List of fictional rodents
- Rat-baiting
- Rat guard
- Rat king
- Rodentology
