= List of books and articles about rats =

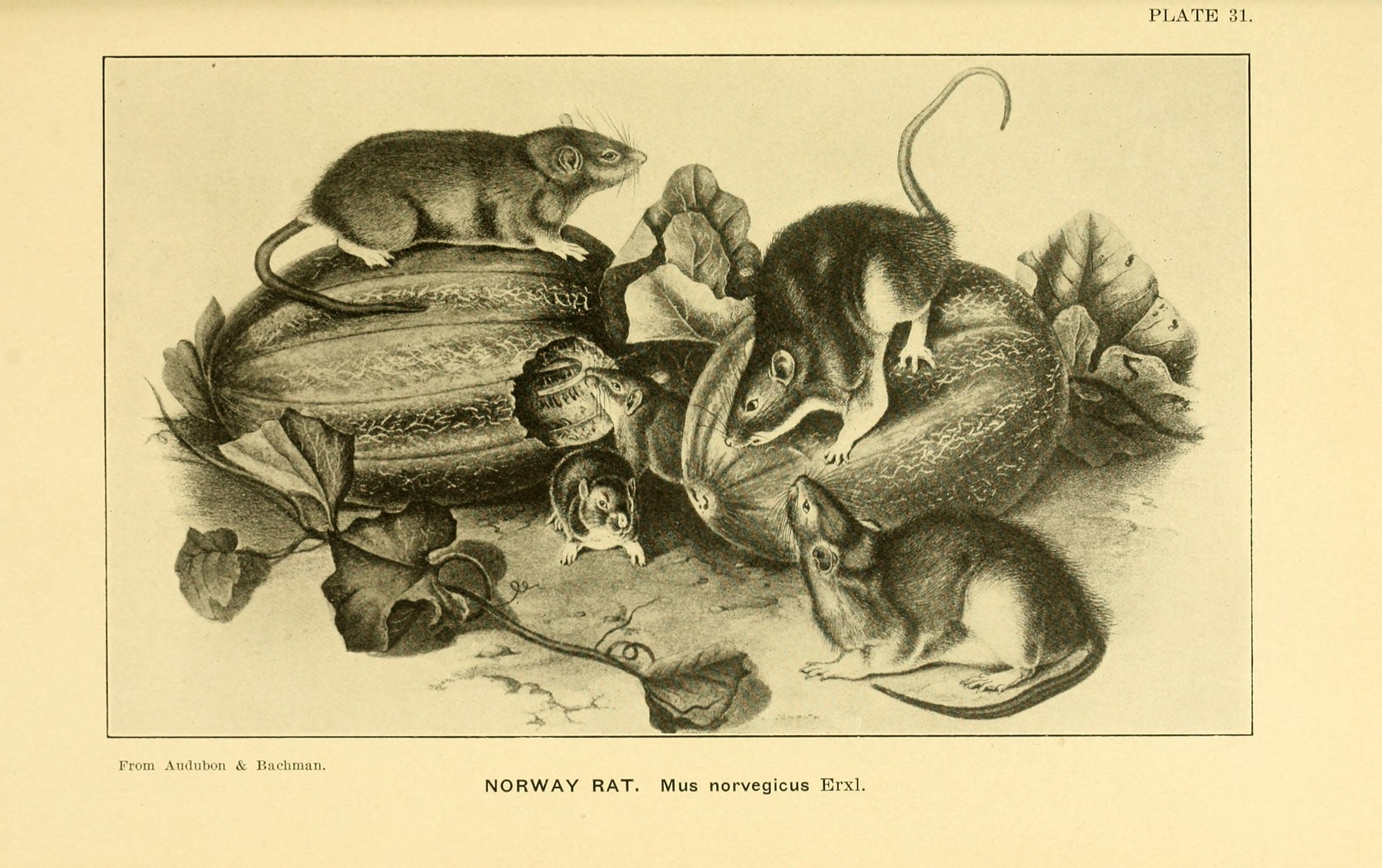
Norway Rat

This list of books and articles about rats is an English-only non-fiction bibliography using APA style citations.

== Books ==
- Barkley, H.C. (2019). Studies in the Art of Rat-catching. Reprint. Wentworth Press. ISBN 978-0469040304
- Barnett, A.S. (2002). The Story of Rats: Their Impact on Us, and Our Impact on Them. Allen & Unwin. ISBN 1-86508-519-7.
- Hendrickson, R. (1983). More Cunning than Man: A Complete History of the Rat and its Role in Civilization, Kensington Books. ISBN 1-57566-393-7.
- Hodgson, B. (1997). The Rat: A Perverse Miscellany. Ten Speed Press. ISBN 9780898159264
- Langton, J. (2007). Rat: How the World's Most Notorious Rodent Clawed Its Way to the Top. St Martins Press. ISBN 978-0312363840
- Lantz, D. E. (2019). The Brown Rat In The United States. Wentworth Press; Reprint. ISBN 978-1010623786
- Matthews, I. (1898). Full Revelations of a Professional Rat-Catcher, after 25 Years' Experience. 1st ed. Manchester: Friendly Societies Printing Co. ISBN 1-905124-64-3.
- McCumber, A. (2025). Bad Nature: How Rat Control Shapes Human and Nonhuman Worlds. University of Chicago Press. ISBN 9780226838984
- Plummer, D. (1979). Tales of a Rat-hunting Man. Robin Clark Ltd. ISBN 0-86072-025-X
- Rodwell, J. (1850). The rat! And its cruel cost to the nation, by uncle James. Ritnsll and Weir. Pulteney Street, London, England. Reprint. ISBN 978-1347118931
- Rodwell, J. (1858). The Rat: Its History & Destructive Character. Reprint. ISBN 978-1354531174
- Sullivan, R. (2004). Rats: A Year with New York's Most Unwanted Inhabitants. Granta Books, London. ISBN 9781847087881
- Sullivan, R. (2005). Rats: Observations on the History and Habitat of the City's Most Unwanted Inhabitants. Bloomsbury USA. ISBN 1-58234-477-9.
- Twigg, G. (1976). The Brown Rat. David & Charles; First Edition. ISBN 978-0715367827
- Zinsser, H. (1935). Rats, Lice and History. Blue Ribbon Books, Inc. ISBN 978-1412806725

== Articles ==
- Leung, LKP; Peter G. Cox; G. C. Jahn; Robert Nugent (2002). "Evaluating rodent management with Cambodian rice farmers". Cambodian Journal of Agriculture. 5: 21–26.
- Musser, G. G., and M. D. Carleton. (1993). "Family Muridae" in D. E. Wilson and D. M. Reeder (eds). Mammal Species of the World: a Taxonomic and Geographic Reference, Washington, D.C.:Smithsonian Institution Press, pp. 501–755.
- Pemberton, Neil (2014-12-01). "The Rat-Catcher's Prank: Interspecies Cunningness and Scavenging in Henry Mayhew's London". Journal of Victorian Culture. 19 (4): 520–535. doi:10.1080/13555502.2014.967548. ISSN 1355-5502.
- Schweinfurth, Manon K (2020). "The social life of Norway rats (Rattus norvegicus)". eLife. 9 e54020. doi:10.7554/eLife.54020. PMC 7145424.
