= Miniature Schnauzer =

German breed of dog

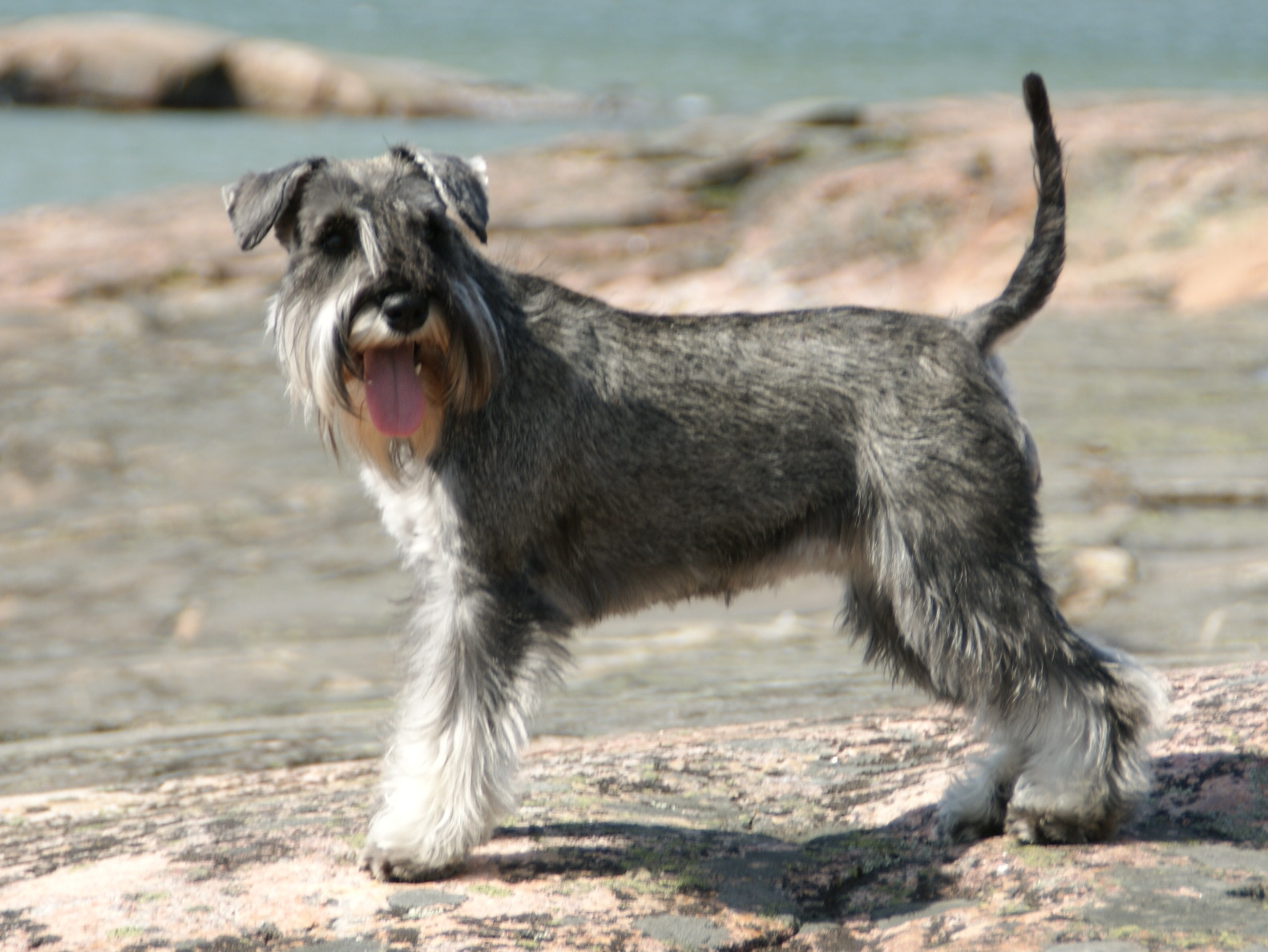
- Other names: Zwergschnauzer
- Origin: Germany
Traits
- Height: 30–35 cm (12–14 in)
- Weight: 4–8 kg (9–18 lb)
- Coat: dense, wiry and harsh, with dense undercoat
- Colour: solid black, with black undercoat; black-and-silver; salt-and-pepper; white with white undercoat
Kennel club standards
- Verband für das Deutsche Hundewesen: standard
- Fédération Cynologique Internationale: standard

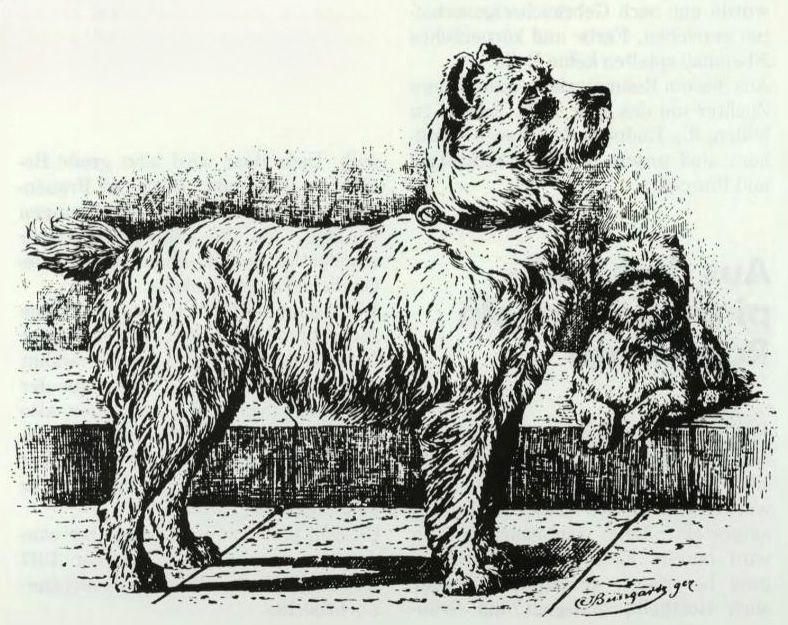
Jean Bungartz, Rauhhaariger Pinscher und Rauhhaariger Zwergpinscher, 1888

The Miniature Schnauzer is a German breed of small dog of Schnauzer type. It originated in Germany in the late nineteenth century. It may have been developed from the smallest specimens of the Standard Schnauzer, or crosses between the standard and one or more smaller breeds such as the Affenpinscher, Miniature Pinscher, and Poodles, as farmers bred a small dog that was an efficient ratting dog. They are described as "spunky" but aloof dogs, with good guarding tendencies without some guard dogs' predisposition to bite. Miniature Schnauzers are recognized in four colors internationally: solid black, black and silver, salt and pepper, and white.

It is the most popular Schnauzer breed, and remains one of the most popular worldwide, primarily for its temperament and relatively small size. As of 2022 it is the 17th most popular breed in the U.S.

== History ==
Neither the origin of the breed name, nor when it came into use, is known. The German word schnauze means 'snout', while both schnauz and schnauzbart mean 'walrus moustache'. The word schnauzer appears in the Bilder und Sagen aus der Schweiz of Jeremias Gotthelf, published in 1842. 'Schnauz' was a common name for a dog – several dogs with this name were shown in Elberfeld in 1880. At the third international dog show of the Verein zur Veredelung der Hunderassen in Hanover in 1879, a dog named 'Schnautzer' took first place in the Rauche Pinscher or Wire-haired Pinscher class.

The Schnauzers – Miniature, Standard and Giant – originated in southern Germany; they share a common history with the Miniature and German Pinscher. Dogs of this type – both rough-haired and smooth-haired, and of various sizes – were traditionally kept as carriage dogs or as stable dogs, and so were sometimes known as Stallpinscher; they were capable ratters. Dogs of both coat types were known as "Pinscher", and came from the same lineage; rough-haired and smooth-haired puppies could occur in the same litter. The rough-haired type, which would later become the Schnauzer, was also known as the Rattler or Rattenfänger.

In 1880 the Pinscher was recorded in the Deutschen Hundestammbuch, the stud-book of the Verein zur Veredelung der Hunderassen, and the first breed standard was drawn up. Various colours were described for the rough-haired type, including iron-grey, silver-grey, grey-yellow, corn-yellow and rust-yellow. An illustration by Jean Bungartz in Der Luxushund, published in 1888, shows both standard- and miniature-sized rough-haired Pinschers (Rauhhaariger Pinscher und Rauhhaariger Zwergpinscher). (Note: Raber dates it to 1884; Der Luxushund was published in 1888) In 1895 Ludwig Beckmann described five varieties of Pinscher – the rough- and smooth-haired Pinscher, the rough- and smooth-haired Miniature Pinscher, and the Affenpinscher. Also in 1895, a breed society, the Pinscherklub, was established for both types, both rough- and smooth-haired. Another society, the Schnauzerklub München, was formed in Munich in 1907 by breeders of the Mittelschnauzer. In 1917, with the sixth edition of the stud-book, the name of the rough-haired breed was officially changed from Rauhaarige Pinscher to Schnauzer. In 1918 the Pinscherklub and the Schnauzerklub München merged to form the Pinscher-Schnauzer-Verband, which in 1921 changed its name to the present Pinscher-Schnauzer-Klub 1895 e.V.

The Miniature Schnauzer was definitively accepted by the Fédération Cynologique Internationale in 1955. In the fifteen-year period from 2010 to 2024, annual registrations in Germany varied between 608 and 1151 – an annual average of 893 – for a total of 13397, or just under 12% of the total of approximately 1.13 million dogs registered in the fifteen-year period. In a census published by the Fédération Cynologique Internationale in 2013, the Miniature Schnauzer was listed tenth of the most-registered breeds world-wide, with 45263 of a total of 2276864 dogs; data was supplied by members of the federation and also by the kennel clubs of Australia, Canada, New Zealand, the United Kingdom and the United states.

A small number of Miniature Schnauzers were exported to the United States in 1924. In 1925 the Wire-Haired Pinscher Club of America was started, covering both Standard and Miniature Schnauzers; in 1933 it was divided into two separate clubs, one of them the American Miniature Schnauzer Club.

== Characteristics ==
It is a small dog: according to the international breed standard, height at the withers for both dogs and bitches varies from 30 to 35 cm, with body weights in the range 4 to 8 kg; weights most commonly fall in the range 4.5 to 7 kg. When seen from the side, the outline of the body is roughly square – the length of the body is close to – or equal to – the height at the withers.

They have a double coat, with wiry exterior fur and a soft undercoat. In show trim, the coat is kept short on the body, but the fur on the ears, legs, belly, and face is retained. Recognized coat colors are black, pepper and salt, black and silver, and pure white; pepper and salt coloration is where coat hairs have banded shades of black, gray and silver, fading to a gray or silver at the eyebrows, whiskers, underbody and legs.

Schnauzers are characterized by a rectangular head with bushy beard, mustache, and eyebrows; teeth that meet in a "scissor bite"; oval and dark colored eyes; and v-shaped, natural forward-folding ears (when cropped, the ears point straight upward and come to a sharp point). Their tails are naturally thin and short, and may be docked (where permitted). They will also have very straight, rigid front legs, and feet that are short and round (so-called "cat feet") with thick, black pads.

=== North American white coat controversy ===
White is one of four color varieties of the Miniature Schnauzer currently recognized by the Fédération Cynologique Internationale. However, they are not accepted for conformation showing by the American Kennel Club and Canadian Kennel Club. The controversy rests on the disputed origins of the white variation, namely whether it was contained within the genes of the originally recognized breed, or whether it was the result of subsequent modifications. Since the other two schnauzer types have never been available in a white variation, and the original German standard never included white as an acceptable color, the American Miniature Schnauzer Club chooses not to recognize white.

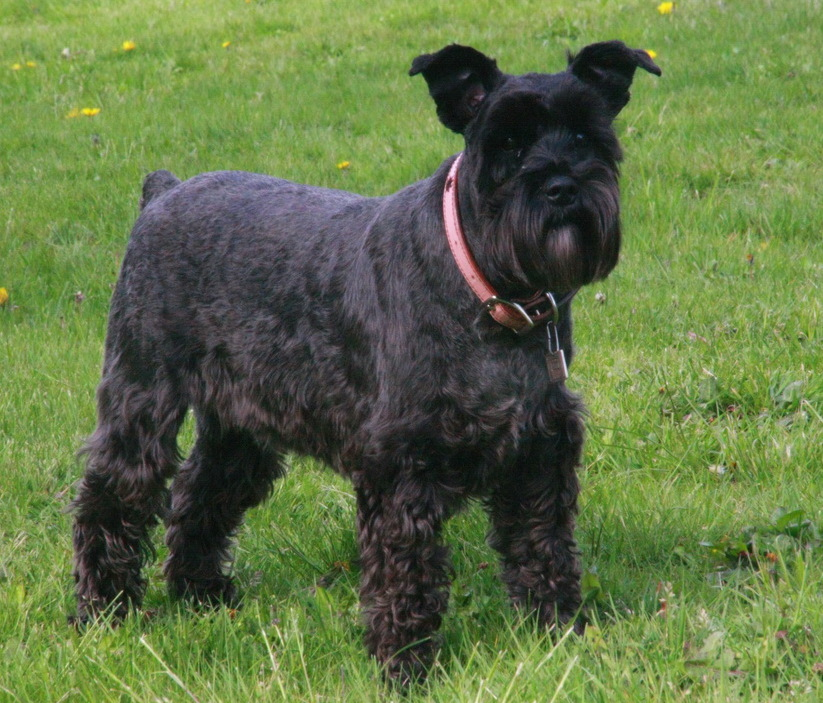
The black

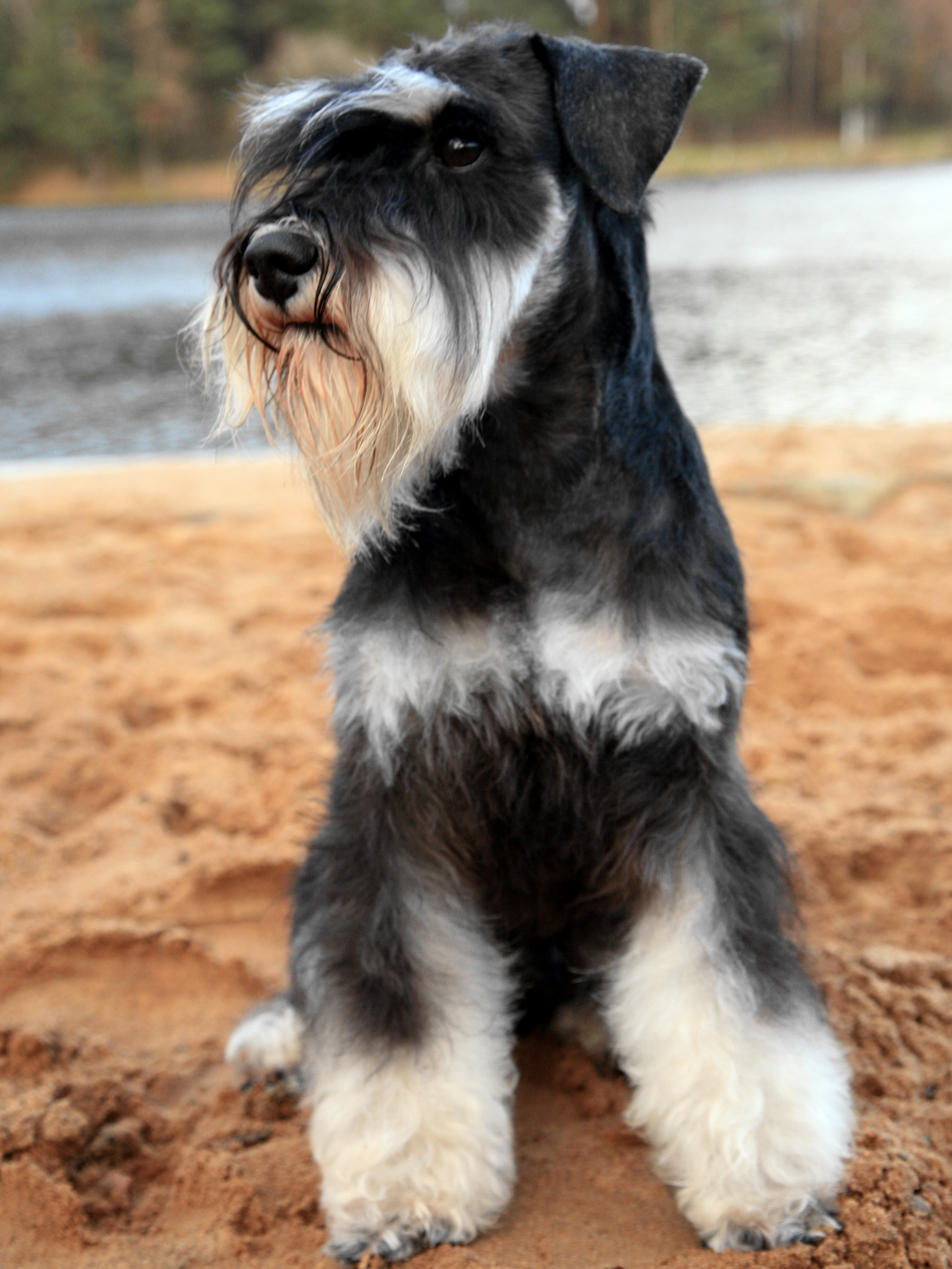
The black-and-silver

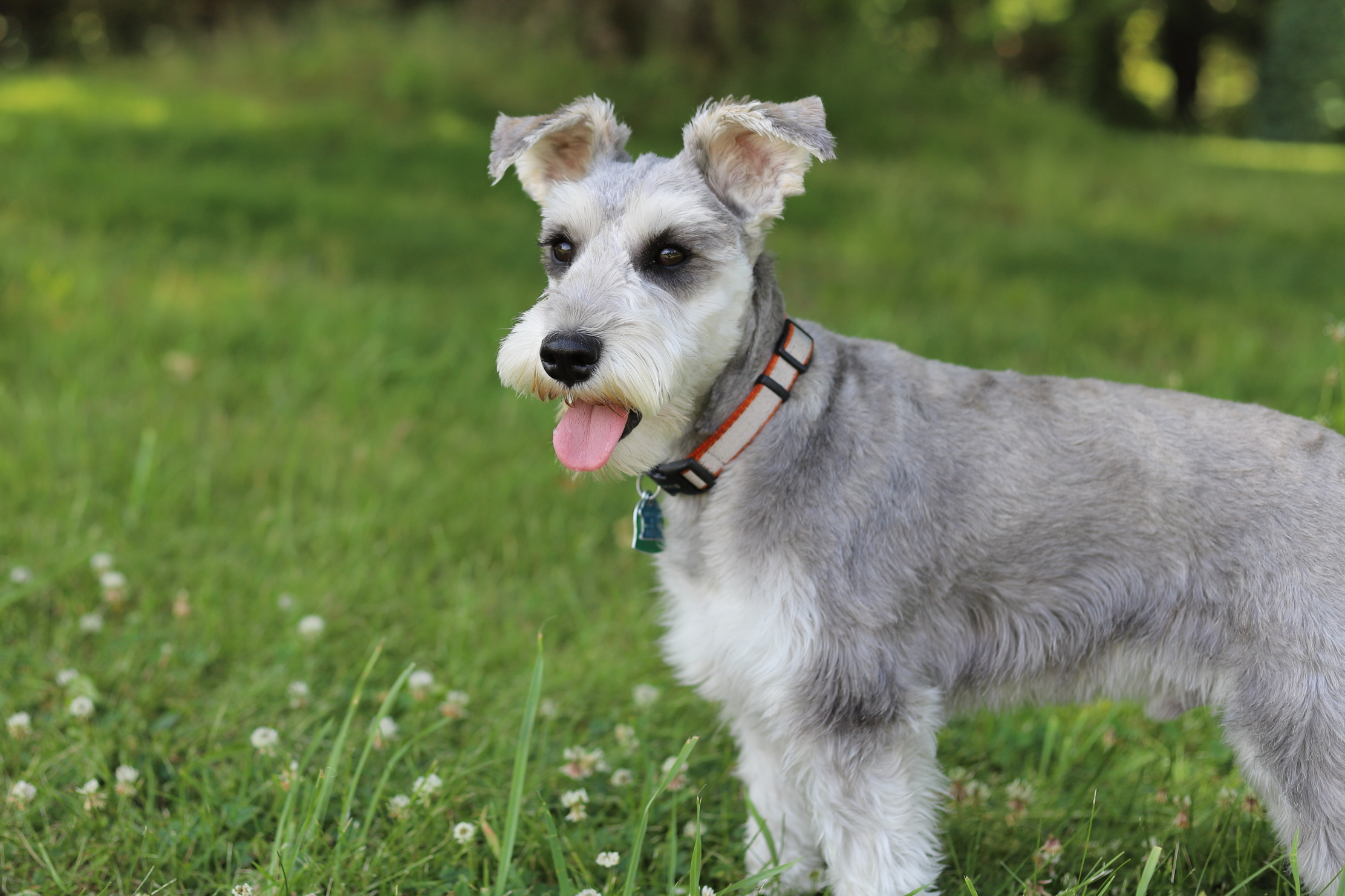
The salt and pepper

== Temperament ==
The American Kennel Club breed standard describes temperament as "alert and spirited, yet obedient to command ... friendly, intelligent and willing to please... never overaggressive or timid". Usually easy to train, they tend to be excellent watchdogs with a good territorial instinct, but more inclined toward barking than biting. They are often aloof with strangers until the owners of the home welcome the guest, upon which they are typically very friendly to them. While the Miniature Schnauzer is included in the Terrier Group in North America (due to rat-catching background), it does not have common ancestry with Terriers from Great Britain, and compared to them has a different personality, being more laid back, obedient, friendly, and less aggressive to other dogs.

Stanley Coren ranked the Miniature Schnauzer 12th out of 140 breeds in his book The Intelligence of Dogs (2006). Coren grouped the breed amongst "excellent working dogs". Additionally, experts contacted by Coren ranked the Miniature as fifth among top 15 breeds at watchdog barking ability.

== Health ==
A UK study found a life expectancy of 13.3 years for the breed, higher than the 12 year average for crossbreeds. A study in Japan for pet cemetery data found a life expectancy of 13.4 years, below the overall average of 13.7 years and the 15.3 year average for crossbreeds below 10 kg.

A Japanese study found a significant predisposition to gall bladder mucoceles for the Miniature Schnauzer with a 5.23 odds ratio.

A North American study found the breed to be predisposed to congenital portosystemic shunts, with 1% of Miniature Schnauzers having the condition compared to 0.05% for mixed-breed dogs.

Miniature Schnauzers are also prone to von Willebrand disease (vWD). vWD in dogs is an inherited bleeding disorder that occurs due to qualitative or quantitative deficiency of von Willebrand factor (vWF), a multimeric protein that is required for platelet adhesion.

The breed is predisposed to atopic dermatitis.

Schnauzer comedo syndrome is a type of follicular keratinisation defect found exclusively in the Miniature Schnauzer that is similar to nevus comedonicus in humans. The condition is characterised by small comedones developing on the dorsal spine (back) of the dog. The condition is believed to be caused by an inherited developmental defect in hair follicles, causing abnormal keratinisation and subsequently comedo formation, follicular plugging, and secondary bacterial folliculitis which leads to alopecia and crusting.
