= Giant Schnauzer =

German breed of dog

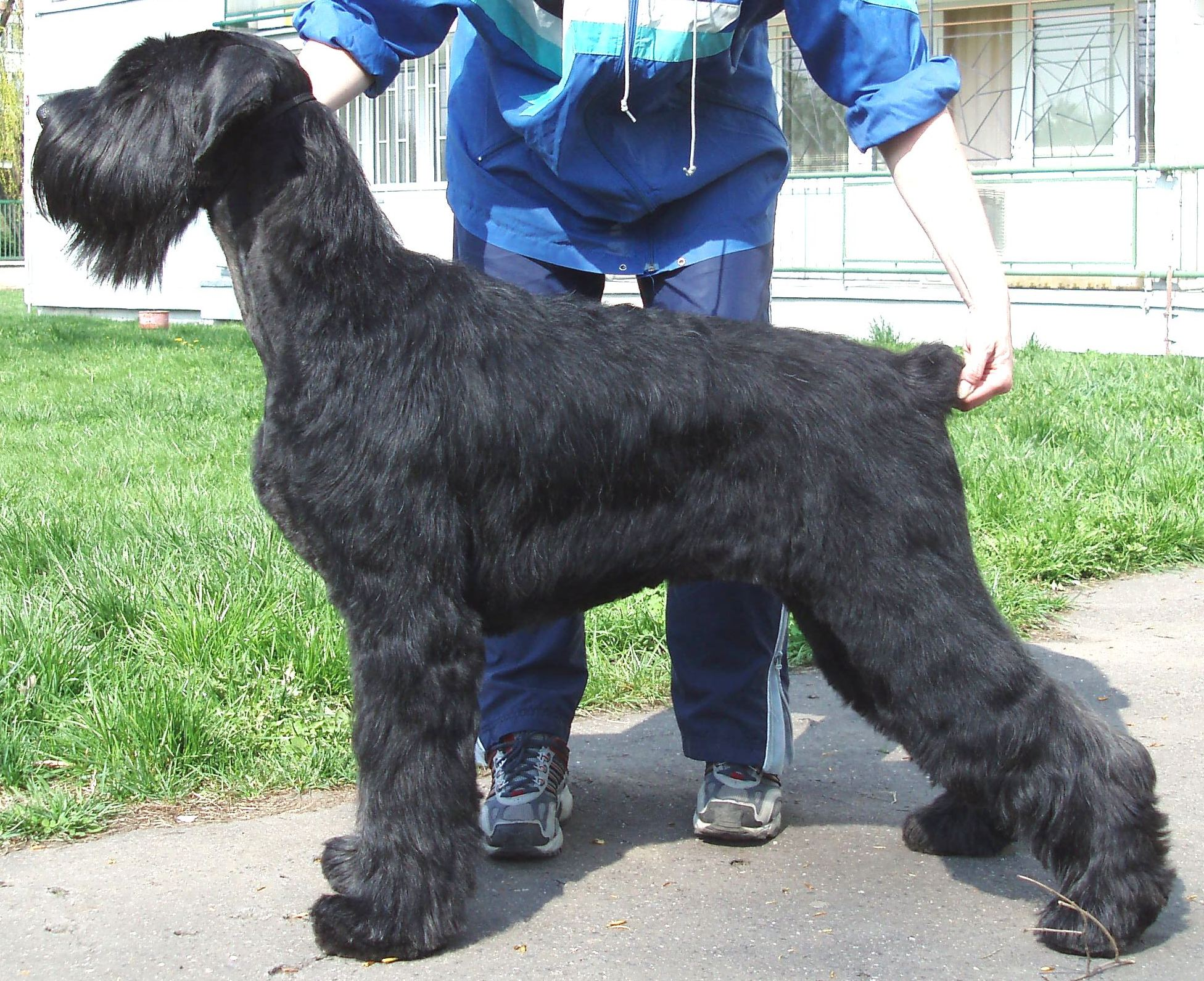
- Other names: Riesenschnauzer; Munich Schnauzer; Munchener; Russian Bear Schnauzer
- Origin: Germany
Traits
- Height: 60–70 cm (24–28 in)
- Weight: 35–47 kg (75–105 lb)
- Coat: dense and wiry
- Colour: pure black (with black undercoat); pepper-and-salt; black-silver
Kennel club standards
- Verband für das Deutsche Hundewesen: standard
- Fédération Cynologique Internationale: standard

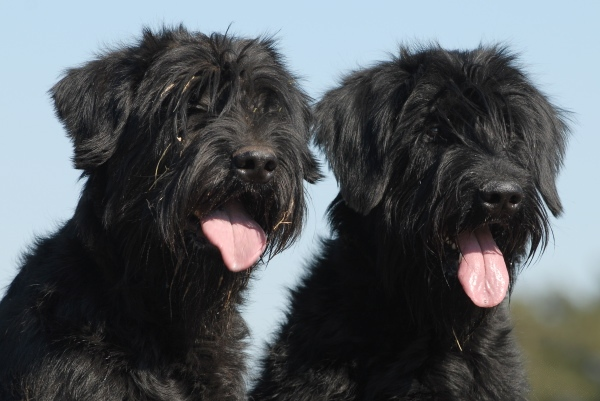

The Giant Schnauzer or Riesenschnauzer is a German breed of dog of Schnauzer type. It is larger than the other two Schnauzer breeds, the Standard Schnauzer and the Miniature Schnauzer. Originally bred to assist on farms by driving livestock to market and guarding the farmer's property, the breed eventually moved into the city, where it worked guarding breweries, butchers' shops, stockyards and factories. It was unknown outside Bavaria until it became popular as a military dog during World War I and World War II.

It has a dense coarse coat that protects it from the weather and from vermin. There are three color varieties: pepper and salt, pure black with black undercoat, and black and silver. Where legal, it is shown with cropped ears and docked tails. Like other schnauzers, it has a distinct beard and eyebrows. Today, the Giant Schnauzer participates in numerous dog sports, including Schutzhund. Another sport that the dog excels in is that of nosework. Due to its alert nature, the dog is also used in police work.

== History ==
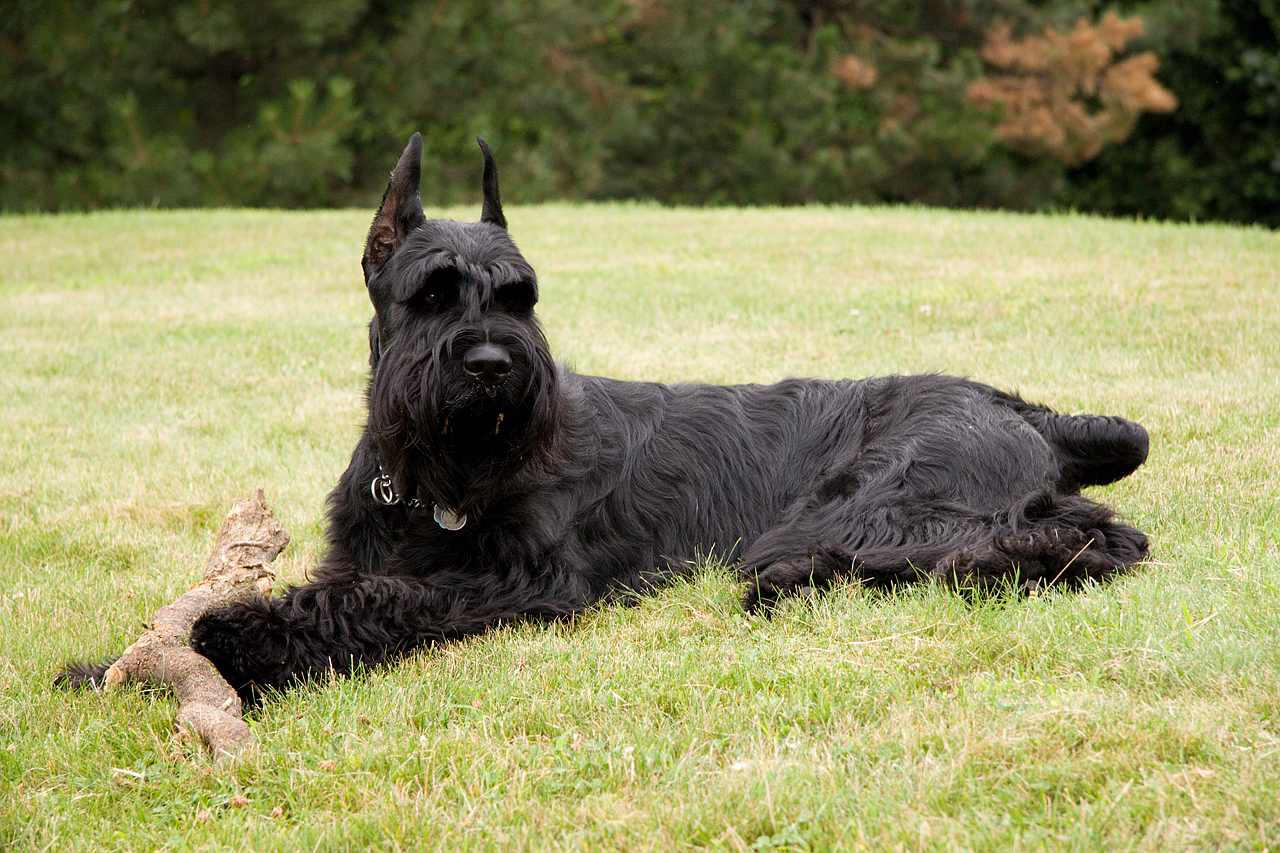

The origin of the breed name "Schnauzer" is not known, nor is it known when it came into use. The German word schnauze means 'snout', while both schnauz and schnauzbart mean 'walrus moustache'. The word schnauzer appears in the Bilder und Sagen aus der Schweiz of Jeremias Gotthelf, published in 1842. 'Schnauz' was a common name for a dog – several dogs with this name were shown in Elberfeld in 1880. At the third international dog show of the Verein zur Veredelung der Hunderassen in Hanover in 1879, a dog named 'Schnautzer' took first place in the Rauche Pinscher or Wire-haired Pinscher class.

Schnauzers originated in southern Germany and share a common history with the German Pinscher. Dogs of this type, both rough-haired and smooth-haired, were traditionally kept as carriage dogs or as stable dogs, and so were sometimes known as Stallpinscher; they were capable ratters. Both types were known as Deutscher Pinscher, and came from the same lineage; rough-haired and smooth-haired puppies could occur in the same litter. The rough-haired type, which would later become the Schnauzer, was also known as the Rattler.

In 1880 the Pinscher was recorded in the Deutschen Hundestammbuch of the Verein zur Veredelung der Hunderassen, and the first breed standard was drawn up. Various colours were described for the rough-haired type, including iron-grey, silver-grey, grey-yellow, corn-yellow and rust-yellow. In 1895 Ludwig Beckmann described five varieties of Pinscher – the rough- and smooth-haired Pinscher, the rough- and smooth-haired Miniature Pinscher, and the Affenpinscher. Also in 1895, a breed society, the Pinscherklub, was established for both types, both rough- and smooth-haired. Another society, the Schnauzerklub München, was formed in Munich in 1907 by breeders of the Mittelschnauzer. In 1917, with the sixth edition of the stud-book, the name of the rough-haired breed was officially changed from Rauhaarige Pinscher to Schnauzer. In 1918 the Pinscherklub and the Schnauzerklub München merged to form the Pinscher-Schnauzer-Verband, which in 1921 changed its name to the present Pinscher-Schnauzer-Klub 1895 e.V.

The Giant Schnauzer was originally bred as a multipurpose farm dog for guarding property and driving animals to market. By the turn of the 20th century it was being used as a watchdog at factories, breweries, butcheries, and stockyards throughout Bavaria. The breed was unknown outside Bavaria until it was used as a military dog in World War I and World War II. The first Giant Schnauzers were imported to America in the 1930s, but they remained rare until the 1960s, when the breed became popular. In 1962, there were 23 new Giant Schnauzers registered with the American Kennel Club; in 1974 this number was 386; in 1984 it was over 800 and in 1987 it was around 1000 animals. This declined to 95 new dogs registered in 2011, and 94 in 2012.

In modern times, the Giant Schnauzer is used as a police dog; is trained for obedience, dog agility, herding, search and rescue, and Schutzhund; and is shown in conformation shows. They are also used for carting. In Europe, the breed is considered to be more of a working dog than a show dog. The focus in many European Schnauzer clubs is not so much on conformation shows, but on the working ability of the breed. In several countries, including Germany, dogs must achieve a Schutzhund Champion title before they can qualify to be a conformation champion.

== Characteristics ==
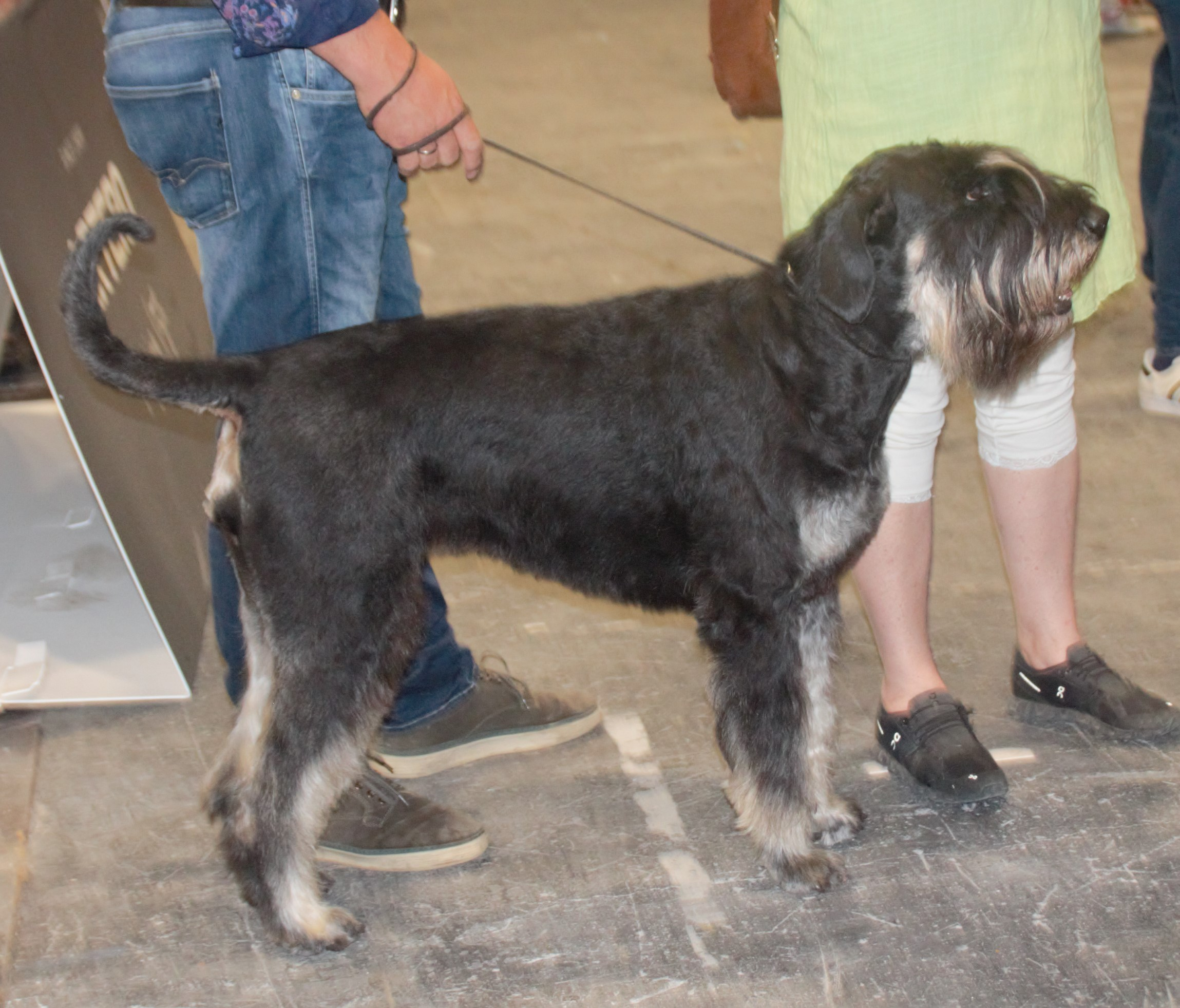
The black and silver

Although the Giant Schnauzer is a large and stocky dog, the 'Giant', in its name is not in comparison to other large dog breeds but in comparison to the Standard and Miniature Schnauzers. The AKC breed standard calls for males to stand from 65 to 70 centimetres (25.5 to 27.5 in) at the withers, and for females to stand from 60 to 65 centimetres (23.5 to 25.5 in). Giant Schnauzers are square in shape, and should resemble a larger version of the Standard Schnauzer. The tail is long and the ears are small button ears carried high on the head. Where it is legal, it is possibly docked and the ears cropped.

The head is about half the length of the dog's back from the withers to the base of the tail. The cheeks are flat, but well muscled. The coat is dense, wiry, and weather resistant. The fur on the dog's face forms a distinct "beard" and eyebrows. Its stride is long and crisp.

=== Health ===
A 2024 UK study found a life expectancy for the Giant Schnauzer of 12.1 years, compared to an average of 12.7 for purebreeds and 12 for crossbreeds.

Hip and elbow dysplasia are common. The breed is also prone to eye problems such as keratoconjunctivitis sicca, glaucoma, cataracts, multifocal retinal dysplasia, and generalized progressive retinal atrophy. It is also prone to skin diseases, such as seasonal flank alopecia, vitiligo, and follicular cysts. Cancer of the skin is common in dark-colored dogs, with the most frequently occurring varieties being melanoma of the limbs and digits, and squamous cell carcinoma of the digit. Noncancerous skin tumors are also common.

Some Giant Schnauzers develop central diabetes insipidus, autosomal recessive hypothyroidism, selective malabsorption of cobalamin, narcolepsy, cataplexy, and various seizure disorders. Some are also sensitive to sulphonamides and gold. Bone diseases and joint problems are also an issue. The most common causes of death of the dog in a Kennel Club survey were lymphoma and liver cancer, followed by heart attacks and heart failure.
