= Ratter (dog) =

Dogs for catching rats and other vermin

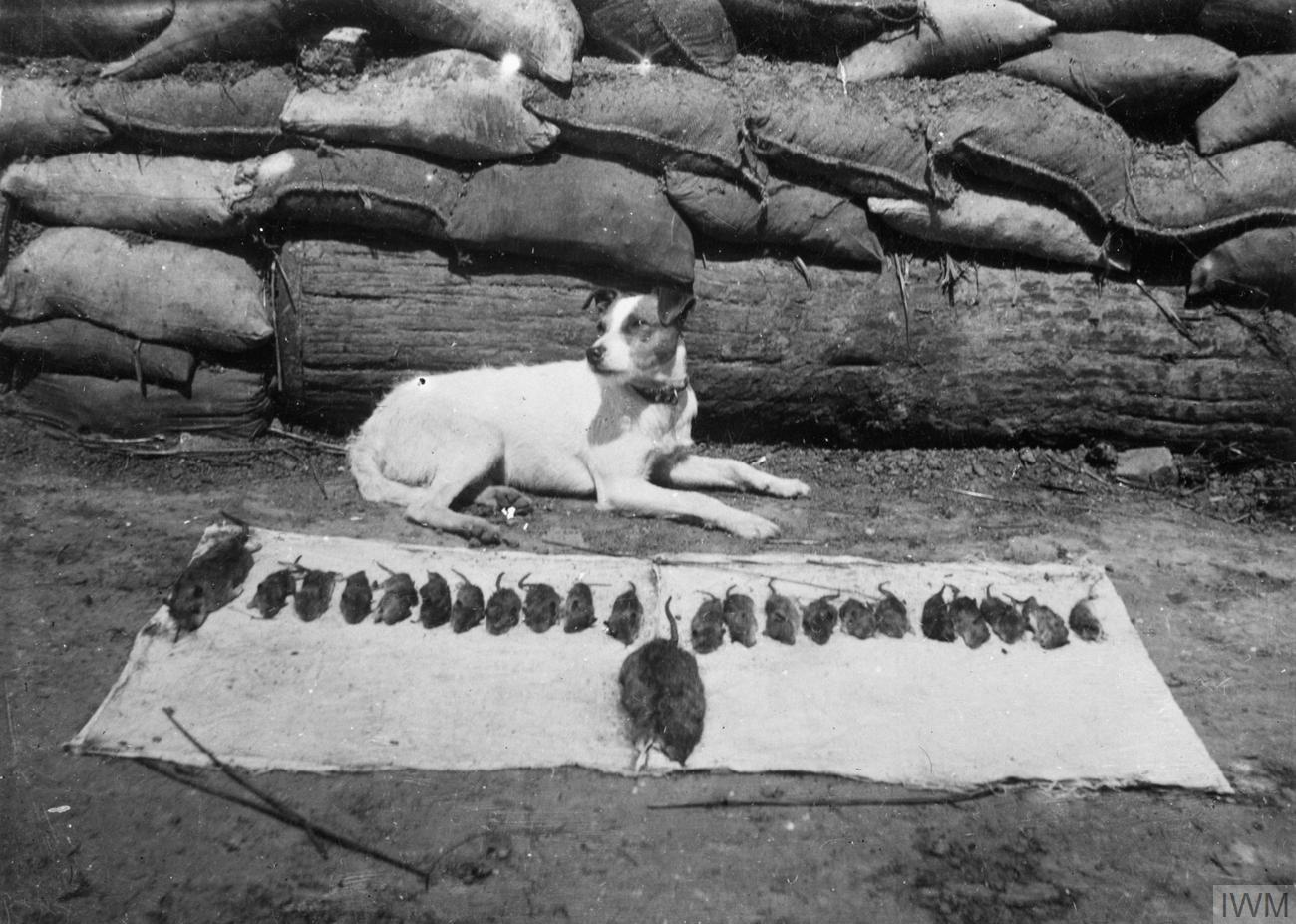
Pet dog of the Middlesex Regiment with its catch of rats in the trenches during World War I

A ratter is any dog used for catching and killing rats and similar vermin. Specialized rat-catching breeds are found in many countries. A typical ratter is small to medium-sized and has a short and smooth coat; however, a wide range of dog breeds and landraces may be used. The use of ratting dogs is widely considered to be the most environmentally friendly, humane and efficient methods of exterminating rodents. Ratting dogs are considered more efficient than domestic cats.

== History ==
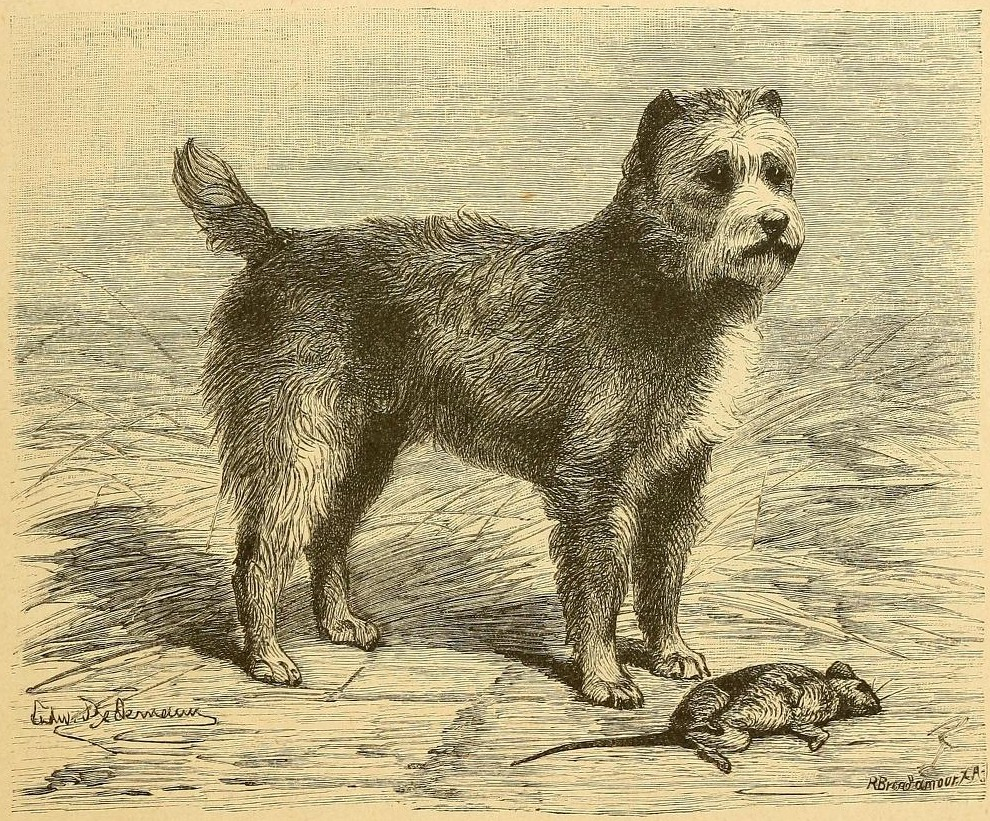
German Ratting Dog published in 1895

Ratting has existed for centuries, especially in Europe. The Centers for Disease Control and Prevention list over 20 diseases directly linked to rats, making ratting dogs popular as a way of curbing disease. Rats are associated with damage to crops and buildings. In Medieval times, rat-catchers were employed to curb the spread of disease. Rat-catchers who employed dogs were considerably more successful and rat-catchers with packs of ratting dogs would frequently travel from town to town.

Many of the first documented ratters were during the mid to late 1800s in the United Kingdom. As the population in London grew, overcrowding and inadequate waste management systems caused the hygiene levels to fall and the use of rat-catchers and their ratting dogs rose in popularity.

The Guinness Book of World Records lists as the "fastest canine rat catcher" a bull-and-terrier dog named Billy, who killed 100 rats in 5 minutes 30 seconds (average of one rat every 3.3 seconds) at an event in 1825. Guinness also credits Billy with having killed 4000 rats within a 17-hour period (average of one rat every 15.3 seconds) on an unspecified occasion; other sources, including the 1993 edition of Atlas of Dog Breeds of the World, credit him with killing 2501 rats within a 7-hour period (average of one rat every 10 seconds).

During World War I, ratting dogs were used to control rat populations in trenches.

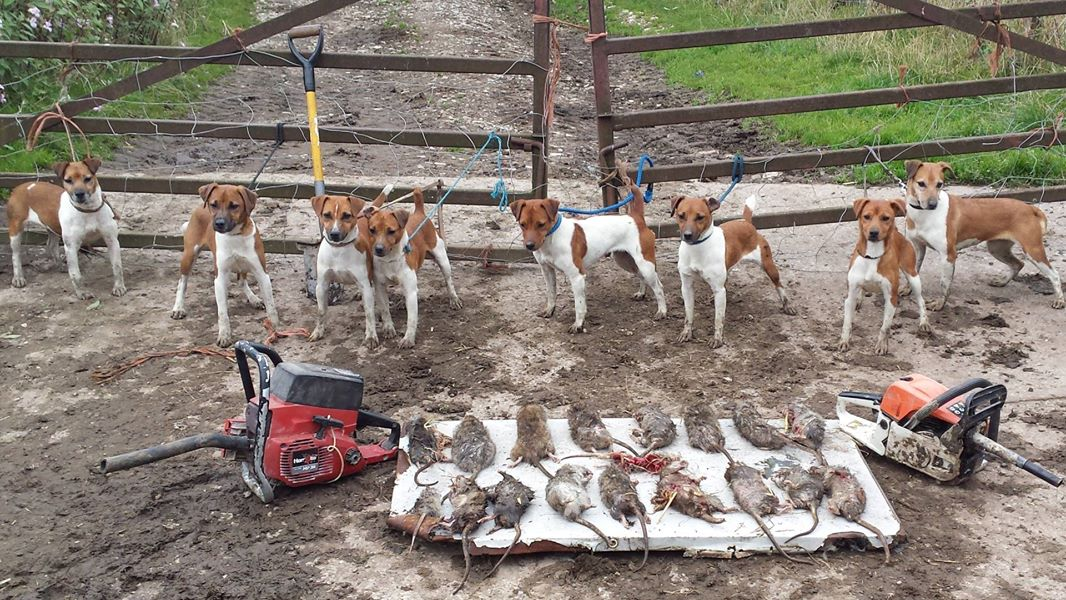
Plummer Terriers ratting

The use of ratting dogs is increasing again in many areas as rats have developed an immunity to rat poisons. Ryders Alley Trencher-fed Society (R.A.T.S.) is a New York City group founded in the 1990s that conducts organized rat hunting with dogs. The group was named by founding member Richard Reynolds after Ryders Alley in Manhattan, which was once rat infested, and the trencher-fed pack assembled to hunt. The group often hunts in Lower Manhattan locations like Theatre Alley where garbage is accessible to vermin.

== Sport ==
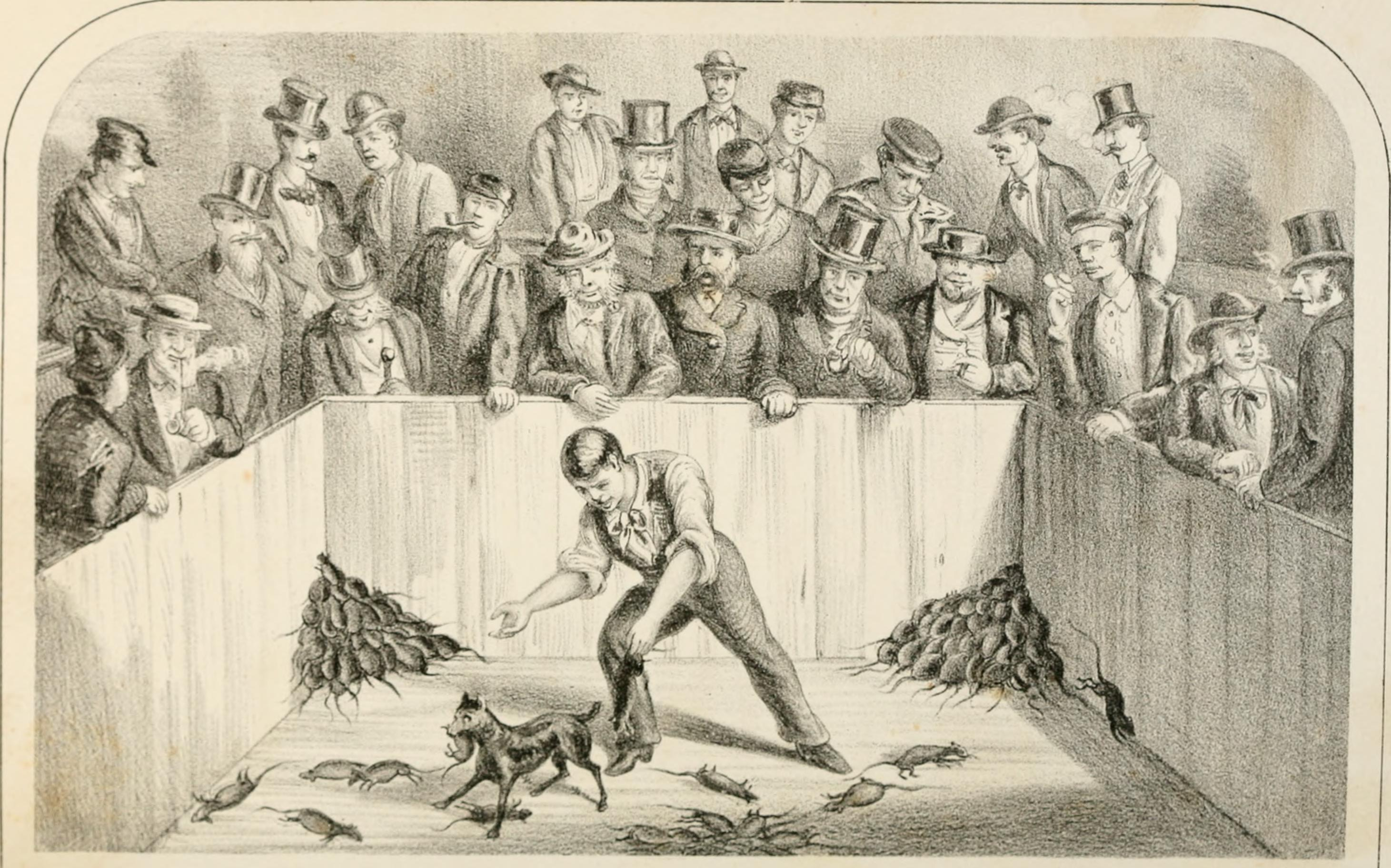
Rat-baiting in 1873

Rat-baiting is a blood sport that involves releasing captured rats in an enclosed space with spectators betting on how long a dog, usually a terrier, takes to kill the rats. It is now illegal in most countries.

An earthdog trial tests the working ability and instinct of the small, often short-legged terriers or Dachshunds. Earthdog trials involve man-made tunnels that the dogs must navigate, while scenting a rat, "the quarry". The dog must follow the scent to the quarry and then "work" the quarry. Depending on the sanctioning organization, "working" means barking, scratching, staring, pawing, digging; any active behavior. The quarry is protected at all times by wooden bars across the end of the tunnel. The hunting encounter is controlled, and neither the dog nor the quarry (usually two rats) are endangered by the activity.

Barn Hunt is the competitive sport of finding rats hidden within hay bales. Tame rats are placed in a hard tube to prevent injury and hidden in hay bales while the dogs find them.

== Ratter breeds ==
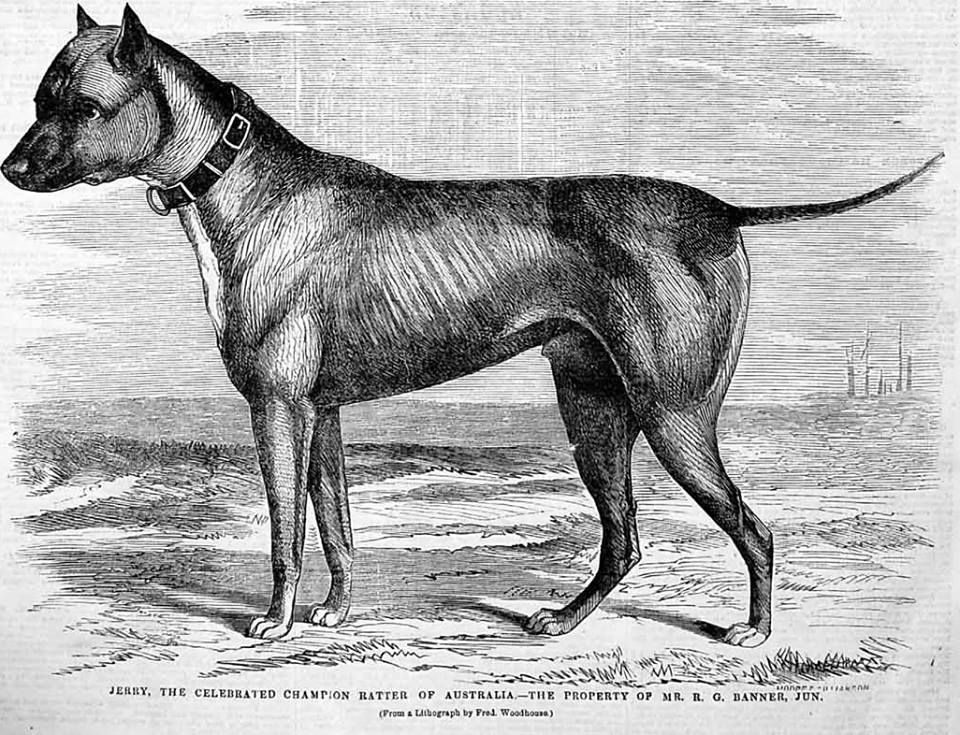
Jerry the Celebrated Champion Ratter of Australia, c.1865

Among the many breeds used for ratting are several terriers, various pinschers and schnauzers, and the ratonero breeds of Spain. Rat-catchers will also use cross-breed dogs to catch rats, including lurchers and pointer crosses.

=== Terriers and Feists ===
A terrier is a dog of any one of many breeds or landraces of the terrier type, which are typically small, wiry, game, and fearless. A feist is a small hunting dog crossed with a terrier, developed in the rural South by breeders for hunting small game and eliminating vermin. Terrier and feists commonly used as ratters include:

- Airedale Terrier
- Bedlington Terrier
- Border Terrier
- Brazilian Terrier
- Cairn Terrier
- Chilean Fox Terrier
- Irish Terrier
- Jack Russell Terrier
- Jagdterrier
- Lakeland Terrier
- Manchester Terrier
- Miniature Fox Terrier
- Mountain Feist
- Norfolk Terrier
- Norwich Terrier
- Parson Russell Terrier
- Patterdale Terrier
- Plummer Terrier
- Pražský Krysařík
- Rat Terrier
- Teddy Roosevelt Terrier
- Tenterfield Terrier
- West Highland White Terrier
- Yorkshire Terrier

=== Ratoneros ===
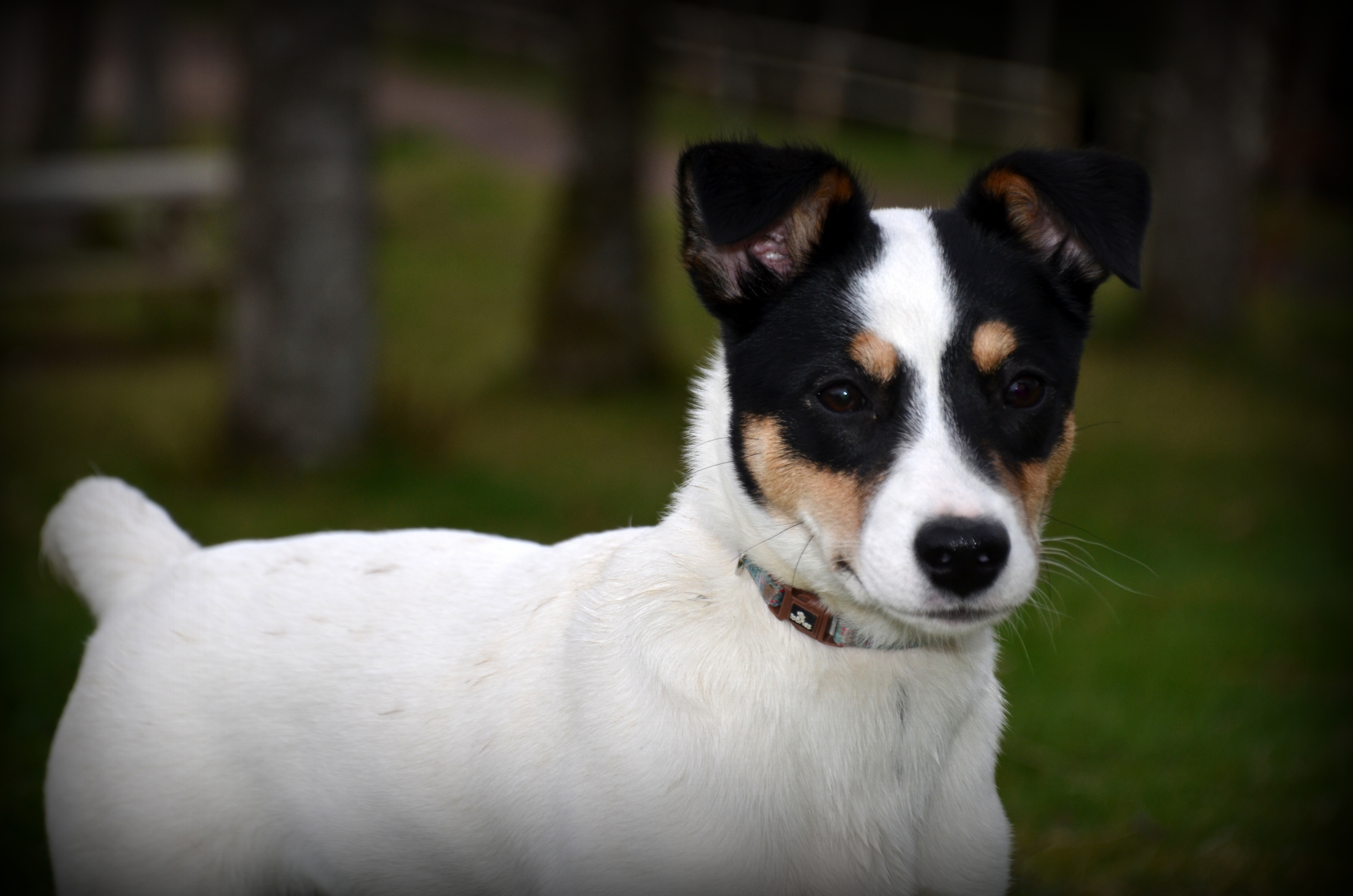
Ratting Dog in Basque country

There are five regional breeds of ratonero or ratter in Spain:

- Ratonero Bodeguero Andaluz from Andalusia
- Ca Rater Mallorquí or Ratonero Mallorquín of Mallorca
- Ratonero Murciano from Murcia
- Valencian Terrier or Ratonero Valenciano of Valencia
- Villanuco de Las Encartaciones in the Basque Country

=== Pinschers and Schnauzers ===
Many dogs of pinscher and schnauzer type were traditionally used to catch rats; modern breeds derived from those include:

- Affenpinscher
- Austrian Pinscher
- Danish-Swedish Farmdog
- Dutch Smoushond
- German Pinscher
- Miniature Pinscher
- Miniature Schnauzer
- Standard Schnauzer

=== Other ===
- Brussels Griffon
- Dachshund
- Lurcher
- Schipperke
- Small Međimurje Dog

== See also ==
- Working terrier
