= Fortune Dogs =

Japanese manga series

- ふぉうちゅんドッグす
- Created by: Shuji Kishihara; Yasuharu Tomono
- Directed by: Hiroshi Saito
- Music by: Hiroshi Motokura; AMAZeus
- Country of origin: Japan
- Original language: Japanese

Production
- Producers: Norio Yamakawa; Shunji Namiki; Akimoto Okagawa
- Animator: Vega Entertainment
- Production companies: TV Tokyo; TV Tokyo Medianet; Tsuburaya Entertainment

Original release
- Network: TXN (TV Tokyo)
- Release: July 4, 2002 – March 29, 2003

Related
- Manga
- Written by: Kenta Tomono
- Illustrated by: Ito Makoto
- Published by: Kodansha
- Magazine: Nakayoshi
- Original run: August 2002 – May 2005

Fortune Dogs (ふぉうちゅんドッグす, Fōchun Doggusu) is an anime television series produced by Vega Enterteinament that aired on TV Tokyo and its affiliates from July 4, 2002, to March 29, 2003. A manga adaptation by Kenta Tomono and Ito Makoto was serialized in Kodansha's Nakayoshi magazine.

The main character's story presents the journey of the archetypal hero found in world mythologies and religions (the Monomyth), a theory developed by Joseph Campbell in his book The Hero with a Thousand Faces.

== Plot ==
A French Bulldog is adopted from the Happy Kennel by a girl named Ai and is given the name Alex. She tells him stories and reads to him from a book titled The Adventures of Freddy about dog who leaves home to find the Fortune Tree.

However, he is separated from Ai when he mistakenly follows a girl wearing the same clothes as Ai on a bus. Adopting the name Freddy, after the hero in Ai's storybook, Alex begins his quest to return to Ai. But before he can return to his owner, Freddy and his new friends must find the Fortune Tree and save it from dying, otherwise all the humans in the world will lose their good will and no longer care about their pets.

== Characters ==
=== Dogs ===
- Alex/Freddy (フレディー) - A male French Bulldog. He embarked on a quest to return to Ai when he mistakenly followed a girl wearing the same clothes as Ai into a bus in episode 2. In episode 3, Alex took on the name Freddy, after the hero in Ai's story book titled The Adventures of Freddy, about a dog leaving home to find the Fortune Tree.
- Shibata (シバタ) - Shiba Inu
- Chibiyama (チビヤマ) - Chihuahua
- Don Corocorone (ドン・コロコローネ) - A Bulldog, his owner is a thief.
- Shina (シーナ) - Shih Tzu
- Cammy (キャミー) - A female Cavalier King Charles Spaniel show dog Freddy met in episode 4. She was raised by humans who rarely let her to go outside. Dach showed affection over her, but left her in the end.
- Pappy (パピー) - Papillon
- Dach (ドッチ) - A male field Dachshund Alex met in episode 3. He was an expert digger, once owned by the human Jack. Dach taught Alex about interacting with humans. Freddy joined Dach's travel quest at the end of episode 3.
- Max (マックス) - A male Boxer who had come from Happy Kennel, and had met Alex while both were still in the kennel. Although inexperienced as a guard dog, it has a strong sense of food. Its favourite food is milk. It was evicted by its owner in episode 8 after a male robber had broken into the same house twice, and the owner discovered Freddy, Dach, Max were inside the damaged house.
- Lovely (ラブリー) - Labrador Retriever
- Yoko (ヨーコ) - Yorkshire Terrier
- Kowaruski (コワルスキー) - Weimaraner
- Minich - (ミニッチ) Miniature Pinscher
- Ryoma (リョウマ) - An old male Tosa who had grown up in mountains. Ryoma started to live in the wild when delivery truck that carries Ryoma to its customer crashed. He taught Freddy about being a wild dog, identifying and marking dog scents, circular patrolling. After losing a fight against Freezer, Ryoma told Freddy to leave, but Freddy found Ryoma in episode 6. At the end of episode 6, an old woman was identified to be Ryoma's owner. However, Ryoma felt betrayed by its owner when the owner was sick and could not take care of Ryoma while in hospital. When Ryoma's owner collapsed again in episode 6, Ryoma defeated Freezer on its way to the owner, and reunited with the owner at the end.
- Bruto (ブルート) - Bulldog
- Pochi (ポッチ) - Mixed-breed
- Martaff (マータフ) - Doberman Pinscher. A male field dog in episode 4, with Osaka accent.
- Rikyu (リキュー) - Akita Inu. Episode based on real Japanese Akita Hachikō.
- Sanbe (サンペー) - Welsh Corgi Pembroke
- Kinta (キンタ) - Golden Retriever
- Jess (ジャズ) - Golden Retriever, Kinta's mother
- Himechin (ヒメチン) - Japanese Chin
- Daltian (ダルジャン) - A female Dalmatian from episode 6 with unidentified owner.
- Poron - (ポロン) Pomeranian
- B-chan - (ビーチャン) Beagle
- Marco - (マルコ) Maltese
- Arnest (アーネスト) - A female Afghan Hound Alex met in episode 2 outside bakery.
- Leon (レオン) - Bloodhound
- Pugbou (パグボー) - Pug, arrested by the police dogs, asks Freddy to help him
- Mook (ムック) - A male Old English Sheepdog raised by Rogers in episode 9.
- Eiji (エージ) - Male German Shepherd owned by Happy Kennel that used to work for police as sniffing dog, and always travel with Cammy.
- Bright (ブライト) - Samoyed
- Wang (ワン) - Chow Chow
- Jackie (ジャッキー) - Jack Russell Terrier
- Yubi (ユーピー) - A robot
- Kosuke (コースケ) - Norwich Terrier, a police dog, pursues Corocorone's owner.
- Zenji - (ゼンジー) Pekingese
- Cocco (コッコ) - An American Cocker Spaniel.
- Tomiko - (トミコ) Shar Pei
- Noppe - (ノッペ) Bull Terrier
- Kitchen (キッチン) - A male Rough Collie/Shetland Sheepdog from episode 6 with a male owner. In episode 7, Kitchen altered its owner for the collapsed Ryoma's owner after hearing Ryoma's call.
- Bernadon (バーナードン) - St. Bernard
- Wealthy (ウエルシー) - West Highland White Terrier
- Freezer (フリーザー) - Siberian Husky, male dog that defeated Ryoma in a territorial fight in episode 5, but beaten by Ryoma in episode 7.
- Airi (アイリ) - Irish Setter
- Whity (ホワイティ) - A female Poodle in episode 9, owned by Rogers.
- Shunaemon (シュナエモン) - Standard Schnauzer
- Shetlan (シェトラン) - Shetland Sheepdog
- Edgar (エドガー) - A Wire Fox Terrier that taught Freddy to get food by begging to sausage vendor in episode 6.
- Mace (メース) - Great Dane owned by Happy Kennel that used to work for police as sniffing dog, and always travel with Grace.
- Police Dog - Giant Schnauzer
- Police Dog - English Pointer
- Police Dog - English Pointer

=== Birds ===
- Myna (九官鳥) - A bird that guarded bakery in episode 3.

=== Humans ===
- Alex (アレックス) - Owner of Happy Kennel. In addition to selling dogs, he also visits the owners of the dogs he sold.
- Ai-chan (愛ちゃん) - Freddy's adopter in episode 1.
- Jack (ジャック) - Dooch's former human owner in episode 3. Jack is obsessed on taking any dog he sees to home.
- Rogers (ロジャース) - Owner of Whitety, Mook, and Rogers farm, a farm for cows and sheep.

=== Cast ===
- Freddy - Yumiko Kobayashi
- Alice - Rie Satou
- Cocco - Chiaki Takahashi
- Shibata- Akeno Watanabe
- B-Chan - Chika Sakamoto
- Max - Kouichi Toochika
- Chibiyama - Miwa Matsumoto
- Leon - Dai Matsumoto
- Pochi - Rica Matsumoto
- Bluto - Junichi Endou
- Rikyu - Chō
- Dach - Yuu Mizushima
- Kowalski - Shoto Kashii

== Episodes ==
No.	Title	Original release date
1	"A Fateful Encounter"; Transliteration: "Unmeinodeai" (Japanese: 運命の出会い)	July 4, 2002
2	"Sudden Goodbye"; Transliteration: "Totsuzen no Sayonara" (Japanese: 突然のさよなら)	July 11, 2002
3	"Second Friend, Dach"; Transliteration: "2-Banme no Tomodachi, Dahha" (Japanese: 2番目の友達、ドッチ)	July 18, 2002
4	"Cammy's Day Off"; Transliteration: "Kyamī no kyūjitsu" (Japanese: キャミーの休日)	July 25, 2002
5	"Lost Freddy"; Transliteration: "Maigo no Furedī" (Japanese: 迷子のフレディー)	August 1, 2002
6	"Pride of an Old Dog"; Transliteration: "Rōken no Puraido" (Japanese: 老犬のプライド)	August 8, 2002
7	"A True Partner"; Transliteration: "Hontō no Pātonā" (Japanese: 本当のパートナー)	August 15, 2002
8	"Reunited with Max"; Transliteration: "Makkusu to Saikai" (Japanese: マックスと再会)	August 22, 2002
9	"Good luck, Mukku!"; Transliteration: "Ganbare! Mukku!" (Japanese: がんばれ! ムック!)	August 29, 2002
10	"Heartfelt Bonds"; Transliteration: "Kokoro no Kizuna" (Japanese: 心の絆)	September 5, 2002
11	"Run! Freddie!"; Transliteration: "Hashire! Furedī!" (Japanese: 走れ! フレディー!)	September 12, 2002
12	"The Path Kokko Chose"; Transliteration: "Kokko no Eranda Michi" (Japanese: 俺はロックじゃない)	September 19, 2002
13	"I'm Not Rock!"; Transliteration: "Ore wa rokku janai!" (Japanese: 俺はロックじゃない!)	September 26, 2002
14	"Don Colocolone arrives!" Transliteration: "Don Korokorōne sanjō!" (Japanese: ドン・コロコローネ参上!)	October 5, 2002
15	"Until We Meet Again..."; Transliteration: "Mataauhimade…" (Japanese: また逢う日まで…!)	October 12, 2002
16	"Pochi the Underachiever"; Transliteration: "Ochikobore no Potchi" (Japanese: 落ちこぼれのポッチ)	October 19, 2002
17	"Angry Max"; Transliteration: "Okotta Makkusu" (Japanese: 怒ったマックス)	October 26, 2002
18	"Let's dig for Treasure!"; Transliteration: "Horou ze, Otakara!" (Japanese: 掘ろうぜ、お宝!)	November 2, 2002
19	"Is This Shibata's Way of Life?"; Transliteration: "Kore ga Shibata no Ikiru Michi!?" (Japanese: これがシバタの生きる道!?)	November 9, 2002
20	"Goodbye, Konnichiha"; Transliteration: "Sayonara-san, kon'nichiwa" (Japanese: サヨナラさん、コンニチハ)	November 16, 2002
21	"Who is Youpi?"; Transliteration: "Yūpī tte Dare?" (Japanese: ユーピーって誰?)	November 23, 2002
22	"Encounter"; Transliteration: "Deai" (Japanese: 出逢い)	November 30, 2002
23	"The Perfect Partner"; Transliteration: "Saikō no Pātonā" (Japanese: 最高のパートナー)	December 7, 2002
24	"Zenji in Love With a Cat"; Transliteration: "Neko ni koi Shita Zenjī" (Japanese: ネコに恋したゼンジー)	December 14, 2002
25	"Jackie, the Genius Dog"; Transliteration: "Tensai inu, Jakkī" (Japanese: 天才犬、ジャッキー)	December 21, 2002
26	"It Was Me!?"; Transliteration: "Watashi tte ￮￮datta no!?" (Japanese: 私って○○だったの!?)	December 28, 2002
27	"Cucco's Treasure"; Transliteration: "Kokko no takaramono" (Japanese: コッコの宝物)	January 4, 2003
28	"Rikyu in Front of the Station"; Transliteration: "Ekimae no Rikyū" (Japanese: 駅前のリキュー)	January 11, 2003
29	"Because Sanpei is Here"; Transliteration: "Sanpē ga Iteku Waru kara" (Japanese: サンペーがいてくれるから)	January 18, 2003
30	"We Finally Met"; Transliteration: "Yatto Aeta ne" (Japanese: やっと会えたね)	January 25, 2003
31	"A New Journey"; Transliteration: "Aratanaru Tabi-dachi" (Japanese: 新たなる旅立ち)	February 1, 2003
32	"Stand up, Freddie!"; Transliteration: "Tachi Agare, Furedī!" (Japanese: 立ち上がれ、フレディー!)	February 8, 2003
33	"A Friend who Gave me Courage"; Transliteration: "Yūki o Kureta Tomodachi" (Japanese: 勇気をくれた友達)	February 15, 2003
34	"Corocorone's Determination"; Transliteration: "Korokonōne no Ketsui" (Japanese: コロコローネの決意)	February 22, 2003
35	"Words of the Elders"; Transliteration: "Chōrō no Kotoba" (Japanese: 長老の言葉)	March 1, 2003
36	"The Secret of the Guardian Stone"; Transliteration: "Mamori-seki no Himitsu" (Japanese: 守り石の秘密)	March 8, 2003
37	"Freddy the Legendary Dog"; Transliteration: "Densetsu no Inu・Furedī" (Japanese: 伝説の犬・フレディー)	March 15, 2003
38	"Save the Fortune Tree!"; Transliteration: "Fōchan Tsurī o Sukue!" (Japanese: ふぉうちゅんツリーを救え!)	March 22, 2003
39	"Welcome Back, Freddie"; Transliteration: "Okaeri, Furedī" (Japanese: おかえり、フレディー)	March 29, 2003
