= Pinscher =

Dog type

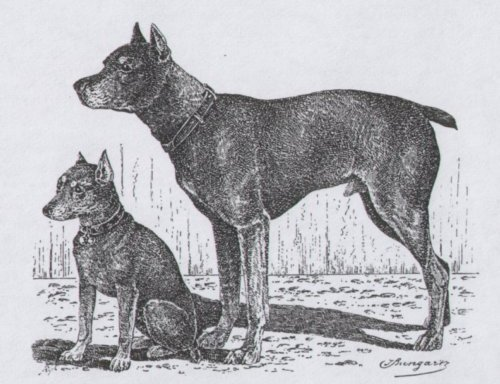
German Pinscher and Miniature Pinscher, breeds of the Pinscher group. Before 1888.

The Pinscher is a group of German dog breeds, developed originally as ratters on farms or as guard dogs. In the twenty-first century they are commonly kept as companion animals.

== Origins ==
It is considered that the German Pinscher is a prototypical Pinscher and one of the oldest German breeds, more closely related to the Standard Schnauzer (once known as the Wire-Haired Pinscher) than the Dobermann and other Pinschers. Since the mid-19th century, breeders stopped crossbreeding these coat types, and with the formation of the German Pinscher-Schnauzer-Club (PSK) in 1895, advanced them to distinct breed varieties.

== Etymology ==
There are several theories on the etymology of the word Pinscher; that it derives from French "pincer", meaning "to seize" and "to nip", or "to bite" and "to grip" which are possibly related to their function of catching vermin on the farm, that it derives from English "pinch" referring to their clipped ears, "fox terrier" type of dog (considered that it was a descriptive term meaning "settler" or "terrier" dog method of working, and not heritage), or biter, although the verb "pinch" has the same early 13th century Old North French *pinchier derivation, which itself possibly originates from Vulgar Latin.

== Breeds ==
The Fédération Cynologique Internationale recognizes the following pinscher breeds in Group 2, Section 1: Pinschers and Schnauzers, Section 1.1 Pinscher:

- Austrian Pinscher (Österreichischer Pinscher, no. 64)
- Dobermann (no. 143)
- German Pinscher (Deutscher Pinscher, no. 184)
- Miniature Pinscher (Zwergpinscher, no. 185)
- Affenpinscher (no. 186)

Provisional:

- Danish-Swedish Farmdog (Dansk-svensk gårdshund, no. 356)
- In addition, the Harlequin Pinscher was earlier accepted by the FCI, but it was officially removed after its extinction.

There may be other related hunting dogs called pinscher that are not recognized breeds. In addition, individual breeders often attempt the creation of new breeds which they may call pinschers. One example of these is the Carlin Pinscher, which has been developed by crossing the Pug with the Miniature Pinscher, or other similar breeds.

== Gallery ==
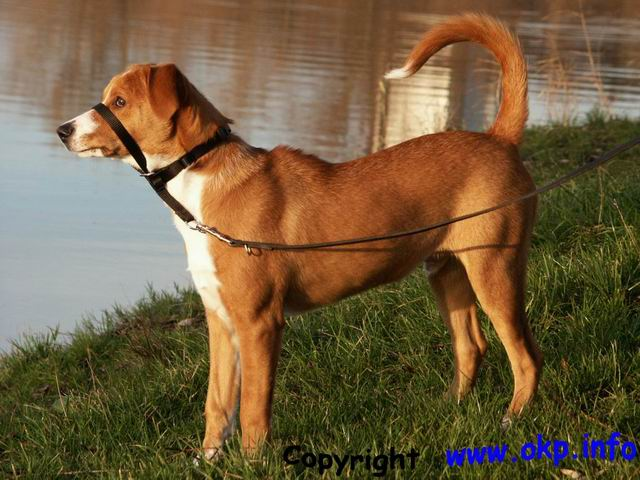
Austrian Pinscher

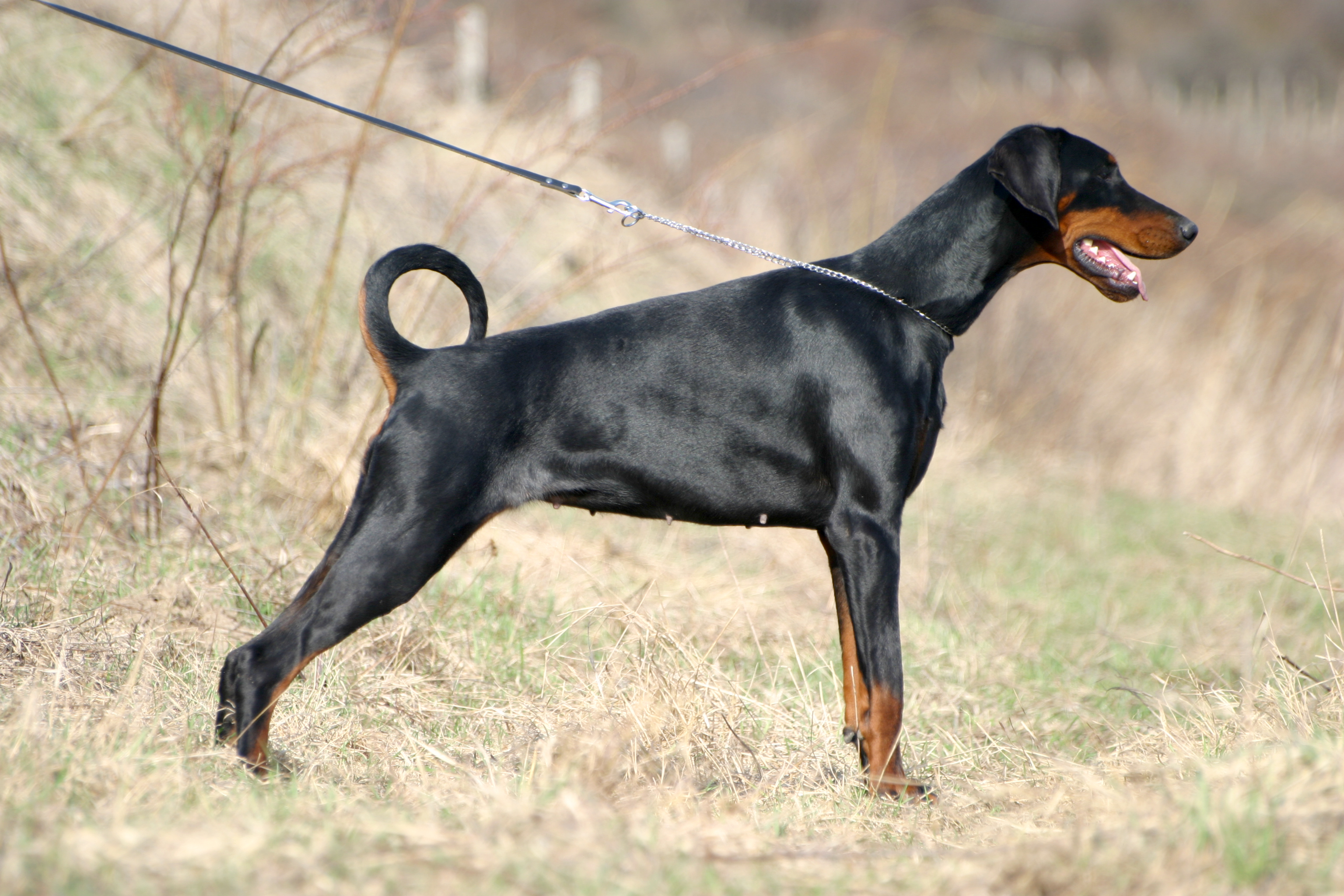
Dobermann

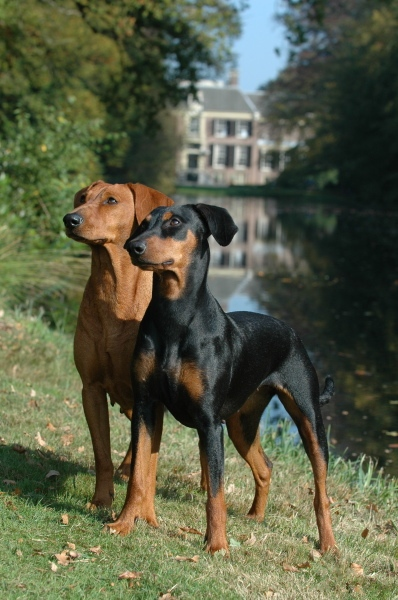
German Pinschers

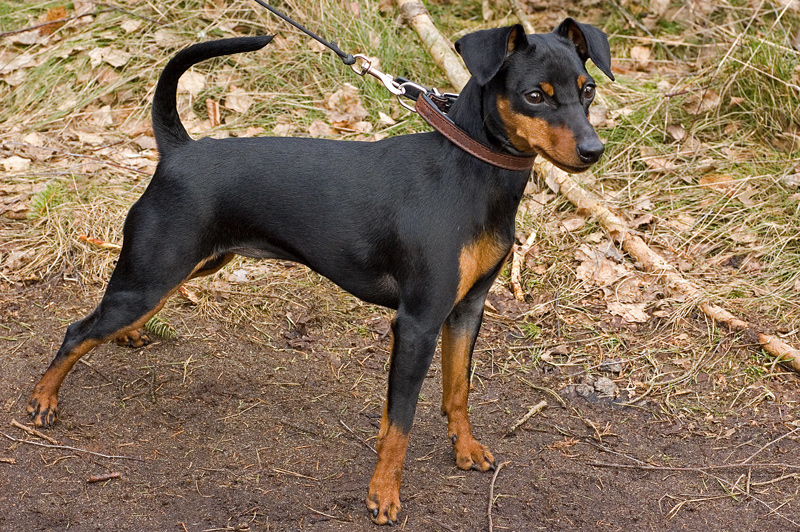
Miniature Pinscher

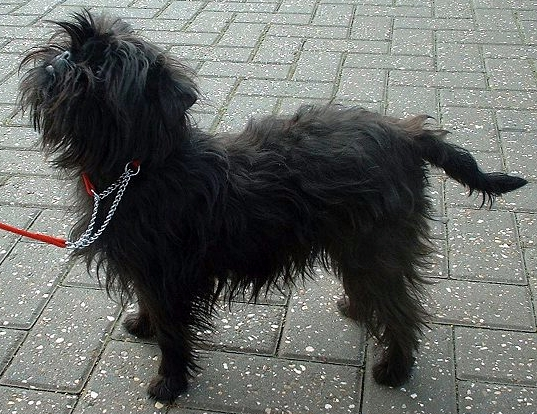
Affenpinscher
