= Standard Schnauzer =

German breed of dog

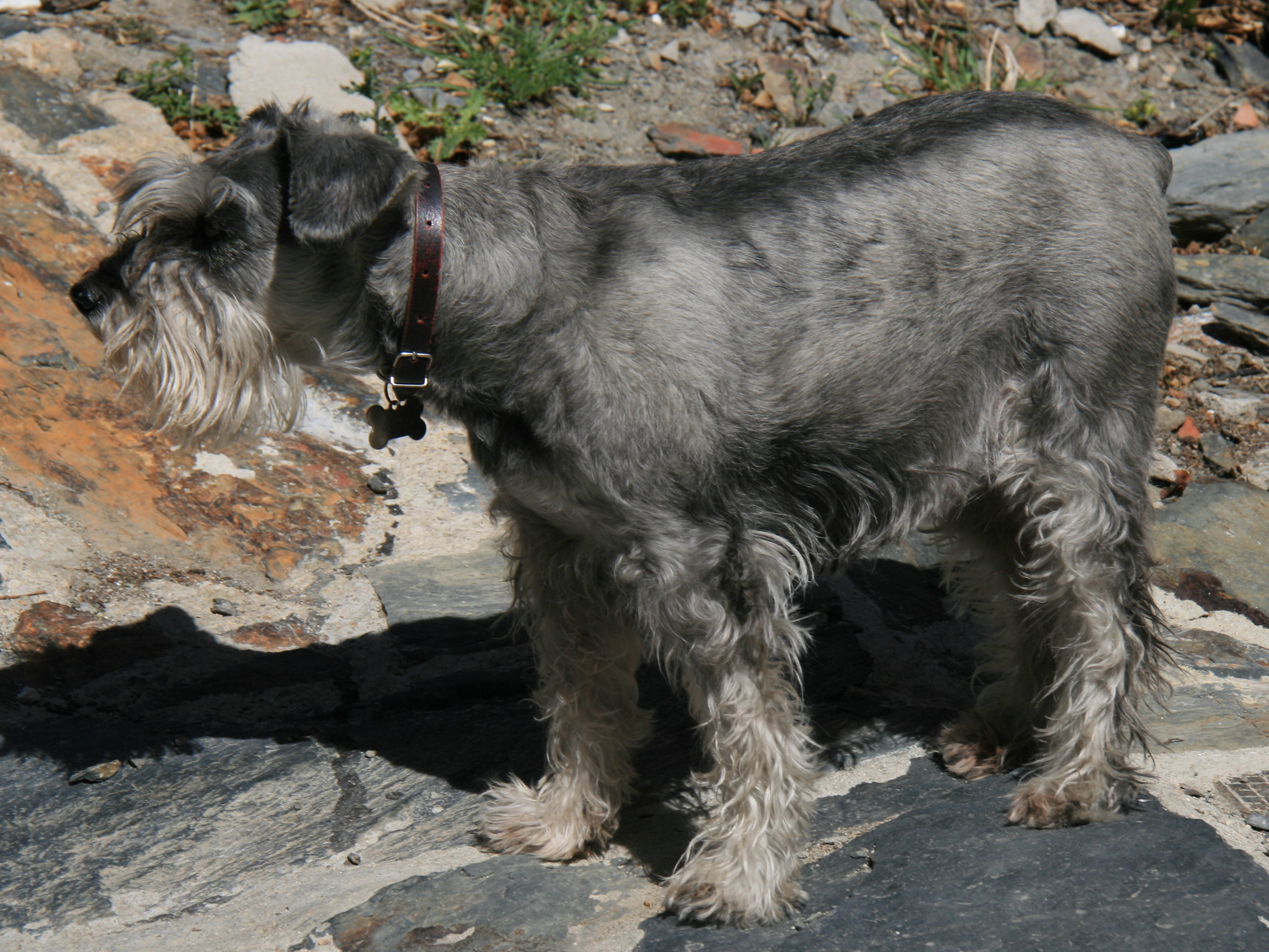
- The pepper-and-salt
- Other names: Standard Schnauzer; Mittelschnauzer; Rattenfänger; Rattler; Rauche Pinscher; Rauhaarige Pinscher; Wire-Haired Pinscher
- Origin: Germany
Traits
- Height: 45–50 cm (18–20 in)
- Weight: 14–20 kg (30–45 lb)
- Colour: pepper-and-salt; black
Kennel club standards
- Verband für das Deutsche Hundewesen: standard
- Fédération Cynologique Internationale: standard

The Standard Schnauzer (Note: German: [ˈʃnaʊ̯t͡sɐ]) or Mittelschnauzer is a German breed of dog in the Pinscher and Schnauzer group. It is characterised by an abundant bristly beard and whiskers, usually lighter than the coat. It is one of three Schnauzer breeds, the others being the Giant Schnauzer or Riesenschnauzer, and the Miniature Schnauzer or Zwergschnauzer. In Germany it is an endangered breed, and is listed in category III of the Rote Liste of the Gesellschaft zur Erhaltung alter und gefährdeter Haustierrassen.

Its development as a breed dates from the 1880s, in southern Germany. It is a robust and squarely-built dog of medium size, of working or utility type; the coat may be salt-and-pepper or black. A dog of this type was exhibited in Hanover in 1879; another was "Best in Show" at the Westminster Kennel Club in the United States in 1997.

== History ==
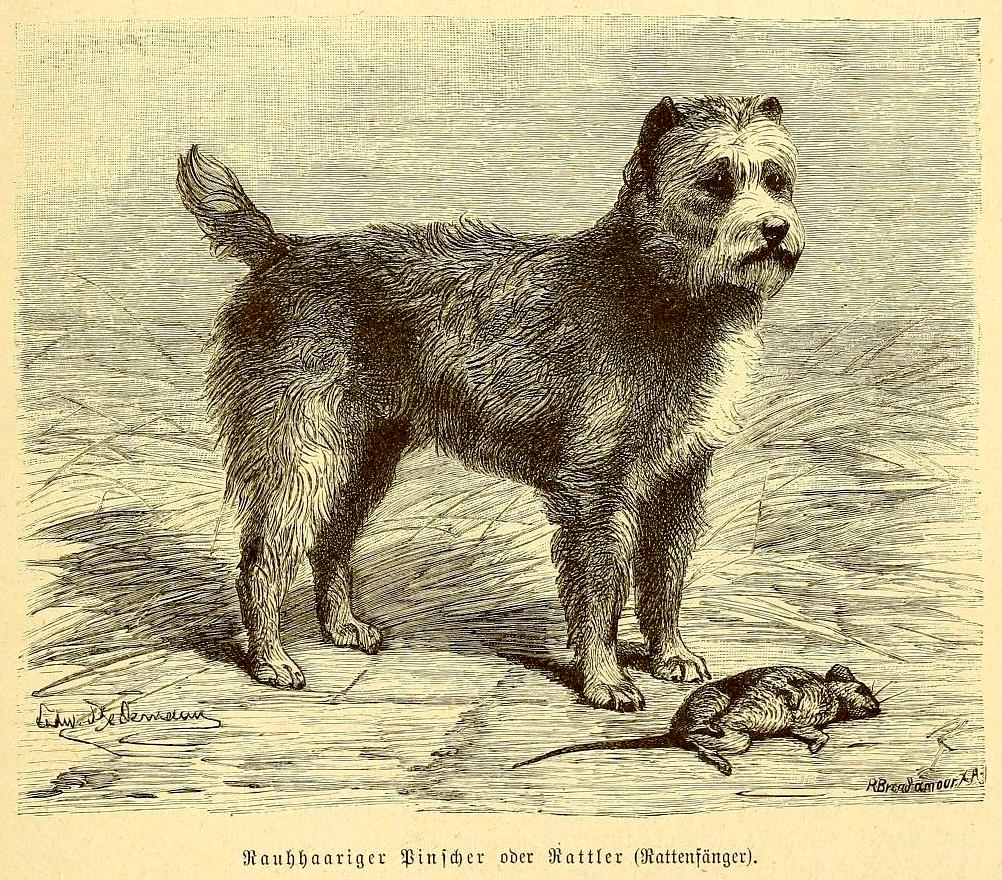
Wire-haired Pinscher, illustration by Ludwig Beckmann from his Geschichte und Beschreibung der Rassen des Hundes, 1895

Schnauzer of medium size, from W. E. Mason's work Dogs of All Nations (1915) prepared for the Panama–Pacific International Exposition

Neither the origin of the breed name, nor when it came into use, is known. The German word schnauze means 'snout', while both schnauz and schnauzbart mean 'walrus moustache'. The word schnauzer appears in the Bilder und Sagen aus der Schweiz of Jeremias Gotthelf, published in 1842. 'Schnauz' was a common name for a dog – several dogs with this name were shown in Elberfeld in 1880. At the third international dog show of the Verein zur Veredelung der Hunderassen in Hanover in 1879, a dog named 'Schnautzer' took first place in the Rauche Pinscher or Wire-haired Pinscher class.

The Schnauzer originated in southern Germany; it shares a common history with the German Pinscher. Dogs of this type, both rough-haired and smooth-haired, were traditionally kept as carriage dogs or as stable dogs, and so were sometimes known as Stallpinscher; they were capable ratters. Both types were known as Deutscher Pinscher, and came from the same lineage; rough-haired and smooth-haired puppies could occur in the same litter. The rough-haired type, which would later become the Schnauzer, was also known as the Rattler.

In 1880 the Pinscher was recorded in the Deutschen Hundestammbuch of the Verein zur Veredelung der Hunderassen, and the first breed standard was drawn up. Various colours were described for the rough-haired type, including iron-grey, silver-grey, grey-yellow, corn-yellow and rust-yellow. In 1895 Ludwig Beckmann described five varieties of Pinscher – the rough- and smooth-haired Pinscher, the rough- and smooth-haired Miniature Pinscher, and the Affenpinscher. Also in 1895, a breed society, the Pinscherklub, was established for both types, both rough- and smooth-haired. Another society, the Schnauzerklub München, was formed in Munich in 1907 by breeders of the Mittelschnauzer. In 1917, with the sixth edition of the stud-book, the name of the rough-haired breed was officially changed from Rauhaarige Pinscher to Schnauzer. In 1918 the Pinscherklub and the Schnauzerklub München merged to form the Pinscher-Schnauzer-Verband, which in 1921 changed its name to the present Pinscher-Schnauzer-Klub 1895 e.V.

In the interwar period the pepper-and-salt Schnauzer flourished, while the black was less often seen; after the end of the Second World War, the reverse was true. The Schnauzer was definitively accepted by the Fédération Cynologique Internationale in 1955. In the fifteen-year period from 2007 to 2021, annual registrations in Germany varied between 370 and 582, with an annual average of 464.

Since 2014 the pepper-and-salt Schnauzer has been on the Rote Liste of the Gesellschaft zur Erhaltung alter und gefährdeter Haustierrassen. In 2022 its conservation status was listed as gefährdet, 'endangered', the third-highest category of endangerment of the organisation. In 2018 a total of 201 pepper-and-salt puppies were whelped in 26 litters.

A few Schnauzers were exported to the United States before the outbreak of the First World War. In 1925 the Wire-Haired Pinscher Club of America was started, covering both standard-sized and miniature Schnauzers; in 1933 it was divided into two separate clubs, one of them the Standard Schnauzer Club of America.

== Characteristics ==
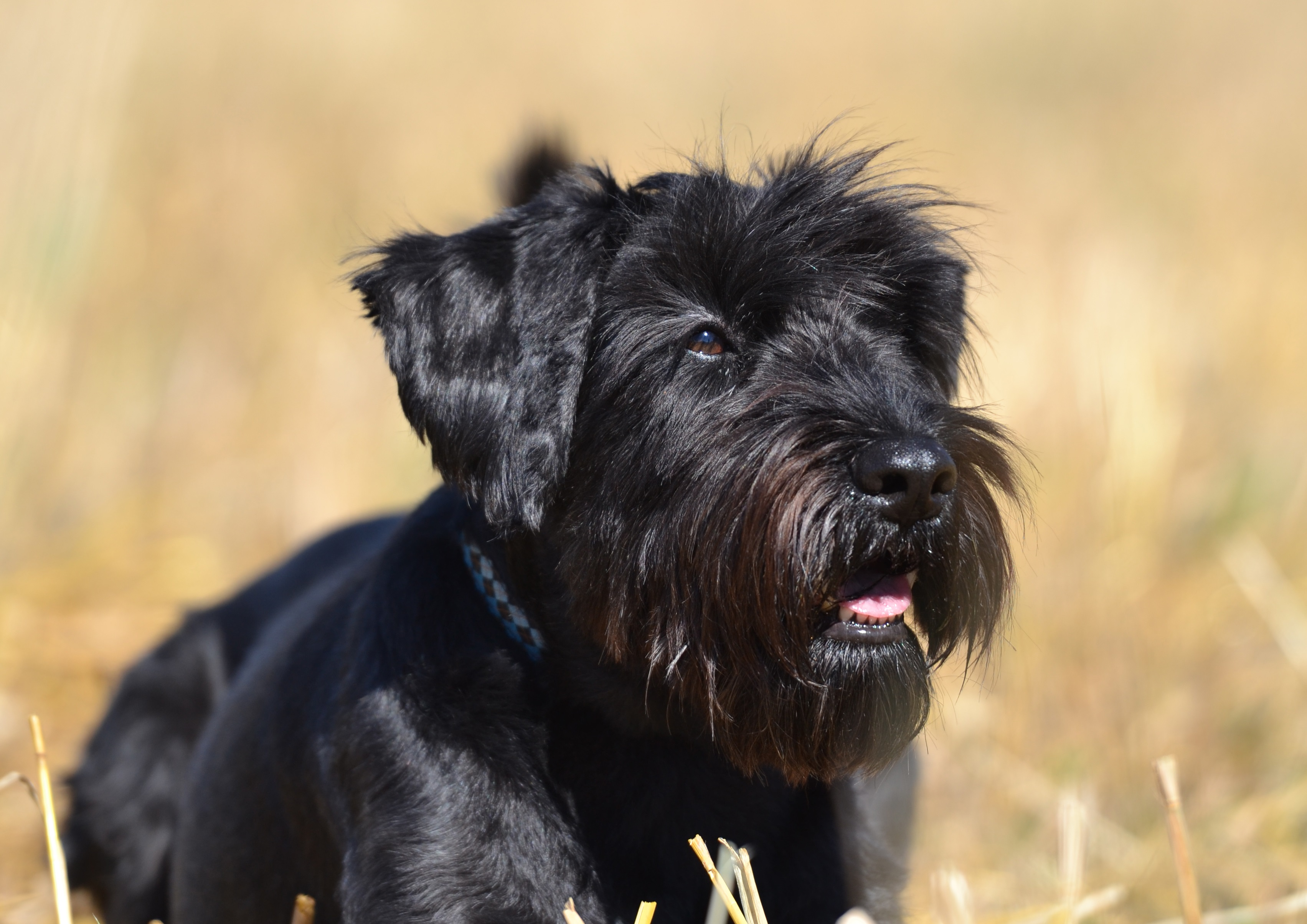
The black

The Schnauzer is a robust and squarely-built dog of medium size, of working or utility type. Height at the withers is usually in the range 45–50 cm for both bitches and dogs, while the range for bodyweights is variously given as 14–20 kg or 15–24 kg. The coat is hard, wiry and dense, with a thick soft under-coat; it may be salt-and-pepper or black. In the salt-and-pepper, the grey may vary from pale silver-grey to dark iron-grey, always with a mask of a darker shade. The ears are v-shaped, are set high and hang close to the face. The eyes are dark, the nose and lips are black.

Median lifespan is reported to be 13 years, slightly greater than the median for all dogs, 12.5 years.

== Use ==
The Schnauzer was traditionally kept as a farm dog, with a particular aptitude for ratting. In the twenty-first century it is commonly kept as a companion animal.
