= German Pinscher =

German breed of dog

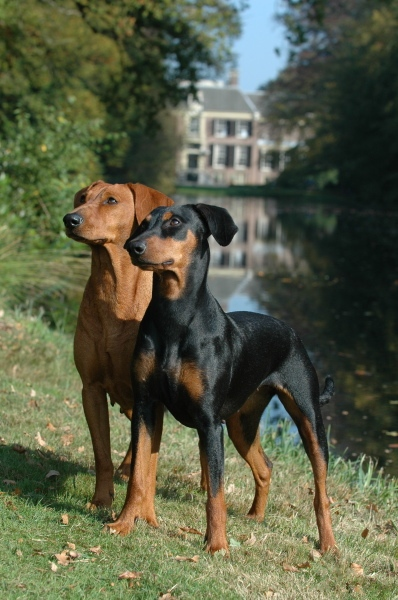
- The two coat colours, self-coloured red and black-and-tan
- Other names: Deutscher Pinscher; Standard Pinscher
- Origin: Germany
Traits
- Height: 45–50 cm (18–20 in)
- Weight: 14–20 kg (30–45 lb)
- Coat: dense, short, smooth
- Colour: self-coloured red; black-and-tan
Kennel club standards
- Verband für das Deutsche Hundewesen: standard
- Fédération Cynologique Internationale: standard

The German Pinscher or Deutscher Pinscher is a German breed of dog in the Pinscher and Schnauzer group. It shares common origins with the Schnauzer, of which it is essentially a short-haired equivalent. It is seen in two colours, either black-and-tan or self-coloured red, this varying from deer-red to a dark reddish brown.

It is an endangered breed, and is listed in category III of the Rote Liste of the Gesellschaft zur Erhaltung alter und gefährdeter Haustierrassen. It is a distinct and separate breed from the Affenpinscher, the Austrian Pinscher and the Miniature Pinscher or Zwergpinscher.

It was formerly kept as a carriage dog, as a stable dog or as a ratter.

== History ==
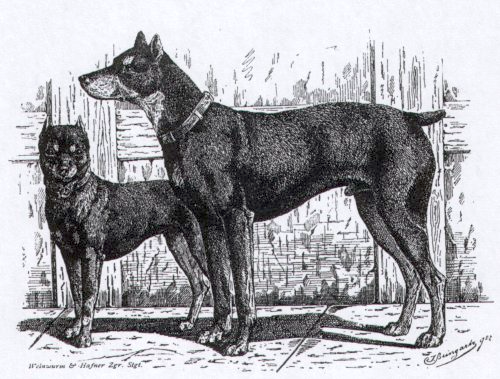
Jean Bungartz, Deutscher Pinscher and Zwergpinscher, Illustration from Kynos, 1884

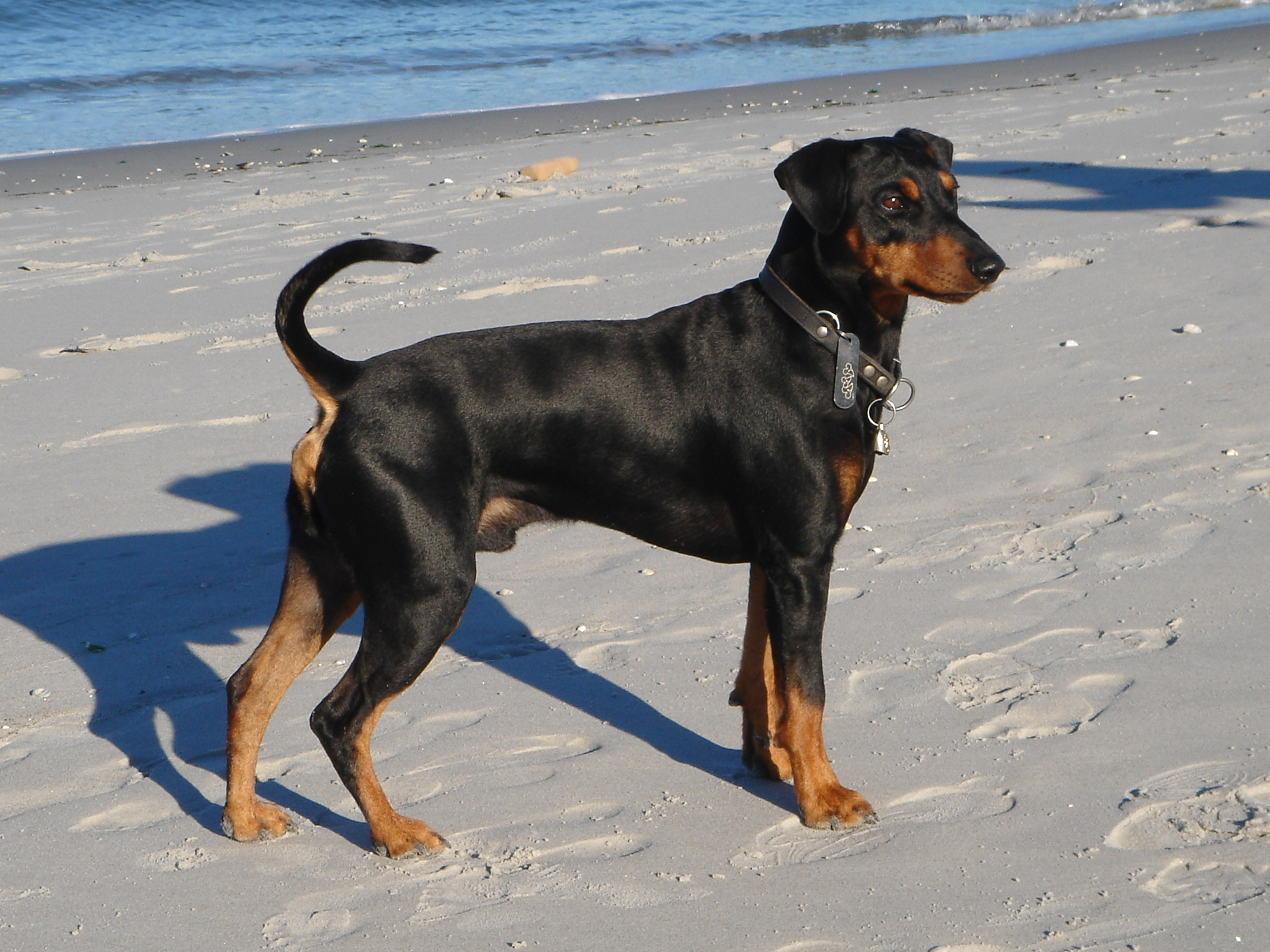
Black-and-tan dog

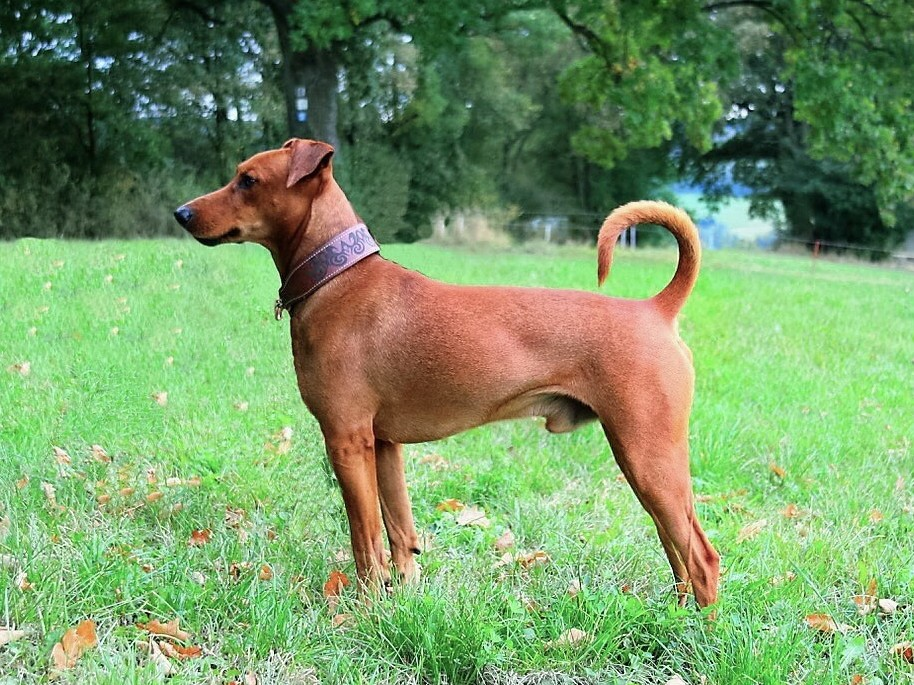
Deer-red dog

The origins of the German Pinscher are unknown. Dogs of this type, both rough-haired and smooth-haired, were traditionally kept as carriage dogs or as stable dogs, and so were sometimes known as Stallpinscher; they were capable ratters. Both types were known as Deutscher Pinscher, and came from the same lineage; rough-haired and smooth-haired puppies could occur in the same litter. The rough-haired Pinscher, which would later become the Standard Schnauzer, was also known as the Rattler.

The "smooth Pinscher" is mentioned by Heinrich Gottlieb Ludwig Reichenbach in 1836. In 1880 the Pinscher was recorded in the Deutschen Hundestammbuch of the Verein zur Veredelung der Hunderassen. In 1895 Ludwig Beckmann described five varieties of Pinscher – the rough- and smooth-haired Pinscher, the rough- and smooth-haired Miniature Pinscher, and the Affenpinscher; of the smooth-haired Pinscher he says that it is becoming less common, and is not often seen at dog shows. In 1895 a breed society, the Pinscher-Schnauzer-Klub, was established for both types, both rough- and smooth-haired.

The Pinscher almost disappeared in the years after the Second World War. It was reconstructed by Werner Jung from a single standard-sized animal and four unusually large Miniature Pinschers. After eight years in which no births were recorded, a litter was whelped in 1958. The Pinscher was definitively accepted by the Fédération Cynologique Internationale in 1955.

The Deutscher Pinscher is an endangered breed. In 2003 it was, with the Großspitz and the Mittelspitz, the 'endangered breed of the year' of the Gesellschaft zur Erhaltung alter und gefährdeter Haustierrassen; there were at that time 40 breeding bitches. In 2022 it was listed in category III, gefährdet ('endangered'), of the Rote Liste of that organisation. In each of the ten years from 2008 to 2017 the number of puppies whelped was between 350 and 450; in 2016 and 2017 there were just over 50 litters per year.

== Characteristics ==
The German Pinscher is of medium size, with weights for both dogs and bitches in the range 14–20 kg and a height at the withers between 45 and 50 cm. The coat is dense, short and smooth; it may be either black-and-tan or self-coloured red, this varying from a light stag-red to a dark reddish brown.
