= Ratonero Murciano =

Spanish breed of dog

- Origin: Spain
- Distribution: Region of Murcia
- Breed status: Not recognised as a breed by any major kennel club.

The Ratonero Murciano or Ratonero Murciano de Huerta is a Spanish breed of dog from the Region of Murcia. It was traditionally kept in Murcia as a mouse and rat hunter. It is claimed they descend from dogs introduced to the region by the Romans who imported them from Egypt. In 1997 a breeding program was established to save the breed; by 2009 the program was up to its third generation, with 80 breeding specimens and a DNA testing program.

The Ratonero Murciano is described as a compact, short-haired, active dog, well suited to its role as a rat hunter.
