= Austrian Pinscher =

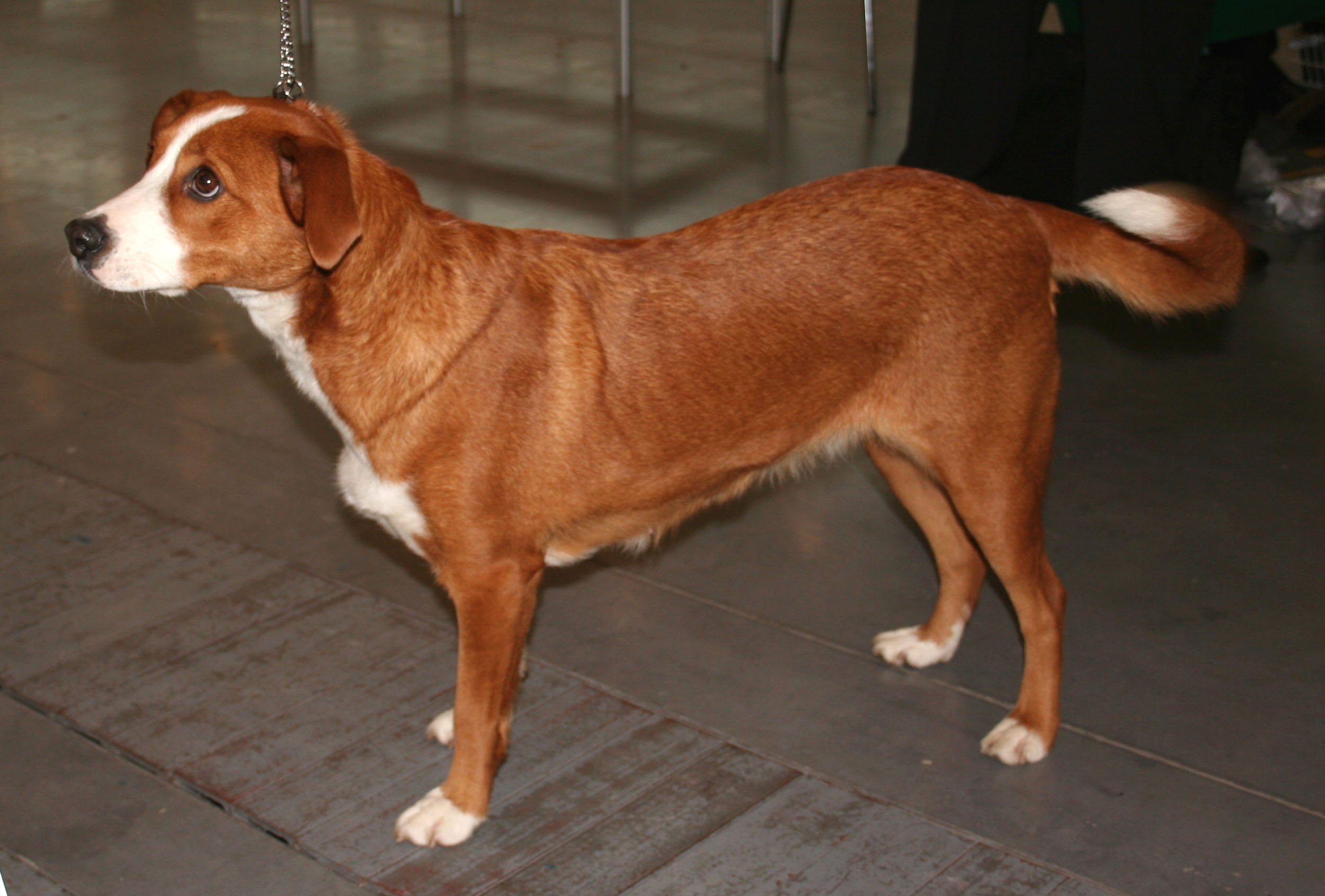
- Other names: Österreichischer Pinscher; Österreichischer Kurzhaarpinscher; Austrian Shorthaired Pinscher
- Origin: Austria
Traits
Height	Males	44–50 cm (17–20 in)
	Females	42–48 cm (17–19 in)
Kennel club standards
- Fédération Cynologique Internationale: standard

The Austrian Pinscher (Österreichischer Pinscher) is a medium-sized breed of pinscher-type dog from Austria, where dogs of the type were originally farm dogs, keeping barns free of rats and acting as home guards, livestock guardians, and drovers. The name originally given to the breed in 1928 was the Österreichischer Kurzhaarpinscher (Austrian Shorthaired Pinscher) to differentiate it from similarly named breeds, but today in its country of origin the breed is officially called the Österreichischer Pinscher, or Austrian Pinscher in English.

== Appearance ==
Like other farm dogs raised for work rather than for pets or show, the appearance can vary a great deal, although there is a definite breed standard. In general, the Austrian Pinscher is a normally proportioned strong and sturdy dog, 42–50 cm (17–20 in) at the withers. The breed has button ears and a head described as being shaped like a pear. The double coat is short to medium long, in a variety of yellow, red or black and tan colours, usually with white markings on the face, chest, feet and tip of the tail. The long tail is held high, and dogs of this breed should look lively and alert. They are heavier, more rugged and rectangular in appearance than the German Pinscher.

== History ==
The Austrian Shorthaired Pinscher was recognised as a breed for the first time in 1928, but the breed was developed from an old type of pinscher found on farms in the Austrian countryside, a mixture of German Pinschers and the local dogs.

At the end of the 19th century, the farm dogs began to die out when the work they did was no longer needed. In the early 20th century Emil Hauck, looking for an aboriginal dog type identified in 1843 by H. von Meyer as Canis palustris or dog of the marshes (a type of dog, not an actual species), found what he believed were some examples of similar dogs in the Austrian countryside. In 1921 he began serious breeding to revive and define the type of the breed, to separate them from other landrace pinschers of the area. The Austrian Kennel Club (Österreicher Kynologenverband) first recognised the breed as the Österreichischer Kurzhaarpinscher (translates in English as Austrian Shorthaired Pinscher) in 1928. The name was given to the breed to identify its place of origin as Austria (Österreich), and to differentiate it from the Schnauzer which at that time was called the Rough-haired Pinscher (rauhaariger Pinscher). After World War II, though, the breed almost vanished. In the 1970s only one registered dog of the breed remained, named Diokles of Angern. Breeding this dog with other dogs identified as of the old pinscher type in the area ("Landpinschern") has brought the breed back, although there are still only a small number of them.

Ark Austria (Arche Austria), an association for the preservation of endangered indigenous breeds, lists the Austrian Pinscher and states that it is highly vulnerable, with only 6 to 12 breeding animals, who are being carefully bred to preserve health and breed type.

The breed is recognised in its country of origin by the Österreischer Kynologenverband (ÖKV, Austrian Kennel Club) and internationally by the Fédération Cynologique Internationale in the Pinscher section of Group 2. It is also recognised by the United Kennel Club in the United States as the Austrian Pinscher as of 2006, in the Terrier Group, for its background as a rat hunter.

== Health ==
No data have been collected on the breed's health, but good health is a stated objective of the breed restoration breeding in Austria.

=== Temperament ===
The breed is described as "a pleasant companion" for rural and suburban areas. The breed standard describes the ideal Austrian Pinscher's temperament and character as playful, not inclined to be a hunter, and being an "incorruptible guard".
