= Danish–Swedish Farmdog =

Dansk–svensk gårdshund (Danish–Swedish Farmdog)
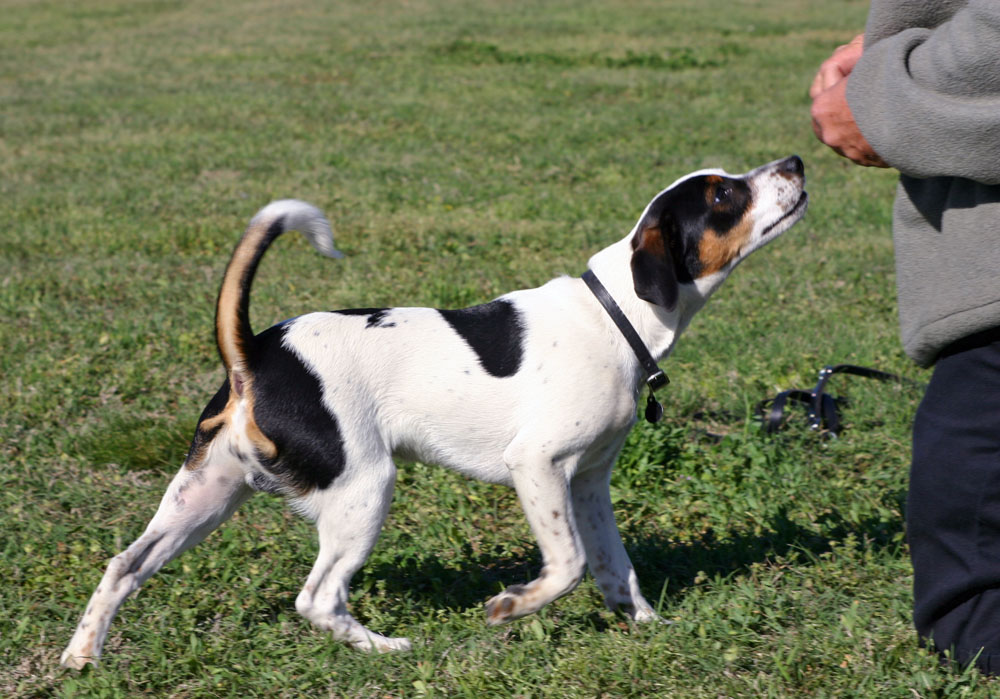
- Danish–Swedish Farmdog
- Other names: Scanian terrier Danish Pinscher
- Origin: Denmark and Sweden
Traits
Height	Males	32–39 cm (13–15 in)
	Females	30–37 cm (12–15 in)
- Coat: short and smooth
- Colour: predominately white
Kennel club standards
- Dansk Kennel Club: standard
- Fédération Cynologique Internationale: standard

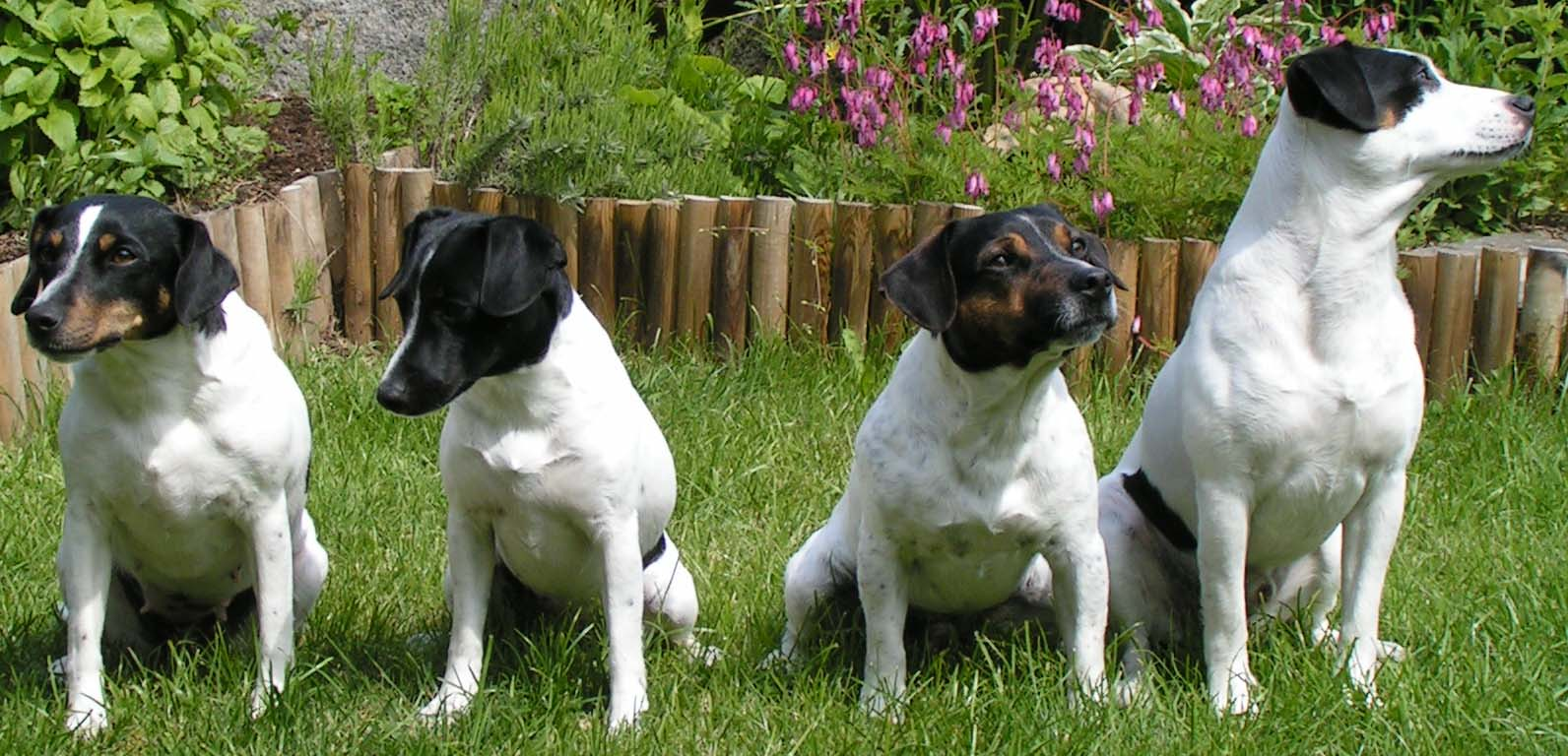
Four Danish–Swedish Farmdogs

Danish–Swedish Farmdog (Swedish: Dansk–svensk gårdshund, Danish: Dansk–svensk gårdhund), historically known as the Danish Pinscher, is a breed of dog that has its origin in Denmark and southern Sweden, but has become popular all over Scandinavia, serving as a multi-purpose dog breed.

== History ==
The Danish–Swedish Farmdog may have originated in Scania, in the region of Skåneland. The breed was used as a multi-purpose farm dog in Scandinavia for centuries, serving as a guard dog, rat catcher, hunting dog, and herder. The breed's population declined in the 1870s, as industrialization in Denmark led to their purpose becoming largely obsolete. The breed nearly became extinct by the 1980s. The Danish Kennel Club and the Swedish Kennel Club collaborated in saving the breed from extinction, and the Danish–Swedish Farmdog became a recognized breed in Denmark and Sweden in 1987. The breed appeared at the World Dog Show for the first time in 1989.

In 2010, the dog's breed club in the United States, called Danish–Swedish Farmdogs USA, made an application to AKC-FSS for recognition of the breed. In January 2011, the American Kennel Club (AKC) added the breed to its Foundation Stock Service. The breed was officially recognized by the AKC in 2025.

== Description ==
The FCI standard says that a Danish–Swedish Farmdog should be 30–39 centimeters in height with a compact body. The relation between withers height and body length should be 9 to 10. The head is rather small and triangular with a well-emphasized stop. The coat is hard, short and smooth in texture, with white as a dominating color, with one or several patches of different color combination. The tail could be long, half bobtail or bobtail.

== See also ==
- List of dog breeds
