= Miniature Pinscher =

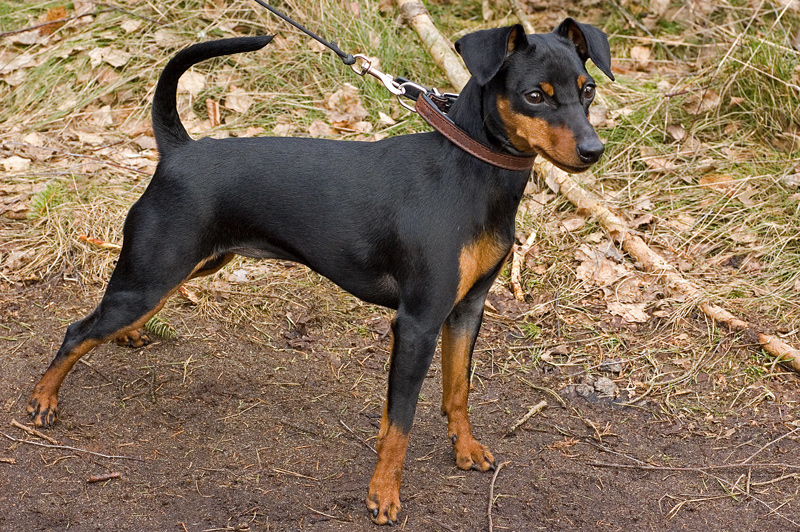
- Other names: Zwergpinscher
- Origin: Germany
Traits
- Height: 25–30 cm (10–12 in)
- Weight: 4–6 kg (9–13 lb)
Kennel club standards
- Verband für das Deutsche Hundewesen: standard
- Fédération Cynologique Internationale: standard

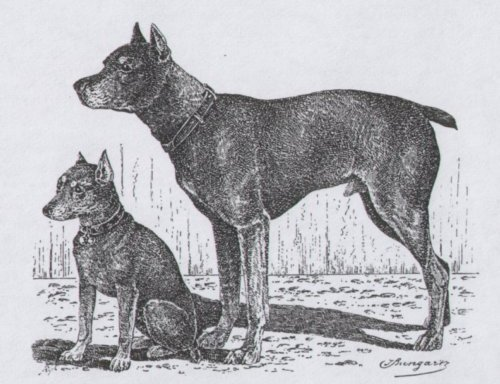
Drawing of a pinscher and a miniature pinscher by Jean Bungartz

The Miniature Pinscher or Zwergpinscher is a German breed of small dog of Pinscher type.

== History ==
The dogs were used traditionally to hunt mice, lizards, small birds, rabbits, pests and vermin and were hunting dogs. There is a drawing by Jean Bungartz, published in 1888 comparing the Miniature Pinscher to the German Pinscher.

The breed was fully accepted by the Fédération Cynologique Internationale in 1955.

Genetic research published in 2017 concluded that the Miniature Pinscher has shared ancestry with the Toy Manchester Terrier.

== Characteristics ==
The Miniature Pinscher is structurally a well-balanced, sturdy, compact, short-coupled, smooth-coated dog. It is naturally well groomed, vigorous, and alert. Characteristic traits include its hackney-like action, fearless animation, complete self-possession, and spirited presence. Its legs should be straight with no bending in or out. The breed is also known to be prone to separation anxiety.

It is a small dog: for both bitches and dogs, body weight is in the range 4 to 6 kg and height at the withers lies between 25 and 30 cm.

=== Coat and color ===
The coat is short and smooth, with no undercoat. Available colors include solid red, stag red, blue stag red, chocolate stag red, fawn stag red, as well as black, grey, chocolate, blue, and fawn with tan points or rust points. For showing in the United States, the AKC disqualifies all colors but the solid or stag red and the black or chocolate with rust points. The Pinscher-Schnauzer Club, which maintains the standard for showing in Germany, has the same restrictions. In the UK, blue with rust points is allowed in the show ring.

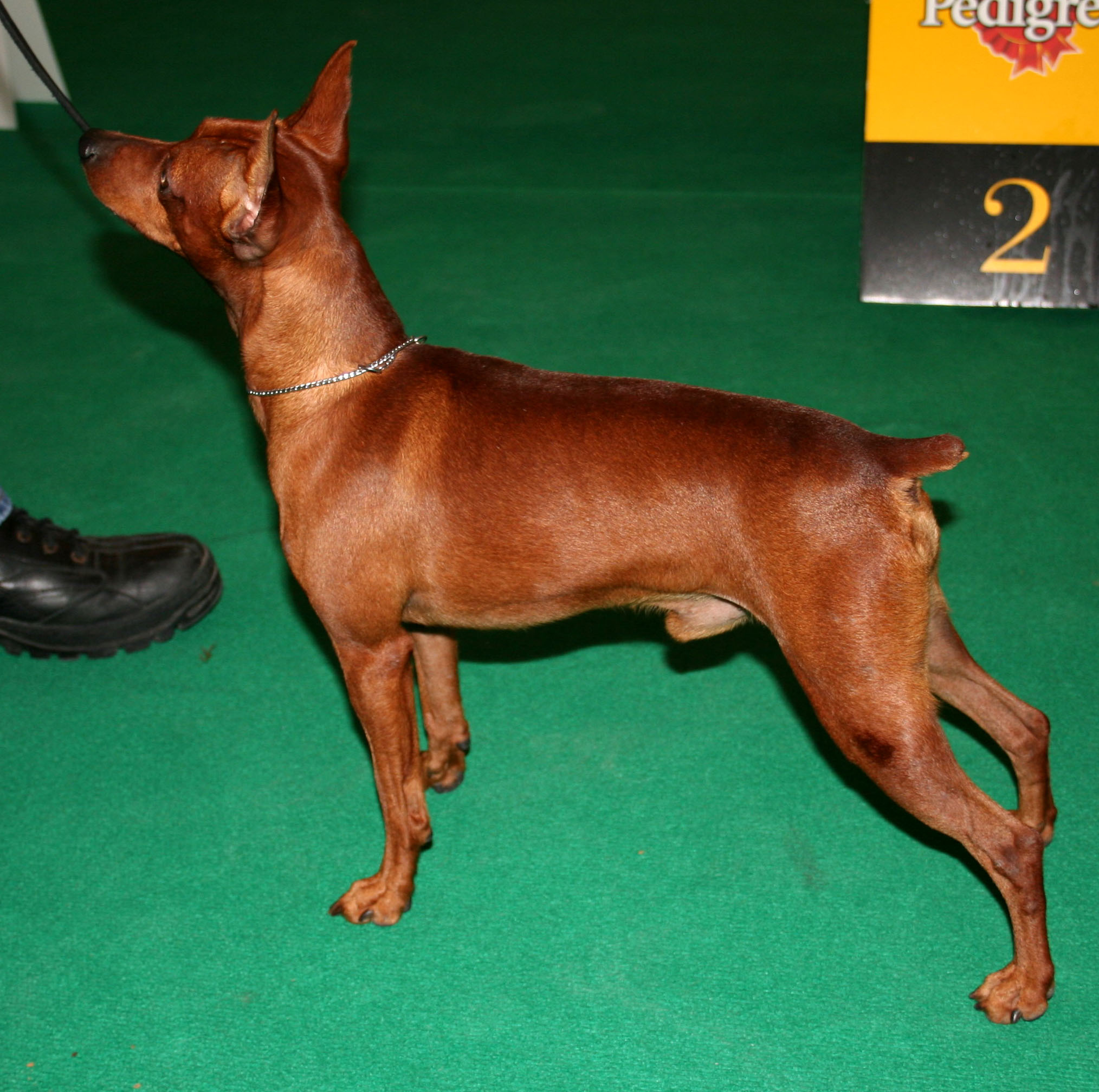
At a dog show

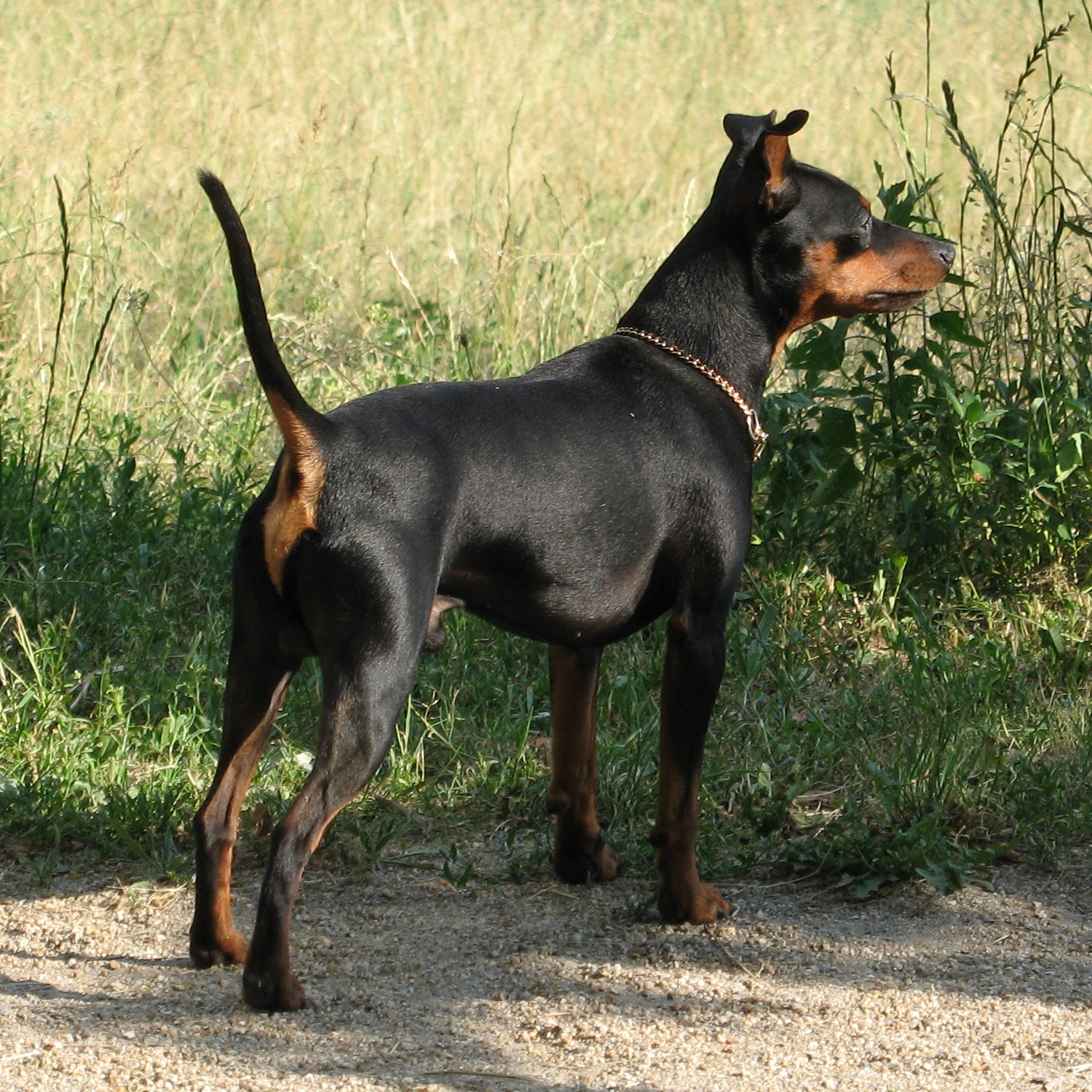
The black

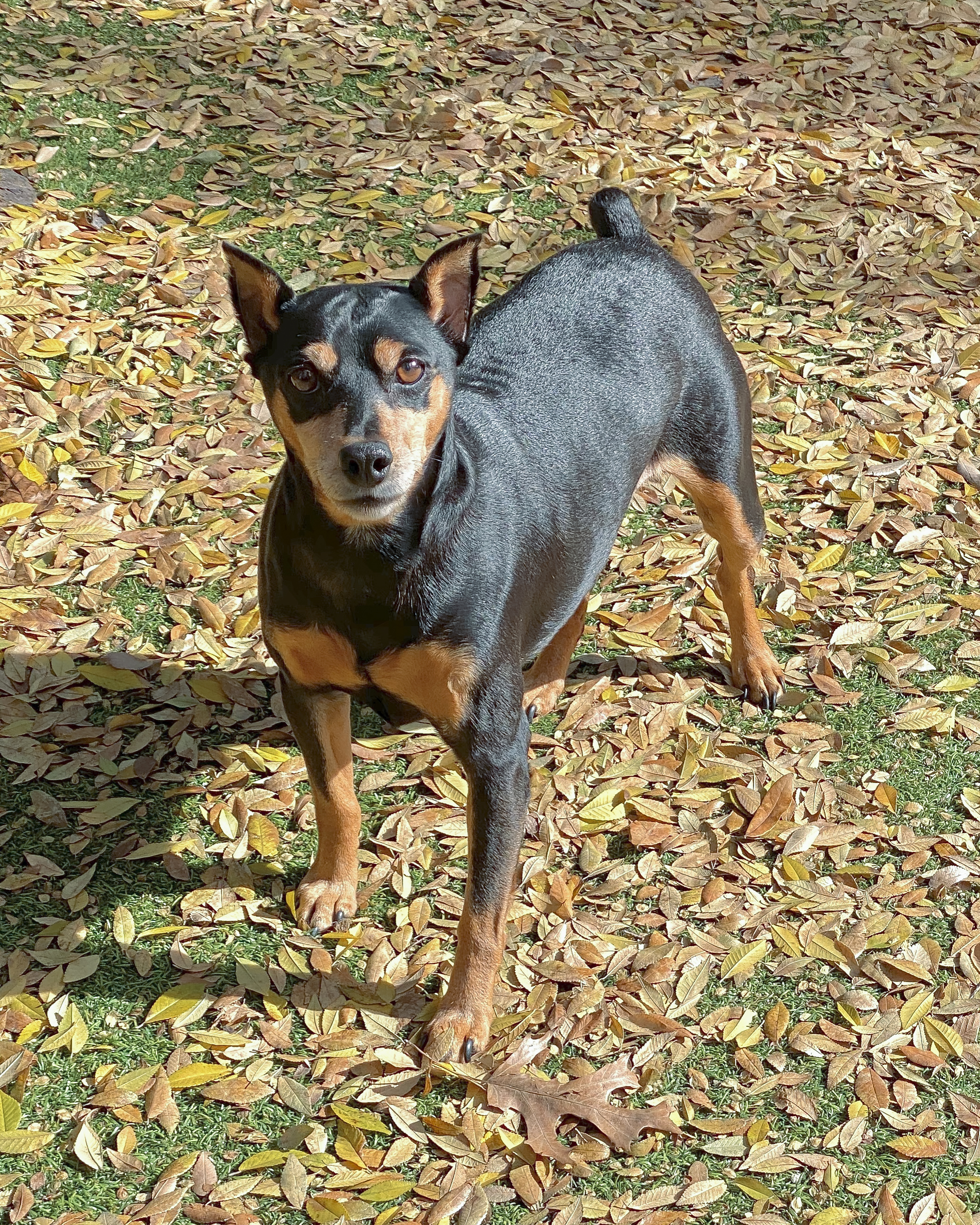
The brown and black coat

== Health ==
A 2024 UK study found a life expectancy of 13.7 years for the breed compared to an average of 12.7 for purebreeds and 12 for crossbreeds. A 2024 Italian study found a life expectancy of 11 years for the breed compared to 10 years overall.
