= Carriage dog =

Dogs bred to trot alongside carriages

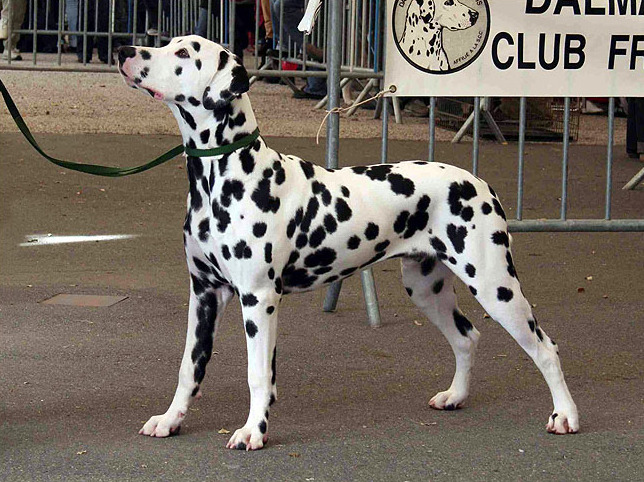
The Dalmatian dog is a notable breed of carriage dog.

A carriage dog or coach dog is a type of dog bred and trained to trot alongside carriages to protect the occupants from banditry or other interference. They were usually owned and used by the wealthy or traders and merchants. The dogs were trained to attack highwaymen, giving the humans time to respond to the robbers.

When the Dalmatian breed was introduced to England in the 18th century, they quickly became the carriage-dog breed of choice. Because of this, "carriage dog" became synonymous with "Dalmatian". The British Carriage Dog Society exists to preserve "the working heritage of the Dalmatian as a coaching dog." Previously any breed with long legs and some weight in the body had been used.

The number of dogs accompanying any coach could be an indicator of the occupants' wealth or status: some well-situated people would run six or eight dogs.

Coach dogs were kennelled in the stables, and bonded with the horses as pups. A more civic usage was as fire-engine escorts, helping to clear the way in crowded streets as well as guarding the very expensive horses in their stables.

With the demise of horse-drawn transport, the need for the dogs declined, and they became largely ceremonial assets, but were often repurposed as static house and barn guard dogs. Today carriage dogs are valued as loyal pets and companions.
