= Verband für das Deutsche Hundewesen =

German kennel club

- Formation: 11 June 1949; 76 years ago
- Type: Kennel club
- Legal status: Active
- Location: Dortmund, Germany
- Region served: Germany
- Official language: German
- Website: vdh.de

Verband für das Deutsche Hundewesen (VDH) is a kennel club that represents Germany in the international federation Fédération Cynologique Internationale. Founded on 11 June 1949, it is headquartered in Dortmund.

As the country-wide controlling body, VDH represents 176 member organizations, such as the German Dog Sports Association and the German Association of Working Dog Sports Clubs, with more than 650,000 members, and covering over 250 different breeds of dog.
