= Vulnerable dog breeds of the United Kingdom =

Vulnerable Native Dog Breeds

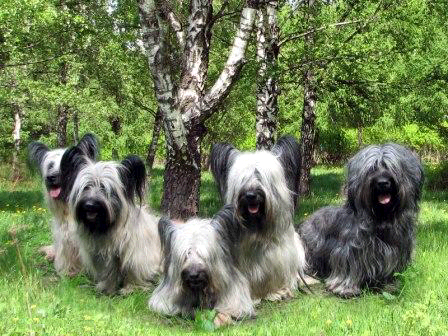
There were only 37 Skye Terrier puppies registered with the Kennel Club in 2010

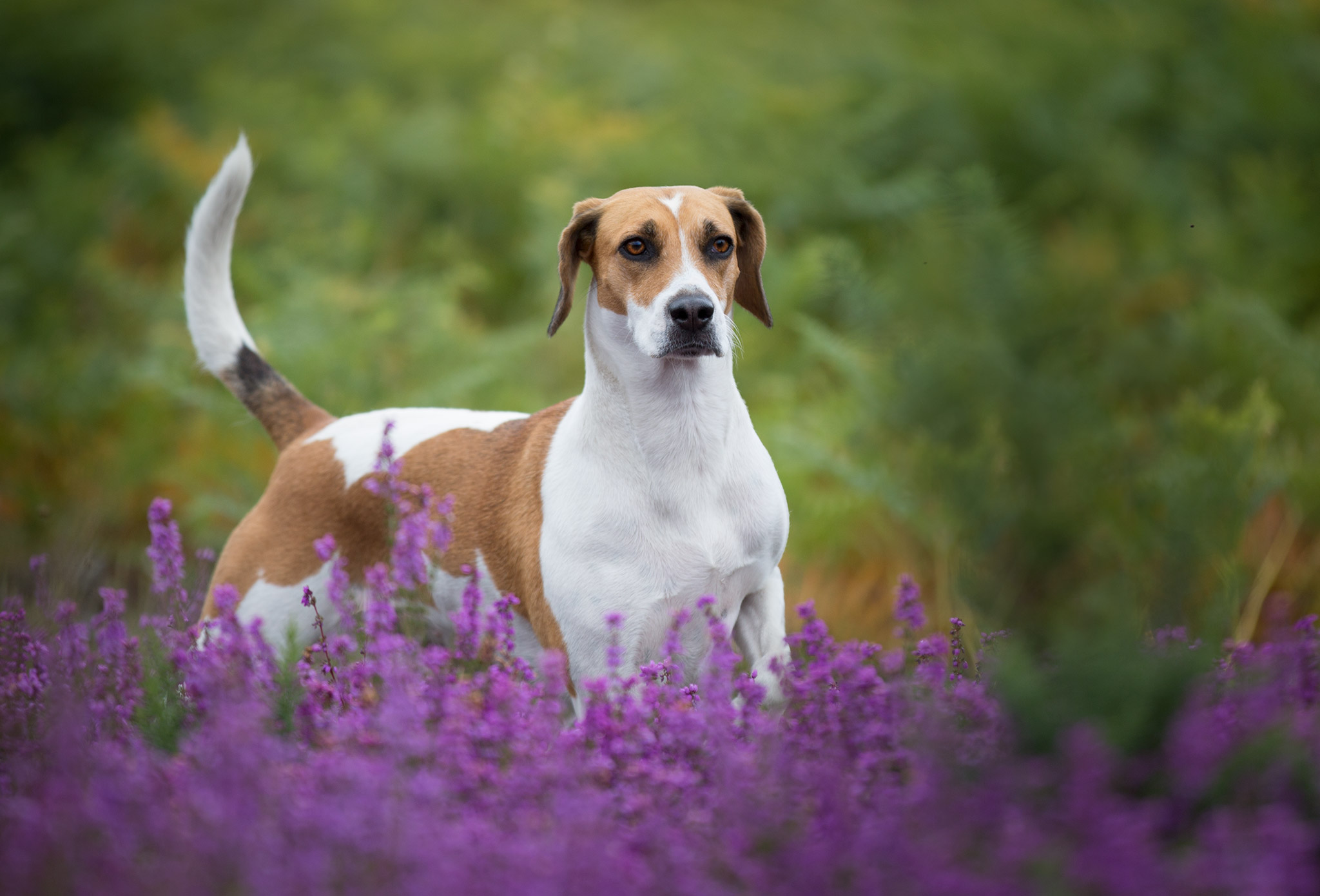
There are only 60 KC registered Harriers in the UK in 2023

Vulnerable Native Breeds are a group of dog breeds originating in the United Kingdom and Ireland, and identified by The Kennel Club (KC) as having annual registration numbers of 300 puppies or fewer within the UK. The KC identified its need for such a list in June 2003, with research it conducted to identify the extent of the vulnerability and viability of each breed. It was a joint project, with the KC working with the British and Irish Native Breeds Trust, later to be known simply as the Native Dog Breeds Trust. The breeds on the list have been promoted at events such as Discover Dogs and Crufts, and by asking that owners of these breeds mate their dogs rather than having them spayed.

The majority of the list comes from the Terrier Group, a group mostly derived from breeds with backgrounds in the British Isles. The most marked drop in popularity is that of the Sealyham Terrier, which registered 1,084 breeds in 1938, but by 2004 was registering only sixty dogs a year. In October 2011, British magazine Country Life highlighted the breed on its front cover, with the heading "SOS: Save our Sealyhams," and launched a campaign to save the breed. The Otterhound, popular during the time of Henry VIII, has registration numbers of less than a thousand world wide.

The list was originally compiled in January 2006, and included 28 breeds. Later in 2006, the Miniature Bull Terrier was added. In 2007, after consultation with the breed clubs involved, the Bloodhound, Gordon Setter and King Charles Spaniel were re-classed as "Viable" rather than vulnerable. The English Setter is the newest addition to the list, having been added for the first time in 2012. However, during 2012 the number of English Setter puppies registered increased to 314, so the breed was moved to the Kennel Club's "At Watch" list, which is for breeds with registrations from 300-450. Breeds on the "At Watch" list included in 2013 the English Setter, the Old English Sheepdog, the Irish Terrier, the Irish Wolfhound, the Welsh Springer Spaniel, the Pembroke Welsh Corgi, and the Welsh Terrier.

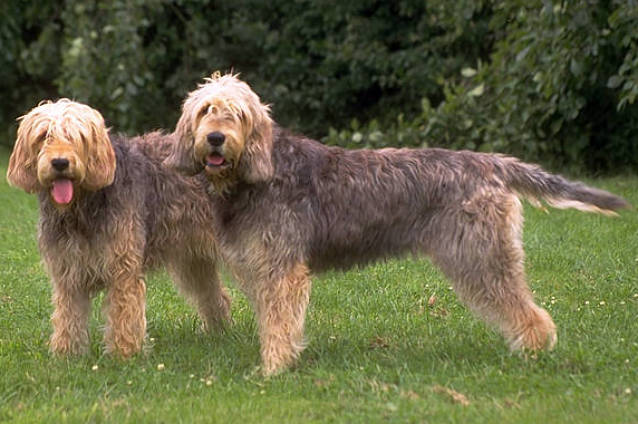
The Otterhound

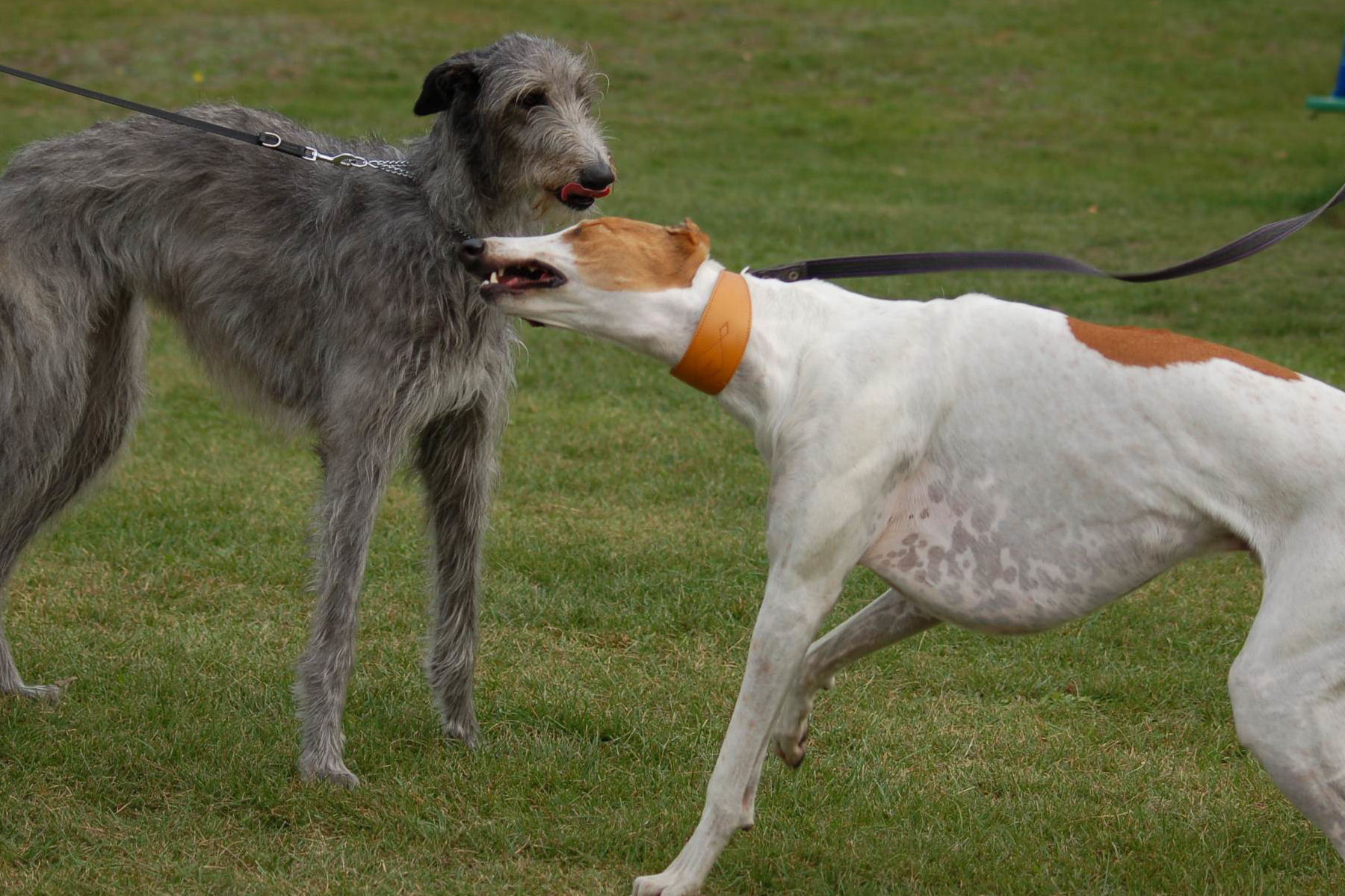
A Scottish Deerhound, and a Greyhound, two sighthounds on the list

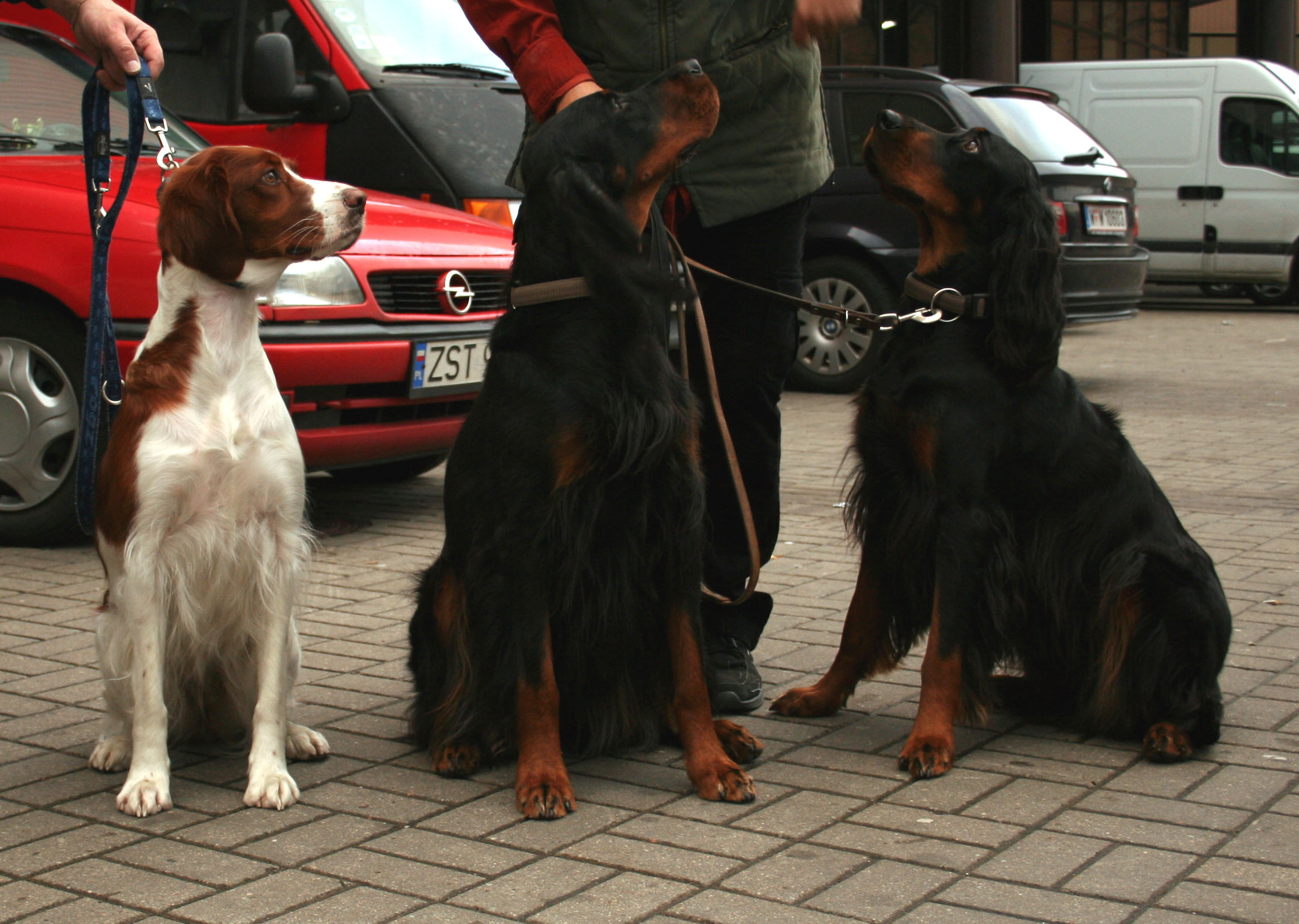
An Irish Red and White Setter, and two Gordon Setters

== Listed breeds ==
Key

*Former vulnerable breeds now viable breeds
**Former vulnerable breeds now watch list
***Former vulnerable breed

Table

Breed^{[A]}	Group	2002 Registrations	2005 Registrations	2011 Registrations	2012 Registrations	2013 Registrations	Ref
Bloodhound*	Hound Group	80	104	59	50	51	
Bull Terrier (Miniature)	Terrier Group	278	275	216	192	161	
Collie (Smooth)	Pastoral Group	85	72	75	88	82	
Dandie Dinmont Terrier	Terrier Group	148	149	98	120	105	
English Setter**	Gundog Group	568	450	234	314	326	
English Toy Terrier (Black and Tan)	Toy Group	56	103	95	126	115	
Foxhound	Hound Group		5	9	0	11	
Fox Terrier (Smooth)	Terrier Group	167	212	137	94	122	
Glen of Imaal Terrier	Terrier Group	48	45	67	57	55	
Gordon Setter*	Gundog Group	250	309	306		273	
Greyhound	Hound Group	24	49	14	30	40	
Harrier	Houng Group			12	38	9	
Irish Red and White Setter	Gundog Group	99	120	119	89	82	
Irish Terrier**	Terrier Group	198	270	277	306	362	
Kerry Blue Terrier	Terrier Group	244	277	212	210	169	
King Charles Spaniel*	Toy Group	150	193	180	217	169	
Lakeland Terrier	Terrier Group	269	330	247	208	221	
Lancashire Heeler	Pastoral Group	125	166	98	104	103	
Manchester Terrier	Terrier Group	86	140	152	124	198	
Mastiff (English)	Working Group		476	173	140	139	
Norwich Terrier	Terrier Group	153	131	158	170	194	
Otterhound	Hound Group	54	50	38	37	42	
Retriever (Curly Coated)	Gundog Group	79	82	62	71	118	
Scottish Deerhound	Hound Group	231	264	237	260	236	
Sealyham Terrier	Terrier Group	58	58	63	76	68	
Skye Terrier	Terrier Group	59	30	44	42	17	
Soft Coated Wheaten Terrier***	Terrier Group	277	321	433		372	
Spaniel (Clumber)	Gundog Group	170	192	271	151	247	
Spaniel (Field)	Gundog Group	84	86	46	47	29	
Spaniel (Irish Water)	Gundog Group	145	106	101	148	101	
Spaniel (Sussex)	Gundog Group	82	77	52	74	55	
Welsh Corgi (Cardigan)	Pastoral Group	56	77	108	94	102	
Welsh Terrier**	Terrier Group	270	326	415	352	447	

== Notes ==
- A The breeds are listed by their names official registration names with the Kennel Club.
