= Glen of Imaal Terrier =

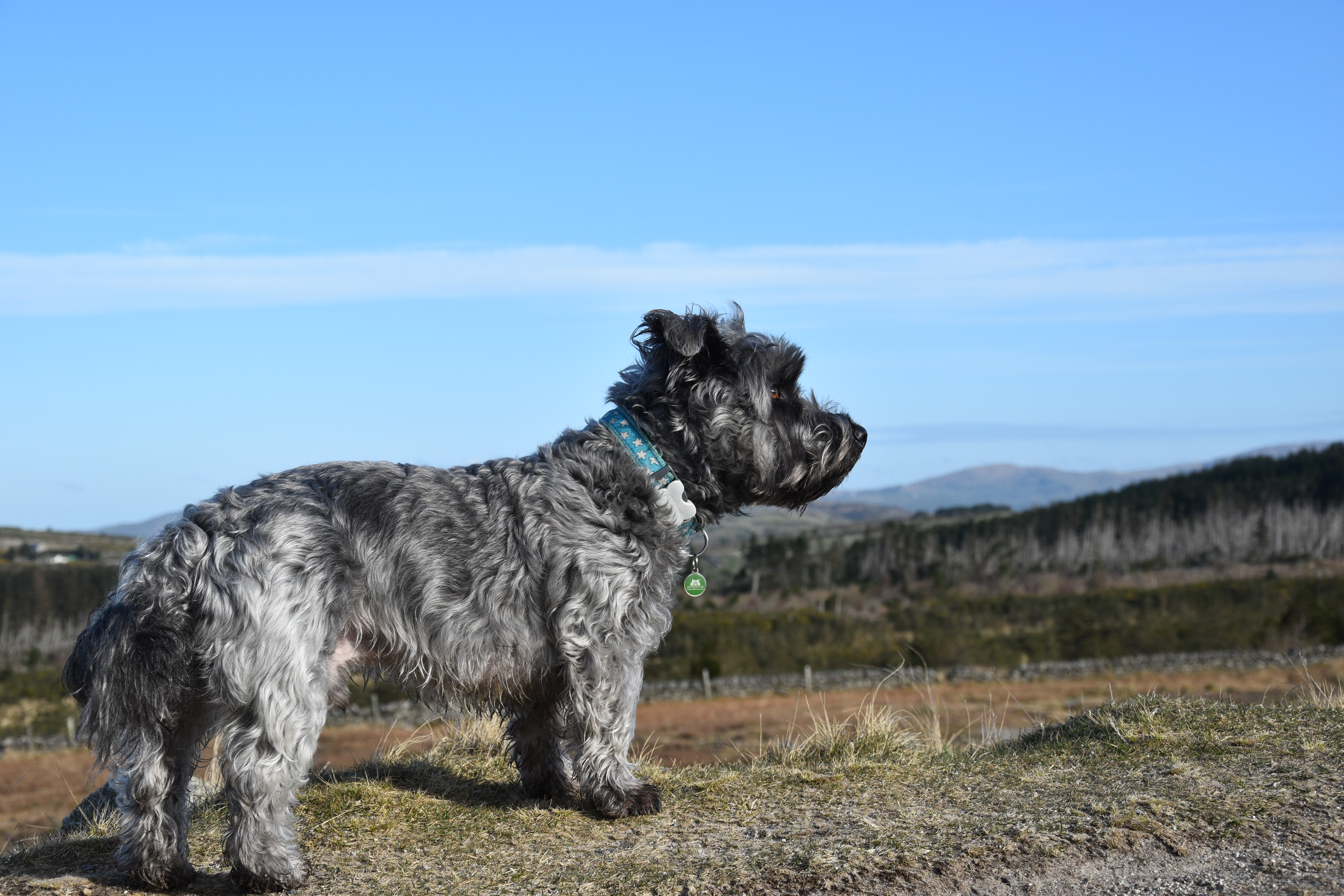
- An adult blue brindle Glen of Imaal Terrier
- Other names: Irish Glenn of Imaal Terrier, Wicklow Terrier
- Common nicknames: Glen, Glennie
- Origin: Ireland
Kennel club standards
- Irish Kennel Club: standard
- The Kennel Club: standard
- Fédération Cynologique Internationale: standard

The Glen of Imaal Terrier (Irish: Brocaire Uí Mháil) is a rare Irish dog breed from County Wicklow, Ireland, and one of four original Irish terrier breeds native to Ireland. It is sometimes called the Irish Glen of Imaal Terrier or the Wicklow Terrier, and the name of the breed is often shortened by fanciers to just Glen.

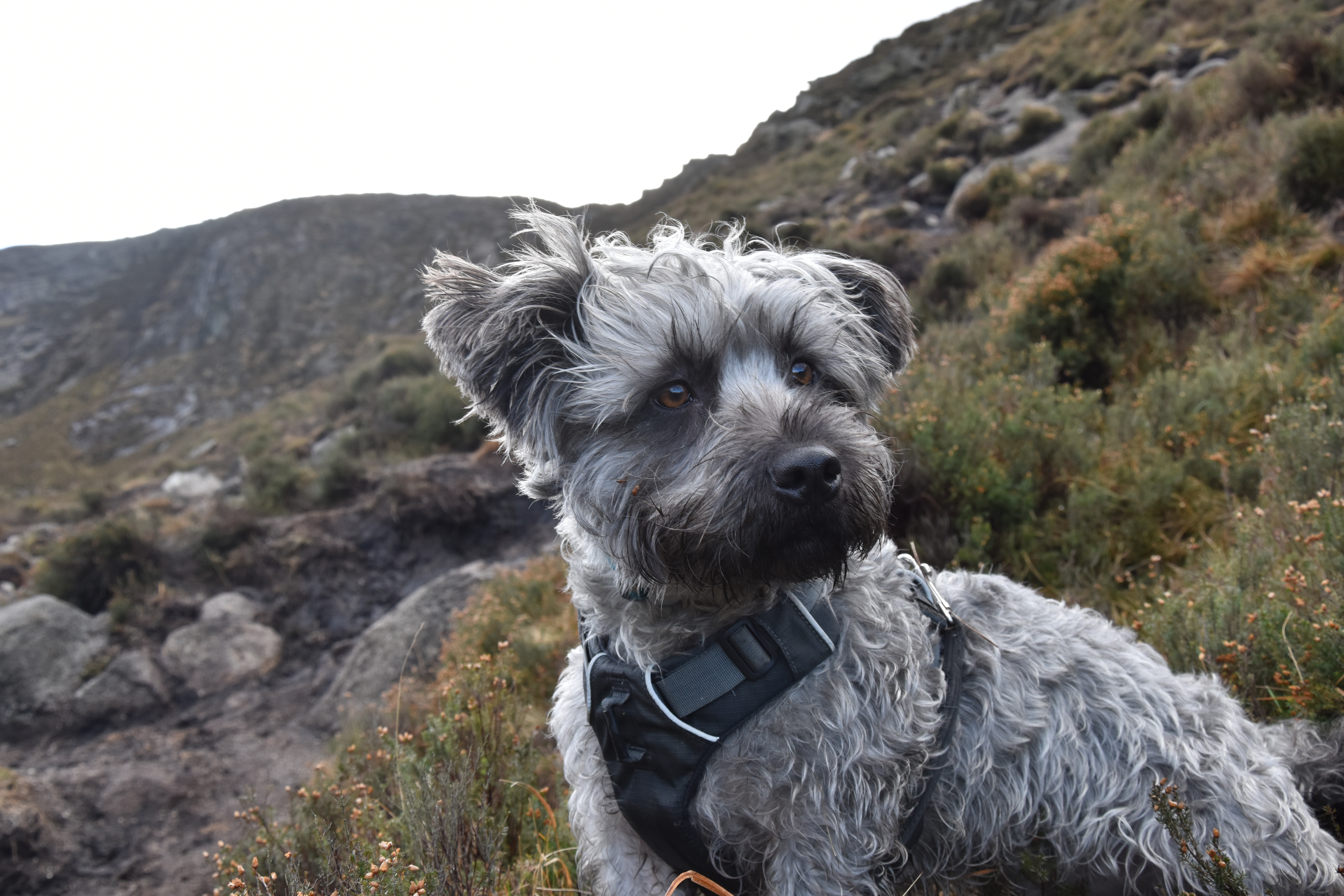
Glen of Imaal Terrier sitting resting in the Mourne Mountains, Northern Ireland

It is bred for hunting vermin and general farm work, the Glen is known for its strength, low stature, and unusually quiet nature for a terrier. The breed was recognised first by the Irish Kennel Club in 1934 and most recently by the American Kennel Club in 2004. The Canadian Kennel Club voted to fully recognise Glens in 2017 after the breed spent years on the Miscellaneous list; approval by Agriculture Canada is pending.

Once nearly extinct, it was revived in the 20th century and is now still considered to be one of the rarest breeds of dog (in the US, living registered animals number in the hundreds) and the least-known Irish terrier breed. It is considered a vulnerable native breed by the UK's Kennel Club, which tracks breeds in which fewer than 300 puppies are registered each year. The current global Glen population size is estimated at 3100.

== Appearance ==
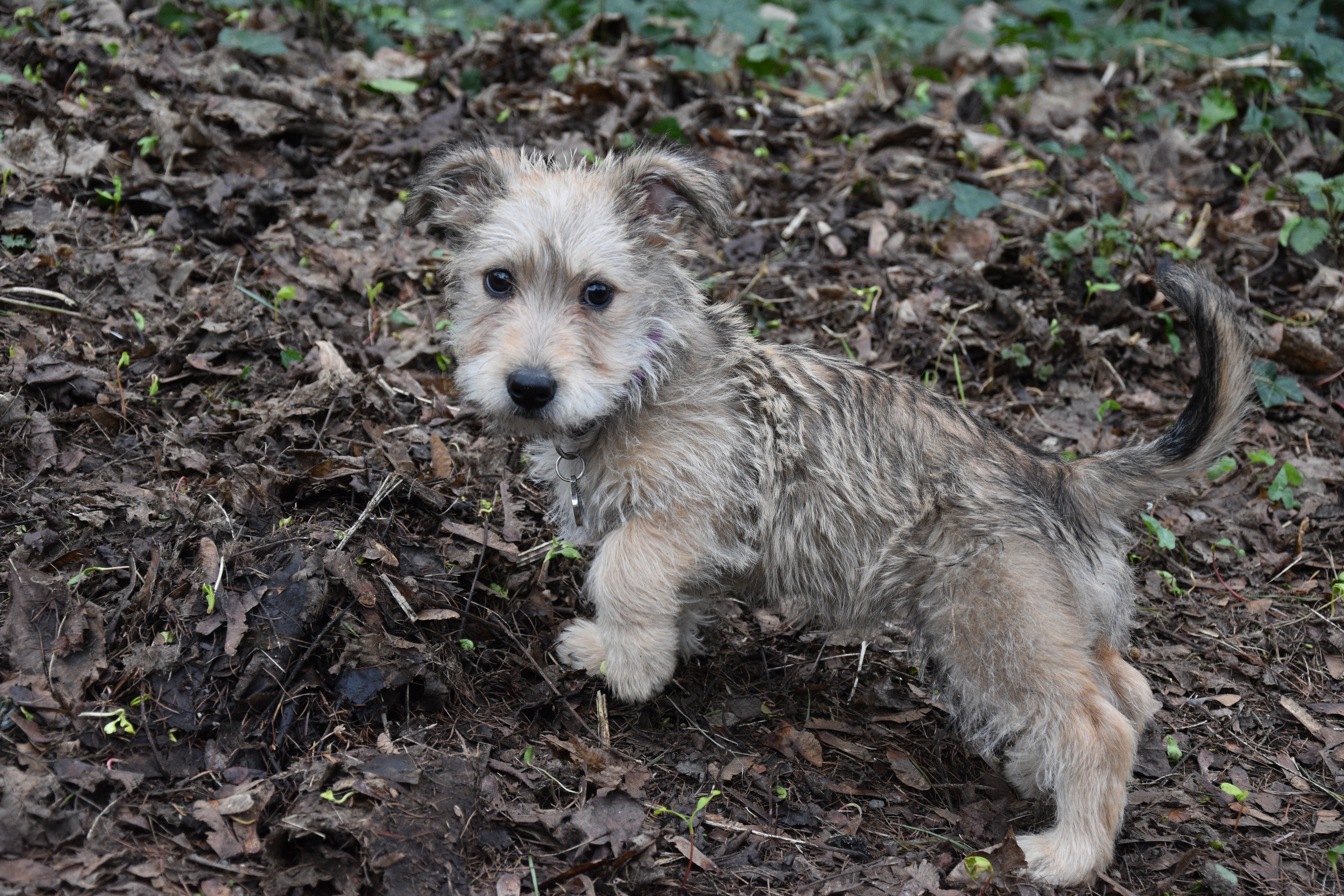
12 Week old female wheaten Glen of Imaal Terrier puppy with black highlights in coat

A "big dog on short legs," the Glen of Imaal Terrier is an achondroplastic dwarf breed. It is more substantial than might be expected from photographs; a typical adult Glen weighs about 36 pounds and stands 14" tall at the withers. The AKC breed standard specifies a height of 12" to 14" and a weight of "approximately" 35 pounds for males and "somewhat less" for females, with a length-to-height ratio of 5:3. Many champion Glens are larger than breed standard, with some individuals exceeding 40 or even 45 pounds. With three growth stages, a Glen can take up to four years to reach full maturity.

Glens have a large head, with rose or half-prick ears; short, bowed legs; and a straight topline that rises slightly toward the tail. The shoulders, chest, and hips are sturdy and muscular (the AKC breed standard specifies an impression of "maximum substance for size") and the front feet are turned out. The breed is considered unrefined, with antique features that were common in early terriers but which have since fallen out of favor with fanciers and breeders.

On their back, Glens have a unique double coat that is wiry with a soft undercoat. The head, sides, and legs have only the softer coat, which typically develops a degree of waviness. The color of the coat may be wheaten or blue (the latter usually with brindling), with both wheaten and blue encompassing a range of shades. Other colorings do occasionally occur in Glens (including a mixture of wheaten and blue referred to as "grizzle" and a "blue and tan" that is blue on top with wheaten furnishings) but these rare variations, while not disqualifications, are not favored by fanciers.

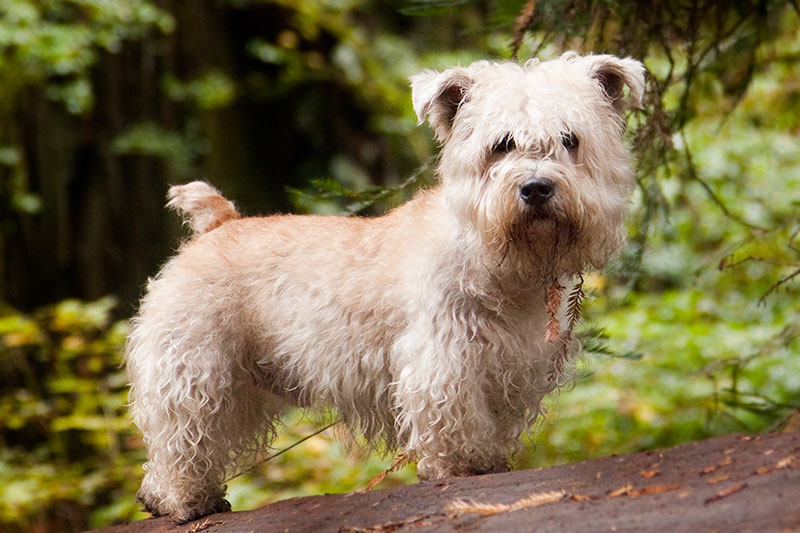
Wheaten Glen of Imaal Terrier

Wheaten Glen of Imaal puppies often have black highlights in their fur, and when young may show a "dorsal stripe" of darker fur down the middle of their backs, but this usually does not appear in their adult coat.

The Glen of Imaal terrier does not molt or shed much, and needs to be brushed or combed every week or two to keep the soft coat in good condition and free of matting. It is also typical to strip excess hair from the hard coat two to four times per year; this "dead" hair pulls out easily and painlessly with the proper tools.

Although some extra grooming is needed for showing (for example, the light-colored soft undercoat is often "carded" from the back to enhance the color of the darker wiry coat), the Glen is intended to have a "rough and ready" appearance, and show grooming requires less effort than in many other breeds. Glens should look tidy but natural, never manicured or clipped, in the conformation ring.

Historically, the breed's tail was typically docked to a length just sufficient to serve as a handhold for pulling the dog out of a badger hole. Docking is still standard in the United States, though some breeders have stopped doing it, and an intact tail is not a fault in AKC conformation showing. Many countries, however, ban docking for showing completely. Ireland has banned showing of dogs whose tails were docked on or after 6 March 2014 (the procedure is also itself illegal with very limited exceptions). In the UK, working terriers can still be shown with docked tails, but dogs kept as pets cannot.

== Health ==
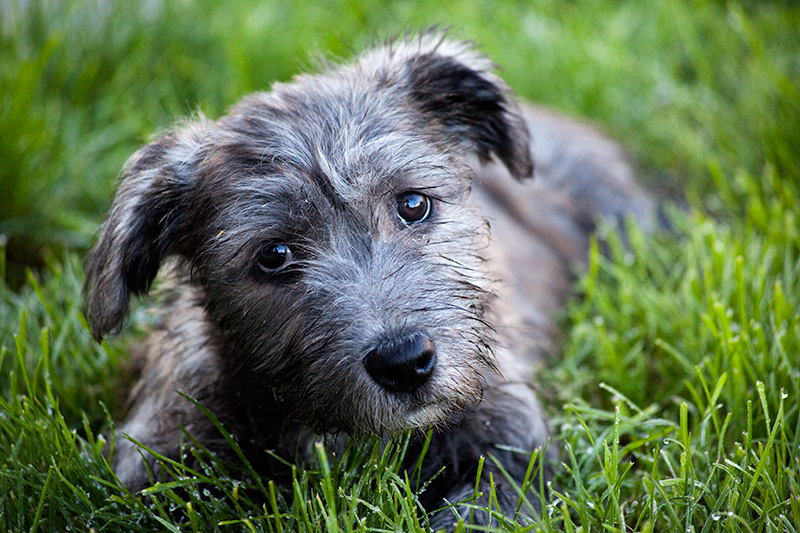
Blue brindle Glen of Imaal Terrier puppy

A genetic test is available for progressive retinal atrophy (type crd3), a congenital disorder that gradually results in blindness beginning at about five years of age. As blindness from this cause did not become apparent until well into the breeding years, it was difficult to breed out this trait before the advent of the test. Completely eliminating the defective gene will be tricky even now, as breeding only clear-to-clear would severely restrict choices in an already small gene pool. It is straightforward, however, to produce litters that will never be affected by this type of PRA, even though some individuals in the litter may carry the gene. (Because the trait is recessive, animals with only one copy of the defective gene do not develop PRA, and it is necessary only that one parent be clear to achieve this.) Responsible breeders use the test to plan PRA-free litters and continue to test their animals' eyes annually to validate the test and to monitor for other eye problems.

Heart problems are virtually nonexistent in the breed. Some Glen of Imaal Terriers suffer from allergies and skin itching, especially on paws, the typical problem with paws is redness, itching and sores during spells of wet weather. The Glen is not generally affected by the back problems common in certain other long-backed breeds. Hip dysplasia, though occasionally seen, is usually mild, and does not often result in lameness due to the breed's typically muscular build. Responsible breeders use OFA or PennHIP evaluations to ensure that their breeding stock's hips are healthy.

Because they are front-heavy and achondroplastic, young Glens are particularly susceptible to growth plate injuries that can significantly affect the development of front leg bones. Owners are advised to discourage their Glens from jumping off sofas, chairs, and beds until at least a year of age and to consult a veterinarian at the first sign of limping.

After the age of 12 months, Glens generally do best on a diet lower in protein than other breeds.

== Temperament and behavior ==
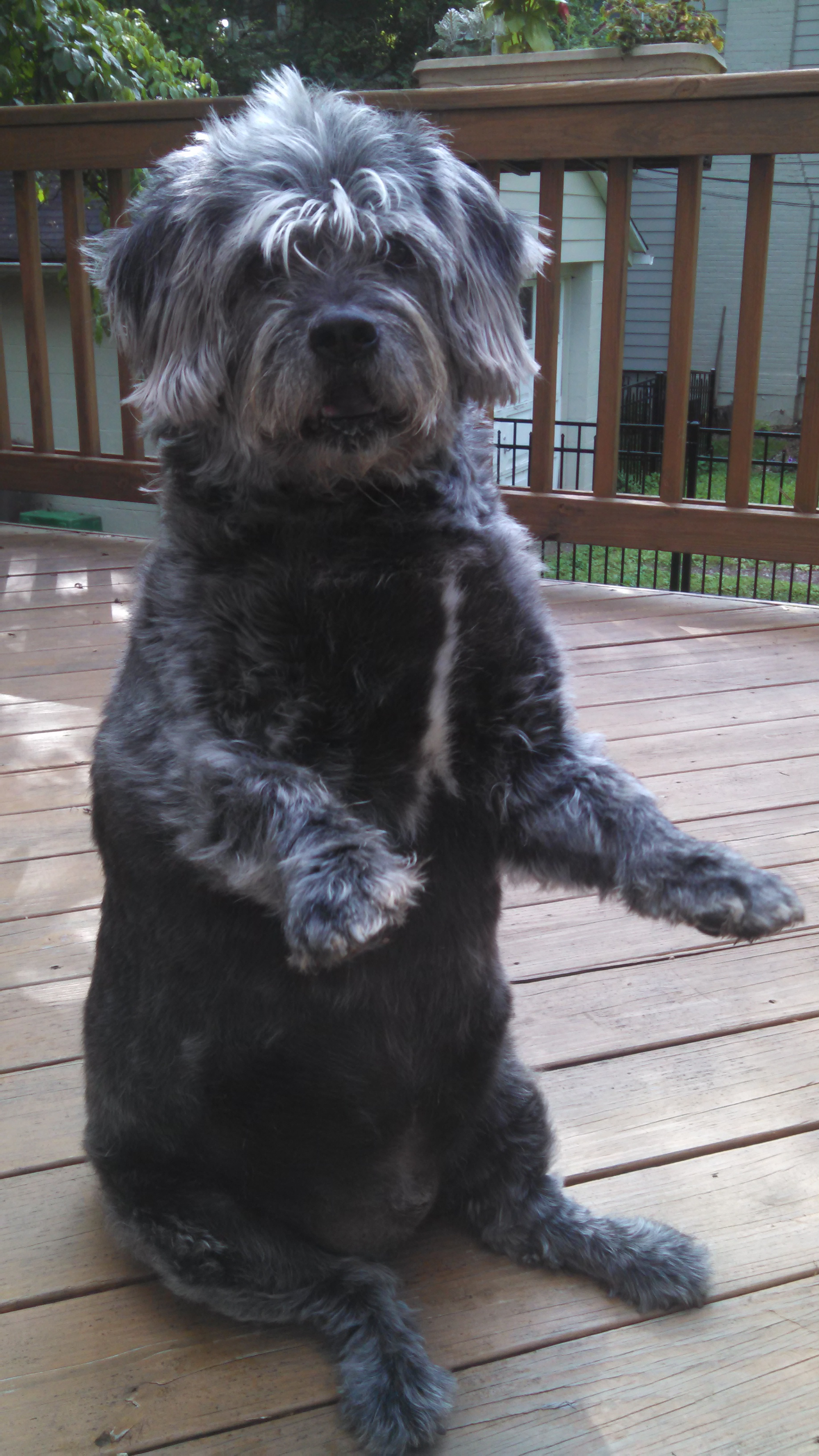
Glen of Imaal terrier demonstrating the "Glen sit".

Glen of Imaal terriers can be energetic and tenacious, but they tend to be more even-tempered, more easygoing, and less vocal than most other terriers. While they love activity, they are not demanding, and are happy to relax by their owner's side.

Their bark is deep and authoritative, like that of a much larger dog, and they are said to be good watch dogs.

The "Glen sit," in which the dog sits on its hind end and holds its entire body vertical, is a posture not commonly seen in other breeds.

As terriers, Glens can have a stubborn streak, but they are intelligent, learn quickly, and socialize easily. They are typically fearless and loyal, and are superb with people, including children. However, some can be dog-aggressive, especially when provoked.

By maturity, most Glens develop a robust prey drive and will readily go for vermin such as rats, so they need to be well-socialized with other animals when young—particularly with small household pets that they might mistake for quarry, such as cats and rabbits.

Glens often do well at Earthdog trials, Barn Hunt, and in agility. Although not typically strong swimmers due to their short legs and dense body, some Glens can work in water, and others have been trained to herd and drive sheep and cattle.

== Relationship to other breeds ==
Though the exact origin of the Glen of Imaal Terrier is lost to history, some say that the breed may be related to the Soft-Coated Wheaten Terrier, another Irish terrier breed (in fact, some sources claim all Irish terrier breeds to be derived from the Soft-Coated Wheaten) and/or the Kerry Blue Terrier. The "low-slung hounds" in the Glen's heritage are sometimes held to be forerunners of the PBGV and the source of the dwarfism. Though the Glen bears a passing resemblance to Scotland's Dandie Dinmont terrier, and even comes in two colors similar to the Dandie's "mustard" and "pepper," it does not seem to be particularly closely related to that breed.

DNA analysis indicates that the Glen of Imaal Terrier is more closely related to the mastiff-type dogs than it is to the terriers. The researchers noted that the Glen of Imaal Terrier was one of the breeds where genetic assignments conflict with phenotypic/functional designations.

== See also ==
- List of dog breeds
