= Teastas Mor =

Former hunting dog certification in Ireland

- Purpose: Determining gameness
- Year terminated: 1968; 58 years ago
- Restrictions on attempts: Single attempt
- Regions: Republic of Ireland
- Fee: Free

Teastas Mor was a certificate of gameness issued to a dog by the Irish Kennel Club.

Strict Irish Kennel Club rules governed the Teastas Mor (certificate of gameness). It was considered that the discipline ensured contests between dog and badger were fair. In the past, to become an Irish Kennel Club terrier champion, it was necessary for a terrier to be in possession of a Teastas Mor. Soft Coated Wheaten Terrier, Irish Terrier (a.k.a. Irish Red Terriers) and Kerry Blue Terrier (a.k.a. Irish Blue Terriers) were the principal breeds used. These continued until the kennel ceased to license trials in 1968.

== Rules ==
1. The trials must be conducted strictly within the law and are restricted to dogs and bitches which have not already qualified for the Teastas Mor certificate.

2. a) A veterinary surgeon must be in attendance at the trial. Under no circumstances may a trial take place without one, and his name and address must be recorded on the application for a licence and on the licence issued by the Kennel Club.

2. b) In the event of any serious injury occurring to any dog or badger, the animal at the discretion of the Veterinary Surgeon shall be humanely and expeditiously destroyed.

3. The trial of any dog must be in natural setts. Under no circumstances may tests be carried out in artificial setts. A dog may not be tried more than twice in any trial.

4. Once a badger is "drawn" (pulled out of the ground), it must not be released or returned to the earth until the conclusion of the trials.

5. Badger in captivity shall not be used for tests or training.

6. Sounders (dogs making a particular sound which means "I have found it.") are expected to go to the ground with alacrity. When a sounder reports the presence of game with a "full and sustained tongue", a reasonable time shall be allowed before men with shovels begin to dig. If the sounder records persistently from one section of the sett, digging shall commence under the direction of the judges.

7. The badger shall be drawn by a strong terrier, with the assistance if necessary, and the size of the badger and underground conditions noted by the judges.

8. If a sett is apparently unoccupied, several terriers may be run through it and their eagerness to search noted.

9. With regards to strong terriers, the Teastas Mor is to be awarded to the terrier showing gameness in attacking badgers. Five minutes is the minimum period a terrier shall be in contact with the badger, except when the terrier draws the badger in less time. Each terrier shall be withdrawn as soon as possible after the five minutes have expired. The judges may direct that a terrier be again tried if, in their opinion, the first trial was for any reason an insufficient test.

10. Five minutes are to be allowed a terrier before being disqualified for failing to get in contact.

11. Barking shall be eliminated as much as possible and disqualification will follow barking after contact, provided that no terrier is disqualified for barking when in actual contact.

== See also ==
- Earthdog trial
- Badger-baiting
- Working terrier
- Behaviour and Personality Assessment in Dogs
