= Wheaten =

Wheaten can refer to anything related to wheat, including wheat flour and wheat grain.

- Wheaten bread, a type of Irish soda bread, using whole wheat grains
- Wheaten cornflour, gluten powder sold under this name in Australia, also known as wheat starch
- Soft-Coated Wheaten Terrier, a breed of dog originating in Ireland, named due to its wheat-like colour
