= Irish Kennel Club =

Kennel club in the Republic of Ireland

- Abbreviation: IKC
- Formation: January 20, 1922; 104 years ago
- Type: Kennel club
- Location: Fottrell House, Harold's Cross Bridge, Harold's Cross, Dublin 6W, Ireland
- Region served: Ireland
- Official language: English
- Website: www.ikc.ie

The Irish Kennel Club (IKC) is an organization dedicated to supporting dog breeds and their owners. It maintains a register of purebred dogs in Ireland, issuing pedigree certificates, transfer of ownership certification and export licenses where required. The Irish Kennel Club is a member of the Fédération Cynologique Internationale, and is recognized by the FCI as the authority on the 9 native Irish pedigree dogs.

== History ==
The number of Kerry Blue Terriers increased dramatically in the Dublin area as the breed gained admirers in the early 1920s. On St. Patrick's Day 1921, a conformation dog show was organized which included other breeds, in opposition to The Kennel Club of the UK. The popularity of the show was the catalyst that led to the formation of the Irish Kennel Club. The first meeting was held on January 20, 1922.

Even during The Troubles, Northern Ireland supported Irish Kennel Club shows, and breeders in the North and South freely crossed the border to show their dogs, though travel could often be dangerous. However, Irish Kennel Club awards did not count towards UK titles or qualifications.

During the COVID-19 Pandemic, the number of dogs registered in Ireland increased, but Kennel Club numbers decreased. A spokesman for the DSCPA said that this indicates an increase in puppies coming from poor conditions.

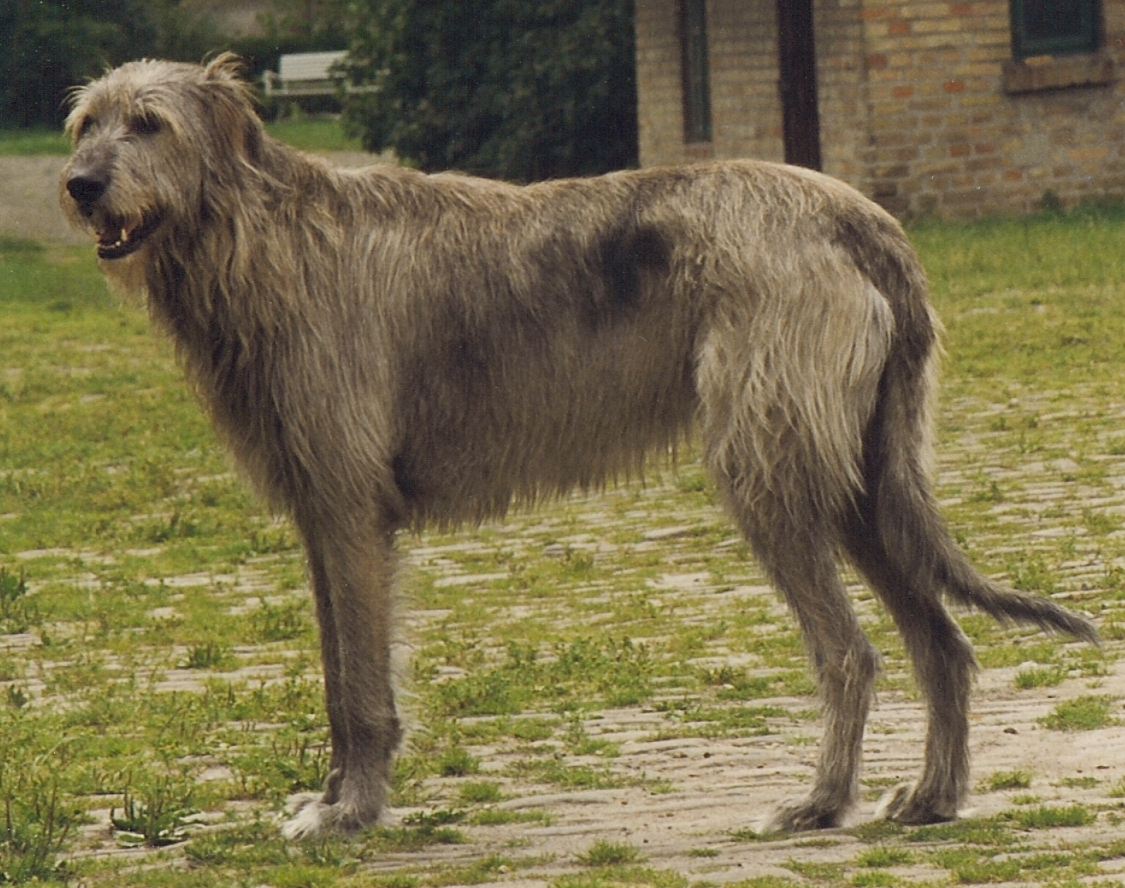
The Irish Wolfhound is one of the pedigree breeds for which the IKC is the authority of.

=== Native Irish pedigree dogs ===
Beginning in 2015, club president Sean Delmar campaigned for the Department of Arts, Heritage, and the Gaeltacht to award heritage status to 9 Irish breeds, as a safeguard against their extinction. These breeds were the Irish Wolfhound, Irish Red Setter, Irish Red and White Setter, Irish Water Spaniel, Kerry Blue Terrier, Irish Terrier, Soft Coated Wheaten Terrier, Glen of Imaal Terrier, and Kerry Beagle. The campaign was ultimately successful, with heritage status for all 9 breeds being achieved in 2019. Delmar's father, Joe, was the founder of Shillelagh Kennels, an early kennel dedicated to Kerry Blue Terriers.

== Affiliation ==
The Irish Kennel Club became a member of the Fédération Cynologique Internationale in 2005. The FCI recognizes the IKC as the authority on the 9 native Irish pedigree dogs, and as the author on the standard for each of those breeds.

== Activities ==
=== Showing ===
The Irish Kennel Club awards certificates, known as Green Stars, to winning dogs at Championship Shows. A champion dog must earn seven Green Stars under seven different judges, and at least one of the Stars must have been earned after the dog is 15 weeks old.

The club is known for its annual Saint Patrick's Day show. Allegedly, its initial popularity stemmed from the fact that, with all pubs closed on the holiday, the show was the only place to find alcohol to drink. This resulted in an annual increase in club membership every March, until the regulations around alcohol were repealed in the 1970s.

=== Other activities ===
The Irish Kennel Club has worked to improve the welfare of racing greyhounds. It has hosted events promoting the adoption of retired racers, and worked with the Irish Greyhound Board to promote such rehomings.

In 2016, new regulations required all dogs in Ireland to be microchipped. The Irish Kennel Club is one of four authorized databases with which a dog can be registered.

== See also ==
- Teastas Mor
- Irish Coursing Club
