= Lancashire Heeler =

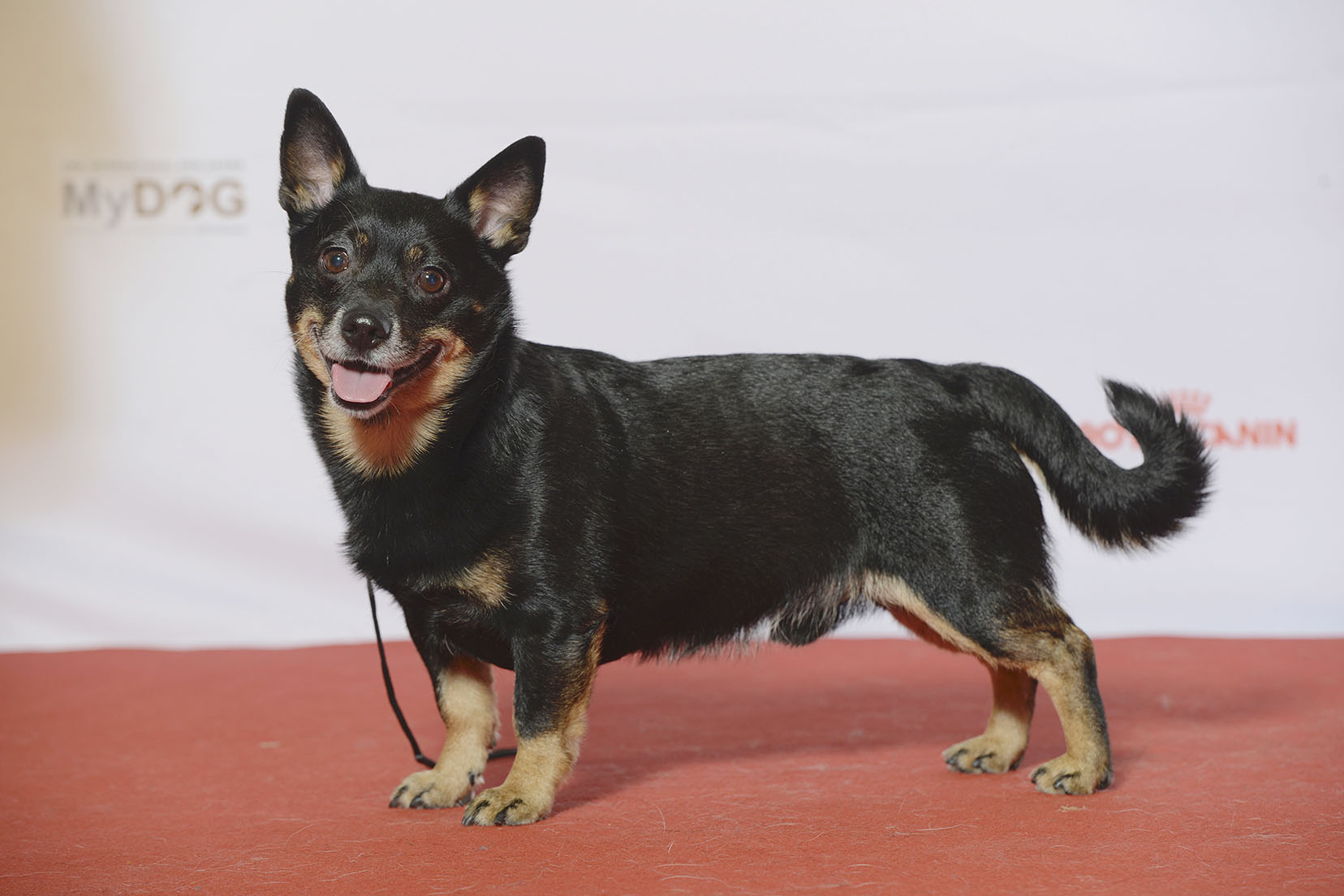
- A Lancashire Heeler at a dog show.
- Other names: Ormskirk Heeler; Ormskirk Terrier
- Origin: England
Kennel club standards
- The Kennel Club: standard
- Fédération Cynologique Internationale: standard

The Lancashire Heeler is a small breed of dog developed for use as a drover and herder of cattle. The Lancashire Heeler is listed by the Kennel Club (UK) as an endangered breed. The breed was recognized by the American Kennel Club in 2024.

== Description ==
The dog's coat is harsh and smooth with an undercoat which keeps the dog dry in all weathers. It may have a slight mane around the neck in winter. The dog is usually black and tan, but liver and tan is also recognised by the Kennel Club. They are slightly longer than height at withers, usually measures between 10–12 inches (25–30 cm) at the shoulder and weighs 13–18 pounds (5.9–8.2 kg).

In terms of personality, the breed standard used by the American Kennel Club describes them as "courageous, happy," and "affectionate to owner". When happy, Lancashire Heelers may part their lips to mimic a human smile.

== Health ==
A 2024 UK study found a life expectancy of 15.4 years —the highest in the study— for the breed compared to an average of 12.7 for purebreeds and 12 for crossbreeds.

The three most common serious conditions that can affect Heelers are Collie eye anomaly, primary lens luxation and persistent pupillary membranes. As well as these eye conditions, dogs of this breed may suffer from Patella luxation. The Lancashire Heeler is one of the more commonly affected breeds for primary lens luxation which is caused by an autosomal recessive mutation of the ADAMTS17 gene.

== History ==
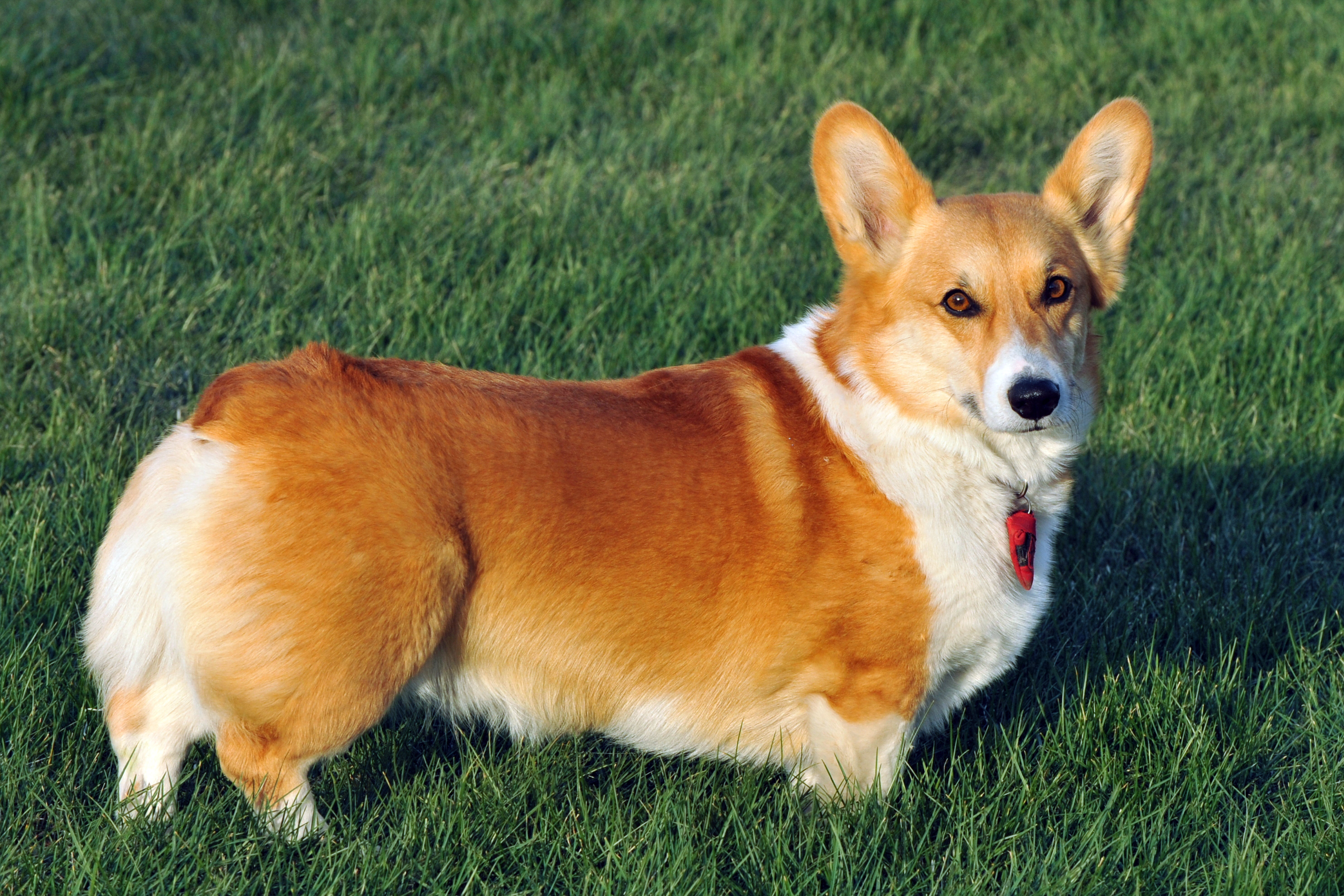
The Welsh Corgi is thought to be one of the parent breeds of the Lancashire Heeler.

It is generally accepted that the Lancashire Heeler is descended from the Welsh Corgi and the Manchester Terrier in England. The breed has been known in its home county for over one hundred and fifty years as a general-purpose farm dog, capable of both ratting and herding cattle.

Gwen Mackintosh began to breed Heelers in the early 1960s. Together with other enthusiasts, she established the Lancashire Heeler Club in 1978, with the club setting a breed standard and register. Recognition by The Kennel Club followed in 1981. Mackintosh would continue to serve as the club's president until her death in 1992.

The breed was recognised as a vulnerable native breed by The Kennel Club in 2006, meaning that annual registration figures are 300 or fewer for the breed. In 2006, 173 Heelers were registered in the UK; by 2007, this number had further decreased to 146. In 2016, the FCI added the breed to the list of provisionally accepted breeds. The Lancashire Heeler was recognized by the American Kennel Club in 2024, and made its first appearance at the AKC's National Dog Show that year.
