= Notre Dame Leprechaun =

Mascot of the Notre Dame Fighting Irish

The Leprechaun
- Team: Fighting Irish
- University: University of Notre Dame
- Conference: ACC (primary); Big Ten (men's ice hockey); Independent (football)
- Description: Irish leprechaun with his fists up
- Origin of name: Irish heritage
- First seen: 1960
- Website: Official website

The Notre Dame Leprechaun is the mascot of the University of Notre Dame (Notre Dame) Fighting Irish athletics department. He appears at athletic events, most notably at football games. He was designed by sports artist Theodore W. Drake in 1964 for US$50.

The Leprechaun was featured in the cover of TIME magazine in November 1964.

== Irish tradition ==
The Fighting Irish logo features a side view of The Leprechaun with his fists up, ready to battle anyone that comes his way. The live version is a student, chosen annually at tryouts, dressed in a cutaway green suit and Irish country hat. The Leprechaun brandishes a shillelagh and aggressively leads cheers and interacts with the crowd, supposedly bringing magical powers and good luck to the Notre Dame team.

The Leprechaun was not always the official mascot of Notre Dame. For years, the team was represented by a series of Irish Terrier dogs. The first, named Brick Top Shuan-Rhu, was donated by Charles Otis of Cleveland and presented to football head coach Knute Rockne the weekend of the Notre Dame-Pennsylvania game November 8, 1930. A number of terriers later took the role of the school mascot, which usually took the name Clashmore Mike. The Clashmore Mike mascot last made an appearance on the cover of the 1963 Notre Dame Football Dope Book with coach Hugh Devore and captain Bob Lehmann. In 1960, the Irish cheerleaders added the leprechaun to their cheering lineup. Terry Crawford, dressed in green, would walk back and forth in front of the cheerleading group with the Irish terrier, Mike.

The Leprechaun was named the official mascot in 1965, when the Leprechaun was registered as an official university mark. However, earlier, in 1961, John Brandt from Elyria, Ohio became the first man to don the uniform and appear with Clashmore Mike at a home game against Oklahoma. Brandt served as the Leprechaun until 1963.

== Campus figure ==
The Leprechaun can be seen around campus on football game weekends as they act as the MC of Friday night pep rallies and makes several appearances at tailgates before games. During games, they lead the traditional cheers of the student section, who are named "The Leprechaun Legion."

Along with the cheerleaders, The Leprechaun also travels with the team as the Fighting Irish travel across the nation. They engage in several community service initiatives and makes public appearances.

== Tryouts ==
Tryouts to become The Leprechaun take place over a monthlong process each spring. Prospect leprechauns are presented with several mental and physical challenges until the field is narrowed down to under ten finalists. During the final round of tryouts, each contestant must lead a 5-minute mock pep rally, answer questions during an interview with a local media personality, respond to a game situation, answer Notre Dame trivia, dance Notre Dame's version of the Irish Jig, and complete 50 pushups. A panel of judges then interviews each candidate in private before making the final decision.

Despite popular belief, there are no strict requirements for becoming the leprechaun. Notre Dame students of any height are eligible to try out regardless of their ability to grow a beard. The overall "look" of candidates does weigh into the decision, however, and more often than not a young man with a chinstrap beard will be chosen.

Lynette Wukie became the first female to portray the Leprechaun mascot at the University of Notre Dame in 2019, serving until 2021. Later, Kylee Kazenski became the first woman to perform the role specifically at a Notre Dame football game, doing so in 2023.
