= Theodore W. Drake =

American cartoonist

Theodore W. Drake (September 2, 1907 – May 25, 2000) was an American cartoonist, graphic artist, and sports artist known for creating the college-sports mascot the Notre Dame Leprechaun and possibly the NBA Chicago Bulls logo.

Drake is probably best remembered for the creation of the Notre Dame Leprechaun, for which he was paid $50. The Leprechaun was first used on the 1964 football pocket schedule and later on the football program covers, and featured on the cover of Time magazine in November 1964. Ted Drake has been credited by The New York Times and the Chicago Tribune as the creator of the Chicago Bulls logo, but commercial designer Dean Wessel has also been credited as the author of the Bulls logo. In the early 1950s, Drake was the main graphic artist for the Kukla, Fran and Ollie television puppet show, creating its opening titles along with album covers, newsletters, advertisements, and even Christmas cards.

== Sources ==
- The Spindrift Cartoons: 1943 edited by Matthew H. Gore (Ellendale: Tennessee, 2008).
