= Dandie Dinmont Terrier =

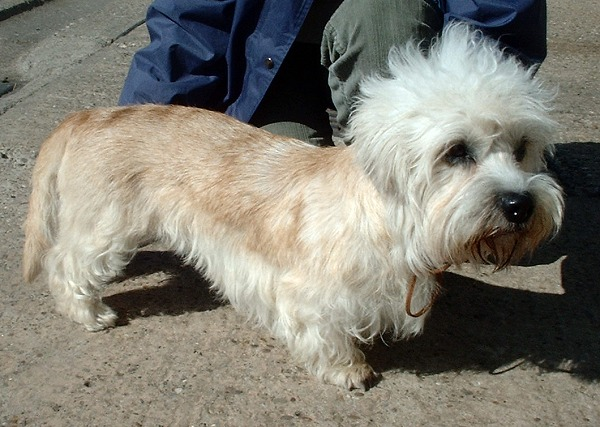
- The mustard colour of the Dandie can be any shade including and between reddish brown and fawn.
- Common nicknames: Dandie; Hindlee Terrier
- Origin: Scotland
Traits
- Height: 8–11 inches (20–28 cm)
- Weight: 18–24 pounds (8.2–10.9 kg)
- Coat: Rough coated
- Colour: Pepper or mustard
Kennel club standards
- The Kennel Club: standard
- Fédération Cynologique Internationale: standard

A Dandie Dinmont Terrier is a small Scottish dog breed in the terrier family. The breed has a very long body, short legs, and a distinctive topknot of hair on the head. They are friendly but tough, and are suitable for interaction with older children. There are breed-specific health concerns: they can be affected by spinal problems due to their elongated body, and the breed is affected by canine cancer at a higher than average rate.

The breed is named after a fictional character in Sir Walter Scott's novel, Guy Mannering. This character, Dandie Dinmont, is thought to be partly based on James Davidson, who is credited as the originator of the modern breed. Davidson's dogs descended from earlier terrier-owning families, including the Allans of Holystone, Northumberland.

There are three breed clubs in the UK supporting the breed, although it is registered as a Vulnerable Native Breed by the Kennel Club due to its low number of puppy registrations per year.

== History ==
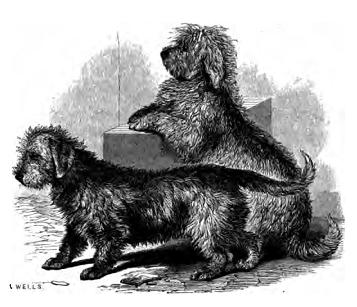
A drawing of two Dandie Dinmont Terriers from 1859

The breed originates from the dogs being used in the Anglo-Scottish border country. During the 1600s, they were used for hunting badgers and otters. Whilst their ultimate origin remains unknown, dogs owned by the Allans of Holystone, Northumberland in the early 1700s are thought to have been involved in their early origins.

These dogs may have been a type of Border Terrier, although other theories exist including the idea that they are a cross between Scottish Terriers and Skye Terriers. The head of this family was Willie "Piper" Allan, who was born in nearby Bellingham. He kept dogs for the hunting of otters. Lord Ravensworth once hired Allan to remove the otters from the pond in Eslington Park. Lord Ravensworth attempted to purchase one of Allan's dogs after he successfully removed the otters, which Allan refused.

Allan died on 18 February 1779, and his dogs passed into the care of his son James. James's son eventually inherited the dogs and sold a dog named Old Pepper to Mr Francis Sommer who came from Town Yetholm on the Scottish side of the border. Old Pepper was descended from one of Willie Allan's dogs who had worked Lord Ravensworth's manor.

The breed remained relatively unknown outside of the Borders until 1815 when Sir Walter Scott's novel Guy Mannering was published. Scott spent time in the area whilst the Sheriff of Selkirk learned of the prowess of these types of specialist terriers for working both fox and otter. When he wrote Guy Mannering, he included a character by the name of Dandie Dinmont who owned a number of terriers named Pepper and Mustard after the colours of their coats. The Dinmont character was partly based on the real life farmer and terrier owner, James Davidson, who too used the generic terms of Pepper and Mustard for his dogs depending on their coats. Davidson's dogs came from a variety of sources including the dogs of the Allan, Anderson and Faas families. Davidson documented his breeding, and he has been accepted as the originator of the modern breed.

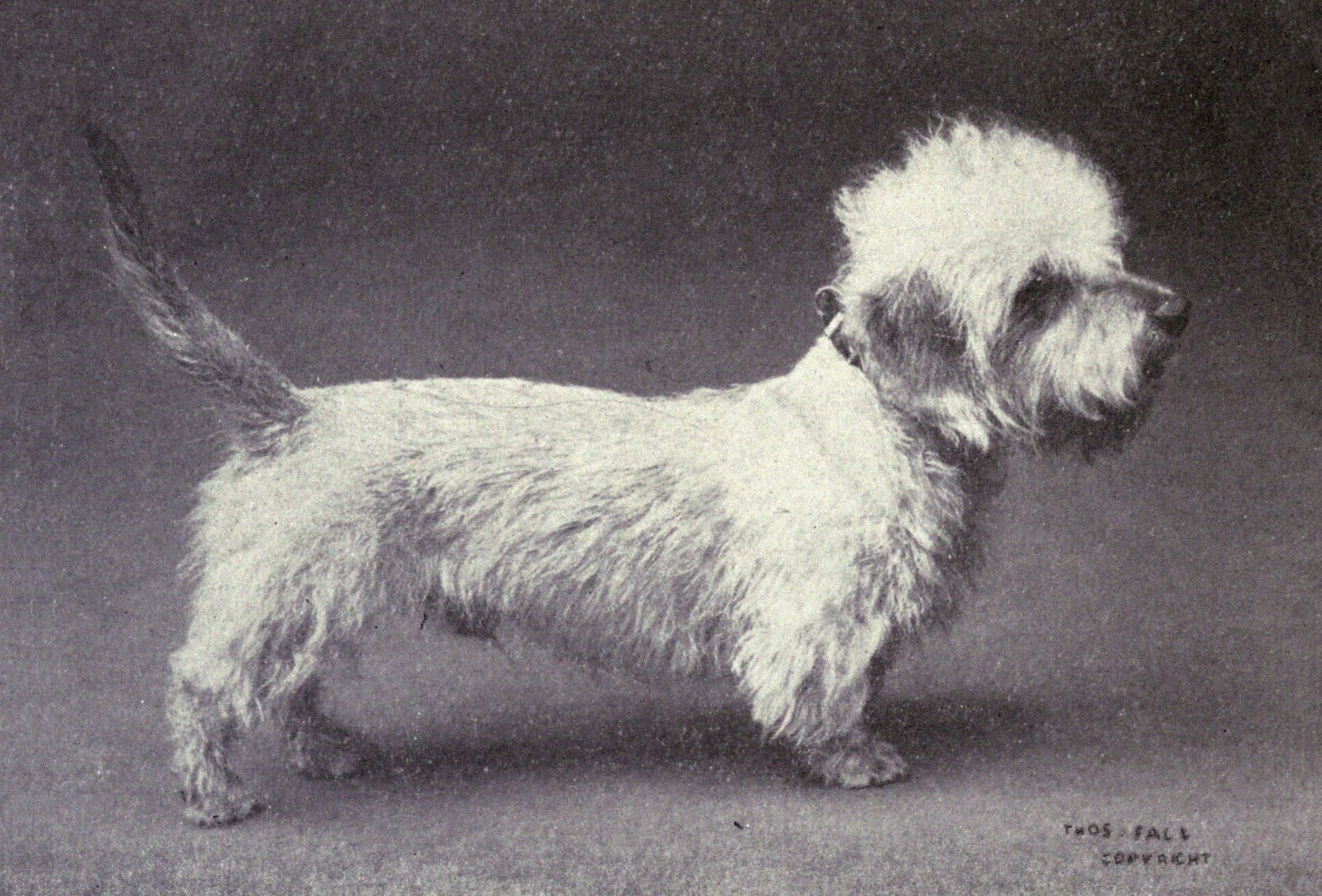
Dandie Dinmont Terrier circa 1915

Some interbreeding with other breeds took place in the mid-1800s, which may have introduced Dachshund blood into the breed, although certain breeders maintained pure-bred lines. The Dachshund theory was first introduced by John Henry Walsh under the pseudonym of "Stonehenge" in the 1880s, and was denied by many breeders of that era. By the mid-1800s, the breed was known as the Dandie Dinmont Terrier, and became sought after for hunting after Scott's writings were published. They remain the only dog breed to have been named after a fictional character. Around this time the breed had some involvement in the development of the Bedlington Terrier.

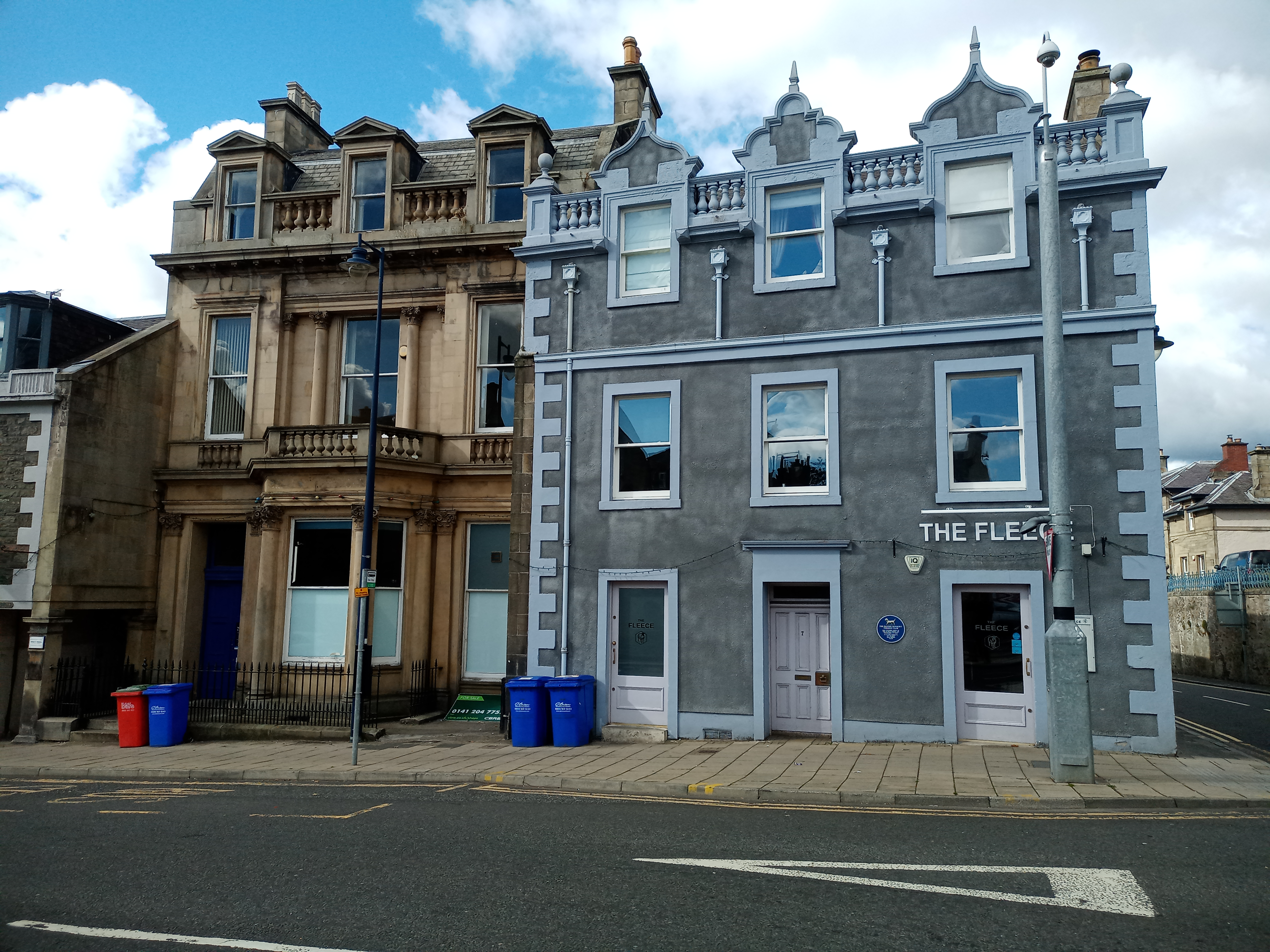
The Fleece Hotel in Selkirk with plaque noting the club's formation there

The Kennel Club formed in 1873 and, at the Fleece Hotel at Selkirk, Scottish Borders on 17 November 1875, the Dandie Dinmont Terrier Club (DDTC) was formed, becoming the third oldest breed club for dogs in the world. Lord Melgund was the society's first president, while E Bradshaw Smith was the first vice president. Breeders Hugh Dalziel and William Stachen were also involved in the formation of the club. The breed standard was created by William Wardlaw Reid, another founding member of the club, with it was agreed to a year later at another meeting of the club. A club show was held for the first time in Carlisle in 1877. Shows after this were held in conjunction with other clubs on a yearly basis until 1928 when it moved to the Market Hall in Carlisle, where with the exception of during the Second World War, the shows continued to be held until 1982. Shows continued to be held in the general area until 2001 when they moved south to Cheshire and Lancashire.

The DDTC is not the only breed club in the UK. For a while several breed clubs were created in Scotland, but none lasted particularly long except for the Scottish Dandie Dinmont Terrier Society which merged into the DDTC in 1929. Today, in addition to the DDTC, there are also the Southern Dandie Dinmont Terrier Society, and for Scotland, the Caledonian Dandie Dinmont Club.

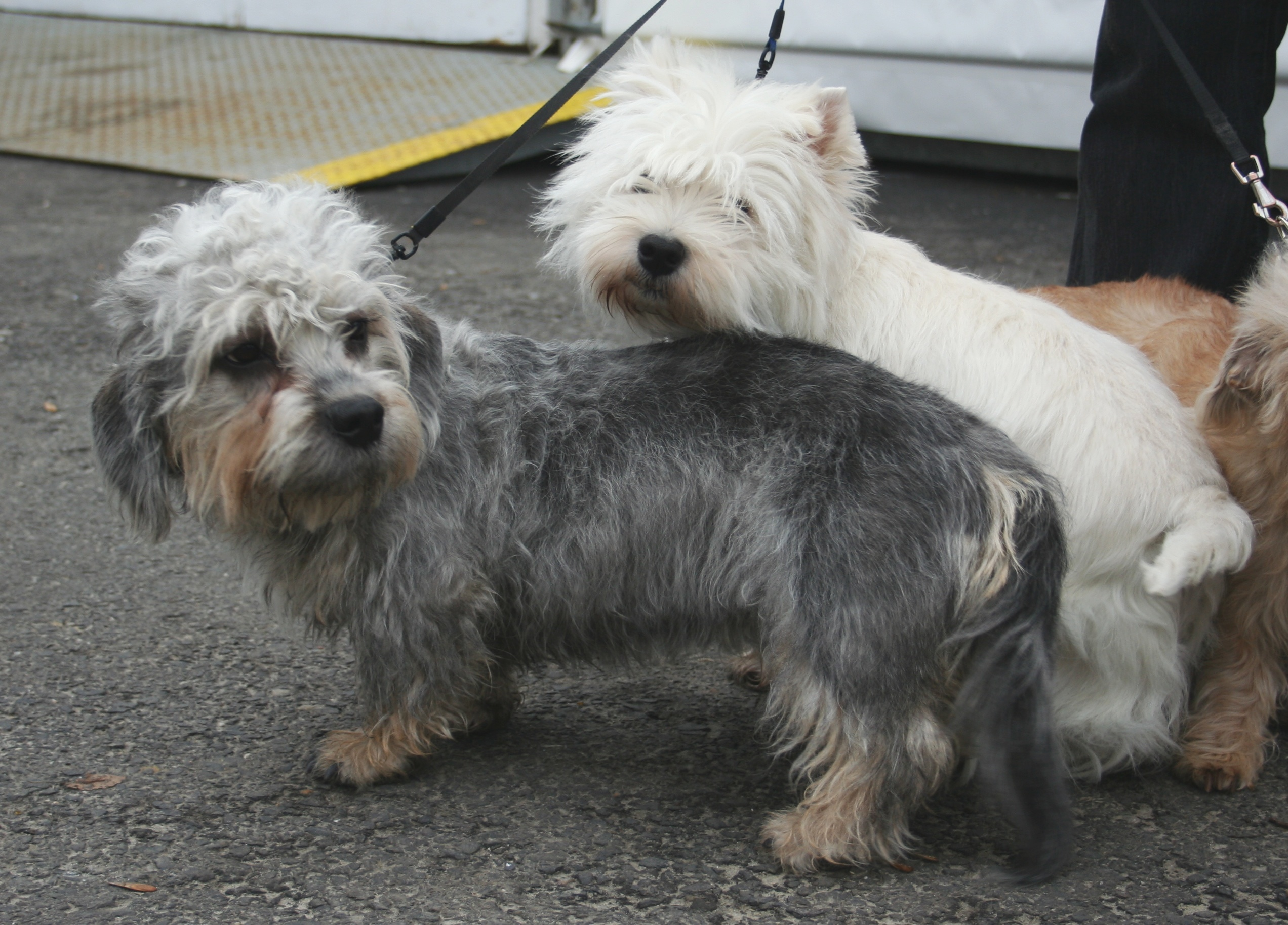
A Dandie Dinmont Terrier and the more numerous West Highland White Terrier

The breed was first registered with the American Kennel Club (AKC) in 1888. The Dandie Dinmont Terrier was recognized by the United Kennel Club (UKC) in 1918. During the Second World War many kennels were dispersed and the dogs destroyed, due to both the lack of food caused by rationing and that of manpower. Following the war several kennels led the way to re–establishing the breed including the Bellmead Kennels, located first in Surrey before later moving to Old Windsor. Dandies continued to be bred up at Bellmead up until the early 1990s, when it passed into the hands of Battersea Dogs and Cats Home.

In 2006, the Kennel Club recognised the Dandie Dinmont Terrier as one of the rarest dog breeds native to the British Isles, putting it on a new list of Vulnerable Native Breeds. The breeds chosen for this list were those who originated in the UK and Ireland, but had less than 300 puppy registrations per year. One particularly low period was between July and September 2003, when only 21 puppies were registered, of which 18 were male. Overall that year, only 90 puppies were registered in the UK, compared to 9,823 for the West Highland White Terrier. Additionally numbers had dropped to low levels in America as well, with the AKC registering only 75 puppies in the same time period. Following work after 2006, the Dandie Dinmont registration numbers improved slightly, with 151 puppies registered with the Kennel Club in 2010, the highest number for any year in the previous ten years. Of other breeds of native terrier, only the Skye, Sealyham, Manchester and Glen of Imaal Terriers have lower registration figures.

== Description ==
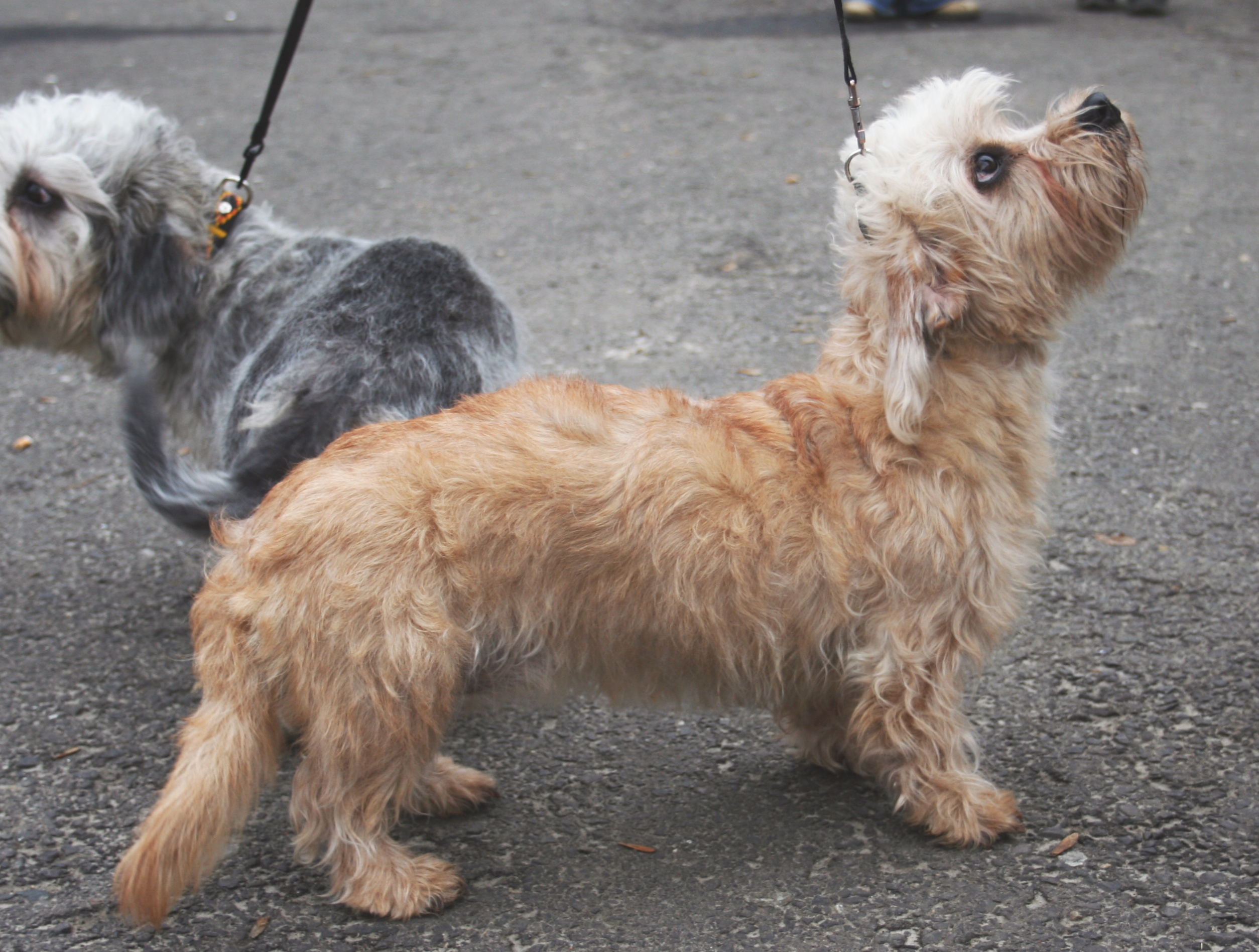
A pepper coloured Dandie (left), and a Mustard Dandie (right)

The breed has short legs, with an elongated body. Unusually among Scottish terrier breeds, it has pendulous ears. The neck is muscular, having developed from the breed's use against larger game. The typical height at the withers is 8–11 inches (20–28 cm), and they can weigh anywhere between 18–24 pounds (8.2–10.9 kg).

While the Dandie generally is a hardy breed, it may have issue climbing stairs. They have a silky coat which forms a topknot on top of the dog's head. The Dandie Dinmont Terrier has a similar body shape to the Skye Terrier, but the Skye's coat is thicker and longer.

The coat comes in two colour ranges, pepper and mustard. Pepper ranges from dark blueish black to very light silvery gray; mustard can vary from reddish brown to fawn, with the head appearing to be almost white. Typically, the legs and feet are of a darker colour with the lighter colour on the body slowly blending into that on the legs. The depth of the coat can reach up to 2 inches (5.1 cm). The colour of the coat is usually set by the time the dog reaches eight months of age, but the Dandie Dinmont Terrier will continue to mature physically until around two years old.

== Temperament ==
The breed is tough but usually friendly and is suitable for older children. It makes both a good companion and a guard dog but is among the most docile of the terrier breeds; they are usually quite undemanding of their owners. However they are known for their ability to dig large holes in a short space of time. They can be trained to be good with cats but should not be trusted around smaller animals such as hamsters or rats. They are described as being "very game", in that they are prone to challenging other animals, including foxes, and in some cases other dogs.

== Health ==
A 2024 UK study found a life expectancy of 12.8 years for the breed compared to an average of 12.7 for purebreeds and 12 for crossbreeds.

Due to the breed's elongated body, there can be back problems within the breed, specifically with intervertebral discs in the dog's back. These discs can sometimes slip out of place, resulting in spinal disc herniation. Symptoms depend on what part of the dog's back is affected; they can include weakness, paralysis, and/or loss of bladder control.

An American study found a higher risk for extra-hepatic congenital portosystemic shunts, with 1.6% of Dandie Dinmont Terriers having the condition compared to 0.18% overall and 0.05% for mixed-breed dogs.

The Dandie Dinmont Terrier is also at a slightly higher risk of cancer than average.
