= Irish Terrier =

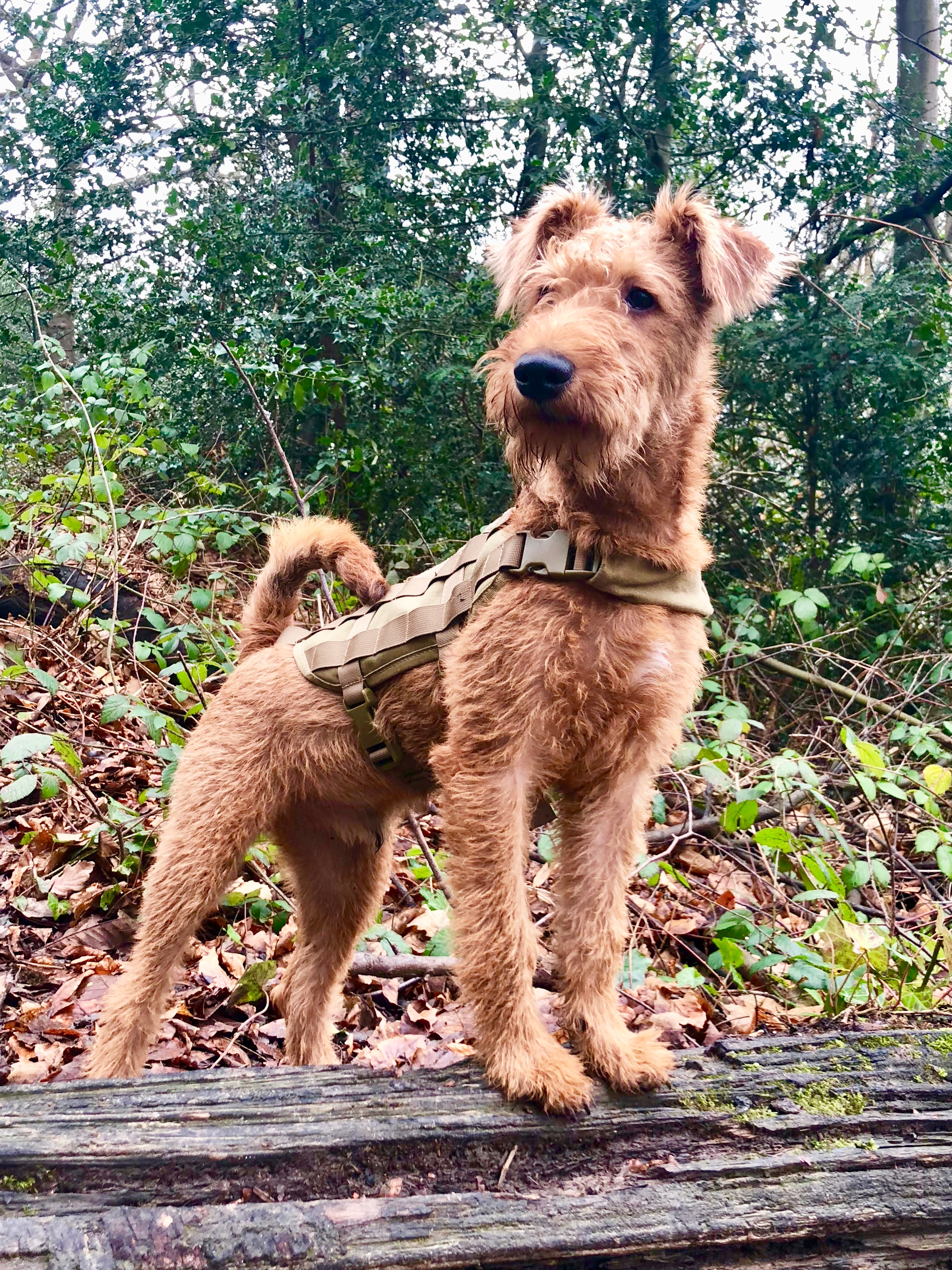
- Irish Terrier in Sydenham Hill Woods, London
- Other names: Irish Red Terrier
- Origin: Ireland
Traits
Height	Males	17–18 inches (43–46 cm)
	Females	16–18 inches (41–46 cm)
- Weight: 24 to 27 lb
	Males	25–27 pounds (11–12 kg)
	Females	24–26 pounds (11–12 kg)
- Coat: Dense, wiry
- Color: bright red, golden red, red
Kennel club standards
- Irish Kennel Club: standard
- Fédération Cynologique Internationale: standard

The Irish Terrier (Irish: Brocaire Rua) is a dog breed from Ireland, one of many breeds of terrier. The Irish Terrier is considered one of the oldest terrier breeds. The Dublin dog show in 1873 was the first to provide a separate class for Irish Terriers. By the 1880s, Irish Terriers were the fourth most popular breed in Great Britain and Ireland.

The Irish Terrier is an active and compactly sized dog that is suited for life in both rural and city environments. Its harsh red coat protects it from all kinds of weather.

== Description ==
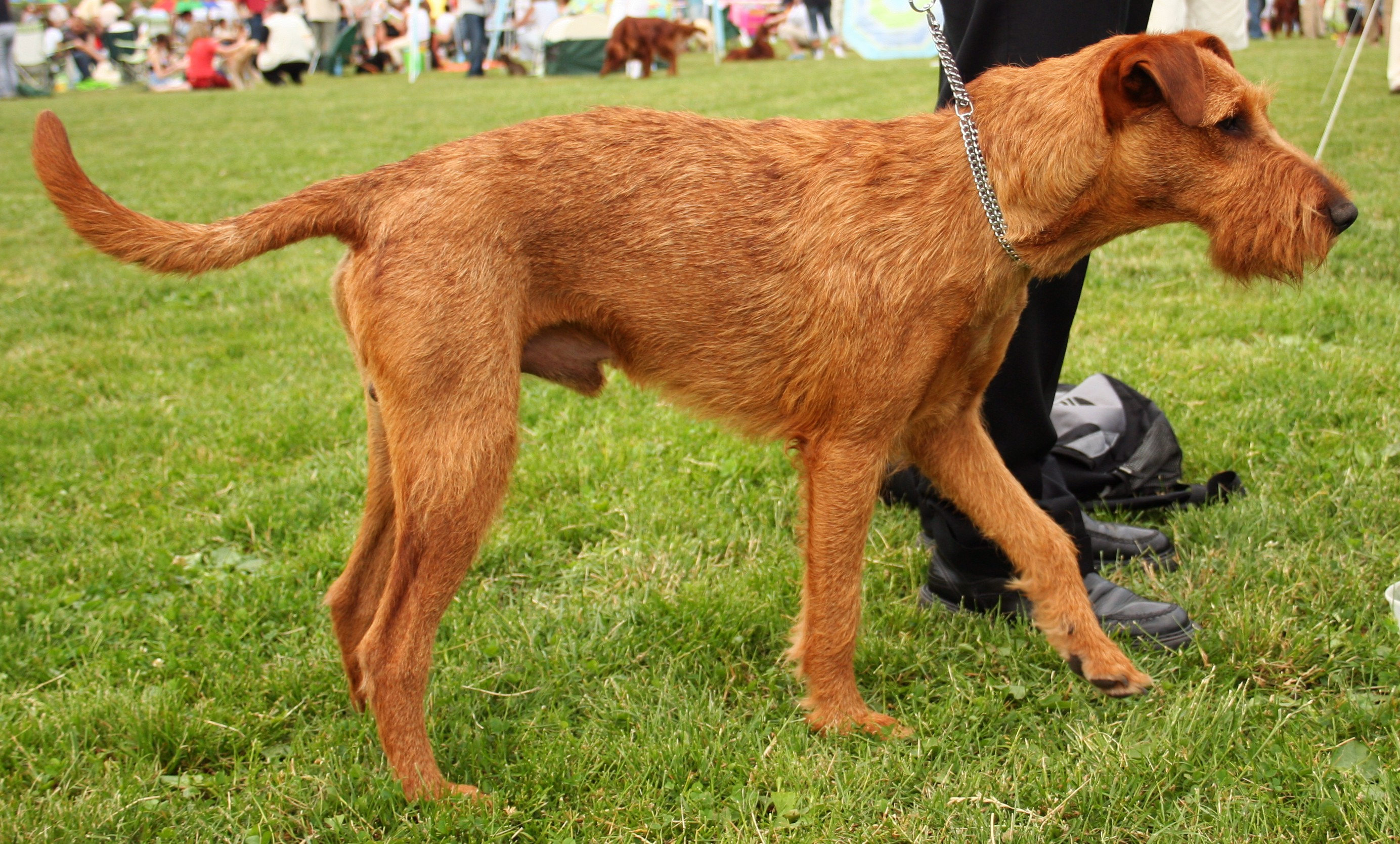
An Irish Terrier with an un-docked tail

=== Appearance ===
Breed standards describe the ideal Irish Terrier as being racy, red and rectangular. Racy: an Irish Terrier should appear powerful without being sturdy or heavy. Rectangular: the outline of the Irish Terrier differs markedly from those of other terriers. The Irish Terrier's body is proportionately longer than that of the Fox Terrier, with a tendency toward racy lines but with no lack of substance. The deep chest is distinctive.

Formerly, the tail was customarily docked soon after birth to approximately two-thirds of the original length. In countries where docking is prohibited, the conformation judges emphasise tail carriage. The tail should start up quite high, but it should not stick straight up or curl over the back or either side of its body. The ears are small and folded forward just above skull level. They are preferably slightly darker than the rest of the coat.

==== Coat and colour ====
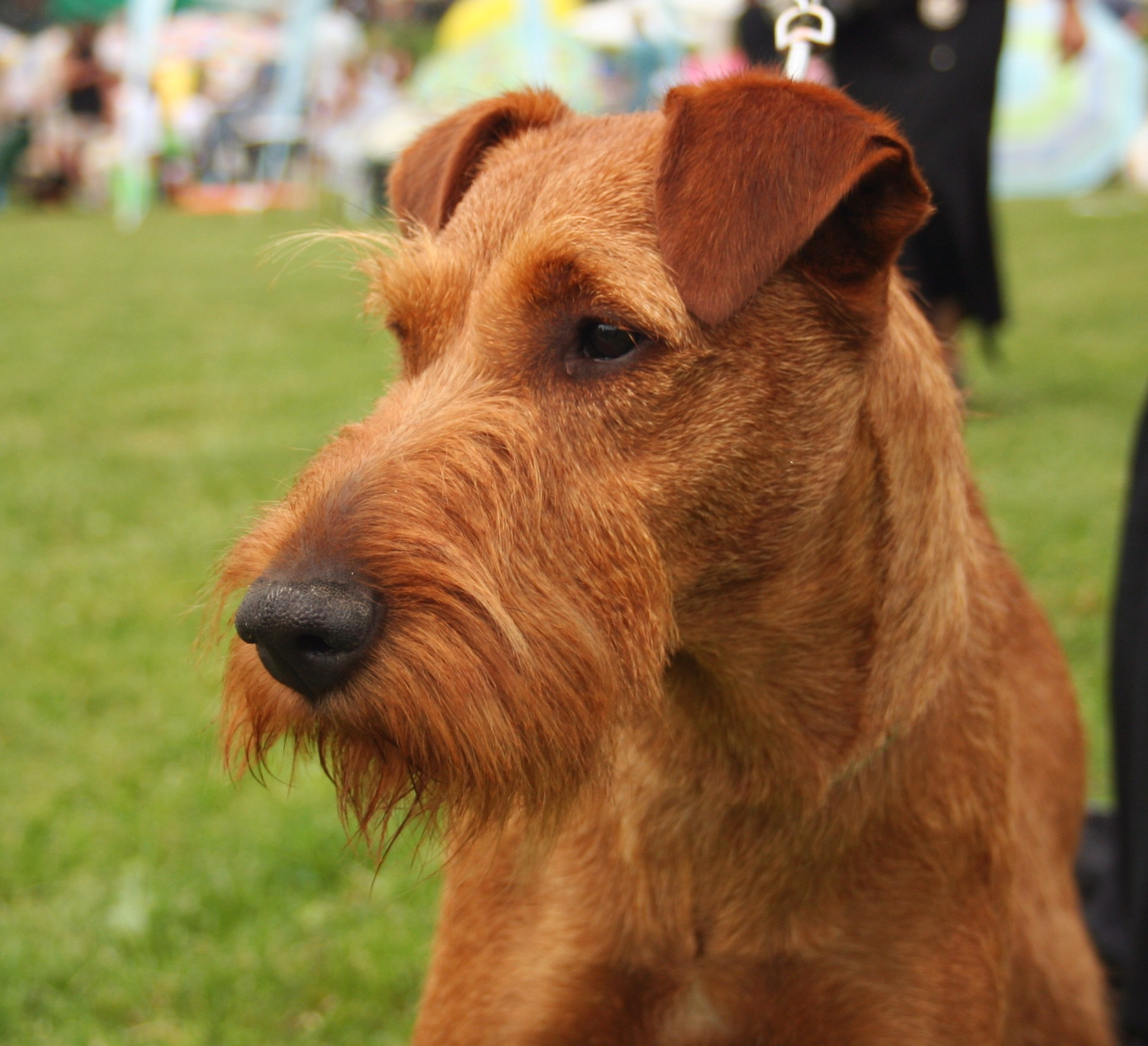
An Irish Terrier with good ear carriage

The Irish Terrier is coloured golden red, red wheaten, or wheaten. Dark red is often mistaken as the only correct colour, possibly because wheaten coats are often of worse quality. As with many other solid-coloured breeds, a small patch of white is allowed on the chest. No white should appear elsewhere. As an Irish Terrier grows older, grey hair may appear here and there.

The outer part of the double coat should be straight and wiry in texture, never soft, silky, curly, wavy, or woolly as might be expected in the Kerry Blue Terrier. The coat should lie flat against the skin, and, though having some length, should never be so long as to hide the true shape of the dog. There are longer hairs on the legs, but never so much as a Wire Fox Terrier or Schnauzer. That means you have to have the coat trimmed often which can be expensive.

The inner part of the coat, called the under-wool or undercoat, should also be red. The under-wool may be hard for the inexperienced eye to see. Coat should be quite dense and so that "when parted with the fingers the skin is hardly visible".

A properly trimmed Irish Terrier should have some "furnishings" on legs and head. The slightly longer hair on the front legs should form even pillars, while the rear legs should only have some longer hair and not be trimmed too close to the skin. The chin is accentuated with a small beard. The beard should not be as profuse as that of a Schnauzer.

The eyes should be dark brown and quite small with a "fiery" expression. The eyes are topped with well-groomed eyebrows. The whole head should have good pigmentation.

==== Size ====
Most countries have breed descriptions that say that the Irish Terrier should not be more than 48 cm measured at the withers. However, it is not unusual to see females that are 50 cm tall or dogs that are even 53 cm (20 in). Younger generations are closer to the ideal, but there is a downside to this: when an Irish Terrier is very small and light-boned, it loses the correct racy type.

Very seldom does one see Irish Terriers that weigh only 11 to 12 kg (25–27 lb), as the original Kennel Club breed description states. 13 kg for a female dog and 15 for a male dog are acceptable.

=== Temperament ===
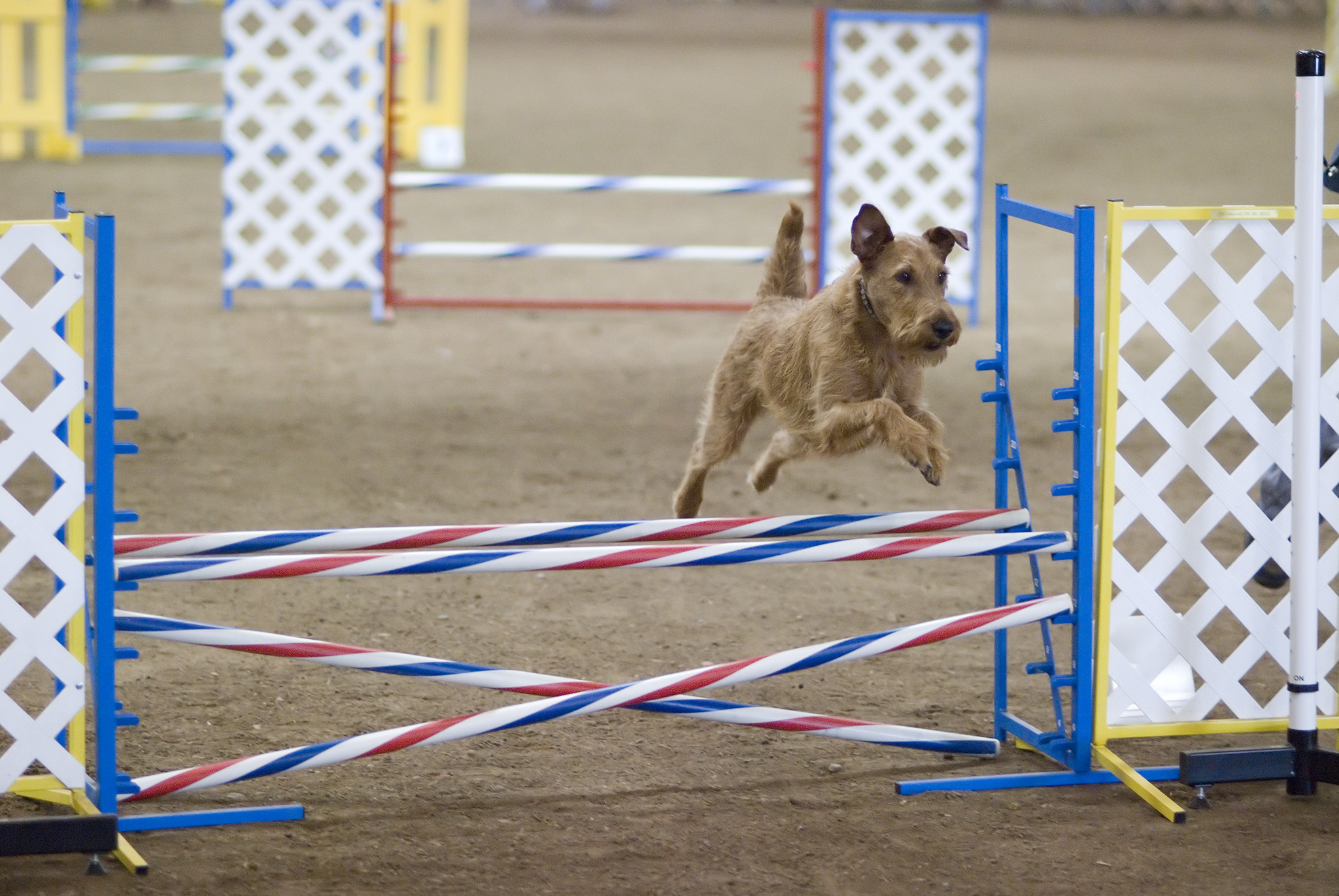
Agility jump

Irish Terriers are active dogs and need and enjoy consistent mental and physical challenges; well-trained Irish Terriers may do well at a variety of dog sports, such as dog agility. The Irish Terrier is full of life, but not hyperactive; it should be able to relax inside the house and roused to full activity level quickly.

Irish Terriers are good with people. They have a highly developed sense of loyalty and it is important that they have a strong responsible leader which they respect. Most Irish Terriers love children and tolerate rough-housing to a certain extent. Irish terriers need exercise and require large amounts of walking. They enjoy training and learn fast, with food and toys working equally well as motivation. Irish terriers have less of an eagerness to please people than some other breeds but have mental ability and enjoy puzzle solving. They respond best to consistent, reward based training from a relaxed, authoritative person. As with all dog breeds, violence should never be used, preferring distraction and rewarding the desired behaviour. It is always best to outwit and lure. When seeking a trainer, one should look for a person who has experience with terriers.

Irish Terriers are often dominant with other dogs. As with any dog, poorly socialised individuals can start fights and early socialisation is a necessity. Most have strong guarding instincts which, when controlled, make them excellent alarming watchdogs.

Terriers are increasingly popular in organised dog sports. The obedience training required at most levels in most dog sports is fairly easy to achieve, although the precision and long-lasting drive needed in the higher levels may be less so. Many Irish Terriers excel at dog agility, even though it may be hard to balance the speed, independence and precision needed in the higher levels.

Irish Terriers have a good nose and can learn to track either animal or human scent. Many Irish Terriers enjoy lure coursing, although they are not eligible for competition. In Finland one Irish Terrier is a qualified Rescue Dog specialising at Sea Rescue.

== History ==
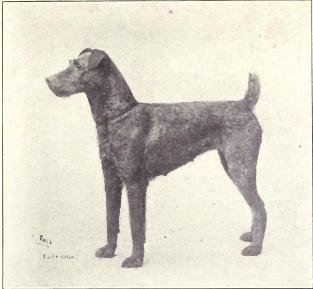
Irish Terrier circa 1915

The breed's origin is not known. It is believed to have descended from the black and tan terrier-type dogs of Britain and Ireland, just like the Kerry Blue and Soft-coated Wheaten Terriers in Ireland or the Welsh, Lakeland and Scottish Terriers in Great Britain. There is also conjecture that the breed may share bloodlines with the Irish Wolfhound.

F. M. Jowett writes in The Irish Terrier, 'Our Dogs' Publishing Co. Ltd., Manchester, England 1947 – 7th Edition: They are described by an old Irish writer as being the poor man's sentinel, the farmer's friend, and the gentleman's favourite...These dogs were originally bred not so much for their looks as for their working qualities and gameness, the Irish Terrier being by instinct a thorough vermin killer. They were formerly of all types and of all colours – black-and-tan, grey-and-brindle, wheaten of all shades, and red being the predominant colours. Colour or size evidently did not matter if they were hardy and game."

The proper selection process of the breed began only in the latter 19th century. They were shown now and then, sometimes in one class, sometimes in separate classes for dogs under and over 9 pounds.

The first breed club was set up in Dublin in 1879. Irish Terriers were the first members of the terrier group to be recognised by the English Kennel Club as a native Irish Breed – this happened just before the end of the 19th century. The first Irish Terriers were taken to the US in the late nineteenth century and quickly became somewhat popular.

== Care ==
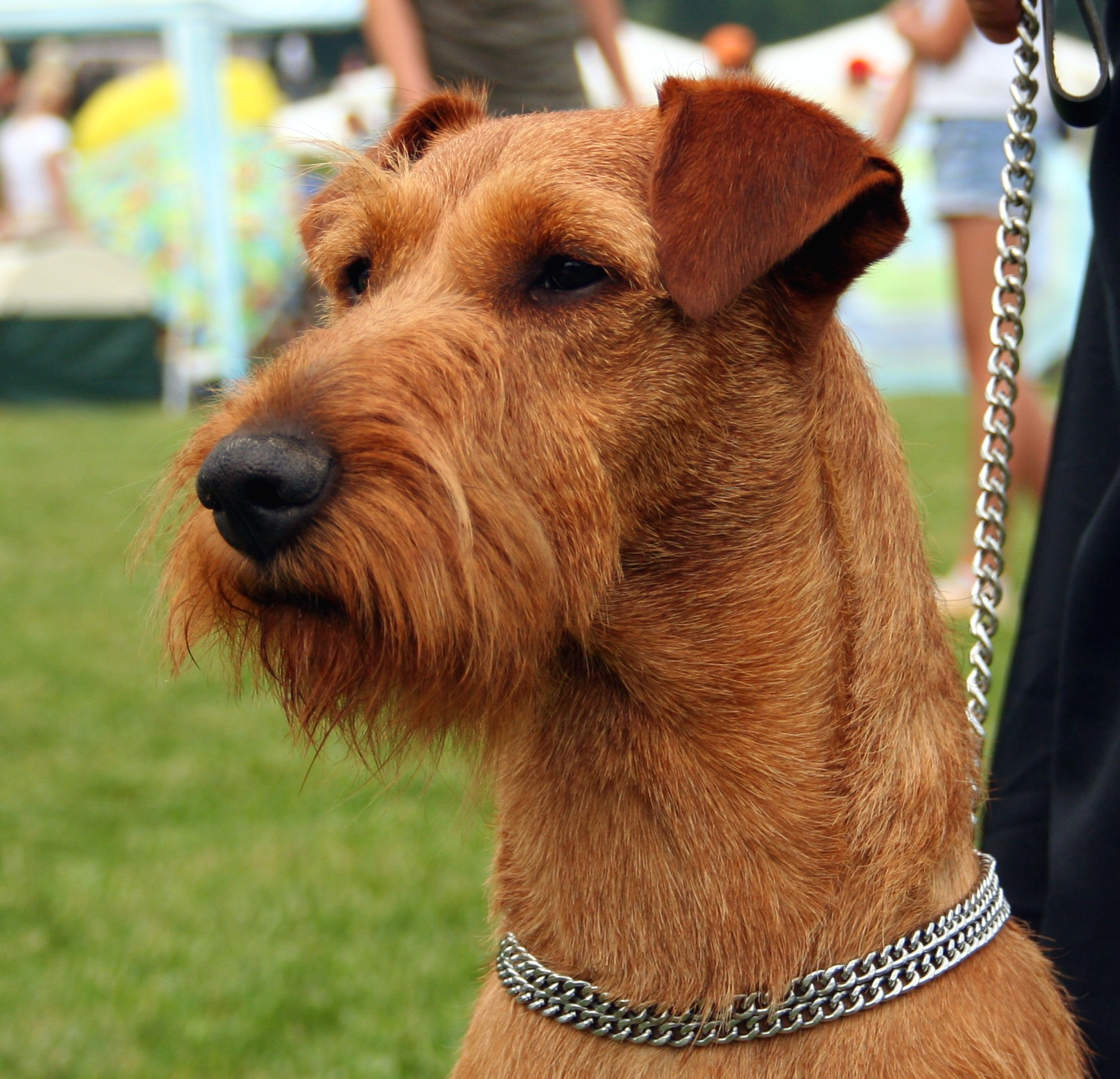
Irish Terrier

When groomed properly, the Irish Terrier coat will protect the dog from rain and cold. A properly cared-for Irish Terrier does not shed either. The wiry coat is fairly easy to groom, pet dogs (rather than show dogs) needing stripping only once or twice a year.

The coat must be stripped by hand or a non-cutting knife to retain its weather-resistant qualities. This does not hurt the dog when done properly. Keeping the skin above the stripped section taut with the other hand helps especially where the skin is looser, i.e. belly and chest. Never cut the coat – use your fingers or a non-cutting knife. If the coat is clipped, it loses colour and becomes softer, thus losing its weather-resistant characteristics. For the same reason the coat should not be washed too often, as detergents take away the natural skin oils. Most Irish terriers only need washing when dirty.

When stripping, the coat may be "taken down" entirely to leave the dog in the undercoat until a new coat grows in. For a pet, this should be done at least twice a year. When a show-quality coat is required, it can be achieved in many ways. One is by "rolling the coat", i.e. stripping the dog every X weeks to remove any dead hair. Before a show an expert trimmer is needed to mould especially the head and legs.

Some Irish Terriers need to have their ears trained when young.

== Health ==
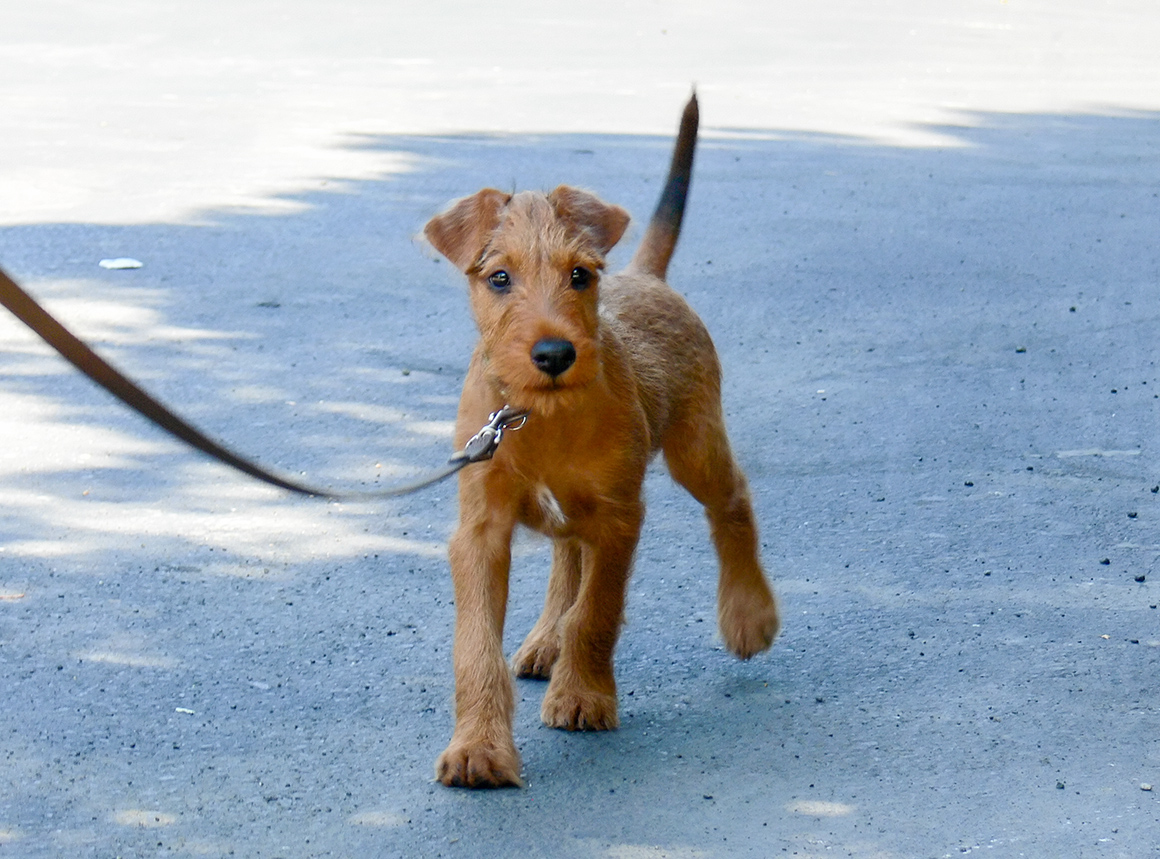
Irish Terrier puppy

A 2024 UK study found a life expectancy of 13.5 years for the breed compared to an average of 12.7 for purebreeds and 12 for crossbreeds.

== Appearances in arts and culture ==
- The 2021 movie, Finch, starring Tom Hanks includes an Irish Terrier-cross called Goodyear.
- Jack London's books Jerry of the Islands and Michael, Brother of Jerry were about Irish Terriers that, according to the bloodlines recorded in the beginning of the book, may actually have lived.
- The 2007 film Firehouse Dog features an Irish Terrier as the title character, portrayed by four different Irish Terriers.
- Former Canadian Prime Minister William Lyon Mackenzie King owned several Irish Terriers (all named Pat), and had séances to "communicate" with the first Pat after the dog's death.
- William Wordsworth's poem "Fidelity" was written after the death of Charles Gough, who fell from Striding Edge, Helvellyn in 1805. His body found below Red Tarn some months later by a shepherd, his body still being guarded by his Irish Terrier, Foxey. Nearby were discovered the bones of her dead puppies.
- The University of Notre Dame used an Irish Terrier as its mascot until the 1960s when it was replaced by the Notre Dame Leprechaun. The dogs had various names, the latest of which was Clashmore Mike. Two Irish Terriers are depicted in limestone on the east elevation of Alumni Hall.

== Irish Terrier in literature ==
"As I stood up, I saw that she was crying. ..."Oh, for heaven's sake, Pat ..." ...From all my experiences I knew that there was no one you could rely on and trust except your own self and, in the best case scenario, your friend.

...Of course, with us was it altogether a different matter but still, after all is said and done, Pat was also spending all her days staying at home alone. ..."A dog!" I said in surprise as it dawned on me "damn it, of course, a dogl You are straight to the point! With the dog one will never feel lonely!" ...It was a lovely, playful little doggie. Straight legs, square body, oblong head, intelligent and cheeky. ..."Do you know what you've got there?" Gustav asked me when we were outside. "Something really rare: an Irish terrier. Best of the best. Without a single blemish. And with a pedigree too."

..."I have to go and make my evening round right now. I would like you to come with me." ...Ward after ward it went on and on, room after room was it all the same: groaning, tormented bodies all around; motionless, almost dried-out human forms; a bunch of seemingly endless instances of misery, fear, surrender, pain, desperation, hope, distress. ..."Now you have seen for yourself that many of these people are much more worse off than Pat Hollmann. Some of them have got nothing left but their hope. Yet the majority are going to make it. ...You can't be sure of anything in advance. The hopelessly ill can pull it off and live much longer than the healthy one. Life is quite an amasing affair."

...I drove off. While on the Nikolaistraße, I suddenly remembered that I have completely forgotten about the dog. So I turned around and drove back to pick him up. ...The terrier sprang towards me, sniffed me and licked my hand. His eyes shone green in the oblique light that was coming from the street. ...I took the dog which was cuddling warmly towards me and went away. Compliantly, with the long soft steps, he was walking along by my side to the car. ...The dog quickly pulled away and, passing between my legs, ran barking across our room. "Good heavens!" Pat exclaimed. "This is a real Irish Terrier!" ...She was breathlessly happy with the joy." - From the "Three Comrades" novel by Erich Maria Remarque

== See also ==
- List of dog breeds
