= Soft-coated Wheaten Terrier =

Wheaten Terrier
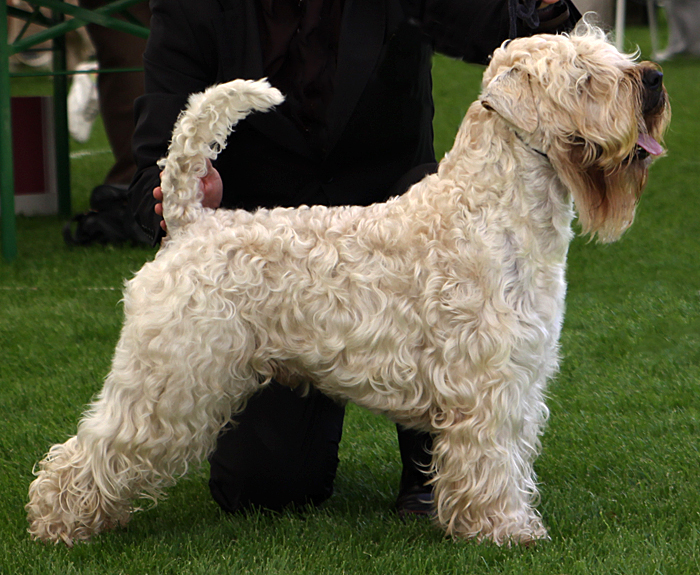
- Soft-coated Wheaten Terrier standing at a conformation dog show
- Other names: Irish Soft-Coated Wheaten Terrier and variant spellings: "Soft Coated" and "Softcoated"
- Common nicknames: Wheaten or Wheatie
- Origin: Ireland
Traits
Height	Males	45 to 50 cm (18 to 20 inches)
	Females	43 to 46 cm (17 to 18 inches)
Weight	Males	14–20 kg (31–44 lb)
	Females	13.6–15.9 kg (30–35 lb)
- Coat: Soft and silky, loosely waved or curly
- Color: Wheaten or ginger
- Litter size: up to 8
Kennel club standards
- Irish Kennel Club: standard
- Fédération Cynologique Internationale: standard

The soft-coated Wheaten Terrier (Irish: An Brocaire Buí – literally, "Yellow Terrier") is a pure-breed terrier originating from Ireland. Wheatens typically have one of two coat types: Irish or Heavy (American). The Irish coat is generally silkier and wavier than the Heavy, or American coat, which is thicker and fuller. The Soft Coated Wheaten Terrier is named for its silky, wheat-colored coat. Wheatens are generally friendly and playful, and tend to get along well with children and other dogs.

== History ==
The Wheaten was bred in Ireland for over two hundred years to be an all-purpose farm dog whose duties included herding, watching and guarding livestock, and vermin hunting and killing. They share a common ancestry with the Kerry Blue Terrier and the Irish Terrier but were not owned by gentry. In Ireland, they were commonly referred to as the "Poor Man's Wolfhound." The Soft-Coated Wheaten Terrier received the nickname "Poor Man’s Wolfhound" because people in Ireland were prohibited from owning hunting dogs such as Irish Wolfhounds or Beagles. So, folks bred the Wheaten Terrier as a versatile farm and guard dog instead. Wheaten Terriers used to be docked to avoid taxes and were often kept to a specific size.

Despite its long history, the Wheaten was not recognized as a breed in Ireland by the Irish Kennel Club until 1937. In 1943, the British Kennel Club recognized the breed in the UK as well. The first Wheatens were exported to Lydia Vogel in the United States in the 1940s, but serious interest in the breed took another ten years to develop. The Soft Coated Wheaten Terrier Club of America, Inc. was established in 1962, seven years after the formation of The Soft Coated Wheaten Terrier Club of Great Britain. In the 1970s, the first Wheatens were imported into Australia by Anubis Kennels. In 1973, they were recognized by the American Kennel Club. The recent importation of Irish-style dogs has improved and broadened the gene pool. The American Herding Breed Association (AHBA) accepted the Wheaten in the 1990s at which point members of the breed were allowed to participate in its herding capability tests and trials. Today, Wheatens compete in obedience, agility, and tracking and are occasionally used in animal-assisted therapy as well. The Soft Coated Wheaten Terrier Club of America, Inc. (SCWTCA, Inc.) is a member of the American Kennel Club which protects and advances the interests of the breed and guards against commercial exploitation. It serves breeders, owners, competition organizers and prospective owners.

== Appearance ==
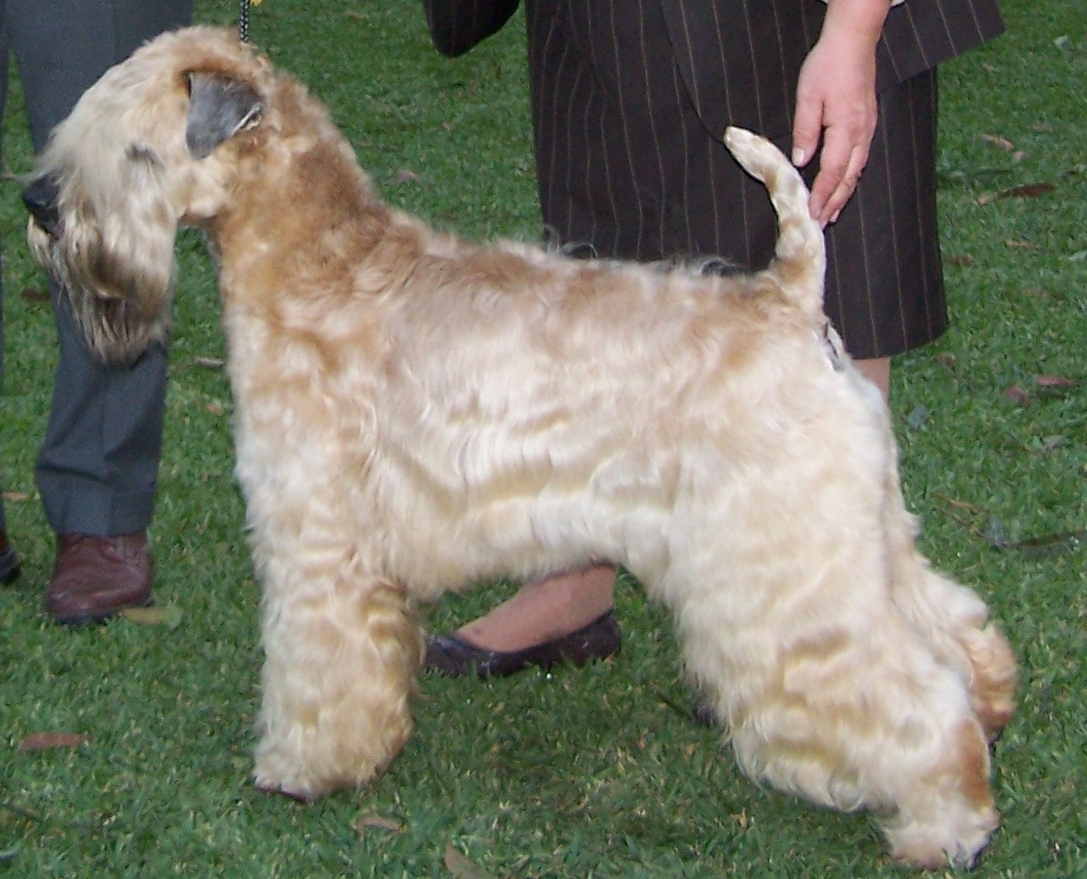
Australian Grand Champion Wheaten

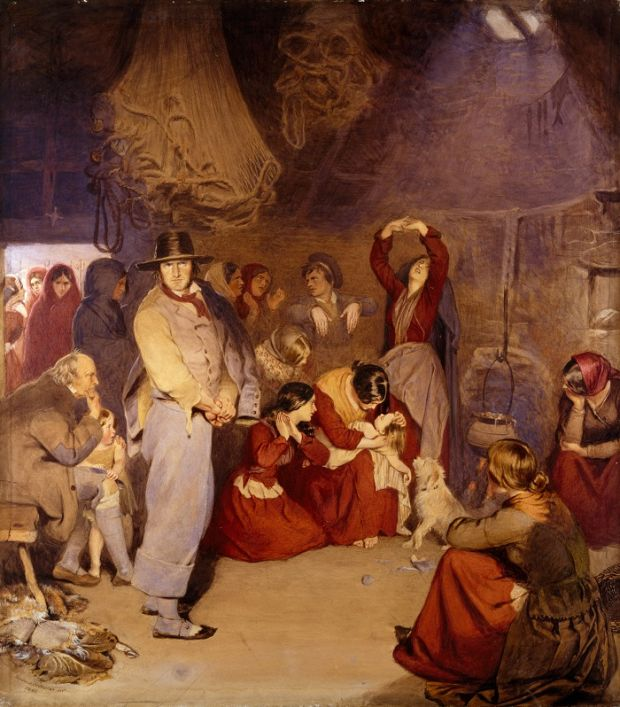
The Aran Fisherman's Drowned Child, by Frederic William Burton, 1841

Puppies have dark coats of red, brown, mahogany or white. Their muzzles and ears may be black or dark brown. The reddish-brown puppy coat gradually grows out to nearly white before maturing into a wheaten-colored coat as they get older. The adult coat typically matures by 3 years old and may contain black, white, or darker brown "guard" hairs in addition to the lighter wheaten colored hair. If adults ever have skin injuries, the resulting hair growth (wound hair) will be the dark color of their puppy coat before it eventually grows out to the wheat color. It may also come out to a molten chocolate color, either white or milky colored fur .

The Soft-coated Wheaten Terrier is a medium-sized dog, which ranges on average from 17 to 20 inches (43 to 51 cm) in height and about 30 to 45 pounds (14 to 20 kg) in weight. The breed has a square structure and is well built. Their soft, silky hair does not shed like most dogs; like human hair and Poodle hair, it keeps growing; they do need trimming and should be brushed and combed once a day to avoid mats. They are very smart dogs, and are easy to train. They respond the best to praise and learning tricks can come very easily to them. They love people, and they rarely have aggression issues if obtained from a reputable breeder.

The Irish coat tends to be thinner and silkier than the American variety and it has a devoted following in Ireland and Europe. Breeders of the pure Irish type believe this is the original working coat. The coat is not thin – breeders of the Irish type consider the American heavy coat to be "bouffant", not that of the original working terrier type. There are a few breeders of the Irish type in the US and Canada. In the AKC conformation show ring, the judges do not always accept the Irish type well. The Irish is well received in the UK and Europe. The "Heavy Irish" coat is usually a result of cross-breeding between coat types – American/English coat with an Irish type. The Irish coat still requires daily brushing to stay free of matted hair.

The Wheatens seen in Ireland today are of the same size, shape, and coat texture as those seen and documented well over 100 years ago. Evidence of this can be seen from the famous artwork "The Aran Fisherman's Drowned Child" by the Irish painter Frederic William Burton.

== Health ==
A 2024 UK study found a life expectancy of 13.7 years for the breed compared to an average of 12.7 for purebreeds and 12 for crossbreeds.

Soft-coated Wheaten Terriers are a long-lived breed. Like all dogs, they are susceptible to various heritable diseases, although are most known for two protein wasting conditions: protein-losing nephropathy (PLN), where the dogs lose protein via the kidneys; and protein-losing enteropathy (PLE), where the dogs fail to fully absorb protein in their digestive tracts, causing it to pass in their stool. Both PLN and PLE are potentially fatal, but if caught early enough, can sometimes be managed with strict dietary changes and pharmaceuticals. Laboratory tests can aid in diagnosing PLN and PLE; Wheaten owners should check their country's advised testing protocols. Research suggests that PLE and PLN often are more prevalent in female wheatens and often happen in concurrence, with PLE following diagnosis of PLN. While a genetic predisposition has been suggested, an unknown mode of inheritance remains. Research programs, mainly in the United States and the United Kingdom, are looking for answers.

Other Wheaten health issues are renal dysplasia, inflammatory bowel disease, Addison's disease, and cancer. Some Wheatens can suffer from food and environmental allergies, and can be prone to developing the skin disease atopic dermatitis. Potential owners of Wheaten Terriers should discuss health issues with a breeder before deciding to get a puppy.

== Temperament ==
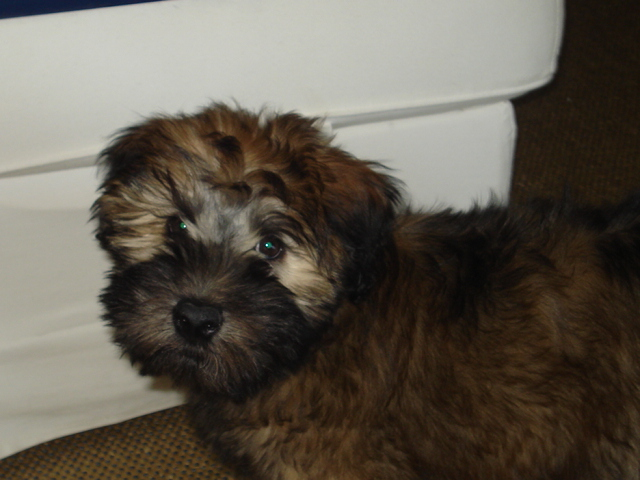
Soft-coated Wheaten Terrier puppy

The Soft-coated Wheaten Terrier is an energetic and playful dog. It requires patience and consistent positive training. Harsh methods will often result in fear and/or aggression. A positive, even-handed approach works best with this intelligent yet headstrong terrier. It is an enthusiastic greeter, and will often jump up to lick a person's face, commonly referred to as the "Wheaten greetin". Wheatens are considered less scrappy than other terriers, but are lively and can be more active than many other breeds. For this reason these dogs do best when they are exercised regularly.

They are cool-weather dogs and can become easily overheated in hot weather. If socialised with cats and puppies, they may get along fine with them; if not, care should be taken in introducing them to cats, as the breed has a very strong "prey drive" because of its vermin-hunting origin. Wheatens are friendly and loving pets, and get along well with other dogs if properly socialised. Wheatens are very protective of their families and, although they may bark in alert at strangers, they rarely become aggressive. If not properly trained they can bark excessively. Many Wheaten owners thus say they make great watch dogs, but poor guard dogs. Wheatens are a great dog for children and are generally friendly towards them. Wheatens are very curious and will most likely try to wander if left outside alone. If well trained they can become very loyal and will listen very well to commands.

== See also ==
- List of dog breeds
