= Kerry Blue Terrier =

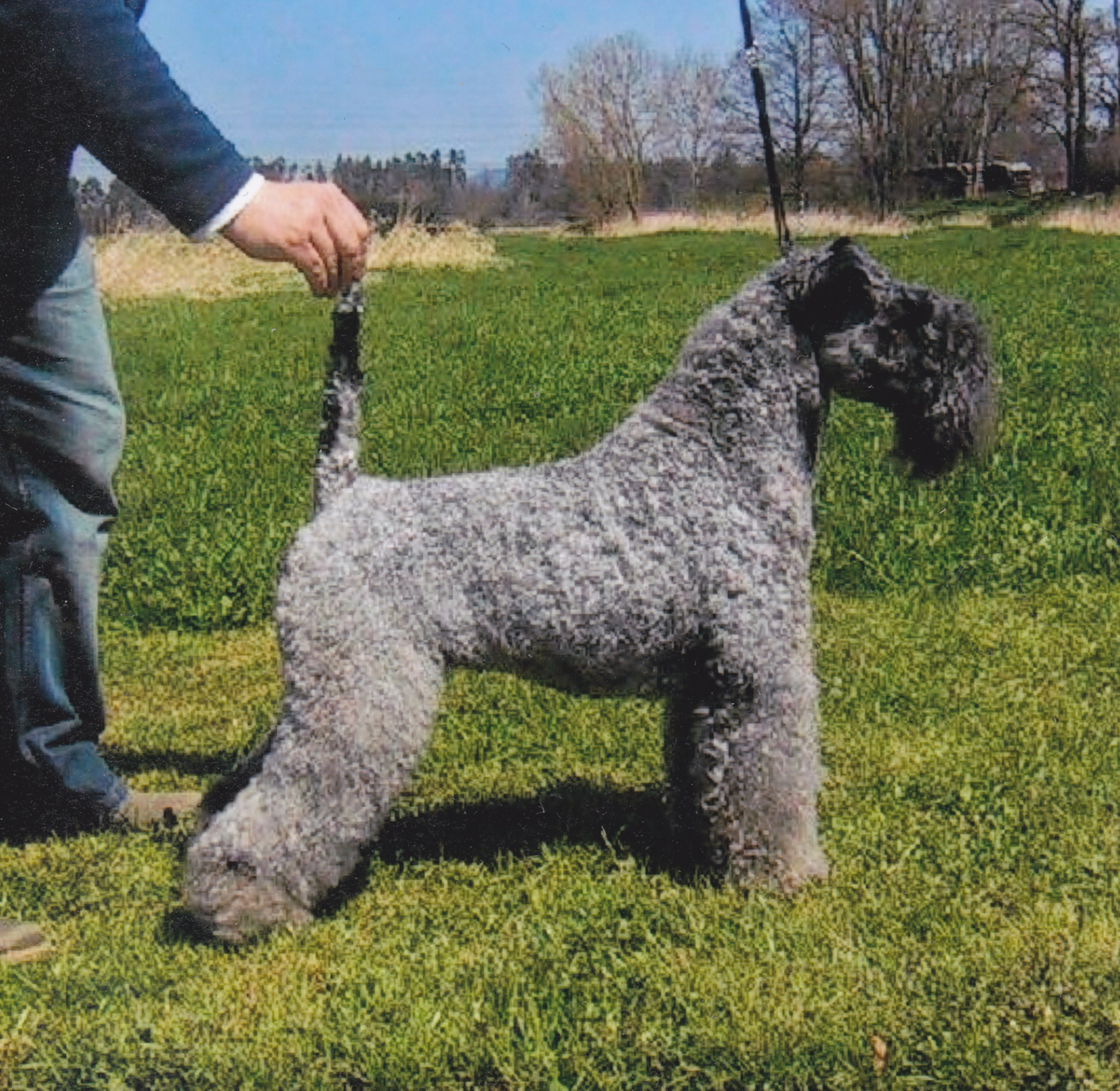
- A Kerry Blue Terrier
- Other names: Irish Blue Terrier
- Common nicknames: Kerry
- Origin: Ireland
Traits
Height	Males	46–48 cm (18–19 in)
	Females	44–46 cm (17–18 in)
Weight	Males	12–15 kg (26–33 lb)
	Females	10–13 kg (22–29 lb)
Kennel club standards
- Irish Kennel Club: standard
- Fédération Cynologique Internationale: standard

The Kerry Blue Terrier or Irish Blue Terrier (Irish: An Brocaire Gorm) is an Irish breed of dog of terrier type. It was originally bred to control vermin including rats, rabbits, badgers, ferrets, foxes, otters, hares, deer and wolves, but later became a general working dog used for a variety of jobs including herding cattle and sheep.

A Kerry Blue won "Best In Show" at Crufts in 2000. In the twenty-first century it is an endangered breed.

== History ==
The Kerry Blue is first documented in 1847, when it was described as bluish slate in colour, marked with darker blotches and patches, and often with black about the legs and muzzle. These dogs were supposedly more common in Kerry, but were also seen elsewhere.

With the development of dog shows in the late nineteenth and early twentieth centuries, the breed became standardised and "tidied up" for the show ring. The Irish nationalist leader Michael Collins owned a famous Kerry Blue named Convict 224. Collins even made an attempt to have the Kerry Blue adopted as the national dog of Ireland.

The first show of the Dublin Irish Blue Terrier Club took place outside official curfew hours and was entered both by those fighting for and against an Irish republic. The Dublin Irish Blue Terrier Club was so successful it led directly to the foundation of the Irish Kennel Club, and a Kerry Blue was the first dog that club registered.

In the early days of competitive dog showing, the Irish Kennel Club required that dogs pass a "gameness" test – known as Teastas Mor certification – to become eligible for showing.

== Characteristics ==
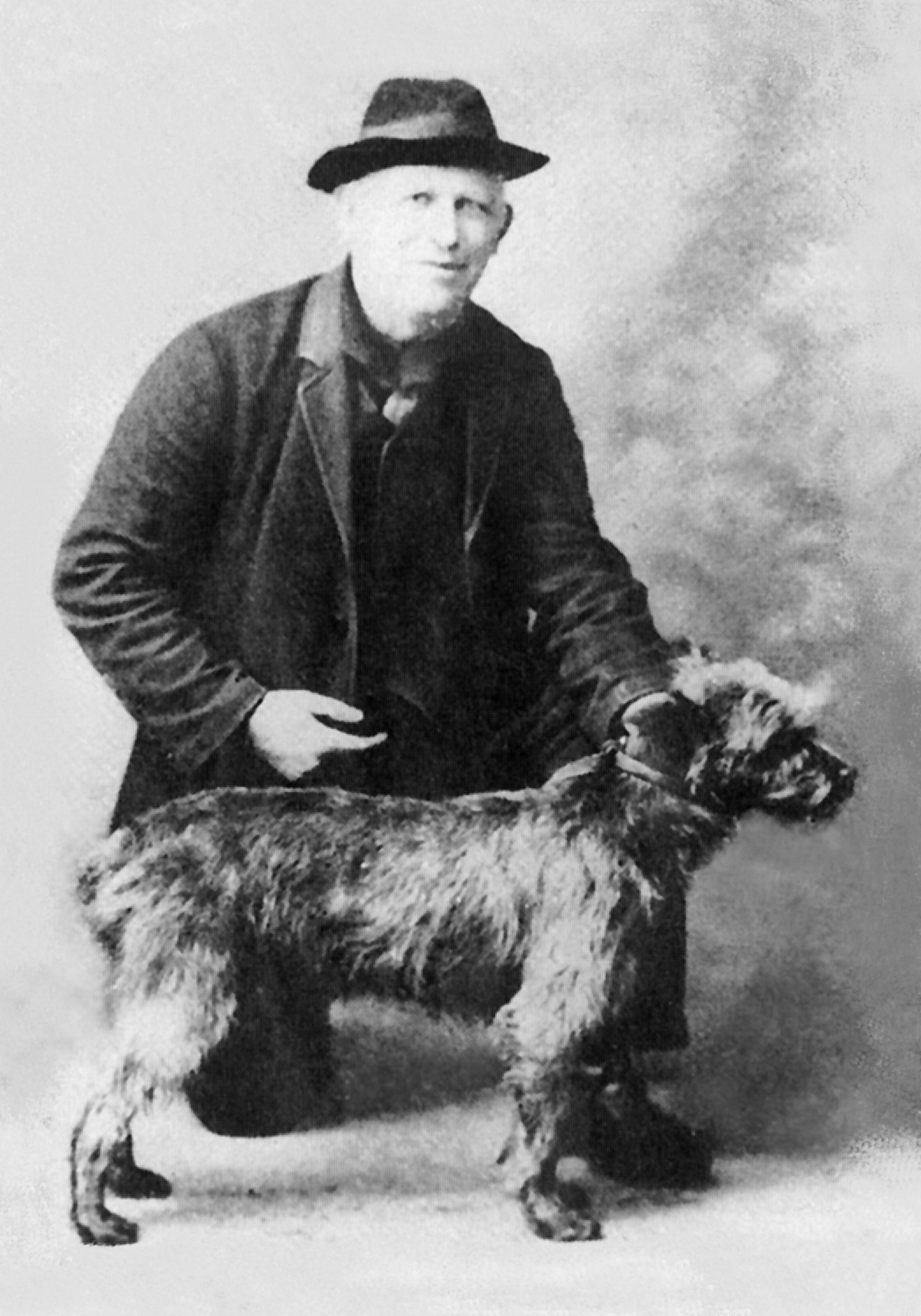
Philip Doyle with his dog, "Terri", at the Killarney Show, 1916.

Some characteristics of the Kerry Blue Terrier include a long head, flat skull and a deep chest. Dogs usually stand about 46–48 cm (18–19 in) at the withers and weigh some 12–15 kg (26–33 lb); bitches stand about 44–46 cm (17–18 in) and weigh 10–13 kg (22–29 lb).

The coat is thick, soft and wavy. It may be any shade of blue, either with or without black points.

=== Health ===
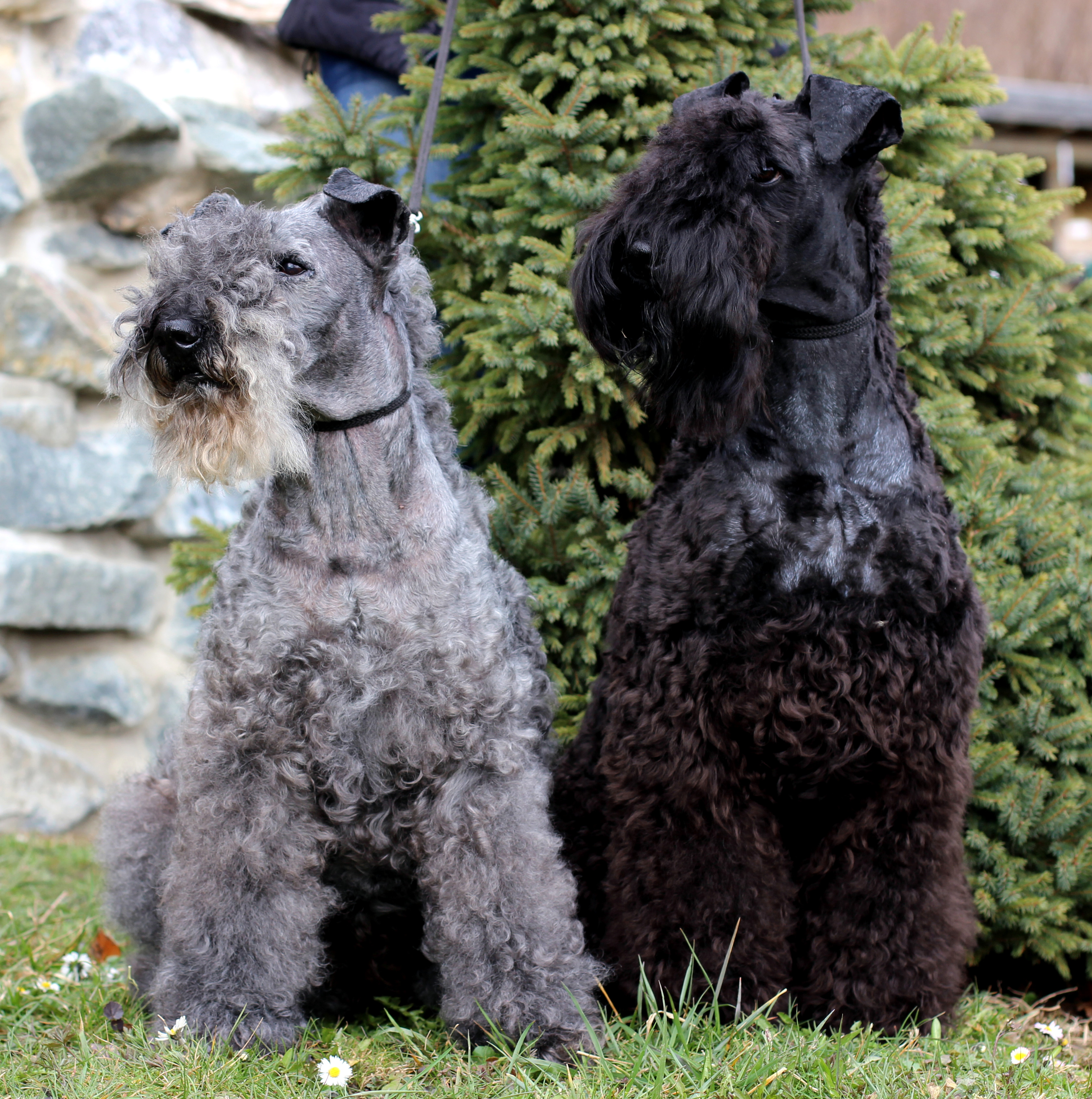
On the left, a 14-year-old

Spiculosis is a painful condition that causes follicular hyperkeratosis. This condition is only found in the Kerry Blue Terrier. The breed is predisposed to footpad keratosis and hair follicle tumors.

A 2024 UK study found a median lifespan of 12.4 years for the breed, compared to an overall average of 12.5.
