= Earthdog trial =

Dog sport

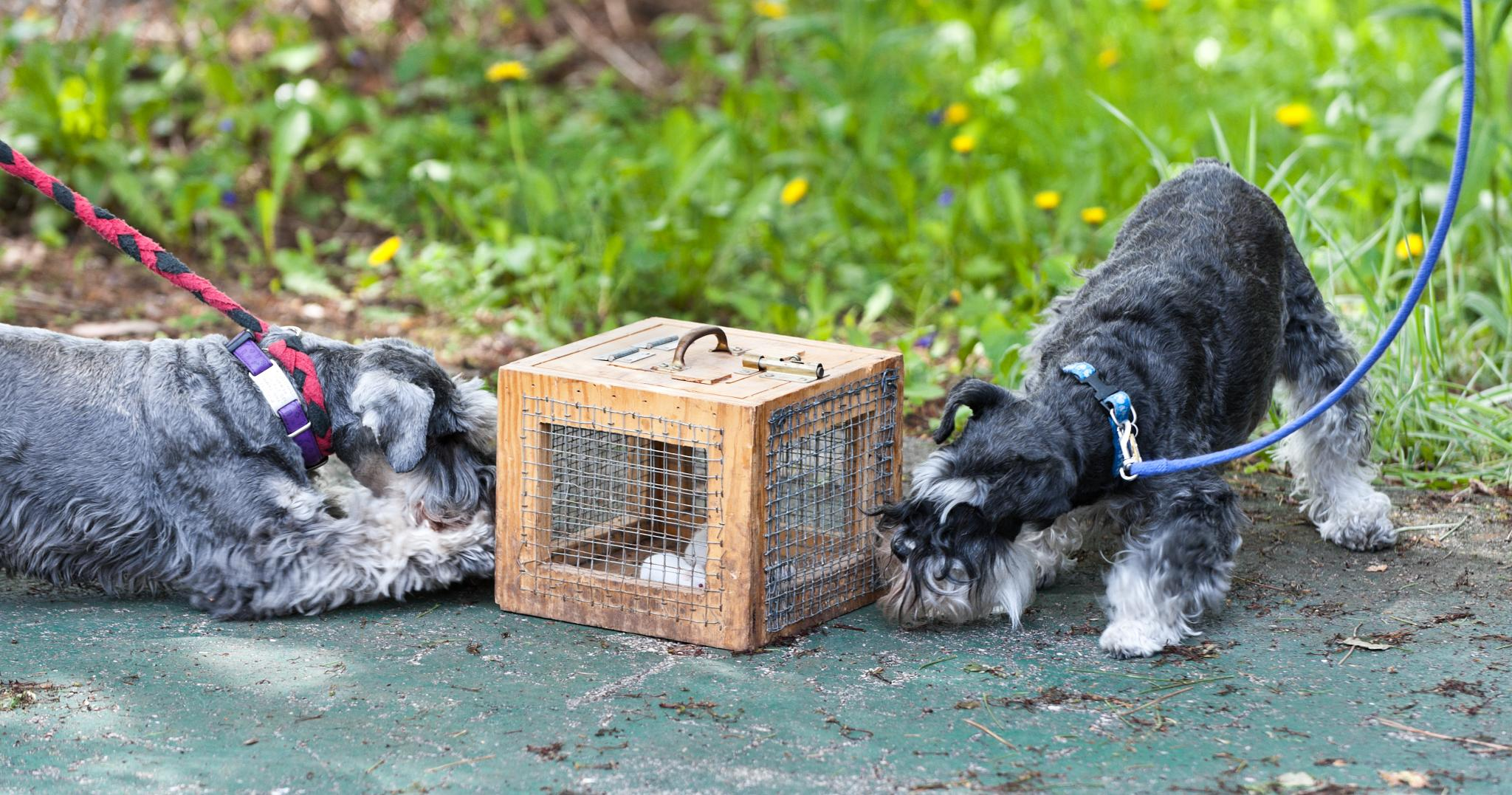
Two terriers sniffing the quarry at an earthdog trial

An earthdog test or earthdog trial tests the working ability and instinct of the small, often short-legged terriers or Dachshunds. These dogs were bred to hunt vermin and other quarry which lived in underground dens. Earthdog den tests involve human-made tunnels that the dogs must navigate, while scenting a rat, "the quarry". The dog must follow the scent to the quarry and then "work" the quarry. Depending on the sanctioning organization, "working" means barking, scratching, staring, pawing, digging; any active behavior. The quarry is protected at all times by wooden bars across the end of the tunnel. The hunting encounter is controlled, and neither the dog nor the quarry (usually two rats) are endangered by the activity.

In Canada, earthdog tests are sanctioned by the Canadian Kennel Club (CKC). In the United States, two major organizations sanction earthdog tests: the American Kennel Club (AKC) and the American Working Terrier Association (AWTA). In the European Union, earthdog trials have been illegal since May 1992 under the stipulations of the European Convention for the Protection of Pet Animals, which legally classifies the activity as a form of dog fighting.

== AKC earthdog tests ==
AKC earthdog tests are intended as noncompetitive venues in which the handlers may gauge their dog's natural hunting aptitude when presented with an underground hunting situation. According to the AKC General Regulations for Earthdog Tests, the noncompetitive program begins with a basic introduction to den work and quarry, progressing through gradual steps to the point where the dog can demonstrate that it is willing to perform the required tasks, including seeking its quarry and working it underground.

=== Eligibility ===
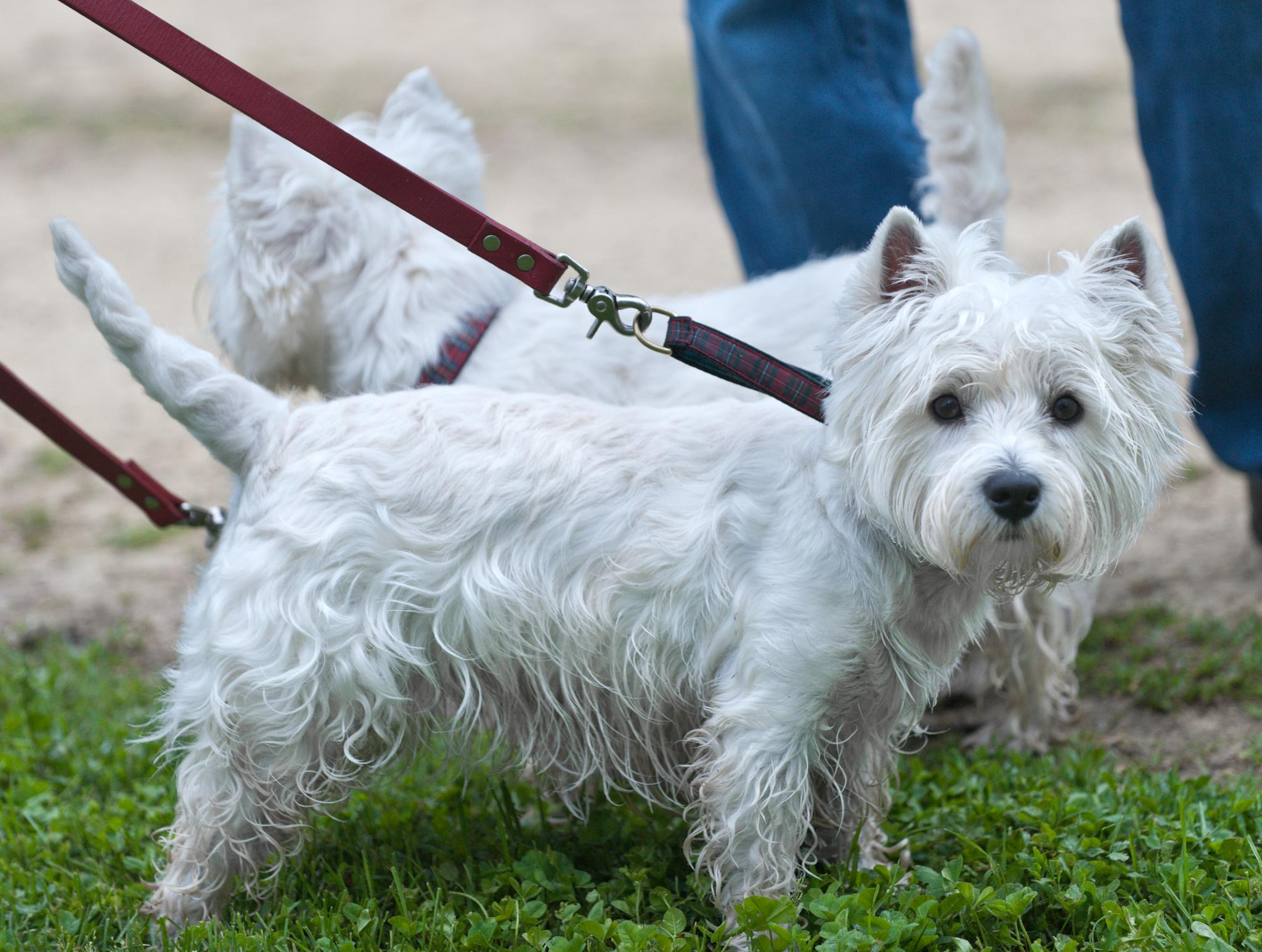
West Highland White Terriers at an earthdog trial

Dogs that are registered with the AKC and are six months of age or older may participate in AKC Earthdog tests. They do not need to be intact, and purebred dogs that have been assigned "Indefinite Listing Privilege" (ILP) numbers, may also participate. In comparison to the American Working Terrier Association (AWTA) tests, fewer breeds are permitted in AKC tests, with mixed breeds being excluded altogether. The following breeds are classified as eligible to participate in AKC Earthdog tests:

- American Hairless Terrier
- Australian Terrier
- Bedlington Terrier
- Border Terrier
- Cairn Terrier
- Cesky Terrier
- Dachshund
- Dandie Dinmont Terrier
- Glen of Imaal Terrier
- Jagdterrier
- Lakeland Terrier
- Manchester Terrier
- Miniature Bull Terrier
- Miniature Pinscher
- Miniature Schnauzer
- Norfolk Terrier
- Norwich Terrier
- Parson Russell Terrier
- Rat Terrier
- Russell Terrier
- Scottish Terrier
- Sealyham Terrier
- Silky Terrier
- Skye Terrier
- Smooth Fox Terrier
- Welsh Terrier
- West Highland White Terrier
- Wire Fox Terrier
- Yorkshire Terrier

=== Program ===
AKC earthdog tests differ from AWTA trials in that the AKC program is broken down into several more levels of increasing difficulty:

Introduction To Quarry (IQ I and IQ II)
Dogs that have never competed at an earthdog test will need to be introduced to the quarry. Dogs have different levels of prey drive and some need more encouragement than others. The Introduction to Quarry is simply designed to acquaint a dog with "going to ground", following a scent trail and "working a rat". At this stage, the dog is asked to negotiate a 10-foot (3.0 m) tunnel with a single right-angle turn. At the end of the tunnel is a rat in a cage, which is placed behind dowel bars. The handler may talk to their dog and encourage the dog to "work" the rat. The judge may also attempt to interest the dog by shaking the quarry cage, by tapping or scratching the cage or the tunnel itself, or by making other noises.

Junior Earthdog (JE)
Junior Earthdog (JE) is the first level of competition in which a title may be earned. A Junior Earthdog tunnel 30 ft (9.1 m) long and has three right-angle turns, is set into the earth and is completely dark. The entrance is well-scented with rat smells. The dog is released 10 feet from the tunnel entrance, after which it has 45 seconds to enter the tunnel and traverse the tunnel to reach the quarry. The dog must then begin to work the quarry within 30 seconds of reaching it, and most continue to work without interruption for 60 seconds. After that time has elapsed, the dog must then allow the handler to remove it from the tunnel via a hatch at the quarry end. The handler is permitted to give the dog one command when releasing the dog or before it enters the tunnel, but otherwise must remain quiet at the release point until the time of retrieval. To earn a JE title, the dog must successfully pass the JE test twice under two different judges.

Senior Earthdog (SE)
To pass a Senior Earthdog (SE) test, a dog must accomplish the following: Follow a 20-foot-long (6.1 m) scent line to a tunnel entrance that the dog cannot see from ground level; track through a completely dark 30 ft (9.1 m) tunnel containing three 90 degree turns to the rats; not be distracted by a false entrance/exit arrangement; not be distracted by a dead end tunnel that is scented with rat bedding; once at the rats, work the rats for 90 seconds (working is defined as barking, digging, scratching, biting the bars); after working the rats, and after the rats are removed from the tunnel, leave the tunnel when called by the handler and return to the handler within 90 seconds. To earn an SE title, a dog must receive three qualifying scores from two different judges after previously earning their JE title.

Master Earthdog (ME)
Master Earthdog is the most difficult test in the AKC Earthdog program. For each test, two dogs are drawn at random. The dogs hunt together as a brace on open land starting from a distance of 100 to 300 yd (91 to 274 m) from the tunnel entrance. Along the way they encounter a "false den" scented to seem used by quarry but with no quarry inside, which they must investigate at their handler's command without indicating a quarry present. The hunting party proceeds in the direction of the tunnel, but the handlers must stop short of the tunnel and may not show the dogs where the tunnel is. Each dog must search for quarry in that area until they discover the tunnel entrance and actively indicate where it is and that quarry is present. After both dogs have indicated the presence of quarry, one of the dogs is sent into the tunnel while the other brace dog is tethered to a ground stake about 10 ft (3.0 m) away from the tunnel entrance.
A Master Earthdog tunnel is 30 ft (9.1 m) to 40 ft (12 m) long with three right-angle turns. The dog will encounter a false den and false exit similar to a Senior Earthdog tunnel, and also must pass through a constriction and a roller that simulate roots and other obstacles in a natural tunnel. The dog in the tunnel must reach the quarry within 90 seconds. Once at the quarry, the dog must begin to work the rats within 15 seconds and must work them continuously for 90 seconds. They must not be distracted from working by the judge scraping or digging alongside the tunnel. The scraping is meant to approximate the hunter digging down to the spot where the dog is holding the quarry at bay. The handler has 15 seconds to remove the dog from the tunnel after their 90 seconds of work is complete. After the first dog has completed the tunnel portion of the test, the dogs trade roles. Each dog is judged on how well they "honor" a hunt by the other dog while tied to the stake: The honoring dog must show interest but must not make enough noise to interfere with the judge listening to hear the dog working in the tunnel. Four passes under three different judges is required for a Master Earthdog title.

Endurance Earthdog (EE)
An Endurance Earthdog test is intended to demonstrate the consistency of a hunting earthdog. A dog earns a pass performance in Endurance Earthdog by completing both the SE test and ME test during the same earthdog trial event. A dog who passes both tests during five different earthdog events is awarded an Endurance Earthdog title. An Endurance Earthdog may continue to compete to earn as many Endurance titles as they can, with each subsequent title suffixed with a numeric designation.

== AWTA earthdog den trials ==
The AWTA predates the AKC earthdog program and was founded to promote and test the working abilities of terriers and dachshunds.

AWTA hopes to encourage breeders to retain the hunting instincts which make these breeds so characteristically ‘terrier.’ Without the opportunity to test the instincts so vital to these breeds, dachshunds and terriers would cease to be the working dogs they were meant to be — something already too common with many terrier breeds selected for showing alone.

The AWTA awards Certificates of Gameness to terriers and Dachshunds who achieve a score of 100% in the AWTA open class. To qualify in the open class, a dog must be released near the trial's 30-foot (9.1 m) earth tunnel opening, find its way into the tunnel and reach the quarry, all within 30 seconds (50% of score) and then "work" the rat continuously for a full 60 seconds (remaining 50% of score). Timing starts from the moment the dog is released by the handler. The dog may enter the tunnel and come out or walk around the tunnel, but it must get to the rat within the time allotted. However, once it reaches the rat, it must remain with it for the aforementioned 60 seconds.

The following breeds are recognized (and therefore able to compete) in AWTA den trials:

- Australian Terrier
- Bedlington Terrier
- Border Terrier
- Cairn Terrier
- Cesky Terrier
- Dachshund
- Dandie Dinmont Terrier
- Fell Terrier
- Wire Fox Terrier
- Smooth Fox Terrier
- Glen of Imaal Terrier
- Jack Russell Terrier
- Jagdterrier
- Lakeland Terrier
- Norwich Terrier
- Norfolk Terrier
- Patterdale Terrier
- Scottish Terrier
- Sealyham Terrier
- Skye Terrier
- Welsh Terrier
- West Highland White Terrier

Other small terrier breeds may compete in the miscellaneous class.

== See also ==
- Teastas Mor
- Working terrier
