= Black and Tan Terrier =

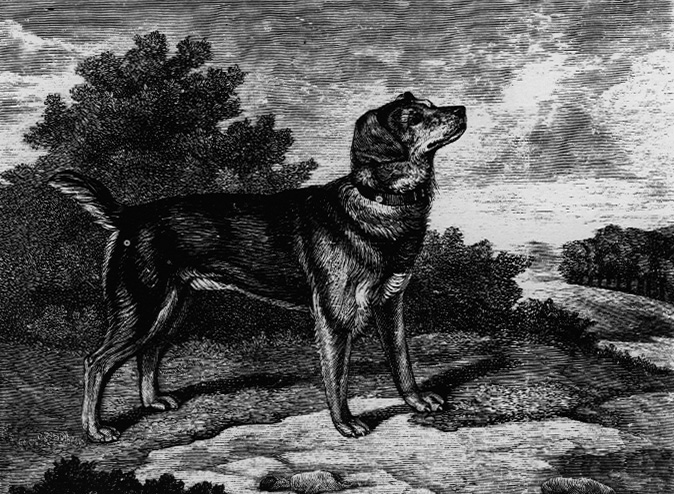
- Other names: Old English Black and Tan Terrier; Broken Coated Working Terrier; Rough Coated Black and Tan Terrier; Old Working Terrier; Old English Terrier
- Origin: Wales and England
- Breed status: Extinct
Traits
- Weight: 9–20 lb (4.1–9.1 kg)
- Coat: Usually wire-haired, could be smooth or woolly
- Colour: Any combination of black, tan, red, blue, brown, sandy, grizzle, liver or white
- Notes: Fell terrier breeds and the Welsh Terrier descend from the Black and tan terrier

The Black and Tan Terrier was a broad breed or type of terrier that was one of the earliest terrier breeds. Although it is now extinct, it is believed to be the ancestor of all modern Fell Terrier breeds and the Welsh Terrier, a breed recognised by The Kennel Club.

== History ==
Working Fell Terriers (non-Kennel Club working terriers from the rocky Lakeland Fells region of the UK) have always been quite variable, but have always been coloured terriers (tan, black or black and tan), as opposed to the white-coated "foxing terriers" preferred in the south of England.

From the coloured rough-coated Fell Terriers of Cumberland, Westmorland and the Scottish Borders were developed several Kennel Club breeds, including the Lakeland Terrier, the Welsh Terrier, and the Border Terrier.

== See also ==
- List of dog breeds
- List of extinct dog breeds
- Tiny the Wonder, famous 19th century black and tan terrier.
