= Gameness =

Quality of dog breeds

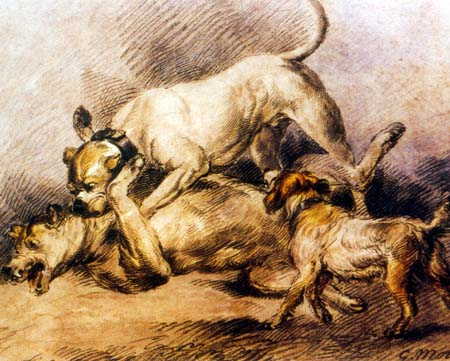
Fighting Dogs by George Morland, circa 1800

Game or gameness is a trait most often attributed to fighting dogs, working terriers, and fighting cocks that are selectively bred, referring to their ability to persevere in a fight even when losing. Dogs that demonstrate this trait can also be described as "ready and willing", "full of fight", "spirited", or "plucky", and are able to resist mental and physical challenges in order to win a fight. Gameness contrasts with prey drive insofar as gameness refers to a dog's motivation to fight other dogs, and prey drive refers to a dog's motivation to hunt prey.

The factors that produce gameness are not well understood. Though the selective pressures involved in breeding dogs for dogfighting appear to be a significant component of gameness, dogfighters disagree about the importance of genetics to the trait. While dogs that exhibit a high degree of gameness are more prone to have offspring who are also game, the inheritance of the trait is not consistent.

== Dog fighting breeds ==
In dog fighting pitbulls bred for gameness are valued as the ability to not quit, despite injury, dehydration, exhaustion or broken bones. As one writer describes it, "Game is the dog that won't quit fighting, the dog that'll die in the ring, the dog that'll fight with two broken legs." The scope and method of training to develop a game dog varies dramatically depending on the level and experience of the dog-fighter. Most "gamebred" dogs have a high pain threshold.

== Working terriers ==
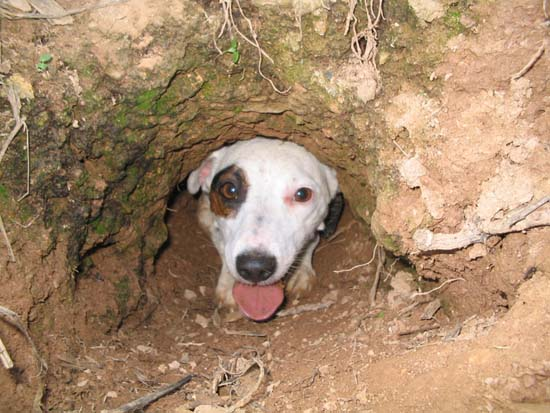
A working Jack Russell Terrier exits a den pipe.

Pertaining to working terriers and other small hunting dogs, earthdog trials are used to determine the dog's gameness in hunting dangerous pest species underground. The American Working Terrier Association currently offers a Certificate of Gameness (CG) title which is more of a basic prey drive test. All working terriers, including but not limited to: Bedlington Terrier, Cairn Terrier, Dandie Dinmont Terrier, Fox Terrier, Glen of Imaal Terrier, Jack Russell Terrier, Patterdale Terrier, Plummer Terrier, Rat Terrier, Scotch Terrier, Sealyham Terrier and Skye Terrier display gameness.

== See also ==
- Dog aggression
- Dog behaviourist
- Instinct
- Prey drive
