= Jagdterrier =

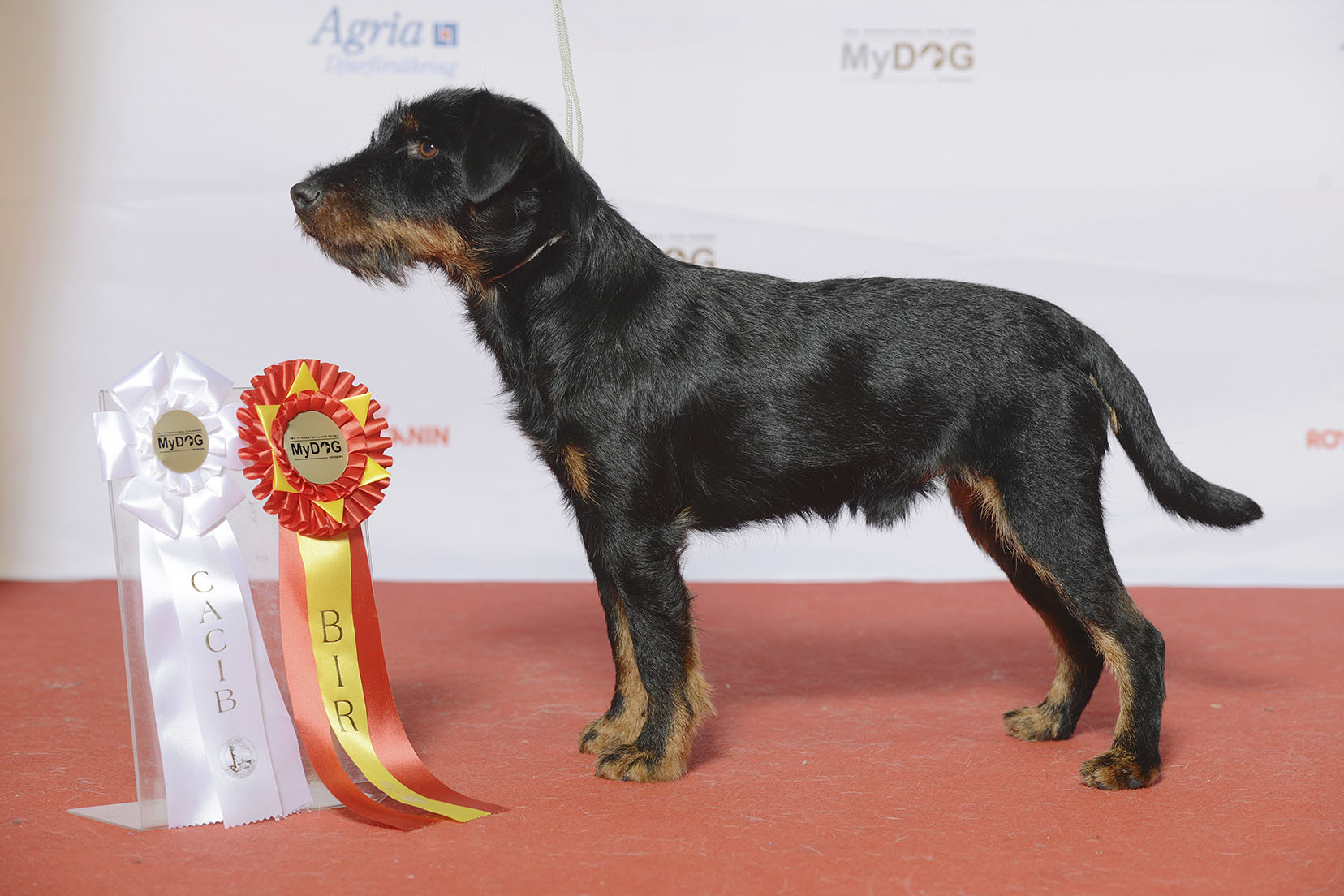
- Rough-coated Jagdterrier
- Other names: Deutscher Jagdterrier; German Jagdterrier; German Hunting Terrier; German Hunt Terrier
- Origin: Germany
Traits
Height	Males	33–40 cm (13–16 in)
	Females	33–40 cm (13–16 in)
Weight	Males	9–10 kg (20–22 lb)
	Females	7.5–8.5 kg (17–19 lb)
- Coat: Thick and abundant.
- Colour: Black, dark-brown or greyish-black, with fawn (yellow-red) clearly defined markings at the eyebrows, muzzle, chest, the legs and at the base of the tail.
Kennel club standards
- VDH: standard
- Fédération Cynologique Internationale: standard

The Jagdterrier (/ˈjɑːktɛriər/ YAHK-terr-i-ər) (English: Hunting Terrier) is a type of working terrier, originating in Germany, that is used for hunting quarry both above and underground. This breed of terrier is also called the German Hunt Terrier.

== Description ==
=== Appearance ===
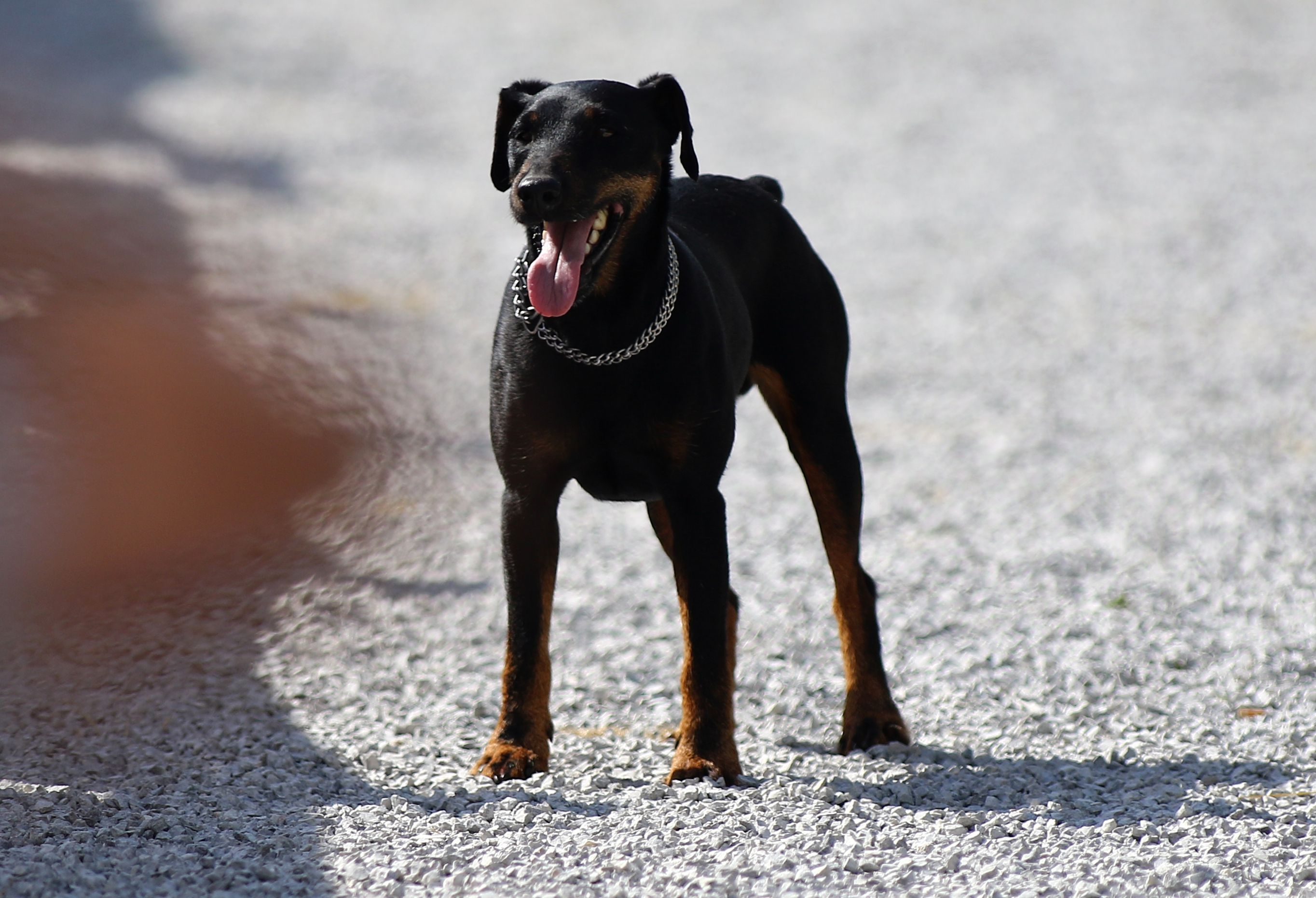
Smooth coat Jagdterrier with docked tail

A typical appearance of a Jagdterrier is black and tan, with the tan being more of a rust colour on the muzzle and undercarriage. It can also be chocolate or liver brown which are acceptable colours in the UKC/FCI breed standard. The breed standard calls for an animal that stands 33 to 40 centimetres (13 to 16 inches) at the shoulders, with females weighing from 7.5 to 8.5 kilograms (17 to 19 pounds), and males weighing from 9 to 10 kilograms (20 to 22 pounds). The coat of a Jagdterrier can be either hairy, smooth or broken. All varieties do shed. The tail is normally (but not always) docked at 2/3 the natural length.

=== Temperament ===
Jagdterriers were developed to be all-round hunting dogs. Though often used for quarry that dens underground, especially badger, fox, and raccoon, Jagdterriers are also used to drive wild boar and rabbits out of thickets, and to blood track wounded animals, such as deer. Due to their intelligence and adaptability, Jagdterriers can make good pets, but it should be remembered that they are primarily a hunting dog with a strong prey drive. Jagdterriers as highly driven, energetic working dogs that form strong bonds with their owners but require structured training due to their intensity.

== History ==
Between the two World Wars, game managers in Germany were focused on getting rid of foreign or introduced species, and bringing back now-extinct species that figured prominently in the mythology of the nation. One of the pioneers of this peculiar quest was Lutz Heck, the curator of the Berlin Zoo, who went on to "back breed" primitive cattle and horses to "recreate" the extinct aurochs (the kind of wild cattle seen in the cave paintings at Lascaux, France) and the tarpan (a kind of primitive forest pony). Heck's interest in dogs was driven in part by his passion for hunting, and in part by nationalism that was mixed with a desire to see what could be done with selective breeding.

Even as nationalism and an interest in genetic engineering were rising in Germany, terriers were also rising to the height of fashion in much of Europe and the United States. The Allied Terrier Show was taken over by Charles Crufts in 1886, and was the largest dog show in the world before World War I, while the first breed-specific dog publication anywhere was a magazine devoted to fox terriers. The Westminster Dog Show was begun in 1907, and the first winner was a fox terrier. A fox terrier won again in 1908, 1909, 1910, 1911, 1915, 1916, and 1917.

A fascination with terriers, nationalism, and genetic engineering were braided together when Lutz Heck presented four black-and-tan Fell terriers—similar to what we now would call a Patterdale Terrier—to Carl Eric Gruenewald and Walter Zangenbert. Gruenewald was a "cynologist" (a self-styled dog man with an interest in genetics) and Zangenbert was a hunter with an interest in fox terriers. Gruenewald and Zangenbert added to their team Chief Forester R. Fiess and Dr. Herbert Lackner, men with land for a kennel, and the financial means to support it over a decade-long quest.

An early problem was that the Black and Tan Terriers selected as the core breeding stock and deemed "ideal hunters" based on colour alone were, in fact, not all that great at hunting. As Gruenewald later wrote:

"We were glad to own fox terriers with the hunting color, and we hoped to use these four puppies successfully in breeding to establish a hunting fox terrier breed (jagdfoxterrier-stamm). From the viewpoint of hunting these four dogs were not bad, although they left much to desire. First we tried inbreeding, pairing brothers with sisters. But the results were not good. No wonder -- after all, the parents weren't real hunting dogs. The picture changed, though, when we bred our four 'originals' with our well-trained old hunting fox terriers. The beautiful dark color continued to be dominate. Dogs with a lot of the white color and spotted dogs were selected and eliminated from further breeding."

The breeding program for the Jagdterrier was massive in scale and unwavering in its selection criteria. At one point the men had 700 dogs in their kennels, and not a single dog was allowed to be placed outside of the kennel. Dogs that did not look the part, or which were deemed to be not of the quality desired, were culled (standard practice the world over until the 1960s). Early dogs were both smooth and rough coat, but the breeding program moved to get rid of smooth coats, and the coat of the final product can best be described as "slape coated"—a short, hard and wiry coat that sheds water and dirt while providing warmth in winter. After only 10 years time the dogs were breeding more-or-less true, with a Patterdale-like appearance, albeit with more red on the undercarriage.

The German Hunting Terrier Club (Deutscher Jagdterrier-Club) was founded in 1926, and the dog was warmly embraced in part because it fit well with the rising nationalistic sentiment within Germany at the time.

In 1938, a German by the name of Max Thiel Sr. bought his first Jagdterrier. Thiel hunted with this dog for only a few years before the start of World War II. During the war Thiel lost his dogs, but after the war he settled in Bavaria and purchased two female dogs, Asta and Naja.

In 1951 Thiel moved to the US, bringing with him Naja. He soon sent for Asta, who was bred and shipped pregnant. In 1954, Armin Schwarz Sr., imported a "champion" sire named Axel, and a few more litters were promulgated. In March 1956, nine Jagdterrier owners met in St. Louis, Missouri, and formed the Jagdterrier Club of America, with the expressed goal of getting the dog recognized by the American Kennel Club. In fact, the club did not prosper and eventually died out.

The Jagdterrier did not become popular in the US for several reasons, not the least of which was that in the US very few people hunt fox to ground. In recent years, with the rise of interest in terrier work in the US, new lines of Jagdterriers have been imported to the US, but most are used for above-ground or barn work due to their size. For a Jagdterrier to do well working underground in the US, it has to be at the absolutely smallest end of the breed standard or even undersized.

Many of the newer/later imports to the US are within the true FCI breed standard (correct size) and are being used successfully both above and below ground, with many reports of their offspring making exceptional hunting, flush and retrieval dogs both on land and in water. Today there are many hunters across the US adopting this breed as a hunt companion because of its versatility in various hunt disciplines and aim-to-please attitude.

== Health ==
The Jagdterrier is generally considered a robust and long-lived breed. According to breed guides, its typical lifespan is approximately 12–14 years. Although no major breed-specific health problems are widely reported, health screening is advised. Owners and breeders should monitor for inherited eye conditions such as primary lens luxation and maintain appropriate exercise and veterinary checks.

== See also ==
- List of dog breeds
