= Working terrier =

Terrier dog for hunting

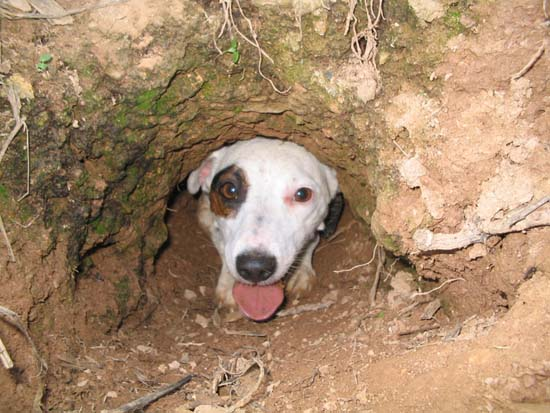
A working Jack Russell Terrier exits a den pipe.

A working terrier is a type of terrier dog bred and trained to hunt vermin including a badger, fox, rat and other small mammals. This may require the working terrier pursuing the vermin into an underground warren. These working dog breeds are neither bred primarily for a dog show nor as a companion dog, rather they are valued for their ability to hunt, endurance and gameness. Working terriers provide utility on farms, for pest control and organized hunting activities. A terrierman leads a pack of terriers when they are working.

According to the Oxford English Dictionary, the name terrier dates back to 1410 in the writings of Edward of Norwich, 2nd duke of York (1373 – 1415). The word terrier in Old French derives from the Latin terra, which means "earth". The term terrier meaning "earth dog" or "dog of the earth" was used in the Middle Ages with the connection to the dog's role of burrowing into the ground in pursuit of quarry, which eventually became the name of this group of hunting dogs.

With the growth in popularity of fox hunting in Britain in the 18th and 19th centuries, terriers were extensively bred to follow the red fox, as well as the Eurasian badger, into their burrows. This is referred to as "terrier work" or "going to ground". The purpose of the terrier is to locate the burrow of the prey animal, and then either intimidate it into leaving its burrow or hold the prey still so it can be killed or captured.

Working terriers can be no wider than the animals they hunt (chest circumference or "span" less than 35 cm or 14 inches) in order to fit into the burrows and still have room to maneuver.

Terrier work has been condemned by British animal welfare organizations, such as the League Against Cruel Sports, the International Fund for Animal Welfare, and the Royal Society for the Prevention of Cruelty to Animals, because it can lead to underground fighting between animals and cause serious injuries. The British National Working Terrier Federation denies that underground fighting is an issue, arguing that the terrier's role is to locate, bark, and flush out the hunted animals, not to attack them. Hunting below ground with terriers is largely illegal in Britain under the Hunting Act 2004, unless conducted by strict conditions intended to protect game birds. Hunting with working terriers for rats is legal in the United Kingdom. Terrier work is legal in Australia, Canada, South Africa, the United States and much of continental Europe.

== Requirements of a working terrier ==
The primary characteristic for a working terrier is that it has an owner or keeper who works it; a terrier is not a working terrier by virtue of its breeding alone.

The second most important quality of a working terrier is small chest size. Though the ideal chest size of a working terrier may depend on the size of the den pipe, smaller dogs generally do as well as or better than larger dogs. A small dog can get to the quarry without having to dig and arrives at the quarry without fatigue. Dogs that are too large will struggle to get past curves in the tunnel and will have to be dug every few feet. If a dog has to dig deep enough to where the tunnel tightens down, the dog will have to push dirt behind it to progress, which can result in the dog being "bottled" by dirt from behind. In such a situation, the dog will have a difficult time getting out on its own if it cannot turn around.

With two animals underground, a flow of air must be maintained to avoid asphyxiation. The more space a dog takes up in a burrow, the more the airflow will be constricted. In addition, a small dog has better maneuverability and can more easily avoid being bitten. Because of this, small dogs often receive less injury underground than larger dogs, which are more likely to find themselves jammed in a den pipe, face-to-face with the prey, and unable to move forward or backward.

Working terriers and tools for terrier work.

Other important requirements of a working terrier are essential gameness, a good nose, and the ability to problem-solve to avoid coming to harm underground.

== Terrier work as vermin control ==
A wide variety of game is hunted below ground with terriers, including red foxes, groundhogs (also known as woodchucks), raccoons, opossums, nutria (also known as coypu), and European and American badgers.

According to a 1994 survey by the British Association for Shooting and Conservation, 9% of foxes killed by UK gamekeepers were killed following the use of terriers.

Terrier work is not a very efficient way of hunting vermin, though in 2006, some 258 members of the Royal College of Veterinary Surgeons argued that it is a comparatively humane way to reduce fox numbers and is quite selective. Because of these characteristics, terrier work is considered an ideal way to control certain nuisance wildlife in farm countries.

The inefficiency of terrier work means that, unlike poisons and traps, there is no danger that a species can be wiped out over a large area and little chance that an adult will be terminated with an unseen young still in the den.

Though inefficient, a team of terriers, when coupled with an enthusiastic digger, can control red foxes, raccoons, and groundhogs on small farms where their presence might be a problem for chickens, geese, wild bird populations, and crop production. Because terrier work is selective, animals can be dispatched, or else they can be moved and relocated to nearby farms, forests, or waste areas where they will do no harm.

== Early history ==
Terrier work as it is known today began with the rise of the Enclosure Movement in the late 18th century in England. With enclosure, people were moved off the land and into cities and towns, and sheep and other livestock were moved into newly walled, hedged, and fenced fields. Vast expanses of enclosed open spaces proved perfect for mounted fox hunting, a sport that had arrived in the UK from France in the late 17th century.

The first mounted fox hunts were described by Sir Walter Scott, who also described the first working terriers in the UK. The first true breed of working terrier that bears a resemblance to what we see in the field today is the Jack Russell Terrier. The Jack Russell Terrier is named after the Reverend John Russell, whose long life (1795–1883) encompasses the entire early history of mounted fox hunts in the UK, and who is credited with breeding the first fox-working white-bodied terrier used in the field today.

With the rise of the Enclosure Movement in the late 18th and early 19th centuries came the control of sires and the rapid improvement in livestock herds. As breeds were improved, livestock shows were held to display these improvements. From these livestock shows grew the first dog shows.

The first dog show appeared in the UK in 1859, the same year that Charles Darwin's Origin of Species was first published. Both Darwin's book and the first dog show drew much of their inspiration from the rapid "speciation" of new livestock breeds that had first begun with Robert Bakewell's efforts to control sire selection. If livestock breeds could be rapidly "improved" through controlled breeding, clearly the same thing could be done with dogs.

Between 1800 and 1865, the number of dog breeds in the UK climbed from 15 to over 50, and it significantly increased further with the creation of The Kennel Club in 1873.

== Rootstock ==
Working terriers descend from two roots: colored dogs from the north (Scotland) and white dogs from the south (England and Wales). From these two roots spring a variety of Kennel Club dogs and every type of working terrier commonly found in the field today.

The "Fell Terrier" is the original non-pedigree-colored working dog of the north. From this diverse gene pool have sprung the Kennel Club Welsh Terrier, the Lakeland Terrier, and the Border Terrier. Today, only the Border Terrier is occasionally found in the field. This is not to say the working Fell Terrier has disappeared—it still exists by that name among working terrier enthusiasts.

Today's working Fell Terrier may be brown, black, red, or black and tan, and may be smooth, wire, or broken-coated. The dog may be called a Fell Terrier, a "working Lakeland", or a "Patterdale Terrier". A German variety of the Fell Terrier is called the "Jagdterrier", but the standard for this dog is on the large size, and, as a consequence, it is most useful in large pipes, artificial earth, or when it has been bred down to a 30–33 cm (12–13-inch) size.

From the southern part of England have come the white fox-working dogs, whose origins are the same as those of the Jack Russell Terrier. Kennel Club breeds derived from these mainly white-coated dogs include the Smooth Fox Terrier, the Wire Fox Terrier, the Sealyham Terrier, and most recently, the Parson Russell Terrier and Russell Terrier. None of these Kennel Club breeds are commonly found working in the field today.

The absence of white-bodied working dogs in the Kennel Club does not mean that white-fox-working dogs have disappeared. The working Jack Russell Terrier is still as common as ever, presenting itself in a variety of coats (smooth, broken, and wire-coated or rough), sizes (25 to 38 cm or 10 to 15 inches tall, with most working dogs sized 25 to 33 cm or 10 to 13 inches tall), and coat colors (from pure white to 49% colored with tan and black markings). There is even a new type of working Jack Russell, the "Plummer Terrier", first created by Brian Plummer in the 1970s.

== Tools and technique ==
The tools used for terrier work have essentially remained unchanged for more than 400 years: a small-chested and game-working terrier, a good round point shovel, a digging bar, a brush hook to clear away hedges and brambles, fox nets, water for the dog and digger, a snare to remove the quarry, or a gun or blunt instrument to dispatch it.

The only "modern" piece of equipment found in a terrier man's kit that would look foreign to a terrier man from the late 18th century is an electronic radio collar used to help locate the dog underground and speed the dig. Locator collars have greatly increased the safety of dogs when underground.

== Controversy in the UK ==
Terrier work has come under criticism from animal welfare groups in the UK, particularly in connection with fox hunting, where terriers may be used to flush out a fox who has gone underground. This may lead to terriers attacking the foxes rather than flushing them out, thus prolonging the death of the fox. The League Against Cruel Sports states that distressing and prolonged deaths occur during the digging out or flushing out of foxes, and serious injuries can be sustained by dogs. The league notes that terriers and terrier men often accompany hunts which claim to be legally trail hunting, but are in fact hunting foxes.

Such organisations as the League Against Cruel Sports have produced a range of reports on the working terrier. In 1994, Alan Williams, the Labour MP for Swansea West, proposed a private members bill, the Protection of Dogs Bill, seeking to ban the activity, but it was not banned in the UK until the passage of the Hunting Act 2004. The Act outlaws terrier work unless it complies with a number of strict conditions designed for gamekeepers.

== See also ==
- Legislation on hunting with dogs
- Working animal

== General references ==
- Burns, Patrick. American Working Terriers, 2005. ISBN 1-4116-6082-X
- Chapman, Eddie. "The Working Jack Russell Terrier," 1994.
- Fischer, John. "Vulpicide in South Nottinghamshire in 1865"
- MacDonald, David. "Running With the Fox." 1987. ISBN 978-0-04-440084-4
- League Against Cruel Sports campaign against terrier work
- "Badger baiter banned after terriers hurt", Sheffield Today, 8 August 2005
