= Patterdale (disambiguation) =

Patterdale is a small village in English Lake District in the Eden District of Cumbria.

Patterdale may also refer to:

- Patterdale Terrier, a breed of dog
- Patterdale Hall, a building of the Bolton School
