= Fell Terrier =

Fell terrier
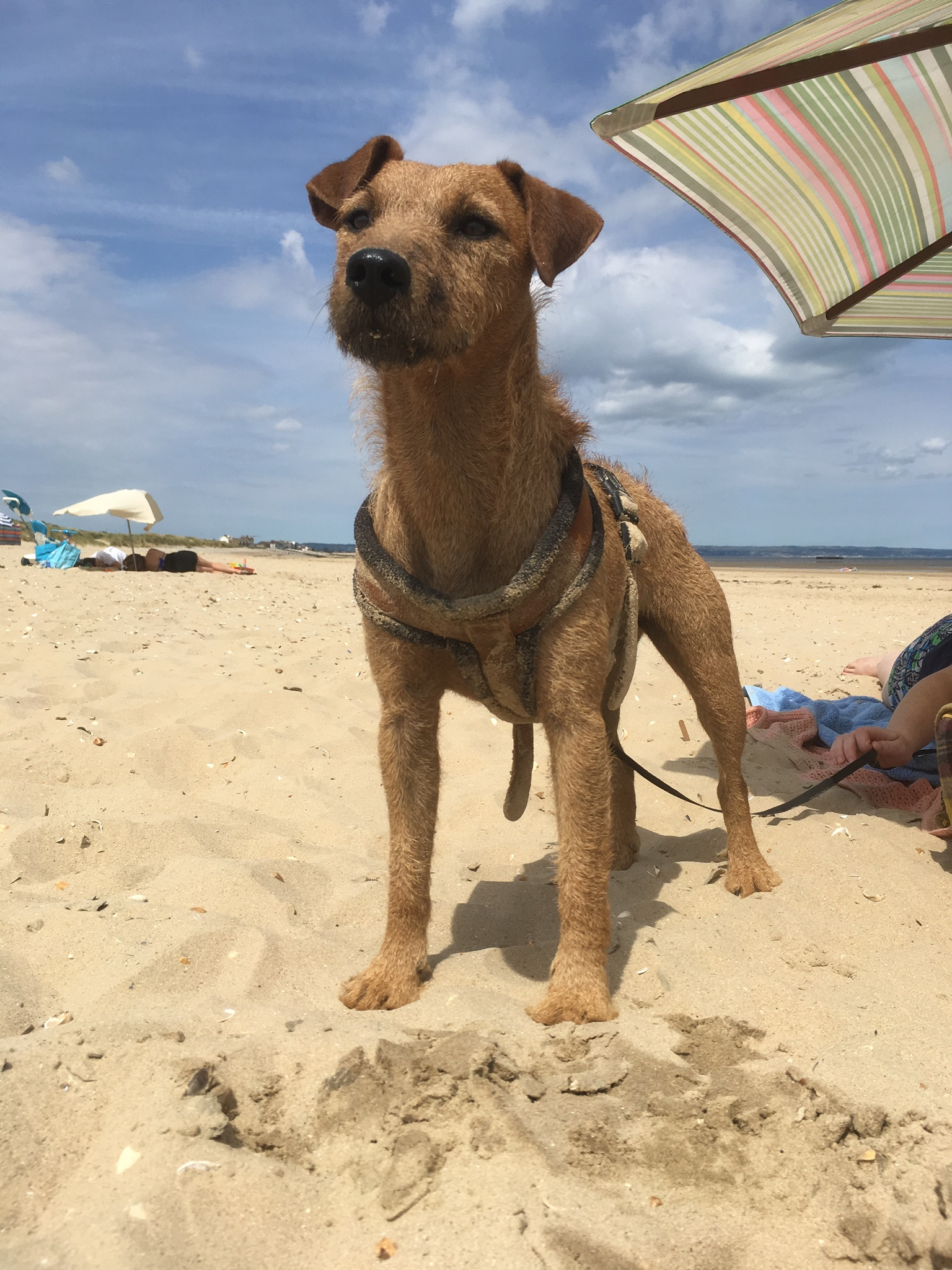
- Red fell terrier
- Other names: red fell terrier black fell terrier coloured terrier
- Origin: England
- Breed status: Not recognized as a breed by any major kennel club.
- Notes: Fell terrier is a type, not a breed.

Fell terrier refers to a regional type of long-legged working terrier, not a specific breed of dog.

== Description and purpose ==
Fell terriers are types of small working terriers developed in the fell country of Northern England and used as hunting dogs. They may be crossbred or purebred. Fell terrier types are typically small, usually 10- 15 lbs/6.5 kg, and with a narrow chest, so as to fit into the tunnels of the animals they hunt. Fell terriers are long-legged, with a rough textured coat, often red or black in colour. The tail traditionally is docked; in the United States the tail is not required to be docked. Crossbreeding with other hunting terriers in the beginning caused the appearance to vary.

Fell terriers are bred for hunting ability and gameness rather than to a standard of appearance (breed type). They hunt in packs or alone. The fell terrier was originally developed by Ullswater Hunt Master Joe Bowman, an early Border Terrier breeder, where he used the best red fell terriers available to him, so that he could continue his efforts to refine the fell terrier even further to hunt the large fell fox that was believed to cause serious losses for sheep stockmen. The dog needed long legs to follow hunters through heavy snow, and a narrow chest to follow the fox in a stony underground den. In the hunt, a terrier follows the red fox underground into its den, where it either kills the fox, bolts it or holds it until the hunter (terrierman) digs the dog and fox up. The original fell terrier bloodlines extend down from Harry Hardisty Turk and Sid Wilkinson's Rock, Wilkinson's Rock the most important stud dog of his Era bred down from Fred Barker and Anthony Barker's chowt-face rock terriers. Others who have contributed are Garry Middleton, Brian Nuttall, John Park, Ken Gould, Frank Buck, Cyril Breay, Joe Armstrong, Anthony Barker, Fred Barker, Maurice Bell, Anthony Chapman, John Cowen, Tommy Dobson, Eddie Pool, Graham Ward, and Sid Wilkinson. Fell terriers have been used in the United States for several generations hunting small game and have been known under the name Patterdale terrier. For the most part remain unchanged by the hunter who keeps the standard.

== Breeds ==
Several named breeds have been developed from the fell terrier type, such as the Border Terrier, Lakeland Terrier, Patterdale Terrier, Scottish Terrier, Welsh Terrier, and other locally developed breeds. All are sometimes called "fell terrier" interchangeably with their breed name. The "National Terriers Club LLC" and the "American Fell Terrier International" have published a Fell Terrier standard. In Germany, the Jagdterrier was developed out of Fell terrier stock in the 1920s. Fell Terriers may be descended from a very old type of long-legged terrier referred to as the rough-coated Black and Tan, similar to today's Welsh Terrier.

== See also ==
- List of dog breeds
