= Cesky Terrier =

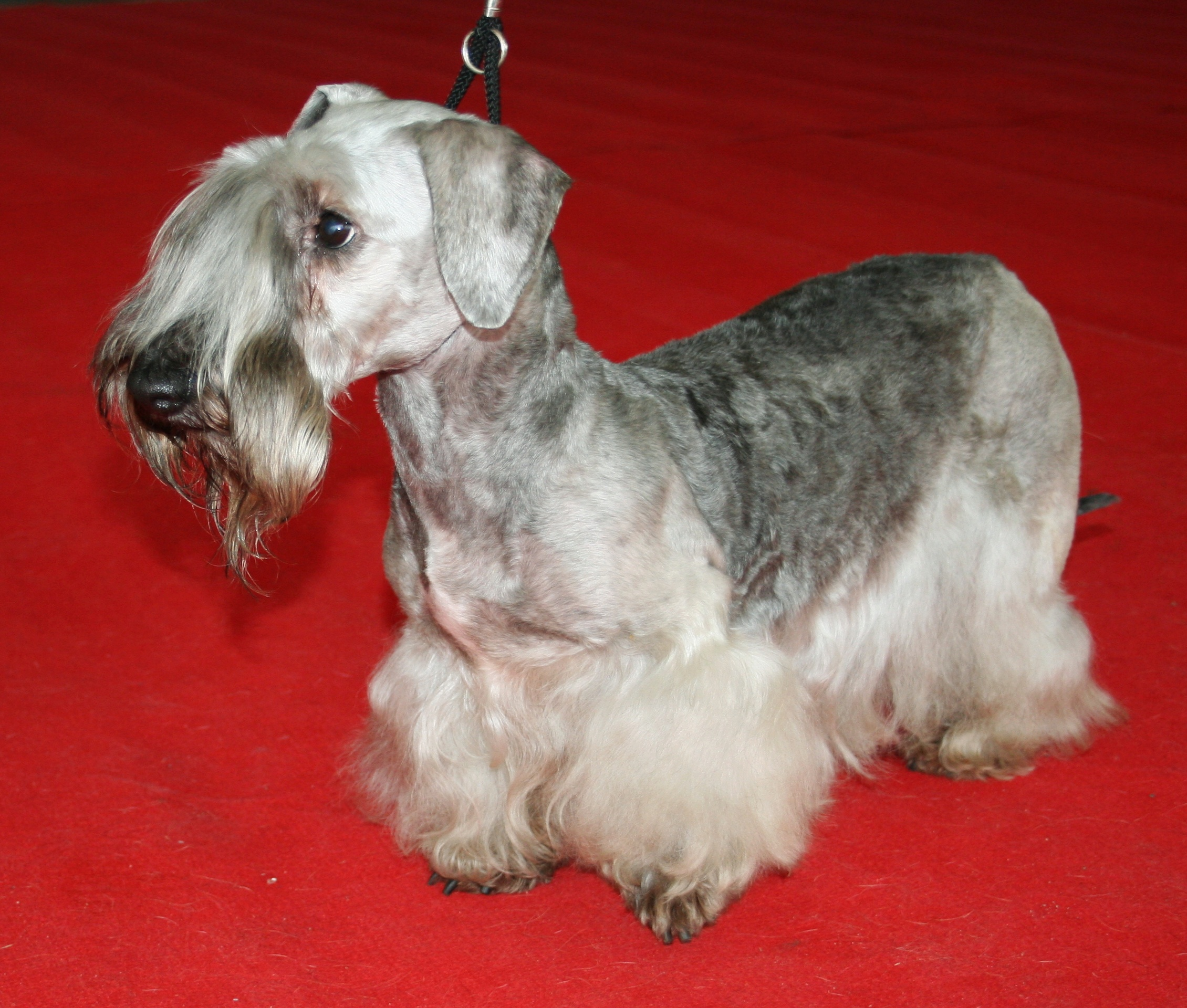
- A Cesky Terrier in show cut
- Origin: Czech Republic
Kennel club standards
- Czech Kennel Club: standard
- Fédération Cynologique Internationale: standard

The Cesky Terrier (/ˈtʃɛski/ CHES-kee; Czech: Český teriér, lit. 'Bohemian Terrier' or 'Czech Terrier') is a small terrier type dog originating in Czechoslovakia.

== History ==
The Cesky Terrier was created by a Czech breeder, František Horák, in 1948, as a cross between a Sealyham Terrier and a Scottish Terrier, to create a terrier suitable for hunting in the forests of Bohemia. Although not a trained scientist, Horák worked for many years as a research assistant at the Czechoslovak Academy of Sciences and used knowledge gained there in his dog breeding. Czechoslovakia was ruled by a communist regime at the time; when Horák's dogs became more popular around the world, he began to receive a large volume of mail from outside the country, which earned him the attention of the secret police. Horák died in 1997.

The Cesky Terrier was recognized for international competition by the Fédération Cynologique Internationale in 1963 as breed number 246 in Group 3, Terriers. The breed is now recognized by all of the major kennel clubs in the English-speaking world. The Cesky Terrier is one of the six most rare dog breeds worldwide.

The breed was first imported into the US in the 1980s by a group of enthusiasts. They formed the Cesky Terrier Club of America in January 1988. As interest grew, the breed became eligible to join the American Kennel Club (AKC) Foundation Stock Service Program from January 1, 2004, allowing it to compete in AKC Earthdog tests. At this stage the American Cesky Terrier Fanciers Association was formed and recognised by the AKC. It is the club accepted as the parent club by the AKC. However, the Cesky Terrier Club of America remains active in promoting the breed in the USA. From mid-2011, the Cesky Terrier was able to compete in the terrier group in America as it was accepted for entry in the AKC Stud Book.

The breed first arrived in the UK in 1989 and had to compete from the imported register. The Cesky Terrier was recognised by the Kennel Club (UK) in 1990 and on January 1, 2000, it gained rare breed status. It has since competed successfully in show competition in the UK.

== Description ==
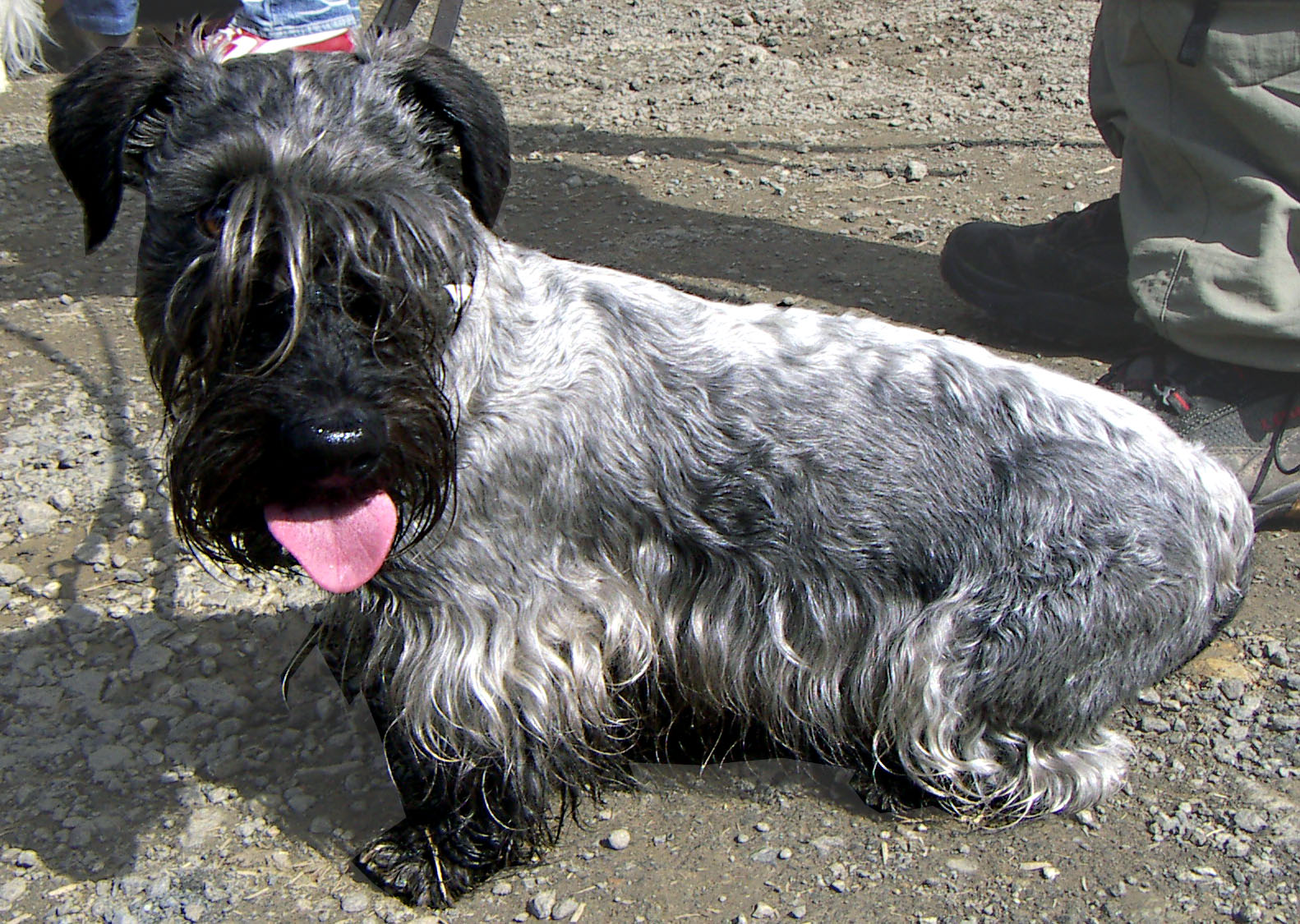

=== Appearance ===
The Cesky Terrier is a well-muscled, short legged, well-pigmented, hunting terrier of a rectangular format. The Cesky has natural drop ears, a natural tail, and sports a long, silky with slight texture coat in shades of gray from charcoal to platinum (black pigmented) or rarely brown (liver pigmented). The Cesky is longer than it is tall and has a topline that rises slightly to the rear.

== Breed standard ==
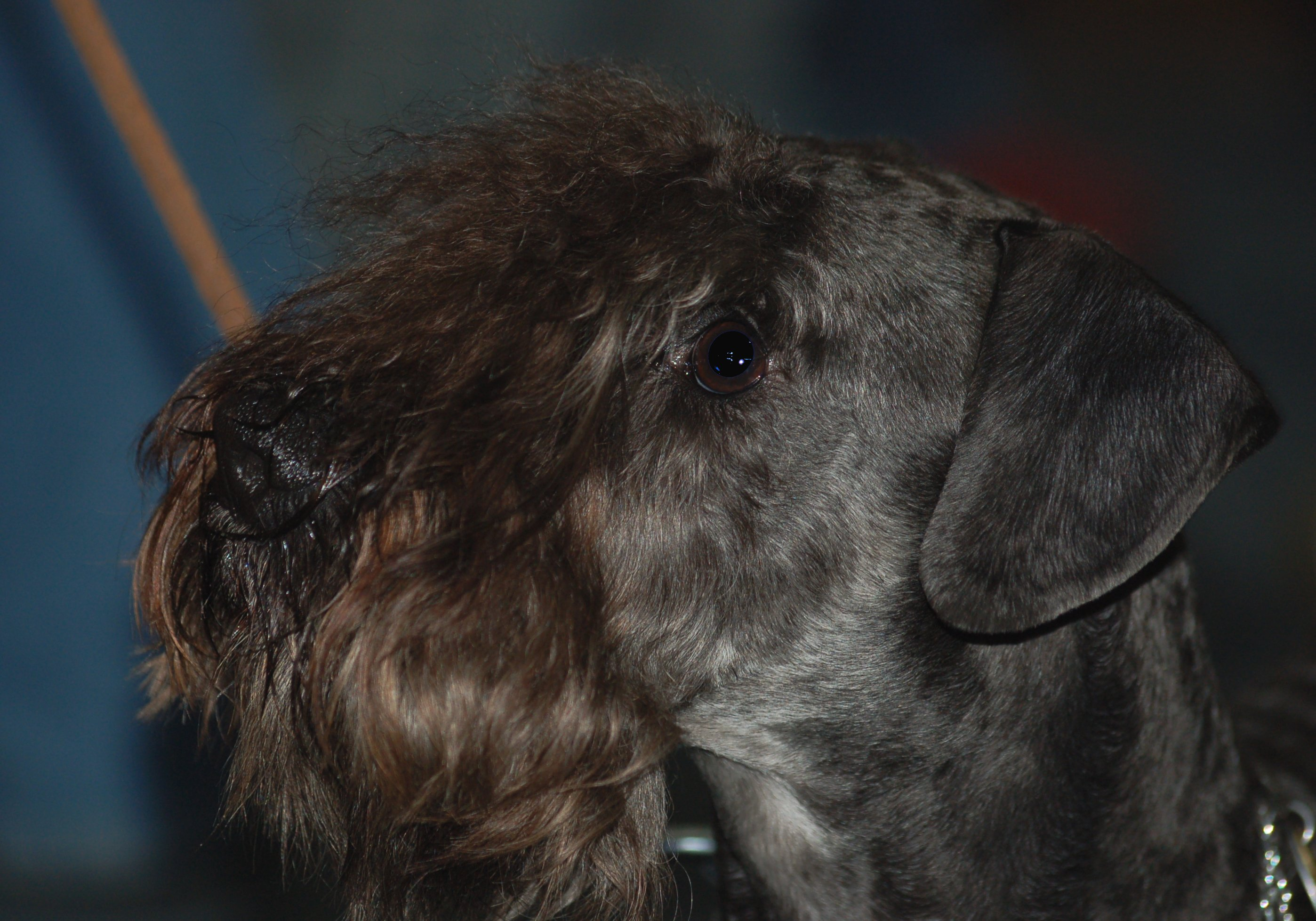
Cesky Terrier during dogs show in Katowice

The FCI Breed Standard gives the ideal measurements for the Cesky Terrier as:

- Height – Height at withers Ideally 11.5 inches (290 mm) for a male and 10.5 inches (270 mm) for a female; no less than 9.5 inches (240 mm) and no more than 12.5 inches (320 mm).
- Weight – Weight is ideally between 13 and 22 pounds (5.9 and 10.0 kg).
- No Cesky in good muscular condition and otherwise well balanced shall be penalized for being only Slightly outside the Ideal height or weight.
- Length – The length of body, measured from sternum to buttocks ideally between 16 and 17 inches (410 and 430 mm). To be in a ratio of approximately 1 1/2 (Length) to 1 (Height). The overall balance is more important than any single specification.
- Girth of thorax (behind elbows) – The girth of the body measured at the thorax, behind the elbows ideally is 17 to 18 inches (430 to 460 mm).

Head

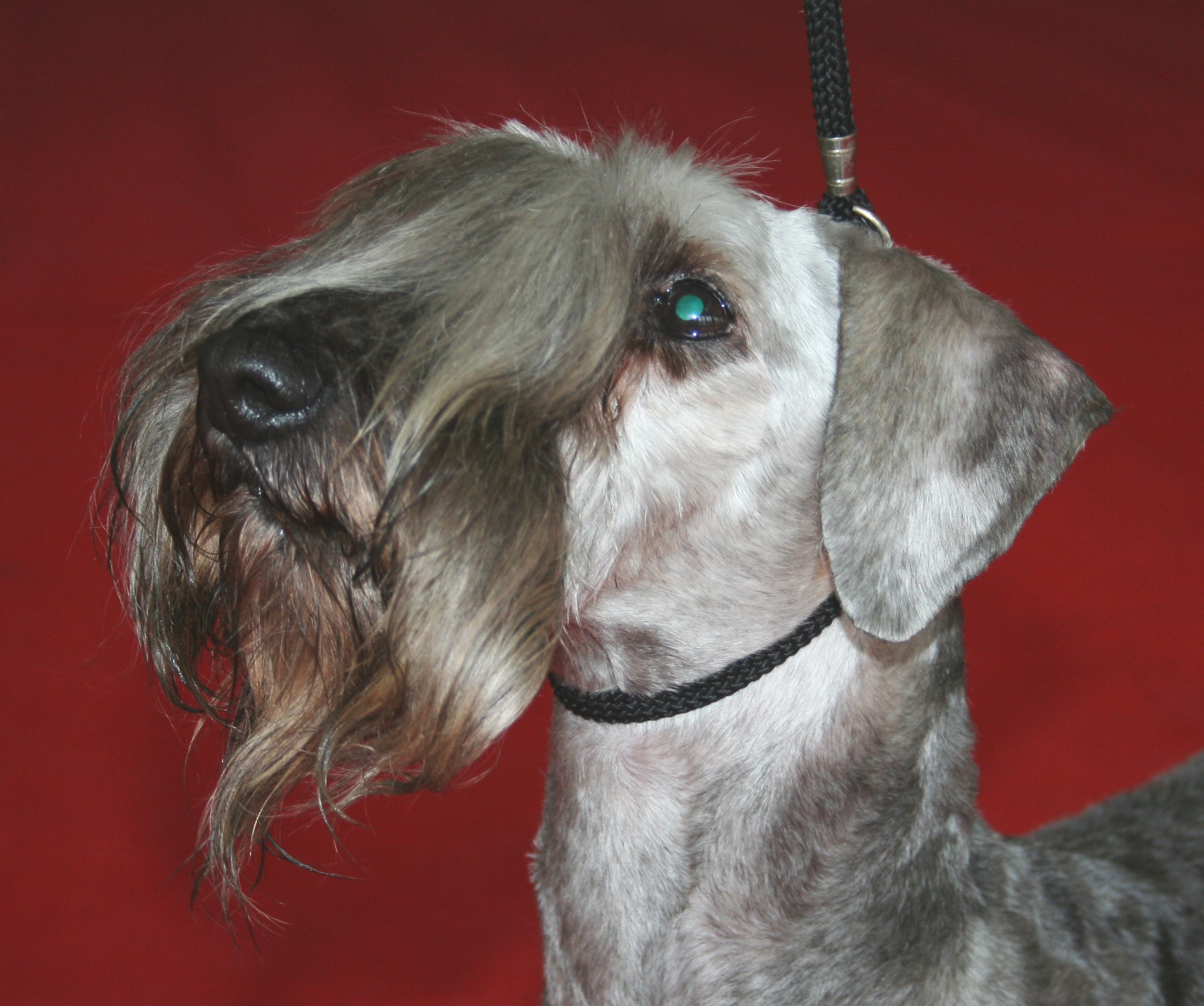
Cesky Terrier female head in show trim

- Expression—Calm and kind.
- Eyes - Slightly deep set with a friendly expression, of medium size. The color is brown or dark brown in all shades of grey dogs, liver in Brown dogs. Entropion or Ectropion is a disqualifying fault.
- Ears - Medium size, dropping in such a way to well cover the orifice. Ears are set rather high with forward edge lying close to the cheek. Shaped like a triangle, with the shorter side of the triangle at the fold of the ear.
- Head – Head is ideally 8 inches long, 3.5 to 4 inches wide and is shaped like a long, blunt wedge. The plane of the forehead forms a slight but definite stop with the bridge of the nose. The breadth between the ears is slightly larger for a dog than a bitch.
- Skull – Skull is shaped like a blunt wedge with the broadest part between the ears which apers moderately towards the supraorbital ridges. Occipital protuberance easy to palpate, cheek bones moderately prominent. Frontal furrow only slightly marked.
- Muzzle - Nasal Bridge straight. Narrow foreface undesirable.
- Stop – Not accentuated but apparent.
- Nose – Dark and well developed. The color is black in all shades of grey and liver in brown dogs.
- Lips—Relatively thick, fitting neatly.
- Bite—Scissors or level bite, complete dentition preferred. Absence of 2 premolars in lower jaw not to be penalized. Absence of more than 4 teeth or any incisors is a disqualifying fault.
- Teeth – Set square to the jaw, strong and regularly aligned.

Neck, Topline and Body

- Neck – Well muscled and strong. Medium-long, carried on a slant.
- Topline – Not straight but with a slight rise.
- Body – Fully muscled, oblong. Withers not very pronounced with the neck set rather high. Croup is strongly developed, muscular; pelvis moderately slanting. Hip bones often slightly higher than the withers.
- Chest – More cylindrical than deep.
- Ribs – Well sprung.
- Underline – Ample belly and slightly tucked up. Flanks well filled.
- Loins – Relatively long, muscular, broad and slightly rounded.
- Tail – Ideal length is 7 to 8 inches (180 to 200 mm) inches, relatively strong and low set. Tail may be carried downward or with a slight bend at tip; or carried saber shaped horizontally or higher. All of these tail carriages are considered correct with none having preference over the other. Curled tail or carried over the back to be penalized.

Forequarters

- Angulation—Moderately well angulated.
- Shoulder – Muscular, well laid back and powerful.
- Elbows – Somewhat loose, yet not turned in or out.
- Legs – Short, straight, well boned and parallel. Dewclaws may be present.
- Feet – Large, well-arched toes with strong nails and well-developed thick pads.

Hindquarters

- Angulation—Well angulated.
- Legs – Strong, parallel and well muscled.
- Upper Thigh - Well Muscled.
- Stifle—Well bent.
- Second Thigh—relatively short
- Hock Joint - Strong and well developed. Set relatively high.
- Feet – Smaller than forefeet, well arched toes, strong nails and thick well developed pads.

Coat

Long, fine, firm with slight texture, slightly wavy with a silky gloss. Not overdone with too much furnishings. Faults: Curly, Coarse or cotton-wool like texture. The Cesky Terrier is groomed by clipping and scissoring into a saddle pattern on the body, with the longer hair ending in a V on the tail. A "U" shape is cut out of the top lateral portion of the front legs and Areas of the neck, head, chest, shoulder, tail and rear thigh from the top of the V on the tail to the top of the hock and round the vent is clipped shorter to achieve this appearance and to highlight the well developed muscles of the Cesky Terrier. The Hair on the fore face from mid eye to the rear edge of the lip line is not to be clipped thus forming brows and a beard. The transition between clipped and unclipped areas should be pleasing to the eye and never abrupt.

Color

The Cesky Terrier has two varieties of color: In mature dogs, 3 years or older: 1. Any shade of gray from charcoal to platinum gray with Black pigment. 2. Coffee Brown with Liver pigment. Black may appear on the head, beard, cheeks, ears, feet and tail. White, grey, brown and yellow markings are permitted on the head, beard, cheeks, neck, chest, limbs and around the vent. A white collar or white tip is permitted on the tail. The base color must always be predominant. Faults: Long brindled coat on dogs older than 2 years, white covering more than 20%, and a white blaze are disqualifying faults.

Gait

The action should be free, driven and enduring. Gallop rather slow but lasting. The forelegs extend in a straight line forward.

=== Temperament ===
The breed standard calls for a calm dog, and aggression is a disqualifying fault. Cesky Terriers are reputed to be less active and quieter than other terriers. This may or may not make them suitable pets for families with children.

== Care ==
The coat of the Cesky Terrier is not stripped (dead hair pulled out with the fingers or a special knife) as in other terriers, but rather is clippered. .) The longer hair should be brushed daily.

== Health ==
This breed occasionally suffers from the Scotty Cramp, a minor problem causing awkward movement, but it is not life-threatening.

Breeding stock should be checked for hip dysplasia, patella luxation, cardiac abnormalities, PLL (primary lens luxation) and other eye disorders such as cataracts, thyroid issues, degenerative myelopathy, and Type 3 von Willebrand disease, all of which have been documented issues in the breed.

== See also ==
- List of dog breeds
- Terrier
- Terrier Group
- Working terrier
