= Lakeland Terrier =

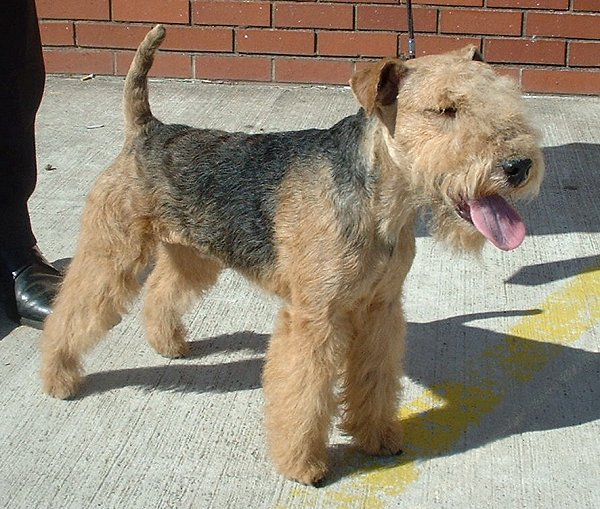
- Black and tan Lakeland Terrier
- Origin: United Kingdom (England)
Kennel club standards
- Fédération Cynologique Internationale: standard

The Lakeland Terrier is a dog breed, which takes its name from its place of origin, the Lake District in England. The dog is a small to mid-size member of the Terrier family. While independent in personality, it interacts well with owners and all family members. In the United Kingdom, the Lakeland Terrier is considered a vulnerable dog breed at risk of going extinct through low levels of breeding, according to The Kennel Club. In the United States, the Lakeland Terrier ranked 156 out of 202 breeds by number of American Kennel Club puppy registrations in 2024.

== Description ==
=== Appearance ===
At 15–17 lb (7–8 kg), the Lakeland Terrier is the smallest of the long legged, black and tan terriers. It is similar in appearance to the slightly larger Welsh Terrier but is finer-boned. The largest of the threesome in this similar group of Terriers is the Airedale. The Lakeland is a sturdy dog, compact, free moving and able to cover ground with little effort and much quickness. The dog is relatively narrow in the chest and has a broad muzzle, yet slightly narrower than the Welsh Terrier, with small, V-shaped ears. The Lakeland breed has a thick bushy wiry outer coat and a soft undercoat. It comes in a variety of colors. The Kennel Club lists the following as acceptable colors: black and tan, blue and tan, red, wheaten, red grizzle, liver, blue or black. Lakeland Terriers have an upright tail, which was previously customarily docked in the United Kingdom and continues to be customarily docked in the United States. Most Lakeland Terriers grow to between 13.5 and 15 inches (34 and 38 cm) in height, measured to the withers.

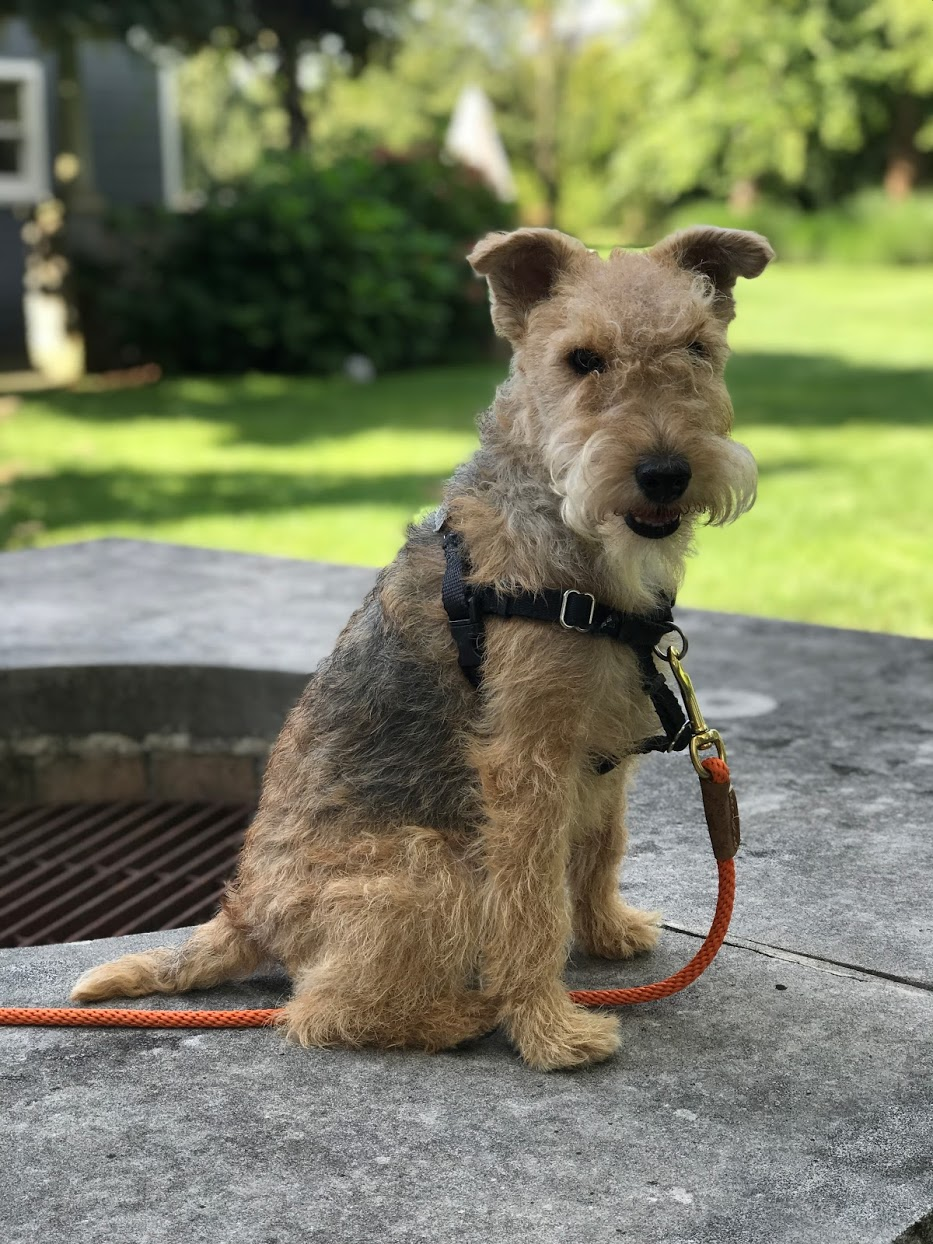
Grizzle and tan Lakeland Terrier

The eyes are small and dark colored and of oval shape. The nose and pads of the feet are black except in liver colored dogs where the nose and pad coloring will be liver colored. Liver colored dogs will have a slightly lighter colored eye. The dog will not shed if properly groomed. It is suggested that "[r]egular stripping and trimming improves the texture and quality of the coat" and is "necessary to enhance the dog's utilitarian purposes" as well as "enhancing him for the show ring".

=== Temperament ===
The dogs are friendly, bold, and confident. It is rarely shy and not usually aggressive. Very intelligent and independent minded, they are quick to learn and easy to train, though terriers often exhibit "selective deafness" when their interest level is aroused. The Lakeland is receptive to crate training. As with most terriers, the Lakeland is energetic, and daily exercise is a must.

== History ==
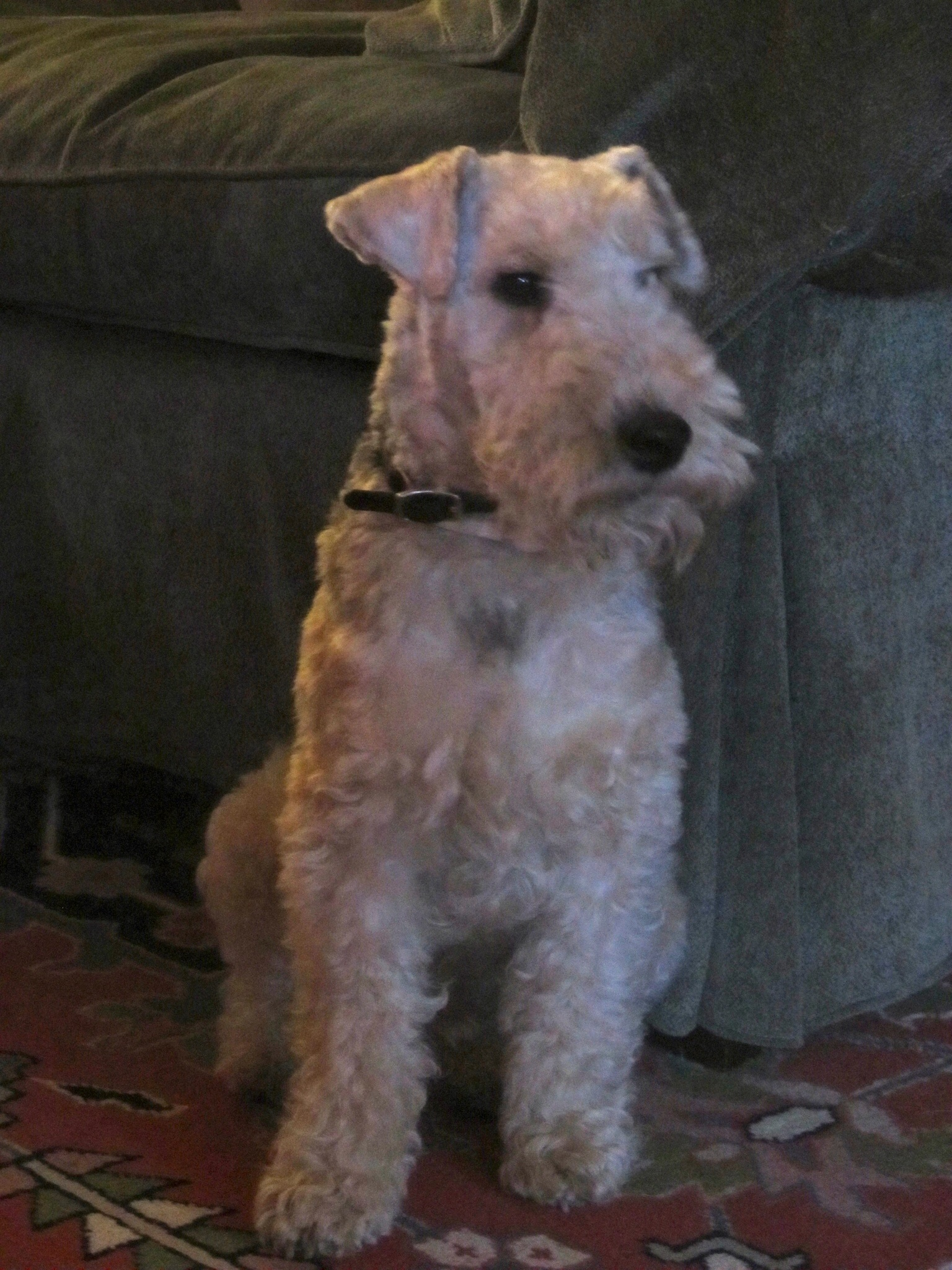
Hughie, a Lakeland of the Junior Earthdog Class

As one of the earliest Terriers (Latin derivation of earth), dating from the 1700s, this "earth" dog is a descendant of the old English Black and Tan and Fell Terriers. The Lakeland's original service was "going to ground" on the farm in hunt for vermin. Its size and energy make it popular as a hunter in hard to reach places; the breed is among those eligible for competition in sanctioned Earthdog trials.

The working dog version of the Lakeland is often known as the Fell Terrier or Patterdale Terrier. Whereas most terrier breeds have only to bolt their quarry, or to mark it by baying, the Lakeland must be able to kill the foxes in their lair.

In the Lake District of England, the mountainous, rocky terrain is unsuitable for fox hunting on horseback, and foxes were hunted on foot. It has been suggested that the Lakeland Terrier's great stamina derives from running all day with the hounds, unlike his close cousin, the fox terrier, who would have been carried in a saddle bag to be released only when the fox had gone to earth.

The UK Kennel Club claims to have recognised Lakeland Terriers in 1921, whereas the Lakeland Terrier Club suggests this was closer to 1928. The Lakeland Terrier Association (now defunct) was founded in 1921. In 1925 the breed attained homogeneity following a cross-breeding with the Fox Terrier and the Airedale Terrier. The Lakeland Terrier Club was founded in 1932 and promoted the breed nationally through Kennel Club-sanctioned shows. The American Kennel Club recognised the breed in 1934. Lakeland Terriers have twice won Best in Show at Crufts and at Westminster Kennel Club Dog Show.

== Health ==
A 2024 UK study found a life expectancy of 14.2 years for the breed compared to an average of 12.7 for purebreeds and 12 for crossbreeds.

== Famous/Popular Lakelands ==
- Stingray of Derryabah - the first dog to win Best in Show/Supreme Champion at both the top US and UK shows Westminster (1968) and Crufts (1967)
- Champion Revelry's Awesome Blossom - top winning Lakeland Terrier owned by Jean L. Heath and Bill Cosby
- Kevin - owned by Neil Tennant (singer of the Pet Shop Boys)

== See also ==
- List of dog breeds
