= Plummer Terrier =

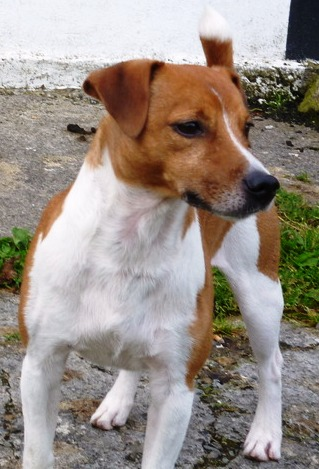
- Plummer Terrier
- Origin: United Kingdom
- Breed status: Not recognized as a breed by any major kennel club.
- Notes: PTCGB breed standard

The Plummer Terrier is a working terrier. It was originally bred by Brian Plummer to primarily be a ratter and hunt vermin. The breed, while unrecognized by any kennel club, is known for its rugged determination and hardiness.

== Origins and history ==
In the late 1960s and throughout the 1970s, Brian Plummer worked as a somewhat reluctant teacher of several schools throughout southern Yorkshire and the Midlands. He was already well known in his local neighborhood for going around with a pack of terriers to catch rats, when he decided to create his own terrier breed in the 1970s. Well-versed in breeding, he strove to produce a unique strain of terrier by mixing the Jack Russell Terrier with the Beagle, Fell Terrier, and Bull Terrier.

These terriers were worked hard and as the breed developed, so too did Plummer's reputation as a breeder of hardy terriers that bred true to type. Initially known as the Huddlesford Rat Pack, the breed is now named after him.

The Beagle introduced to Plummer's lines in the 1960s was out of Catherine Sutton's Rossut show-bred strain that originated from U.S. imports, brought to the U.K. to tidy up British exhibits. It was owned by Philip Ainsley, a fellow teacher friend of Plummer's.

Further outcrosses were introduced along the way. The addition of Fell Terrier blood, Jaeger from Nigel Hinchcliffe's lines and Flint from Brian Nuttall's lines, both noted working lines and most likely descending from Cyril Breay and Frank Buck's stock, infused refinement of shape and to a certain extent contributed to fixing type, like that seen in Pagan, a black and tan terrier, acknowledged as one of the early pillars of the breed.

Further additions included a Jack Russell terrier known as Errol Forsyth's Pip, Alan Thomas's Hamish, and Laddie from the Chiddingfold and Leconfield foxhound kennels. Performance as an earth dog was and is an essential prerequisite of most, if not all terrier breeds and Plummers are no exception to this rule. These three dogs were known to be full-on earth workers.

In the early 1980s, during one of the many TV documentaries (Rat hunting man and Lone furrow) about Plummer and his terriers, he said that one day he would like his terriers to be known as Plummer Terriers and recognised by the Kennel Club.

In 1985, he suffered a near-fatal heart attack which resulted in the dispersal of his substantial pack of terriers to friends. He eventually moved to a remote croft in Caithness, Scotland, and began to write full-time. By the early 1990s most of the pack's important gene pool was found and regrouped, albeit on a smaller scale. Work continued and other lines were sought; widening the gene pool enough to be able to limit inbreeding.

At this point, two distinct types began to develop, the smaller, more snipe-nosed type and the more bully, stronger-headed type. Plummer opted for the latter, and by the late 1990s decided that the breed needed a wider gene pool in order to reach its maximum potential. Bull Terrier blood of known ancestry was sought and outcrossed into the breed.

Plummer had cancer and died in September 2002. His work was carried on by others and the breed standard remains intact.

As a working terrier, the Plummer is a dog, which has many uses. They are retrievers, most generally take to water freely; intelligent, have excellent noses, are biddable and have many uses in the field. They are often found ferreting; some are found in the beating line on local shoots; occasionally they are used to ground but undoubtedly they are most commonly used in a pack hunting rats.

== Appearance ==
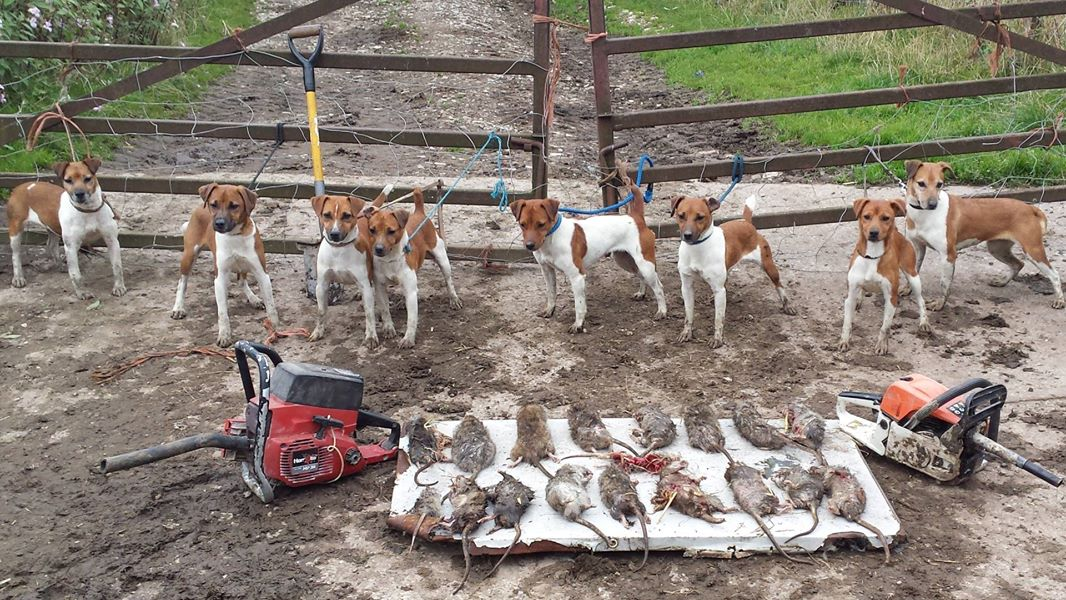
Plummers ratting

The Plummer Terrier has a fiery red coat with two distinct patterns collared (a white band around the neck) and caped (only showing white on the throat). They should be heavily coloured and preferably be no more than 14” at the shoulder. Terriers that do not possess collared or caped markings are labelled shattered, they are perfectly fine as workers, companions but are not classed as good examples of the breed. The same can be said for tricolours, dogs which carry black in their colouring. The ears fold over like most terriers, and the nose and eye are typically black, and the jaw has a good scissors bite.

=== Breed standard ===
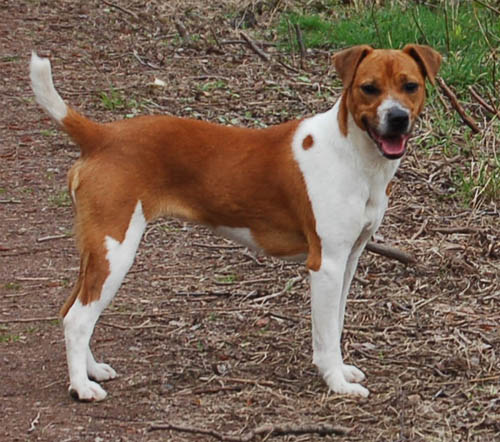
Plummer Terrier

Plummer defined a breed standard in 2000.

== Future ==
Generally a game working dog, the Plummer Terrier is not a Kennel Club breed, and most owners today who work their dogs would prefer that this dog was not part of the Kennel Club yet for a myriad of reasons. While the Plummer Terrier generally breeds true in appearance, the standard is a working terrier standard.

== See also ==
- Ratter (dog)
- List of dog breeds
