= Prey drive =

Instinctive inclination of a carnivore to find, pursue and capture prey

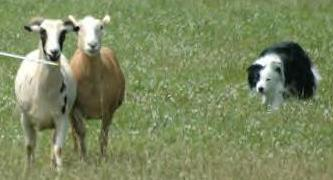
A Border Collie herding.

Prey drive is the instinctive inclination of a carnivore to find, pursue, and capture prey; this instinct can be refined for industrial purposes such as herding livestock.

== Aspects ==
The predatory motor activity follows a sequence: search (orient, nose/ear/eye); stalk; chase; bite (grab-bite, kill-bite); dissect; and consume.

In different breeds of dogs, certain steps of these have been amplified or reduced by human-controlled selective breeding for various purposes. The "search" aspect of the prey drive is used in detection dogs such as bloodhounds and beagles. The "eye-stalk" is for herding dogs. The "chase" is seen in sighthounds such as Greyhounds and lurchers, while the "grab-bite" and "kill-bite" are for the training of terriers. In most dogs, prey drive can occur without extrinsic reinforcement.

== Benefits ==
In dog training, prey drive can be used as a performative advantage because dogs with strong prey drive are more willing to pursue moving objects such as toys, which can then be used to encourage certain kinds of behavior, such as that of greyhound racing or the speed required in dog agility. Prey drive can affect training in Schutzhunds as well.

Retrievers are sometimes expected to chase prey and bring it back to the human hunter, but not bite or damage it. Bull Terriers, such as the Staffordshire Bull Terrier, have an amplified grab-bite as they were originally bred to bait bulls (restrain bulls by hanging onto their noses), but never needed to find or stalk the prey.

== See also ==
- Working terrier
