= Brian Plummer =

British writer, teacher, and dog breeder (1936–2003)

D Brian Plummer
- Born: 11 September 1936; Bridgend, Wales
- Died: 12 September 2003 (aged 67); Caithness, Scotland
- Occupations: Dog breeder, ferret farmer, writer, teacher

Brian Plummer, also known as David Brian Plummer (11 September 1936 – 12 September 2003), was a British writer, teacher and dog breeder.

== Background ==
In 1977, Plummer appeared on Richard Whiteley's Calendar regional news programme, during which a ferret became 'latched' onto Whiteley's fingers. A blasé Plummer showed little concern for the pain Whiteley was in, instead telling him that if the ferret had been serious the bite would have been "through to the bone. He's playing with you."

Growing up in the austere years around World War II, Plummer based some of his biographical stories in and around the valley in which he grew up. Some of the stories involve friends, members of the village community, and bizarre members of his own family.

After a stint of National Service, Plummer trained to be a teacher and worked in various areas of the United Kingdom, including Rotherham and Walsall. In his books he hints at various 'episodes' in his life including a couple of abortive spells of self-sufficiency, a period of travel abroad as a gamekeeper in Germany and Eastern Europe, some time as a professional boxer in America, and various periods of deep depression.

== Documentaries ==
The UK television documentary maker Barry Cockcroft made several documentaries about Plummer, including A Way Out of Walsall (1985), which is about Plummer's training pupils of the local Forest Comprehensive School for the world of professional boxing, and Lone Furrow (1987), which looks at the preoccupation of Plummer with his dogs, which have been rat-catchers, and his current wish to cross the Highlands pulled by a pack of German Shepherd dogs. Another producer, Michael Croucher, made a 1981 documentary entitled Hunting Man about Plummer, formerly a full-time hunter and later a teacher and writer, who at that time still hunted in the fast-disappearing countryside around Birmingham.

== Dog breeding ==
The Plummer Terrier, a breed of dog that he developed, is named after him.

== Death ==
After suffering a heart attack in 1985, Plummer moved to Caithness with a plan to breed German Shepherd dogs, then finally settled in Abington, in Lanarkshire. He died on 12 September 2003.

== Books ==
- The Jack Russell Terrier (1976).
- Rogues & Running Dogs (1976).
- Modern Ferreting (1978).
- Tales of a Rat Hunting Man (1978).
- The Working Terrier (1978).
- The Complete Lurcher (1979).
- Adventures of an Artisan Hunter (1979).
- Nathan – A Pit Fighting Dog (1980).
- The Complete Jack Russel Terrier (1980).
- Lepus (1981).
- Diary of a Hunter (1981).
- The Hunters Yearbook (1981).
- The Hunters Yearbook (1982)
- Merle – The Start of a Dynasty (1982).
- The Fell Terrier (1983).
- Omega (1984).
- Practical Lurcher Breeding (1985).
- Hunters All (1986).
- North & North Again (1987).
- Off the Beaten Track (1987).
- Trog (1988).
- The Cottage at the Edge of the World (1990).
- In Pursuit of Coney (1991).
- The Complete Book of Sight-Hounds (1991).
- Secrets of Dog Training (1992)
- The Sporting Terrier (1992).
- Ferrets (1993).
- Lurcher & Longdog Training (1993).
- Plummers Yearbook (Various 1994/95).
- The Development of the Dog (1995).
- The New Complete Lurcher (1998)
- Polly: A White German Shepherd (1999)
- Practical Dog Breeding (2000).
- The Modern Lurcher under the pseudonym Michael Shaw
- The Modern Working Terrier under the pseudonym Michael Shaw
