= Border Terrier =

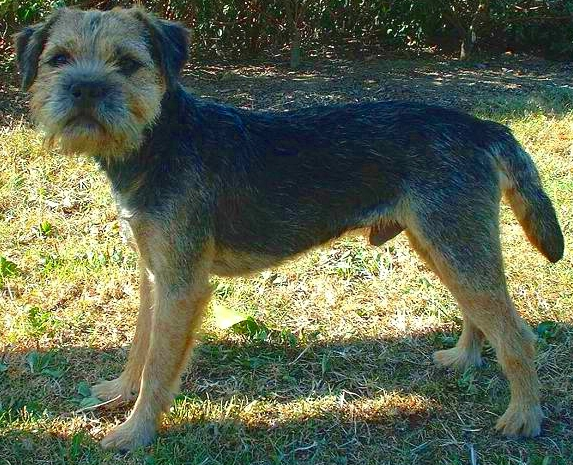
- Male Border Terrier
- Origin: United Kingdom
Traits
Weight	Males	6–7 kg (13–15.5 lb)
	Females	5–6.5 kg (11.5–14 lb)
- Coat: Harsh and dense; with close undercoat.
- Colour: Red, wheaten, grizzle and tan, or blue and tan.
Kennel club standards
- The Kennel Club: standard
- Fédération Cynologique Internationale: standard

The Border Terrier is a British breed of small, rough-coated terrier. It originates from the area of the Anglo-Scottish border, and shares ancestry with the Dandie Dinmont Terrier and the Bedlington Terrier from the same area. The dogs were traditionally used in fox-hunting, and worked with the Border Hunt in Northumberland.

The breed was officially recognised by The Kennel Club in Great Britain in 1920, and by the American Kennel Club in 1930.

== History ==
Originally the Border Terrier was referred to as the Coquetdale Terrier or Redesdale Terrier from the area in which it evolved, but by the late 1800s it was generally known as the Border Terrier, probably because of its long history with the Border Hunt in Northumberland.

It shares its ancestry with that of the Bedlington Terrier and the Dandie Dinmont Terrier. It was recognised as a breed by the Kennel Club in 1920, the same year The Border Terrier Club was formed. Their original purpose was to bolt foxes which had gone to ground. They were also used to kill rodents, but they have been used to hunt otters and badgers too.

The first Kennel Club Border Terrier ever registered was The Moss Trooper, a dog sired by Jacob Robson's Chip in 1912 and registered in the Kennel Club's Any Other Variety listing in 1913. The Border Terrier was rejected for formal Kennel Club recognition in 1914, but won its slot in 1920, with the first standard being written by Jacob Robson and John Dodd. Jasper Dodd was made first President of the club.

In 2006, the Border Terrier ranked 81st in number of registrations by the AKC, while it ranked tenth in the United Kingdom.

In 2008, the Border Terrier ranked eighth in number of registrations by the UK Kennel Club.

== Characteristics ==
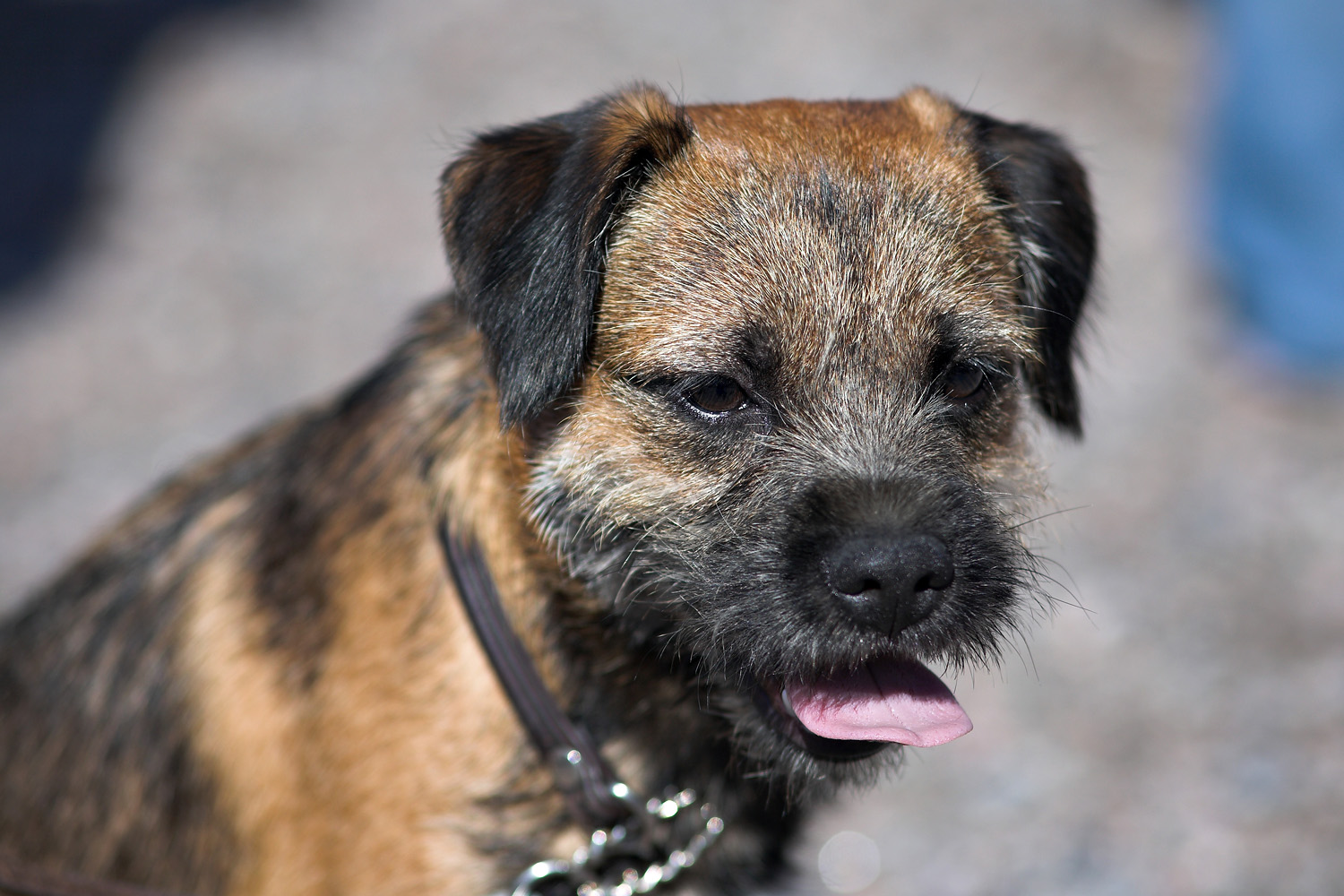
A Border Terrier portrait

The Border Terrier was bred to have long enough legs to keep up with the horses and other foxhounds, which travelled with them, and small enough bodies to crawl in the burrows of foxes and chase them out so the hunters had a blank shot. The foxhounds that travelled with them were not small enough to do the Border Terrier's job.

Border Terriers have a broad skull and moderately short muzzle, and strong teeth. The V-shaped ears are on the sides of the head and fall towards the cheeks. Common coat colours are grizzle-and-tan, blue-and-tan, red, or wheaten. Whiskers are few and short. The tail is moderately short, thick at the base and tapering.

Narrow-bodied and well-proportioned, males stand 13 to 16 in (33 to 41 cm) at the shoulder, and weigh 13 to 15.5 lb (5.9 to 7.0 kg); females 11 to 14 in (28 to 36 cm) and 11.5 to 14 pounds (5.2 to 6.4 kg).

The Border Terrier has a double coat consisting of a short, dense, soft undercoat and harsh, wiry weather- and dirt-resistant, close-lying outer coat with no curl or wave.

== Health ==
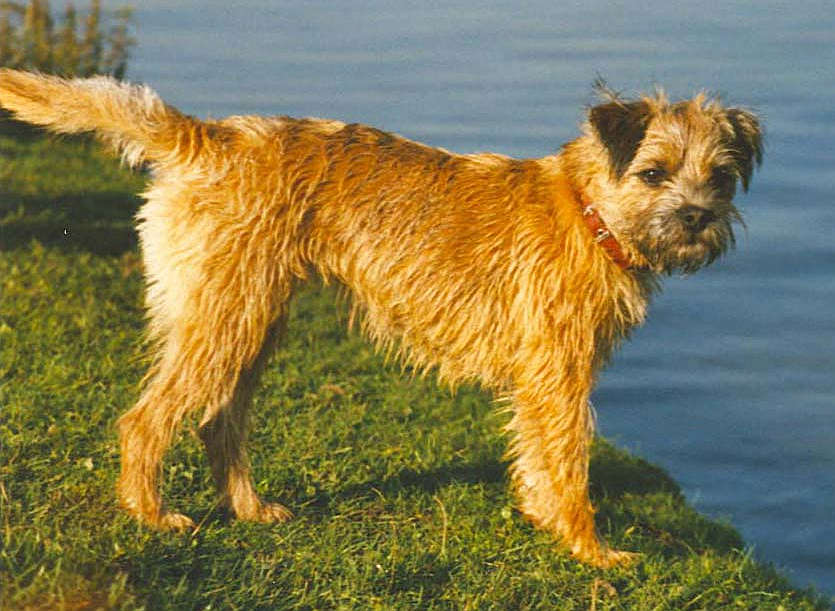
Female red Border Terrier.

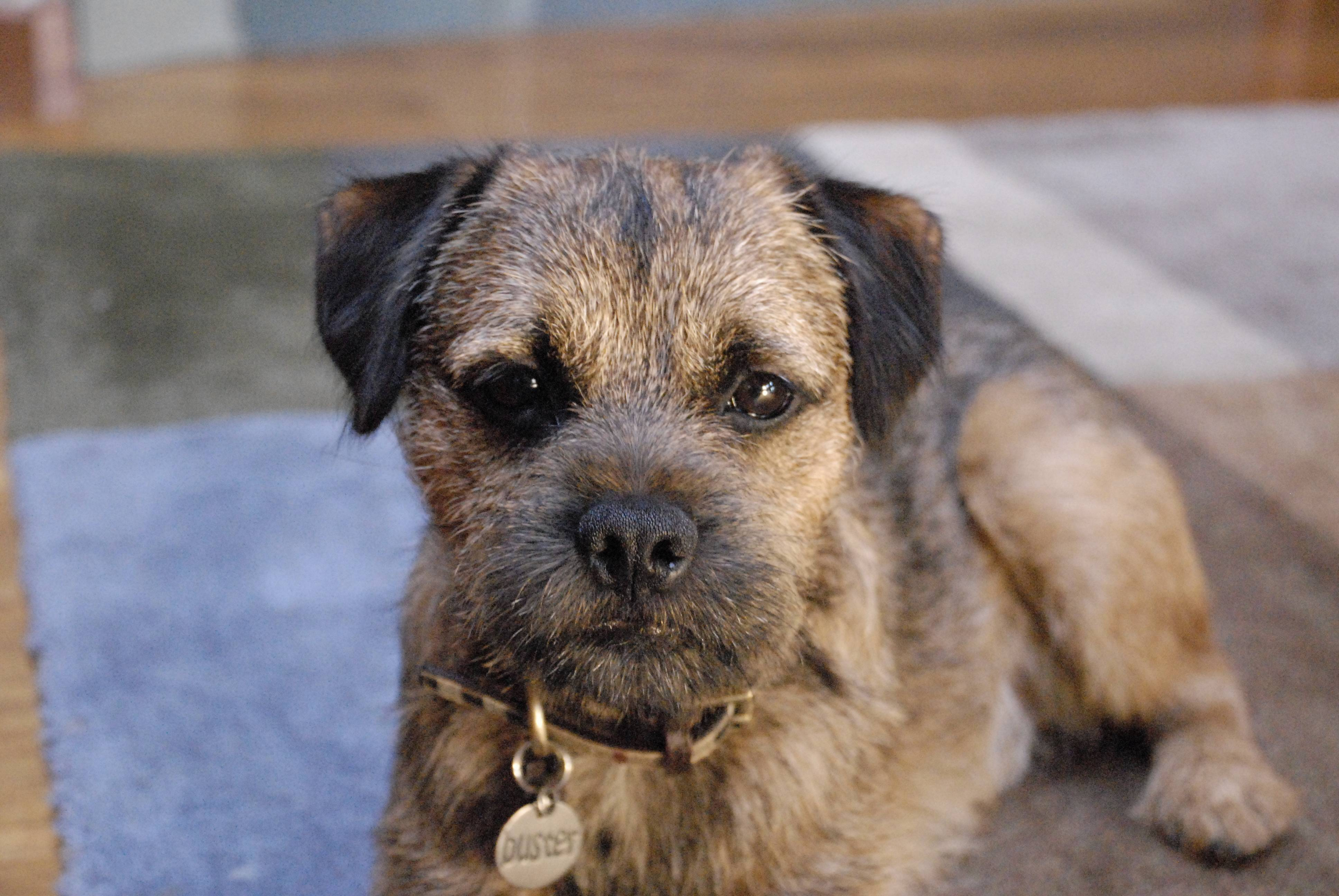
Red Grizzled Border Terrier

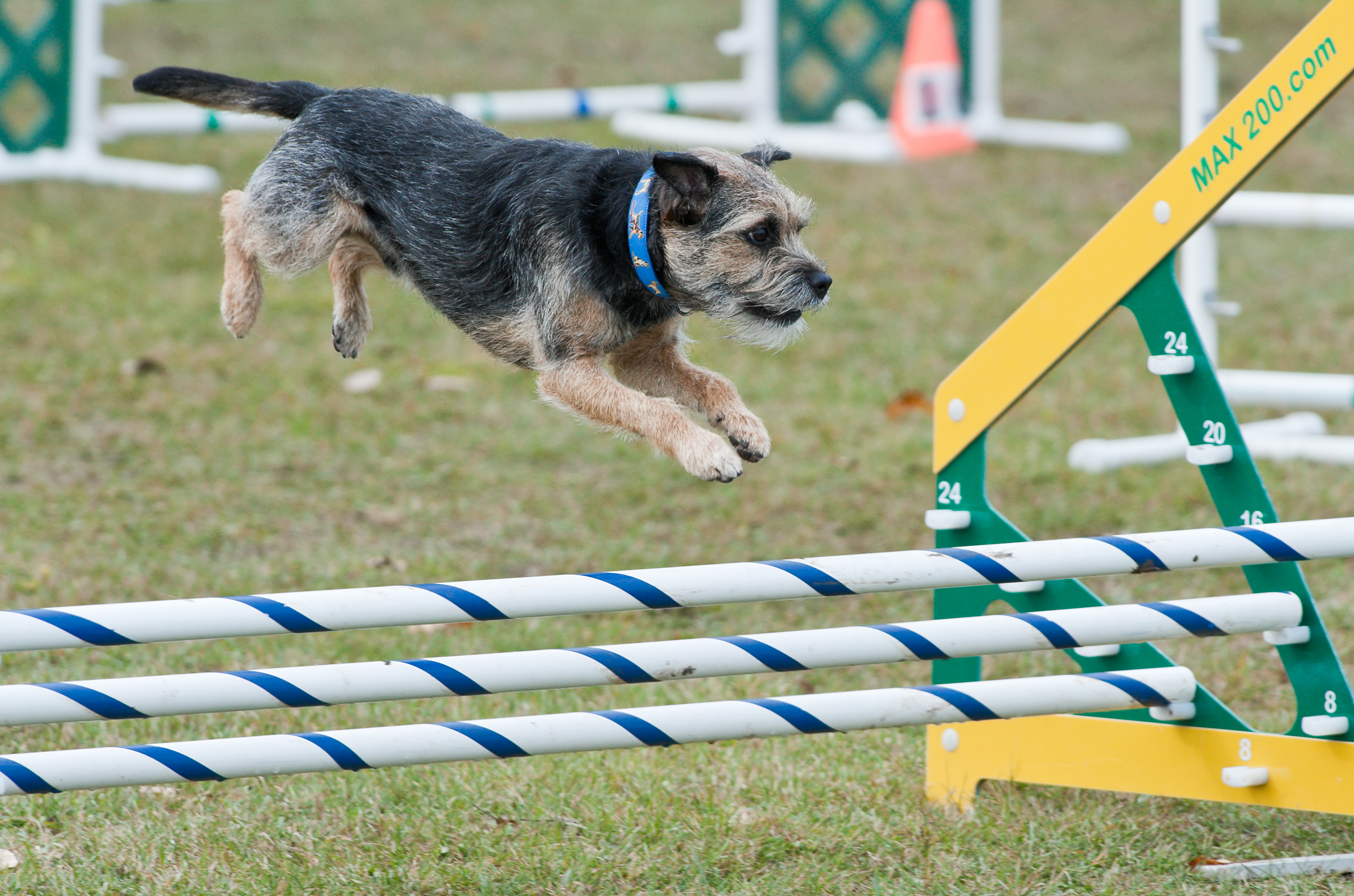
Border Terrier performing jump in Dog Agility

Canine epileptoid cramping syndrome is a condition that is recognised to occur in the Border Terrier.

A 2024 UK study found a life expectancy of 14.2 years for the breed compared to an average of 12.7 for purebreeds and 12 for crossbreeds.

A UK study found a predisposition to gall bladder disease in the Border Terrier. The breed was found to be 86.48 times more likely to acquire gall bladder mucocele and 28.7 times more likely to acquire other forms of gall bladder disease compared to other dogs. The study also found a predisposition to neutrophilic cholangitis, with the breed being 12.07 times more likely to acquire it.

== See also ==
- List of dog breeds
