= Patterdale Terrier =

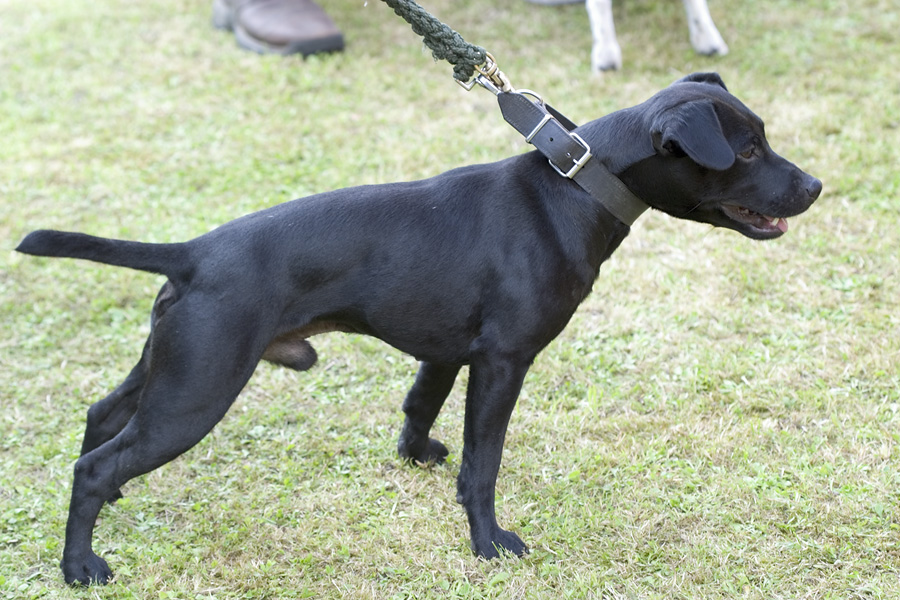
- Patterdale Terrier
- Origin: England

The Patterdale Terrier is a breed of dog descended from the Northern terrier breeds of the early 18th century, originally bred in Patterdale in the Lake District.

== Description ==
=== Appearance ===
There are three breed standards for the Patterdale Terrier belonging to the Patterdale Terrier Club of America (PTCA) (which is the first club and registry in the history of the breed), United Kennel Club (UKC) and the American Dog Breeders Association (ADBA), both in the United States, since the United Kingdom Kennel Club does not recognize the Patterdale Terrier.

The Patterdale Terrier Club of America standard states that when evaluating Patterdale Terriers, judges must always keep in mind that this breed is, first and foremost, a working terrier, specifically bred for hunting. More precisely, the Patterdale is a hunting terrier designed to confront quarry directly in tight and challenging quarters. Therefore, any signs of work, such as scars or marks, should not be penalized in any Patterdale Terrier Club of America event. When all other factors are equal, the award should favor the terrier with proven working ability.

The Patterdale Terrier Club of America standard further specifies:

The Patterdale Terrier is a tough, active terrier and should give a compact, well balanced image. Height should be between 10" to 15" measured at the shoulders. Weight should be proportionate, presenting neither a "weedy" or "clunky" image.

==== Coat and colour ====
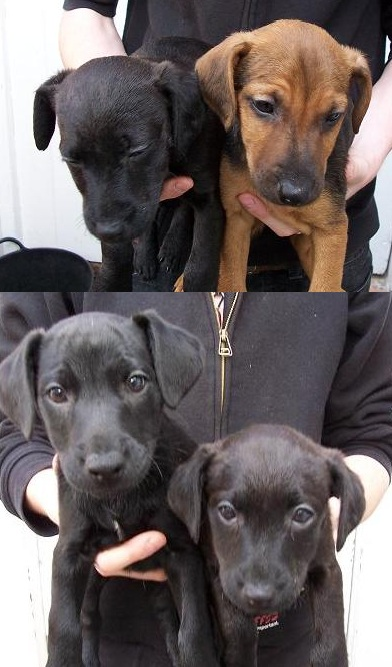
The main variations in coat colour/type

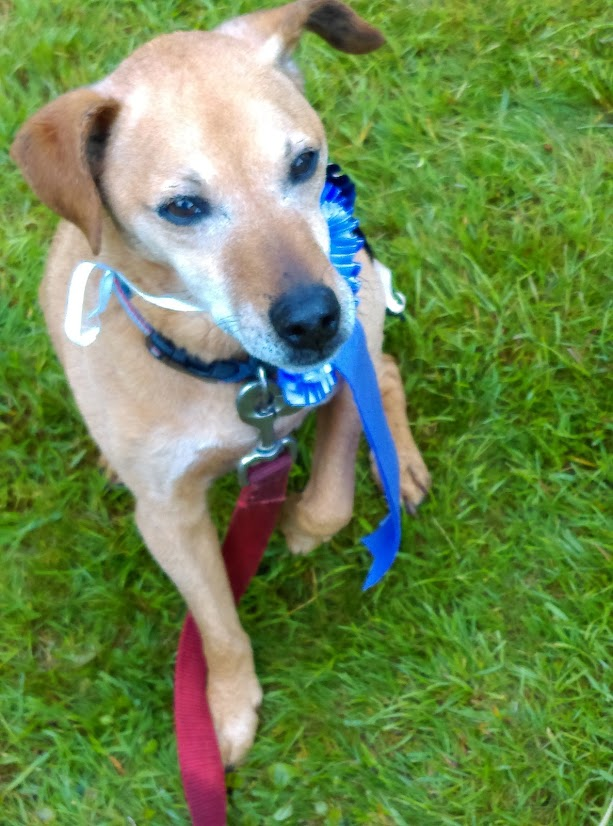
An example of a female Patterdale Terrier at the Rhu Dog show depicting a much lighter variation in coat colour.

The coat may be one of three types:

- Smooth: Coarse, overall very short, smooth
- Broken: Coarse, longer hair on body except for head and ears which is smooth, may be some longer whiskering on muzzle and chin
- Rough: Coarse, longer hair overall, including face and ears

Colors include Black, Red, Chocolate, or Black and Tan. There may be some variations in the primary colors. For instance, blacks may have some lighter hairs, red may range from tan to deep rust and some black around muzzle is not uncommon, chocolates may be a very dark chestnut, or lighter brown/chocolate (a true chocolate will have a brown/red nose) and black and tans may have more or less of these colors on each individual dog, but the only registerable colors are those listed above. Chocolate-colored dogs will have a brown nose (officially called a "red" nose). Some white on chest and feet is acceptable.

=== Temperament ===
The United Kennel Club Standard states: Patterdale Terrier puppies tend to be bold and confident beyond their capabilities. The Patterdale is known as a working terrier, rather than a show dog. Typical of terriers, whose work requires high energy and a strong drive to pursue prey, Patterdales are very energetic and can be difficult to socialize. Though also kept as pets, due to being bred for high-intensity work, they may tend towards being too energetic for a sedentary household life.

== History and overview ==
The origins of the breed can be traced back to the cross breeding of The Old English Terrier (the original black terrier) and the Northumberland Pit Terrier (now extinct) and later to the Lake District, specifically to Ullswater Hunt master Joe Bowman, an early Border Terrier breeder. where he used the best Red Fell terriers and the best local hunting terriers available to him, so that he could continue his efforts to refine the breed even further.

The breed did not gain notability until Cyril Breay, a schoolmaster and huntsman, refined them even further, using the best dogs of northern England. It is believed that all current Patterdale Terriers descend from dogs bred by Breay.

The Patterdale Terrier is more of a "type" rather than a "breed", being the result of a culmination of working terrier breeds indigenous to the United Kingdom. Patterdale Terrier Type dogs were bred by poachers across northern England. As well as others, for the hunting and dispatch of the red fox in the rocky fells around the Lake District, North West and North East of England where a traditional digging dog was not always of great use. Patterdale Terriers have also been used for illegal badger baiting in the UK.

The Patterdale was developed in the harsh environment in the north of England, an area unsuitable for arable farming and mostly too hilly for cattle. Sheep farming is the predominant farming activity on these hills. Since the fox is perceived by farmers as being predatory with respect to sheep and small farm animals, terriers are used for predator control. Unlike the dirt dens found in the hunt country of the south, the rocky dens found in the north do not allow much digging. As a consequence, the terrier needs to be able to bolt the fox from the rock crevice or dispatch it where it is found.

The use of "hard" dogs to hunt foxes in this way was made illegal in England and Wales by the Hunting Act 2004, as it runs counter to the code of practice under the Act.

In the US, the Patterdale Terrier Club of America was founded by Robert Burns in 1993 to be the first registry for the breed and continues to be the largest database of the breed in the world. The Patterdale Terrier was recognized by the United Kennel Club on 1 January 1995, but remains unrecognized by the American Kennel Club.

== See also ==
- List of dog breeds
