= Max (American dog) =

1983–2013 beagle, dachshund and terrier mix dog

- Species: Canis familiaris
- Breed: Beagle, dachshund, terrier mix
- Sex: Male
- Born: August 9, 1983; Louisiana, U.S.
- Died: May 18, 2013 (aged 29); New Iberia, Louisiana, U.S.
- Known for: Claim of being the world's longest-lived dog
- Owner: Janelle DeRouen

Max (August 9, 1983 – May 18, 2013) was a beagle, dachshund, and terrier mix from Louisiana whose owner claimed had lived to 29 years and 282 days. His owner, Janelle Derouen, claimed she adopted him from a Louisiana sugar cane farmer in 1983.

== Life ==
According to Max's owner, he was adopted from a sugar cane farmer in 1983. His diet mostly consisted of dry dog food with some beef dog bones. It was reported in August 2009, that he only suffered from mild arthritis and cataracts.

Max died of a tonic-clonic seizure on May 18, 2013, at a claimed age of 29 years and 282 days. According to veterinarians, his seizure was a result of his old age.

== Verification ==
In 2009, The Telegraph reported that Max's owner had a veterinary birth certificate from 1983 that would have proved he was the oldest living dog at 26. These records were provided to Guinness World Records in hopes that Max would be recognized as the oldest living dog.

At Max's claimed age of 29 on May 15, 2013, the claim by DeRouen was purported to have been approved to be recognized as the world's oldest dog. However, just three days later, on May 18, Max died.

As of 2024, the dog considered by Guinness World Records as the oldest to have ever lived is Bluey, an Australian Cattle Dog reported to have lived 29 years and 5 months. Max's age was claimed to have been older than Bluey's, but the claim has not been recognized. Another dog that was claimed to have lived longer is Bobi, a Rafeiro do Alentejo from Portugal that was claimed to have lived 31 years and 165 days. Guinness World Records revoked its certification of Bobi's longevity in 2024 after concluding there was insufficient evidence to support the claim.

== See also ==
- List of longest living dogs
- List of individual dogs
