= Ortigosa =

Ortigosa may refer to:

== People ==
- Javier Ortigosa (born 1982), Spanish handball player
- Oscar Ortigosa (born 1966), Peruvian swimmer

== Places ==
- Ortigosa, Portugal
- Ortigosa de Cameros, La Rioja, Spain
- Ortigosa de Pestaño, Segovia, Spain
- Ortigosa del Monte, Segovia, Spain

== See also ==
- Ortigoza
