= List of longest-living dogs =

This is a list of the oldest dogs in the world, listed by age, all of whom have attained the minimum age of 20. Aging in dogs depends on many factors, including breed, size and diet.

Validated by Guinness World Records

Longest-living dogs verified by age
Rank	Name	Birth date	Death date	Age	Breed	Home country
	Chilla	5 March 1951	8 March 1983	32 years, 3 days		Australia
	Bobi	11 May 1992	21 October 2023	31 years, 163 days	Rafeiro do Alentejo	Portugal
	Lazare	4 December 1995	14 May 2026	30 years, 161 days	Continental Toy Spaniel	France
	Maggie	1986	17 April 2016	30 years	Australian Kelpie	Australia
	Briciola	1982	22 July 2012	30 years	Chihuahua/Zwergpinscher mix	Italy
	Max	9 August 1983	18 May 2013	29 years, 282 days	Beagle/Dachshund/Terrier mix	United States
1	Bluey	7 June 1910	14 November 1939	29 years, 160 days	Australian Cattle Dog	Australia
	Bella	1979	September 2008	29 years	Labrador mix	United Kingdom
2	Butch	1975	2003	28 years	Labrador mix	United States
3	Taffy	1 September 1975	31 March 2003	27 years, 211 days	Welsh Sheepdog	United Kingdom
4	Adjutant	14 August 1936	20 November 1963	27 years, 98 days	Labrador Retriever	United Kingdom
	Uncle Chichi	1985	17 January 2012	27 years	Poodle	United States
5	Spike	10 November 1999	Living	27 years, 0 days	Chihuahua mix	United States
	Lilly	January 2000	Living	26 years and 9 or 10 months	Mongrel	Italy
6	Pusuke	April 1985	December 2011	26 years, 8 months	Shiba Inu mix	Japan
	Buksi	1990	26 August 2017	26–27 years	Mongrel	Hungary
	Henry	15 January 2001	Living	25 years, 299 days	Rat Terrier	United States
	Bramble	1978	31 March 2003	25 years	Border Collie	United Kingdom
	Briciola	March 1989	9 November 2013	24 years, 9 months	Mongrel	Italy
	Cicci	14 January 1999	13 January 2023	23 years, 364 days	Volpino/Poodle mix	Italy
7	TobyKeith	9 January 2001	30 April 2024	23 years, 112 days	Chihuahua	United States
8	Piccolo	October 1987	December 2010	23 years, 2 months	Mongrel	Italy
9	Gino Wolf	24 September 2000	29 September 2023	23 years, 5 days	Chihuahua/American Eskimo Dog Mix	United States
	Birillo	1998 (Summer)	31 July 2021	22–23 years	Mongrel	Italy
10	Pebbles	28 March 2000	3 October 2022	22 years, 189 days	Toy Fox Terrier	United States
11	Funny	27 May 1999	21 November 2020	21 years, 178 days	Dachshund	Japan
12	Chanel	6 May 1988	28 August 2009	21 years, 83 days	Dachshund	United States
13	Jake	21 July 1994	27 July 2015	21 years, 6 days	Rat Terrier	United States
	August	24 April 2000	31 March 2021	20 years, 341 days	Golden Retriever	United States
14	Otto	February 1989	January 2010	20 years, 11 months	Dachshund/Terrier mix	United Kingdom

== See also ==
- List of individual dogs
- List of longest-living cats
- List of longest-living organisms
