= Conqueiros =

- Village
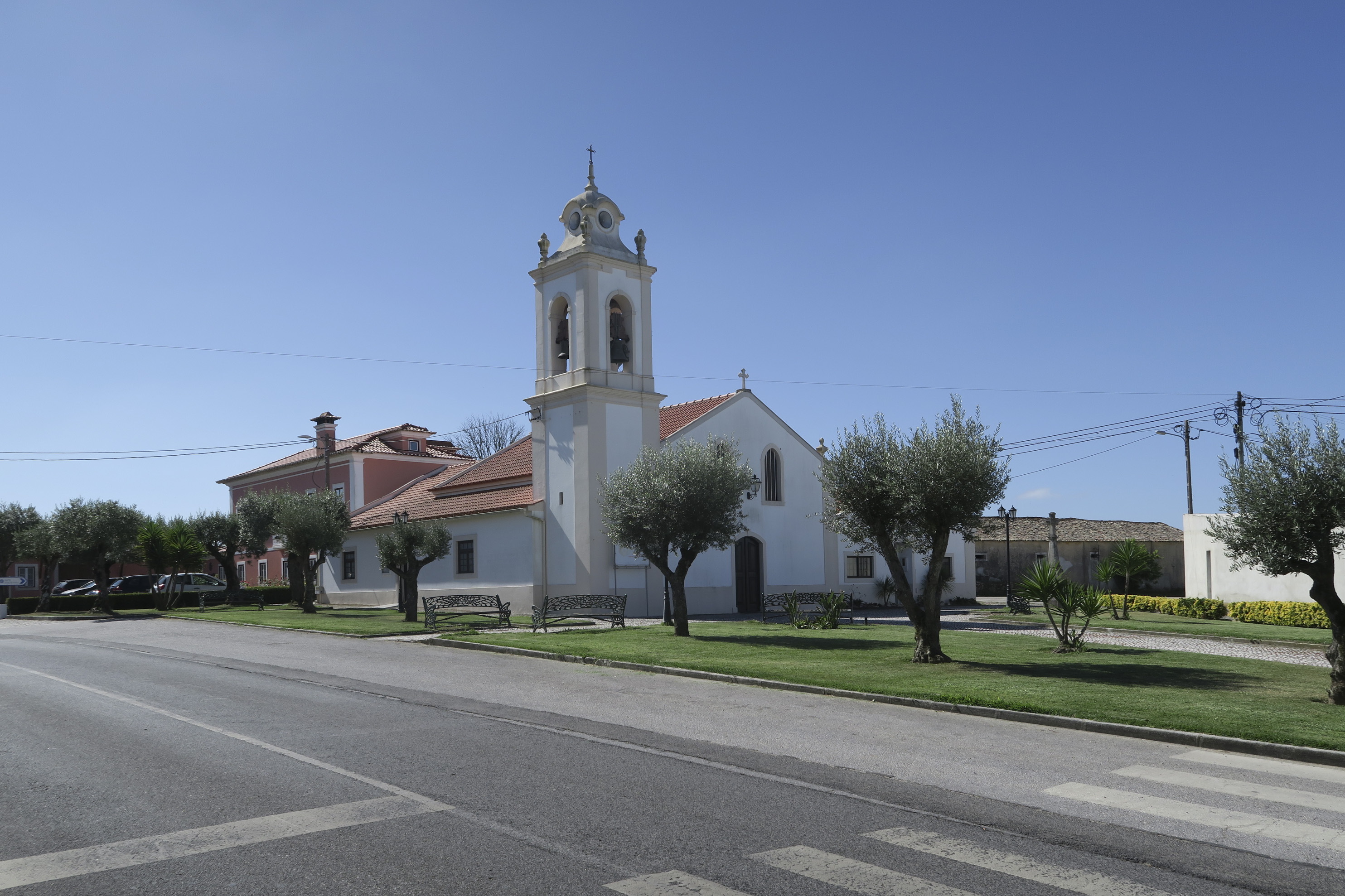
- Conqueiros Church
- Interactive map of Conqueiros
- Coordinates: 39.835550°N 8.816847°W
- Country: Portugal
- Region: Centro
- District: Leiria
- Municipality: Leiria
- Civil parish: Souto da Carpalhosa e Ortigosa

Area
  - Total: 2.08 km^{2} (0.80 sq mi)
- Elevation: 125 m (410 ft)

Population (2011)
  - Total: 314
  - Density: 151.1/km^{2} (391/sq mi)
- Time zone: UTC+0 (WET)
- Postal code: 2425

Conqueiros (Portuguese pronunciation: [kõˈkɐj.ɾuʃ]) is a village in the civil parish of Souto da Carpalhosa e Ortigosa, in the municipality of Leiria, in Central Portugal. Its patron is Saint Ildephonsus. Bobi, a dog claimed to be the world's oldest dog lived in the village.

== Geography ==
Conqueiros is located approximately 10 km north of the city of Leiria, and 2 km east of the village of Ortigosa, on a plateau at an elevation of around 125 metres — one of the highest points in the surrounding region. In this area there are large pine forests, vineyards, orchards, olive groves and eucalyptus plantations. The soil is fertile and irrigated in the low areas, allowing productive agriculture linked to corn, beans, fodder and vegetable products.

== Notable residents ==
- Bobi (1992?-2023), a dog who was claimed to have been the oldest dog to have ever lived.

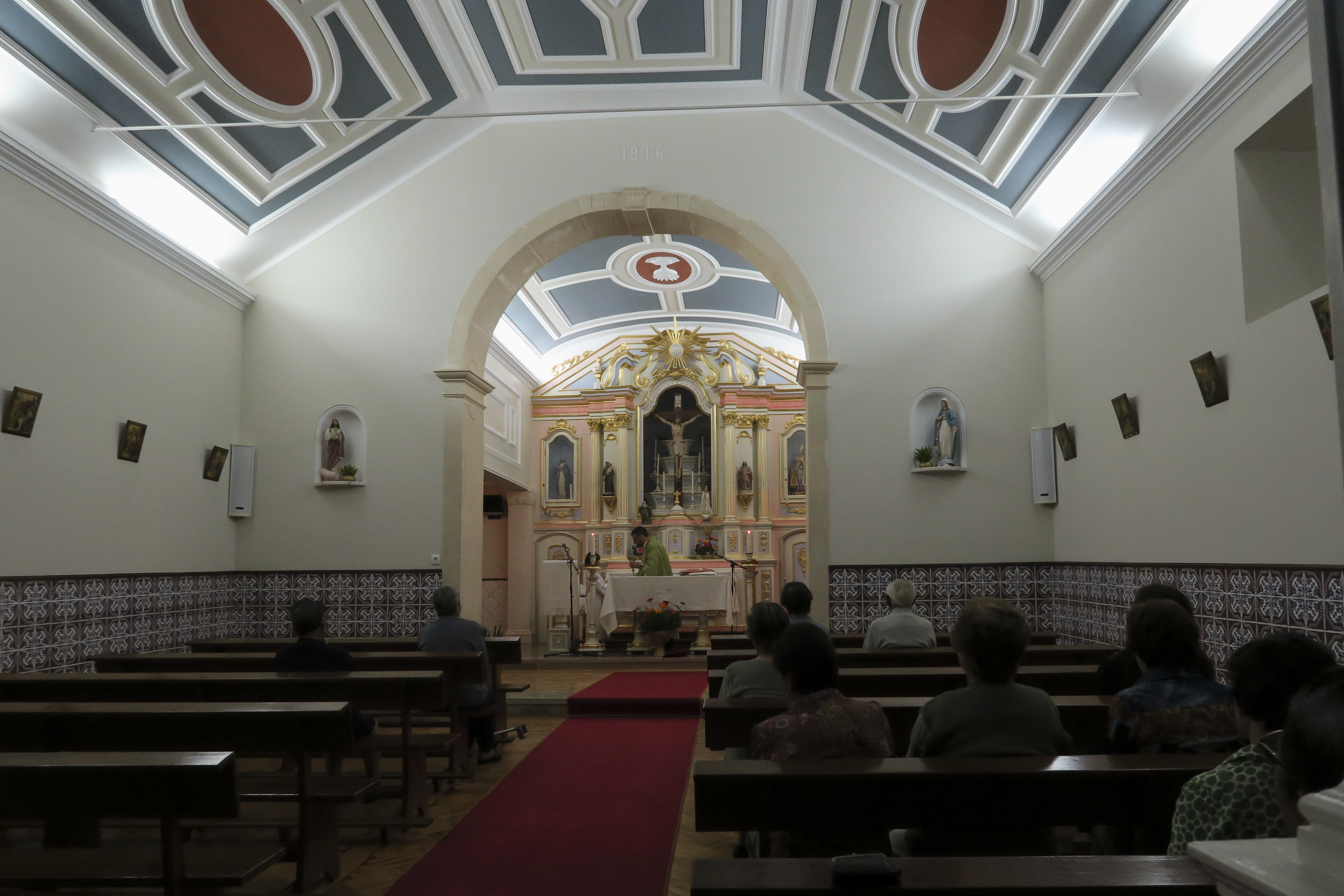
Conqueiros church, Conqueiros, Leiria
