= Laryngeal paralysis =

Medical condition

Laryngeal paralysis in animals is a condition in which the nerves and muscles that control the movements of one or both arytenoid cartilages of the larynx cease to function, and instead of opening during aspiration and closing during swallowing, the arytenoids remain stationary in a somewhat neutral position. Specifically, the muscle that causes abduction of the arytenoid cartilage, the cricoarytenoideus dorsalis muscle, ceases to function. This leads to inadequate ventilation during exercise and during thermoregulatory panting as well as incomplete protection of the airway during swallowing.

One of the most common forms of laryngeal paralysis develops in geriatric medium to large breed dogs, in particular the Labrador Retriever, but also some other breeds. This had been traditionally known as idiopathic laryngeal paralysis ("ILP": idiopathic means "of unknown cause"), and was believed to be a result of a condition affecting the nerves of the larynx (bilateral mononeuropathy of the recurrent laryngeal nerves). However investigations into ILP by two groups in Michigan and Tennessee between 2005 - 2013 showed that the condition was not limited to, or specifically a result of, dysfunction of the laryngeal nerves. Instead it was the most visible symptom of a slowly progressing polyneuropathy of old age, which also affected other nerves in the body. This finding, now generally believed correct following further research, has led to the proposed renaming of this type of laryngeal paralysis from "Idiopathic laryngeal paralysis" ("ILP") to "Geriatric onset laryngeal paralysis polyneuropathy" ("GOLPP").

Animals affected by laryngeal paralysis have reduced tolerance for exercise and heat and an increased risk of aspiration pneumonia. The condition is not generally regarded as causing pain, other than physical distress and anxiety caused by any difficulty in breathing or emotional distress from any difficulty with physical movement. Where laryngeal paralysis is related to a general progressive polyneuropathy, as in GOLPP, the nervous system will gradually degenerate causing increasing difficulty in management of the limbs (especially rear limbs), swallowing and breathing, and eventually in most cases euthanasia. Laryngeal paralysis is fairly common in large breed and geriatric dogs, particularly in the Labrador Retriever, is rarely found in cats, and can also occur in horses where it is referred to as roaring, roarer's syndrome, or medically as laryngeal hemiplegia or recurrent laryngeal neuropathy (RLN). Laryngeal paralysis can be unilateral or bilateral depending upon dysfunction of one or both arytenoid cartilages.

== Causes ==
In most cases, the cause of laryngeal paralysis is unknown or idiopathic. However, the disorder may arise secondary to general neuropathies, generalized neuromuscular diseases, muscular diseases, neoplasia either in the cervical (neck) region or the cranial mediastinum, or trauma. This acquired form occurs predominantly in middle-aged to old large breed or giant breed dogs such as the Labrador Retriever, Golden Retriever, Siberian Husky, Newfoundland, and St. Bernard. Usually these dogs are born with a normal larynx, but over time the nerves and muscles that control the laryngeal cartilages lose function.

Laryngeal paralysis may also be congenital in some breeds (e.g. Bouvier des Flandres, Dalmatians, Siberian Huskies, and bulldogs), appearing in dogs between two and six months of age. Affected puppies may have difficulty swallowing and breathing, they may gag frequently, and their bark often sounds abnormal. In Dalmatians it is part of another condition called 'laryngeal paralysis-polyneuropathy complex.' Affected puppies should not be used for breeding.

Choke collars are not thought to be a significant risk factor for this disorder. However, after LP is diagnosed it is usually recommended to stop using a collar or anything else around the dog's neck and to switch to a harness instead.

The University College Dublin researchers discovered genetic markers related to the recurrent Roarer Syndrome (RLN) which will lead to genetic testing development for identification of three-times higher risk horses.

== Signs ==
Signs of laryngeal paralysis include voice change (the dog's bark becomes hoarse-sounding), gagging or coughing (often during or after eating or drinking), exercise intolerance, inspiratory stridor (noisy breathing on inspiration), difficulty breathing, and in severe cases cyanosis or syncope (fainting). Secondary problems may also occur, including aspiration or edema in the lungs, though often the problem remains an upper respiratory problem. Affected dogs are vulnerable to heat stroke and heat exhaustion due to their limited ability to cool themselves down by panting, but the disorder itself can be mistaken for heat stroke.

Signs may occur at any time, but initially owners may only notice that their dog's bark sounds different, that their dog can't run as much as before, or that the dog has trouble in hot weather in unilateral cases because the unaffected side can compensate for the paralysed side. However most unilateral cases will eventually progress to include both sides of the larynx, a more serious problem with symptoms appearing more often.

Signs are usually worse in hot and humid weather, during exercise, during times of stress or excitement, and in obese pets. Acute or late-stage symptoms are usually unmistakable and require immediate emergency treatment.

== Diagnosis ==
This condition is usually diagnosed by direct examination of the larynx under light sedation, which also allows checking for benign or malignant tumors. Tests, such as thoracic radiographs, CT-scans, or echocardiography, are sometimes needed to rule out heart, lung, or mediastinal diseases or other possible causes of the symptoms often seen with LP. Some vets may also recommend running a thyroid profile since LP can be a symptom or complication of hypothyroidism.

== Treatment ==
Mild cases are managed by limiting activity, keeping a healthy body weight, and avoiding exposure to high ambient temperatures. Mild sedatives can be used to decrease anxiety and panting and therefore improve respiration. Corticosteroids may also be administered in acute cases to decrease inflammation and edema of the larynx.

Severe acute symptoms, such as difficulty breathing, hyperthermia, or aspiration pneumonia, must be stabilized with sedatives and oxygen therapy and may require steroid or antibiotic medications. Sometimes a tracheotomy is required to allow delivery of oxygen. Once the patient is stabilized, surgical treatment may be beneficial especially when paralysis occurs in both arytenoid cartilages (bilateral paralysis). The surgery (aretynoid lateralization, or a "laryngeal tieback") consists of suturing one of the aretynoid cartilages in a maximally abducted (open) position. This reduces the signs associated with inadequate ventilation (such as exercise intolerance or overheating) but may exacerbate the risk of aspiration and consequent pneumonia. Tying back only one of the arytenoid cartilages instead of both helps reduce the risk of aspiration. Afterwards the dog will still sound hoarse, and will need to be managed in the same way as those with mild cases of LP.

Recent studies have found that many dogs with laryngeal paralysis have decreased motility of their esophagus. Animals with a history of regurgitation or vomiting should be fully evaluated for esophageal or other gastrointestinal disorders. Dogs with megaesophagus or other conditions causing frequent vomiting or regurgitation are at high risk for aspiration pneumonia after laryngeal tie-back. Permanent tracheostomy is an alternative surgical option for these dogs to palliate their clinical signs.

== Complications of surgical treatment ==
Besides complications of surgery and anesthesia in general, there may be drainage, swelling, or redness of the incision, gagging or coughing during eating or drinking, or pneumonia due to aspiration of food or liquids. Undesirable complications are estimated to occur in 10-30% of cases. If medical therapy is unsuccessful and surgery cannot be performed due to concurrent disease (such as heart or lung problems) or cost, euthanasia may be necessary if the animal's quality of life is considered unacceptable due to the disease.
