= Lion dog (disambiguation) =

Lion dogs are Chinese guardian lions, traditional Chinese architectural ornaments.

Lion dog may also refer to the following dog breeds:

- Rhodesian Ridgeback, or African Lion Dog, bred for hunting lions
- Leonberger, also known as the "Gentle Lion"
- Löwchen, or Little Lion Dog, a small non-sporting dog
- Maltese dog, or Maltese Lion Dog, a breed of companion dog originating in Malta
- Shih Tzu or Chinese Lion Dog, a breed of dog in the toy group

== See also ==
- Komainu, Japanese statues resembling Chinese guardian lions
- Shisa, Okinawan statues derived from Chinese guardian lions
- Lhasa Apso, a non-sporting dog breed originating in Tibet
- Chow Chow, a spitz-type of dog breed
- Pekingese, a Chinese breed of companion dog whose origin story involves lion
- Tibetan Terrier, a Tibetan breed of dog
