= Dog Aging Project =

Study of aging in dogs with human implications

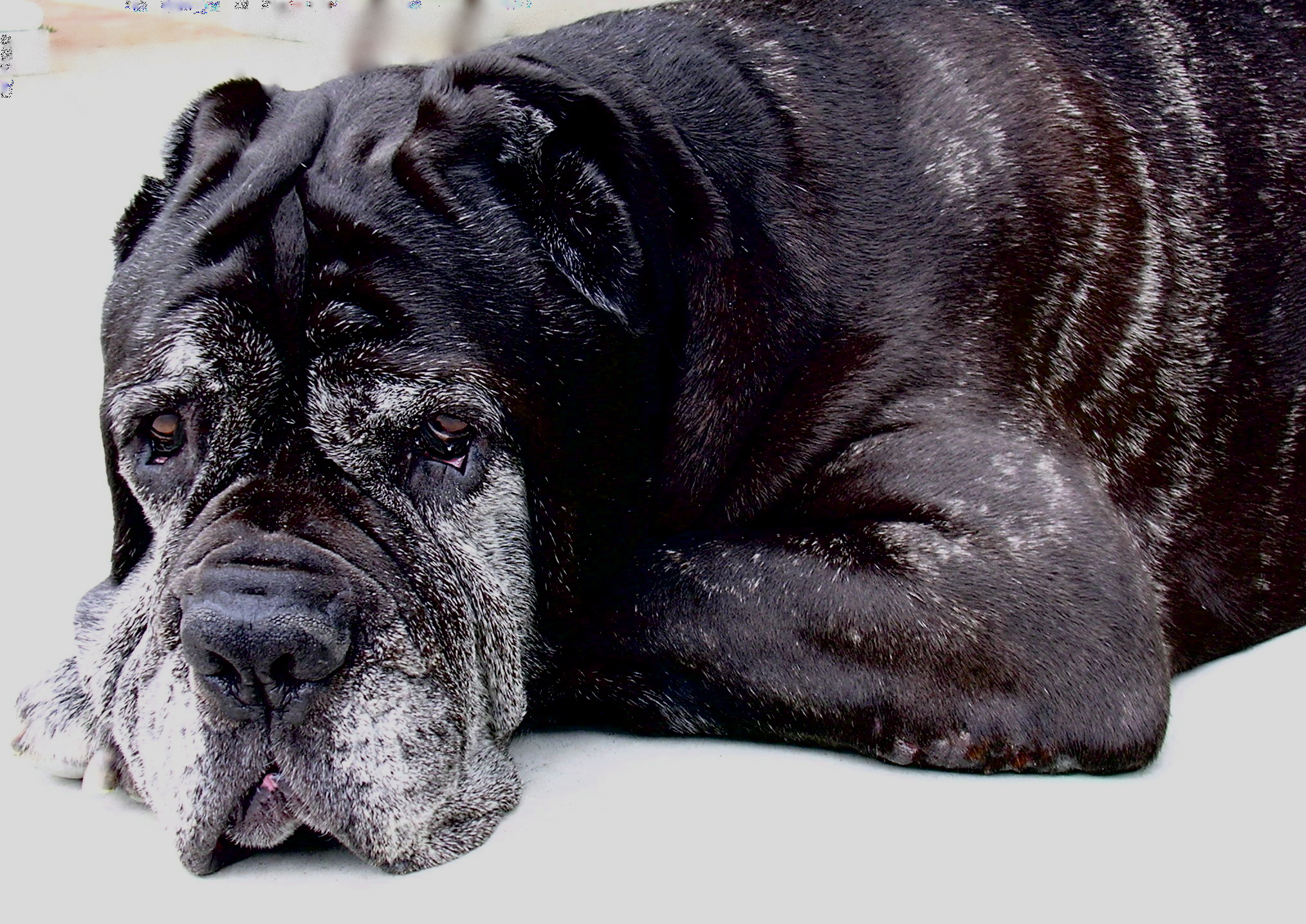
A 10-year old Mastiff, showing the natural signs of aging in dogs.

The Dog Aging Project is a long-term biological study of aging in dogs, centered at the University of Washington. The project investigate how lifestyle and genetic factors influence dog longevity. The Dog Aging Project was founded in 2014 and received a US$200,000 seed grant from the University of Washington. It has also received funding from small private donors, an example of crowdfunding. Professor Daniel Promislow is the director of the project. Its Chief Veterinarian is Dr. Kate Creevy.

== Description and history ==
The project primarily focuses on research to understand dog aging through the collection and analysis of big data through citizen science. Additionally, a small component of the project explores the use of pharmaceuticals to potentially increase life span of dogs. The project has implications for improving the life spans of humans and is an example of geroscience.

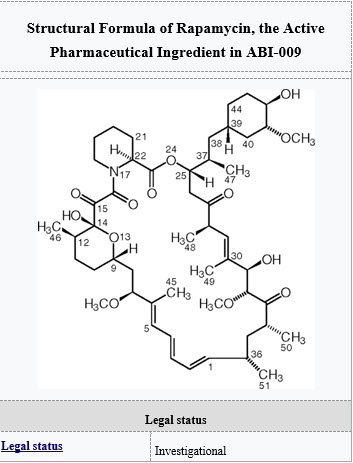
Chemical structure of rapamycin, a pharmaceutical under evaluation for its effects on longevity

The project engages the general public to register their dogs in the studies, and therefore the project is an example of citizen science. As of 2022 nearly 40,000 dogs have been registered with the project. The majority of the dogs will participate in a longitudinal study of 10,000 dogs over a 10-year period conducted across the United States. Individual dogs are followed for the duration of their lives to understand the biological and environmental factors that influence dog longevity. A small subset of those dogs (approximately 500) will be enrolled in a double-blind, placebo-controlled study of the pharmaceutical rapamycin, which has shown signs of extending longevity in species such as mice.

The Dog Aging Project is an open science initiative. The investigators have committed to releasing all anonymized research data to the public domain. The longitudinal study portion of the Dog Aging Project bears some similarity to the Golden Retriever Lifetime Study of the Morris Animal Foundation although with much larger phenotypic diversity. The entire project also shares operational similarities to Darwin's Ark, a citizen science initiative of companion animals with more specific focus on genetics. The initiatives are each managed to ensure the data can be integrated into a powerful master data set.

A premise of the project is that dogs may be a sentinel species for humans since they live in the same environment as humans. The project may thereby help identify risk factors that influence human life span. Since dogs age significantly more rapidly than humans, data on aging can be generated much more rapidly using a dog model than in human studies. A further premise is that the longitudinal portion of the project seeks to understand the underlying biology of aging, as opposed to understanding individual age-related diseases. In this respect, if the aging process itself is addressed, then several age-related diseases could be delayed or avoided simultaneously. This is important because elderly individuals often have multiple chronic disease conditions.

In 2017 the project reported the results of a 10-week trial showing that a small number of dogs that received rapamycin had better heart function than a control group. As of 2018, the National Institute on Aging awarded the Dog Aging Project a five-year grant to support further studies. Researchers from the Texas A&M College of Veterinary Medicine & Biomedical Sciences are also investigators in the study.

In October 2026 the Dog Aging Project received a five year plan renewal along with $29 million in funding from the National Institute of Health. According to UW Medicine this funding will continue research in aging, genetics, nutrition, and environmental factors. In a 2026 study over 41,000 dogs participated in the Dog Aging Project, findings identified that larger dogs and purebred dogs were more likely to have shorter life span. This studied also found that there were 72 factors effecting mortality. This set a plan for future research to look into how these factors influence lifespan.

== Research ==
The project's design was published in 2022; it enrolls pet dogs of all ages and breeds through owner-completed surveys, with subsets providing veterinary records, DNA and biological samples. A "precision cohort" of about 1,000 dogs contributes longitudinal multi-omic data (genome, epigenome, metabolome, microbiome) for geroscience research. De-identified data are released to researchers on a periodic schedule with public codebooks. For eligibility of the dog aging projects all dogs must meet certain requirements, those being that the dog is at least 7 years of age, at least 44 lbs, spayed or neutered, and meet good health qualifications, they also have to be able to attend every routine checkup.

=== Test of Rapamycin in Aging Dogs ===
The Test of Rapamycin in Aging Dogs (TRIAD) is a prospective, parallel-group, double-masked, randomized, placebo-controlled, multicenter trial of rapamycin in healthy middle-aged dogs recruited from project participants, with lifespan and several healthspan measures as endpoints; its investigators describe it as the first rigorous test of a drug against biological aging with such endpoints outside the laboratory in any species. It follows two smaller placebo-controlled trials of rapamycin in companion dogs. The end goal of TRIAD is to see if the drug rapamycin improves overall better body functions and increase of lifespan.
