= Daniel Promislow =

American biogerontologist and professor

Daniel Promislow is a biogerontologist and a professor at the University of Washington. He studies aging through systems biology and metabolomics approaches. He is a director of the Canine Longevity Consortium, and heads up the Dog Aging Project.
