= Kate Creevy =

American veterinarian

Kate E. Creevy
- Medical career
- Profession: Veterinarian
- Institutions: Texas A&M University

Kate E. Creevy is a small animal internist and a professor at Texas A&M College of Veterinary Medicine. She studies the genetic and environmental determinants of healthy aging in companion dogs. She is Chief Veterinarian for the Dog Aging Project.
