= Ortigoza =

Ortigoza is a Spanish surname. Notable people with the surname include:

- José Ortigoza (born 1987), Paraguayan football player
- Matheus Ortigoza, Brazilian football player
- Néstor Ortigoza (born 1984), Argentinian football player

== See also ==
- Ortigosa (disambiguation)
