= Uncle Chichi =

American toy poodle

- Species: Canis lupus familiaris
- Breed: Toy poodle
- Sex: Male
- Born: c. 1985–1988 (adopted c. 1987)
- Died: January 17, 2012 (aged 24–27); New York City
- Owners: Frank Pavich, Janet Puhalovic

Uncle Chichi (c. 1985 – January 17, 2012) was the unofficial world's oldest dog from December 2011 until his death on January 17, 2012. Due to lost birth records, Chichi was not recognized by the Guinness Book of World Records.

Uncle Chichi was adopted from the John Ancrum Society for the Prevention of Cruelty to Animals in Charleston, South Carolina when he was between one and two years old. His owners tried to find veterinary documentation in 2010, but instead learned that the records had been purged. According to the Los Feliz Small Animal Hospital, where Chichi was examined in 2007, his birthdate was reported as January 15, 1988.

== See also ==
- List of oldest dogs
- List of individual dogs
