= Geriatric onset laryngeal paralysis polyneuropathy =

Geriatric onset laryngeal paralysis polyneuropathy (GOLPP), previously described as idiopathic laryngeal paralysis (ILP), is a degenerative polyneuropathy that most commonly occurs in older medium-to-large breed dogs.

Animals with this condition have historically tended to come to veterinary attention when they develop difficulties related to opening and closing the arytenoid cartilages of the larynx in the throat of the animal, causing difficulty with breathing and swallowing, and was therefore for many years the condition was believed to be an idiopathic form of laryngeal paralysis, meaning "of unknown cause". Investigations into idiopathic laryngeal paralysis by two groups (in Michigan and Tennessee) between 2005 and 2013 showed that dogs with ILP did not only suffer dysfunction of the laryngeal nerves; they found that this was just one prominent symptom of what was a very gradually progressing polyneuropathy of old age, which also affected other nerves in the body. This finding, now generally believed correct following further research, has led to the disease commonly being proposed in veterinary discussion and papers, to be renamed from ILP to GOLPP, to better reflect this new understanding since this discovery.

== Epidemiology ==
Medium-to-large breed dogs are most commonly affected by GOLPP, including the Afghan Hound, Golden Retriever, Irish Setter, Labrador Retriever, Rottweiler, St Bernard and standard poodle.
