= Bluey (long-lived dog) =

Australian cattle dog (1910–1939)

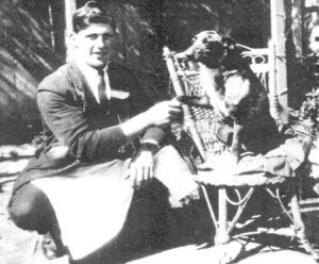
- Les Hall and Bluey in 1936
- Species: Canis familiaris
- Breed: Australian Cattle Dog
- Sex: Female
- Born: 7 June 1910; Rochester, Victoria, Australia
- Died: 14 November 1939 (aged 29); Rochester, Victoria, Australia
- Known for: Verified oldest lived dog
- Owners: Les and Rosalie Hall

Bluey (7 June 1910 – 14 November 1939) was a female Australian Cattle Dog owned by Les and Rosalie Hall of Rochester, Victoria. She holds the Guinness World Record as the oldest verified dog to have ever lived. The record was briefly disputed by Bobi, but Bobi's certification was revoked by Guinness due to the lacking evidence, after veterinarians came forward challenging Bobi's claimed age. Additionally, Bluey's title was also challenged by many other dogs including Max, Chilla, Maggie, and Bella, though they were never verified.

== Life ==
Bluey was born 7 June 1910 in Rochester, Victoria, Australia and was acquired by William Hall in 1910. After William's death, Bluey was passed to his son Les and his wife. It is claimed Bluey worked as a cattle and sheep dog for about 20 years before retiring. According to Guinness World Records, Bluey was the oldest-lived dog ever verified, having lived 29 years and 5 months (1910–1939) before being euthanised.

Many other owners have also made claims for longer-lived dogs—including Max, Maggie, and Bella—however, these claims have not been independently verified. Despite attempts to overthrow her record, as of 2026, Bluey still holds the title.

Bluey was a loyal dog who spent time in the backyard and was incredibly loyal to her owners. She used to follow her owner's wife, up the street of their shop and sit outside with the carriage until she came out, where she would then walk with her home. Because Bluey's town, Rochester, was so small and her owner (Les) was the main grocer for several years, everyone knew Bluey and the whole town was deeply affected by her death in 1939.

Due to the record-breaking claims made by other dog owners like Bobi, Max, Bella, and Maggie, Guinness World Records changed their requirements for the title, requiring data from microchips, and documentary evidence for every year of the dog's life.

== Australian Cattle Dog longevity ==
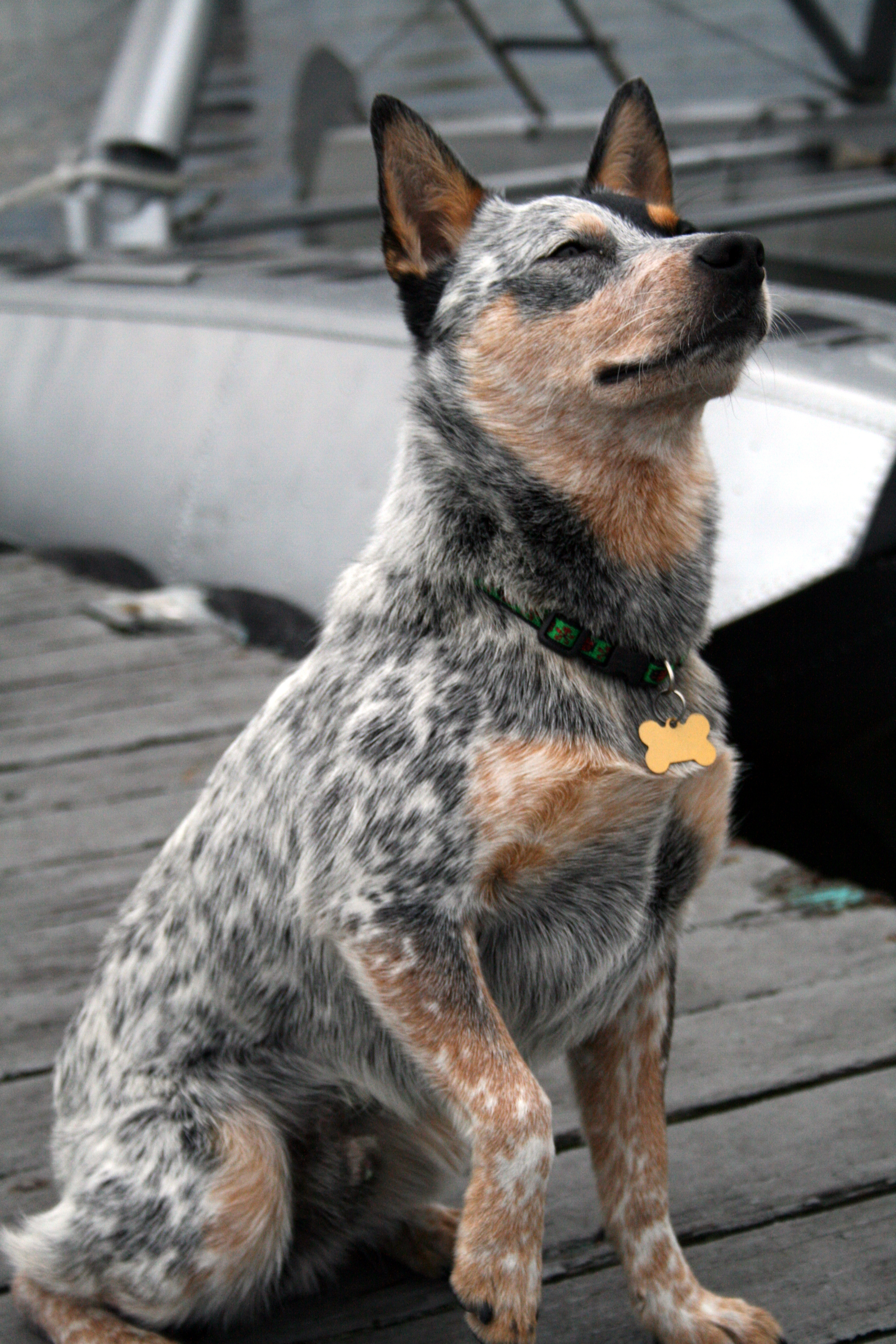
A blue Australian Cattle Dog (Bluey's breed)

Bluey's age, along with that of "Chilla", a Labrador Retriever and Australian Cattle Dog mix reported to have lived to the age of 32 years and 3 days (but not certified by Guinness), prompted a study of the longevity of the Australian Cattle Dog to examine if the breed might have exceptional longevity. In general, the heavier and larger a dog is, the shorter its lifespan. The 100-dog survey yielded a mean longevity of 13.41 years with a standard deviation of 2.36 years. The study concluded that while Australian Cattle Dogs do live almost a year longer than most dogs of other breeds in the same weight class on average, the cases of both Bluey and Chilla should be regarded as uncharacteristic exceptions rather than as indicators of typical longevity across this entire breed.

== See also ==
- List of longest-living dogs
- List of individual dogs
