= Ortigosa de Pestaño =

- Municipality
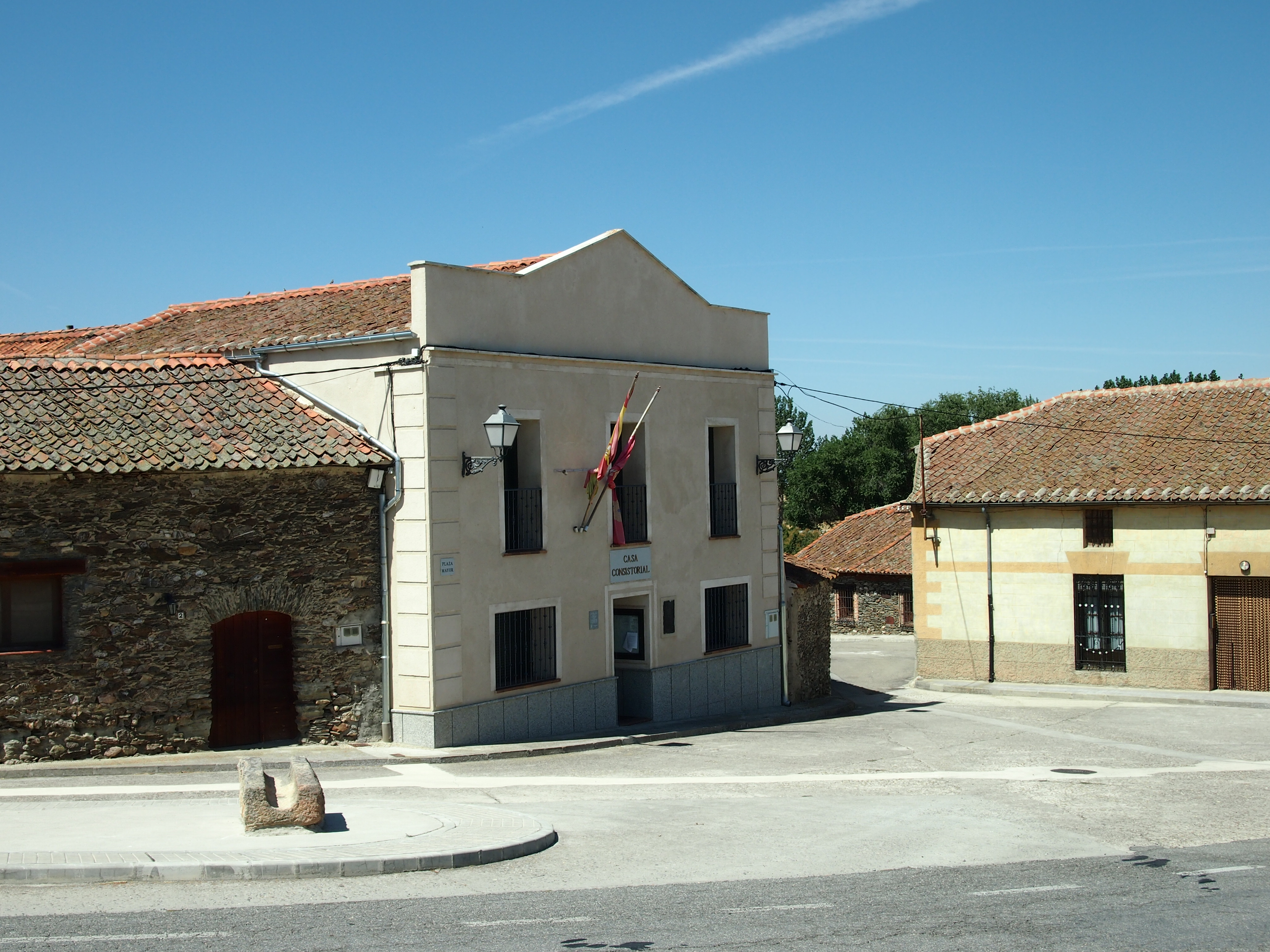
- View of the Town Hall and the square called Plaza Mayor in Ortigosa de Pestaño, Segovia (Spain)

- Location in Spain. Ortigosa de Pestaño (Spain)
- Coordinates: 41°05′15″N 4°23′42″W
- Country: Spain
- Autonomous community: Castile and León
- Province: Segovia
- Municipality: Ortigosa de Pestaño

Area
  - Total: 8 km^{2} (3.1 sq mi)

Population (2025-01-01)
  - Total: 51
  - Density: 6.4/km^{2} (17/sq mi)
- Time zone: UTC+1 (CET)
  - Summer (DST): UTC+2 (CEST)
- Website: Official website

Ortigosa de Pestaño is a municipality located in the province of Segovia, Castile and León, Spain. According to the 2004 census (INE), the municipality has a population of 104 inhabitants.
