= Bobi (dog) =

Revoked Guinness World Record holder for oldest dog ever

- Bobi in 2023, sitting next to his Guinness World Record certificate
- Species: Dog (Canis familiaris)
- Breed: Rafeiro do Alentejo
- Sex: Male
- Born: 11 May 1992 (Note: Allegedly); Conqueiros, Leiria, Portugal
- Died: 21 October 2023 (aged 31); Conqueiros, Leiria, Portugal
- Known for: Claim by owner of being the world's oldest ever lived dog.; Listing in Guinness World Records, before having claim revoked upon investigation
- Owner: Costa family

Bobi (Portuguese pronunciation: [bɔˈβi], 11 May 1992 – 21 October 2023) was a male purebred Rafeiro do Alentejo dog cared for by Leonel Costa of Conqueiros, Leiria, Portugal. Bobi was claimed by his caretaker to be the oldest dog to ever live and the first dog on record to reach 30 years. On 2 February 2023, Bobi was certified by Guinness World Records as the oldest living dog, along with being the oldest dog on record to ever live. However, after veterinarians became suspicious of his real age, an investigation was pursued. Once his records were revoked, he was stripped of the title. Bobi died on 21 October 2023, reportedly aged 31 years and 163 days.

== Early life ==
According to Bobi's owner, Leonel Costa, Bobi was born as one of four male puppies in an outbuilding where his caretaker's family stored wood. Bobi's brothers were buried alive by Costa's father who did not want to care for any more animals. Bobi's coloration blended in with the wood of the shed where he was born, so Costa's father did not see this fourth pup when he was collecting the others to bury.

== Initial certification ==
Originally certified by Guinness World Records, Bobi was initially confirmed as being the oldest verified living dog as well as the oldest verified dog in history, being 30 years and 266 days old from an evaluation on 1 February 2023. This surpassed the previous record held by Bluey, a female Australian Cattle Dog, who was euthanized on 14 November 1939 at the age of 29 years and 5 months.

On 7 December 2022, in the U.S. state of Ohio, Spike, a 23-year-old chihuahua, was certified as the oldest living dog; however, that title was short-lived, as Bobi's age was verified two weeks later. Spike regained his title as the world's oldest living dog after Bobi's death.

== Investigation of claim ==
On 29 October 2023, Guinness World Records announced it would re-investigate Bobi's age to address veterinarian questions and concerns over the lack of evidence freely available to the public.

Bobi's age was certified at first with the Portuguese government's pet database. However, further investigation revealed that the database never required proof of birth for dogs born before 2008. It also was speculated that the photographs shared of Bobi at a young age were of a different dog due to its markings, but this has never been completely confirmed.

In January 2024, Bobi's title was suspended by Guinness World Records while they carried out their investigation. A month later, Bobi's certification was revoked due to a lack of evidence of his birth date. Following the investigation of Bobi's age, Guinness World Records stated they would require more proof when it came to verifying the oldest dog records and also stated that they would reassess any new evidence when it came to Bobi's record.

== Later life and death ==
The owners stated that Bobi was in reasonably good health for his age, although he had some troubles with walking, eyesight, and breathing. Bobi was not neutered. The Costas attributed Bobi's longevity to a "calm, peaceful environment" and consumption of fresh food rather than conventional dog food. His longevity has also been speculated to be caused by genetics, as his mother lived for 18 years.

In honour of Bobi's 31st birthday, celebrated in 2023, 100 guests were invited to celebrate the occasion, which was marked by eating meat and fish, with a performance by a troupe of dancers.

Bobi died at home on 21 October 2023.

== See also ==
- Aging in dogs
- Bluey - the oldest verified dog
- Creme Puff – the oldest verified cat
- List of individual dogs
- List of longest-living dogs
