= Löwchen =

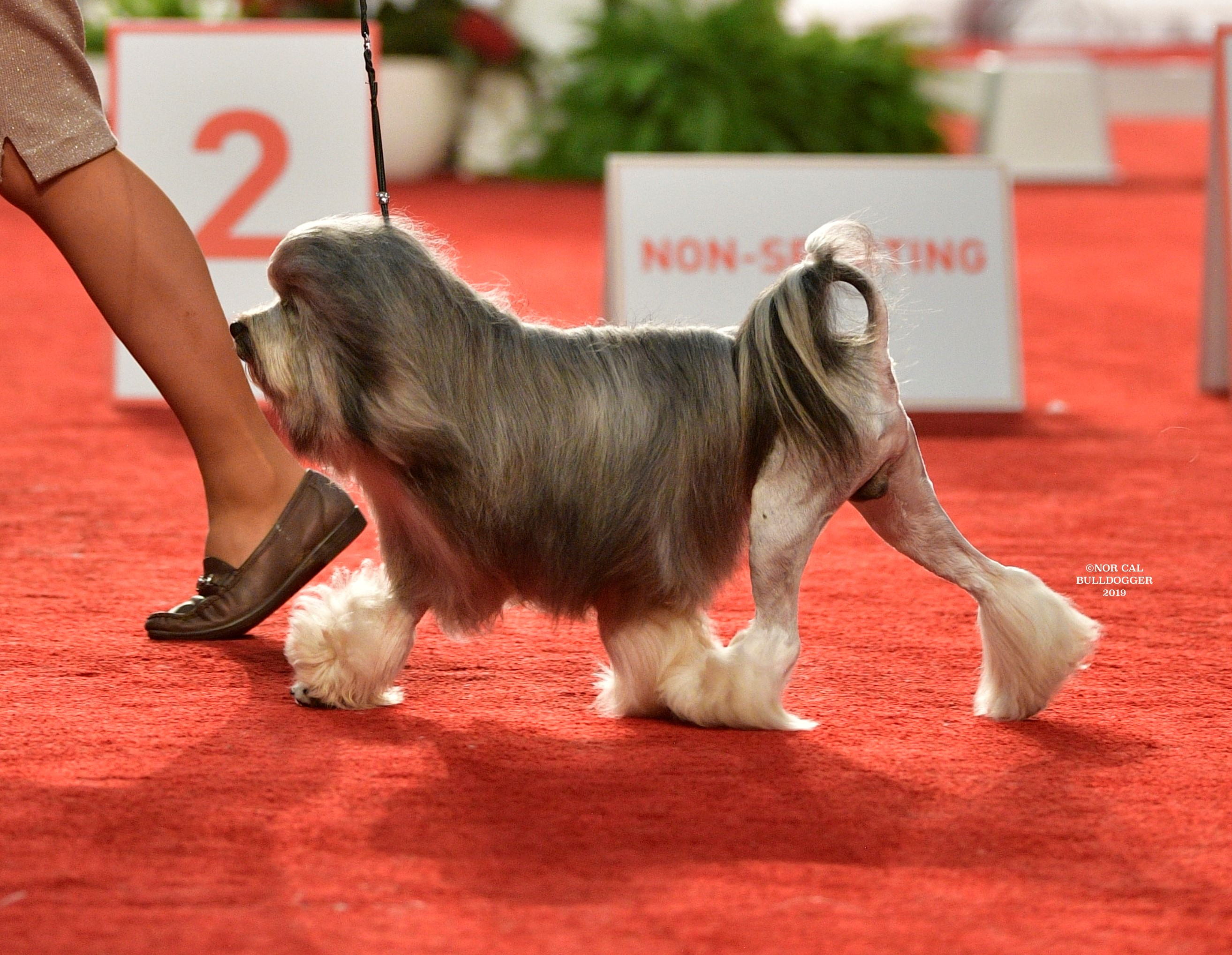
- Löwchen with lion haircut
- Other names: Petit Chien Lion; Little Lion Dog
- Origin: Europe, possibly France in particular
Traits
Height	Males	30–35.6 cm (11.8–14.0 in)
	Females	28–33 cm (11–13 in)
Weight	Males	5.4–8.1 kg (12–18 lb)
	Females	4.5–6.8 kg (9.9–15.0 lb)
Kennel club standards
- Fédération Cynologique Internationale: standard

The Löwchen or Little Lion Dog (German: Löwchen, "little lion"; French: Petit chien lion, "little lion dog") is a breed of small dog. The Löwchen once had the dubious distinction, like the Portuguese Water Dog and the Havanese, of being the rarest dog in the world. In 1973 there were only 65 registered examples of the breed. Even today, the breed generally has fewer than a few hundred new registrations each year worldwide.

== Description ==
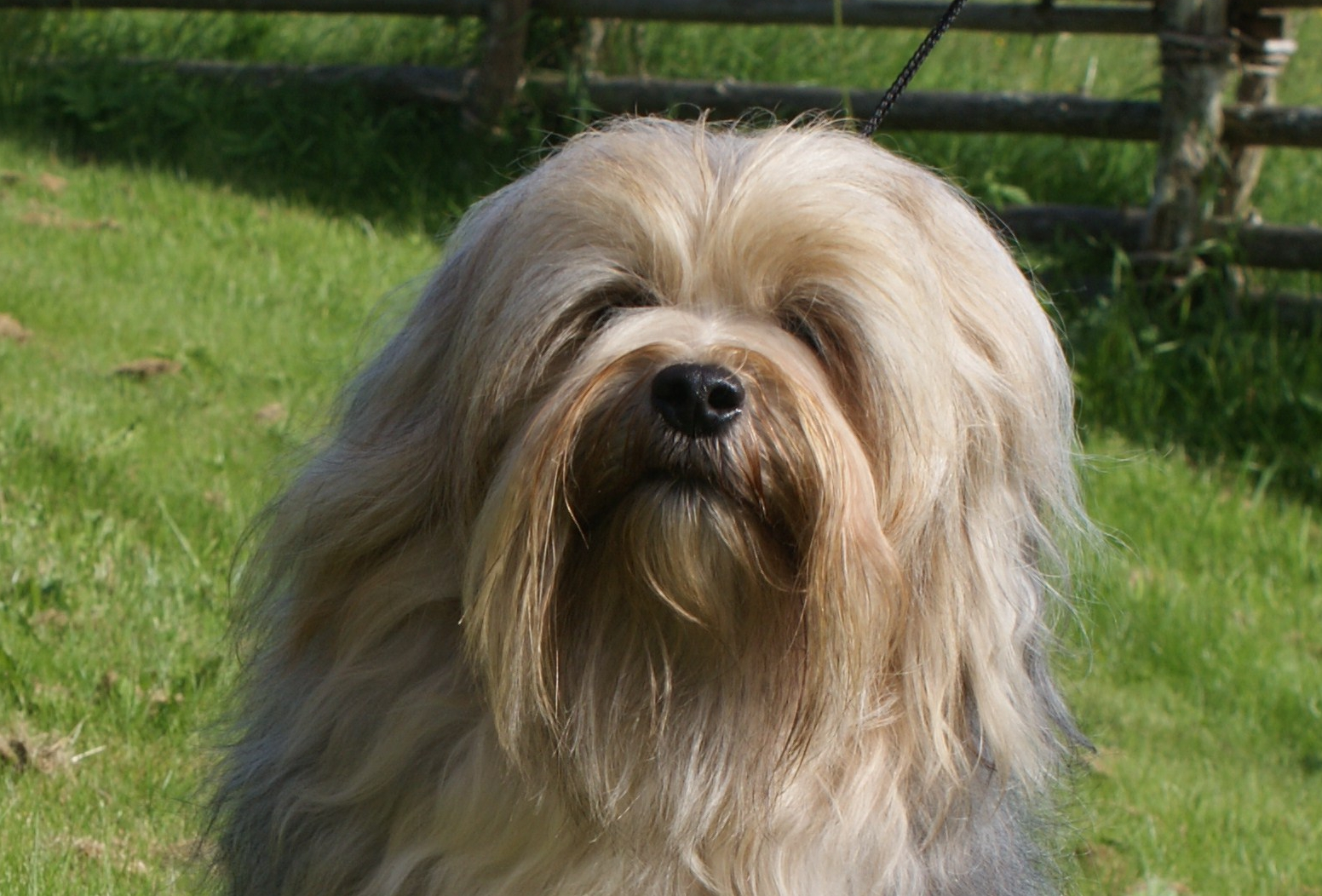
Löwchen head

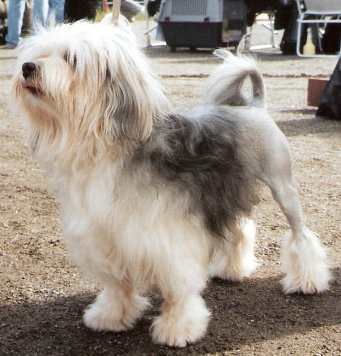
Löwchen aka Little Lion Dog

The Löwchen is a compact companion breed with slightly off square proportions and balanced moderate angles in the front and rear. The silhouette of the breed calls for a long mane in the front with a flat topline. The Löwchen tail should be set coming off the topline and be over the back in the shape of a tea cup handle in movement.

The Löwchen's coat is long and flowing and comes in many colours. The coat should not be thin and fluffy like a Bichon Frise, but fairly straight with waves. It is a multi-texture coat with a 50/50 mix of silkier thicker hairs and softer hair. This allows for an easy to maintain coat that is silky to the touch. Löwchen coat should not be harsh, wooly or cottony. The Löwchen does not shed, and this breed has very low allergic effects, and are considered hypoallergenic. However, that there is no such thing as a completely hypoallergenic dog. The saliva and skin or dander, of a dog can still trigger an allergic event in sensitive people.

The head of the Löwchen is one of its most important features, with its relatively wide muzzle, broad skull, lively round eyes, and pendulant ears. They can come in all colours with dark pigmentation around the eye rings and nose. The head, when in proportion to the body, is neither too big nor too small, but helps to emphasize the friendly, regal, and leonine personality of the Löwchen. The litter size is usually between two and five puppies. The Löwchen's life span is around 14 to 18 years.

=== Lion cut ===
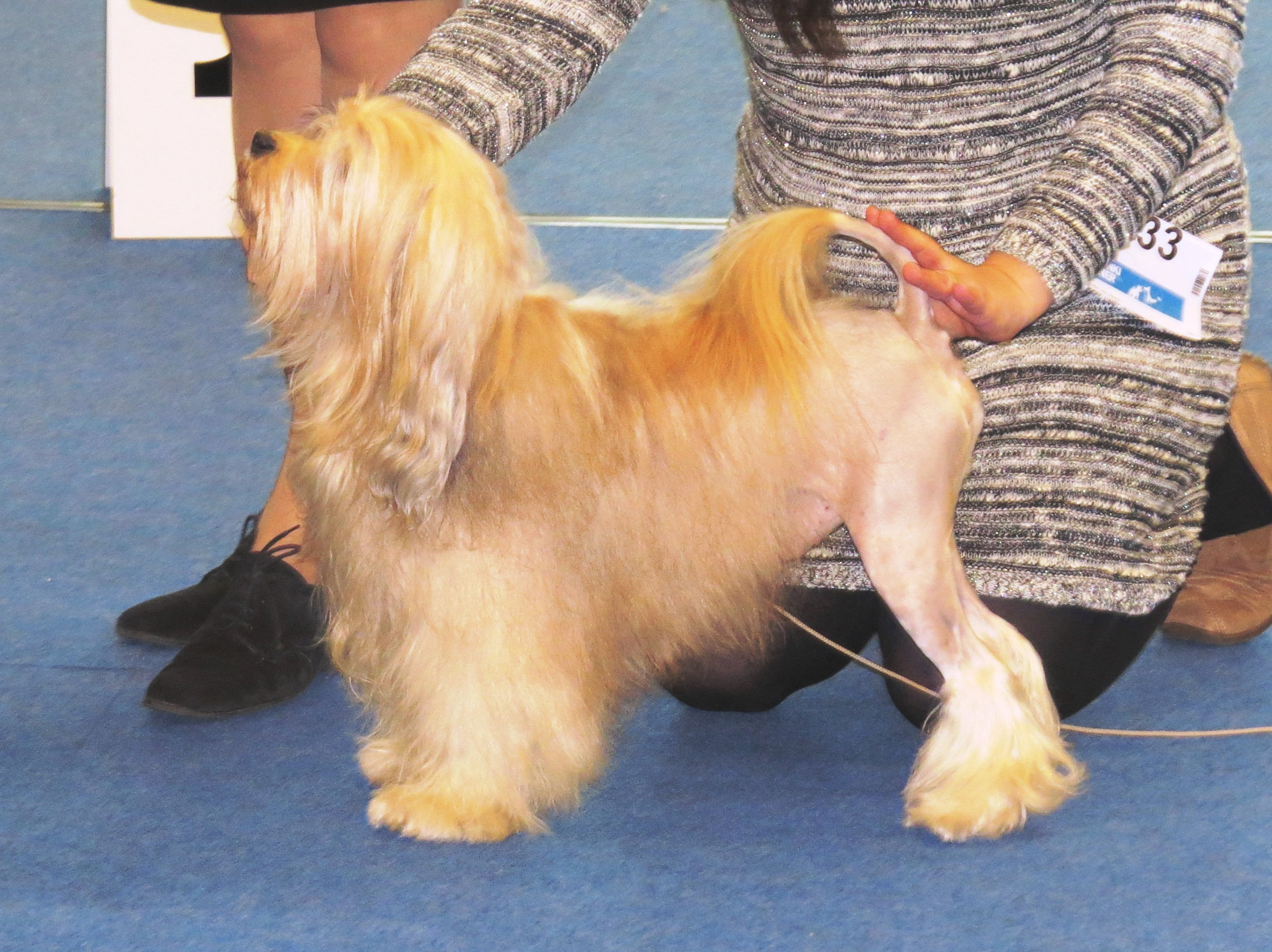
Löwchen with golden coat

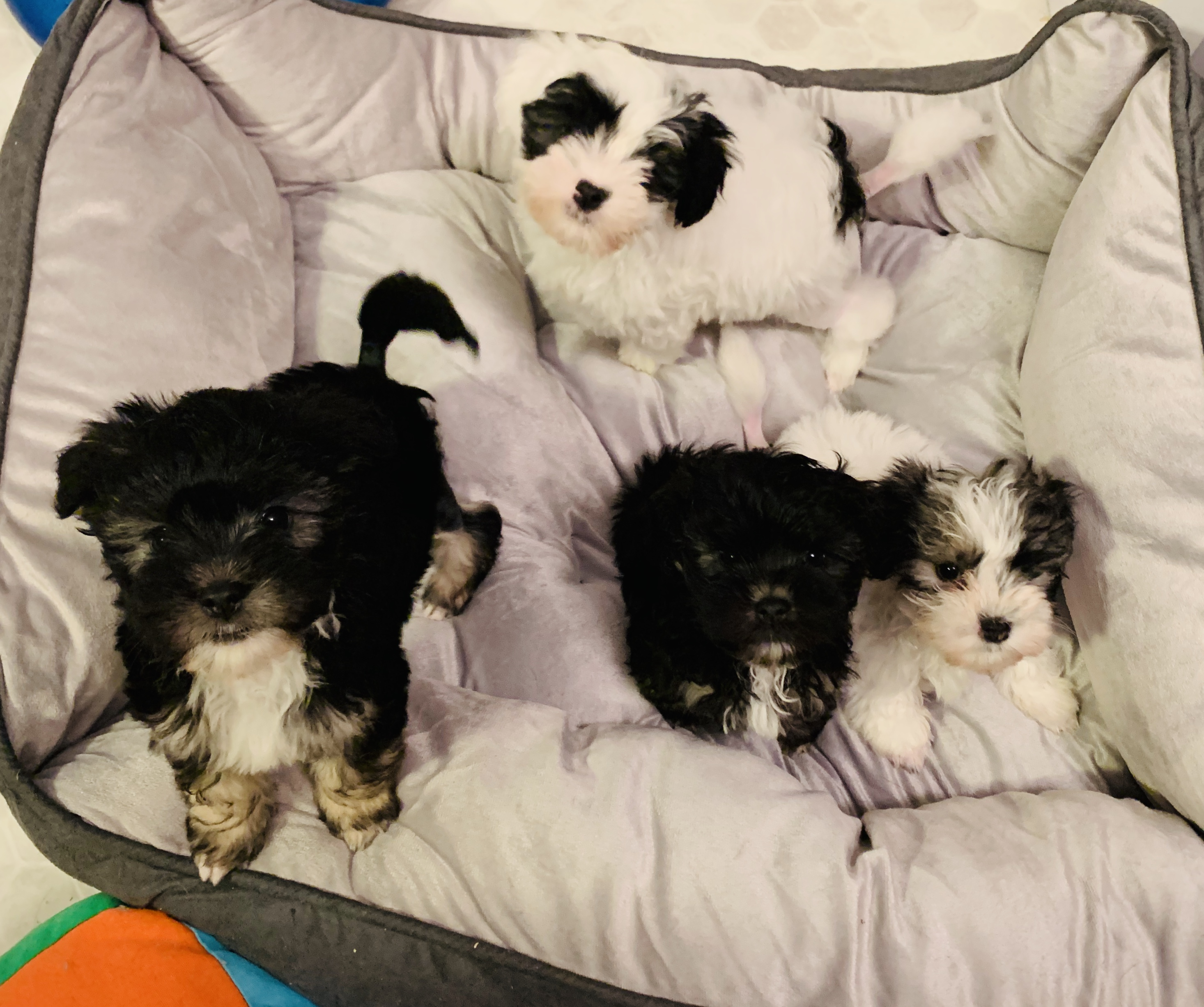
Multiple Color Lowchens in Litter

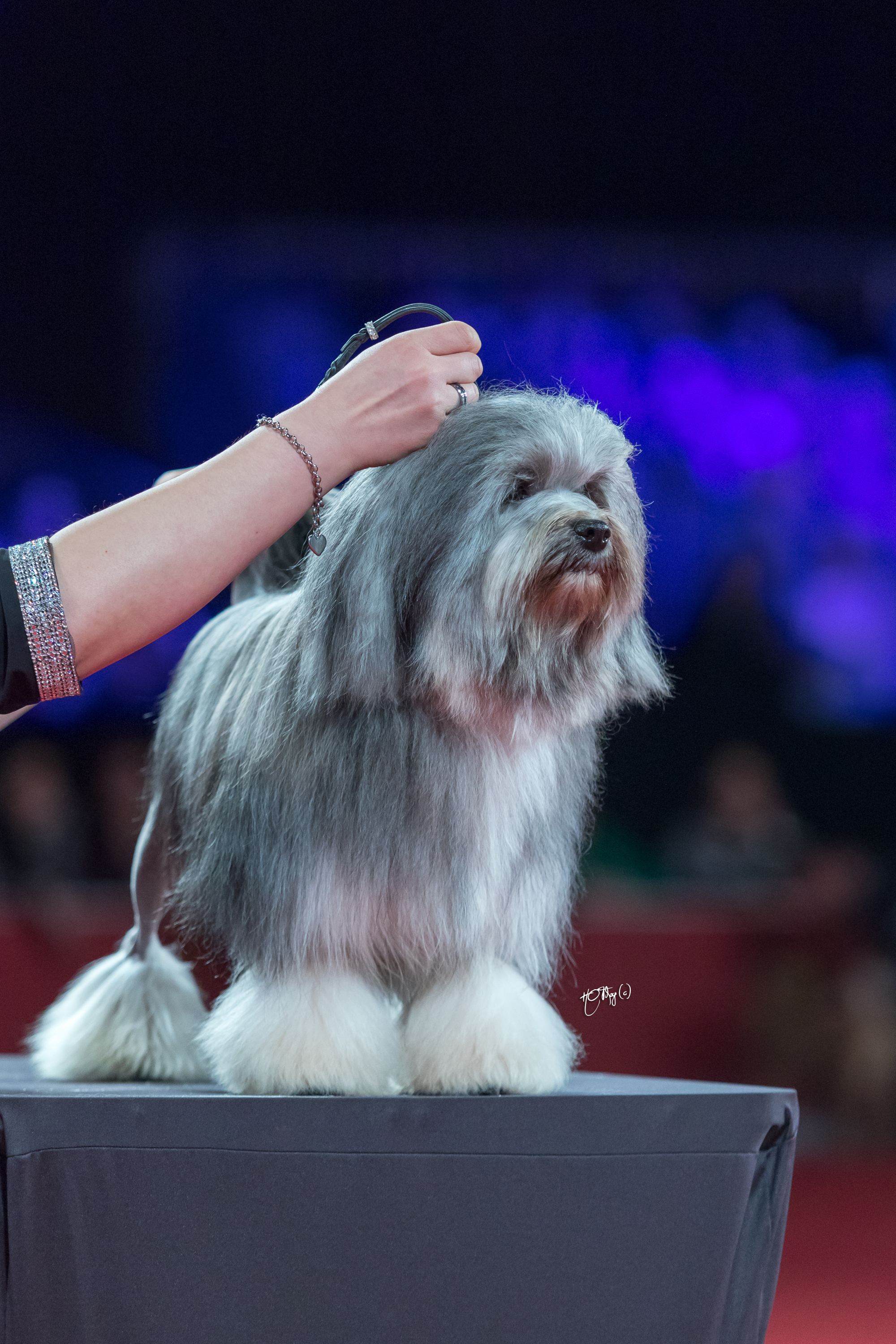
Lowchen at 2019 American Kennel Club National Championship

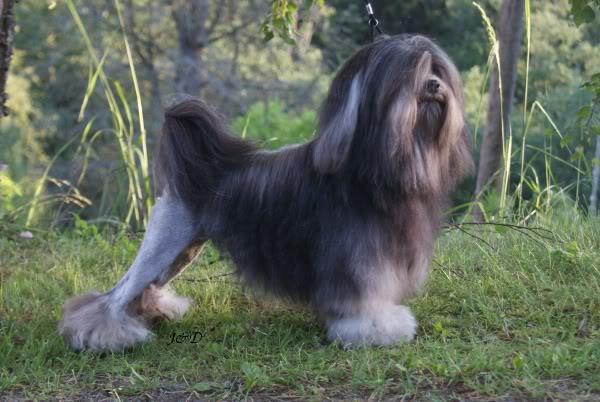
Löwchen in a lion cut

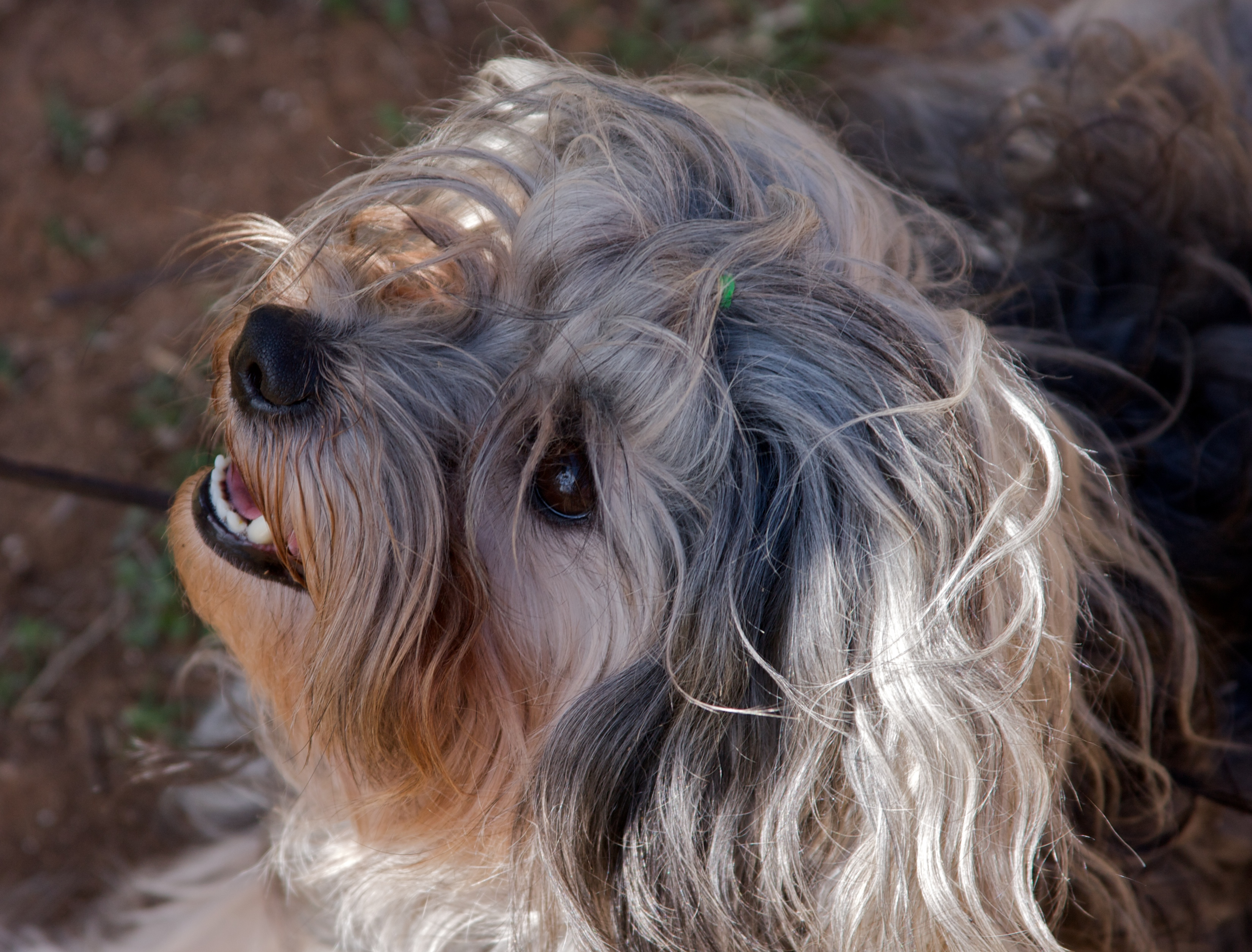
Löwchen dog

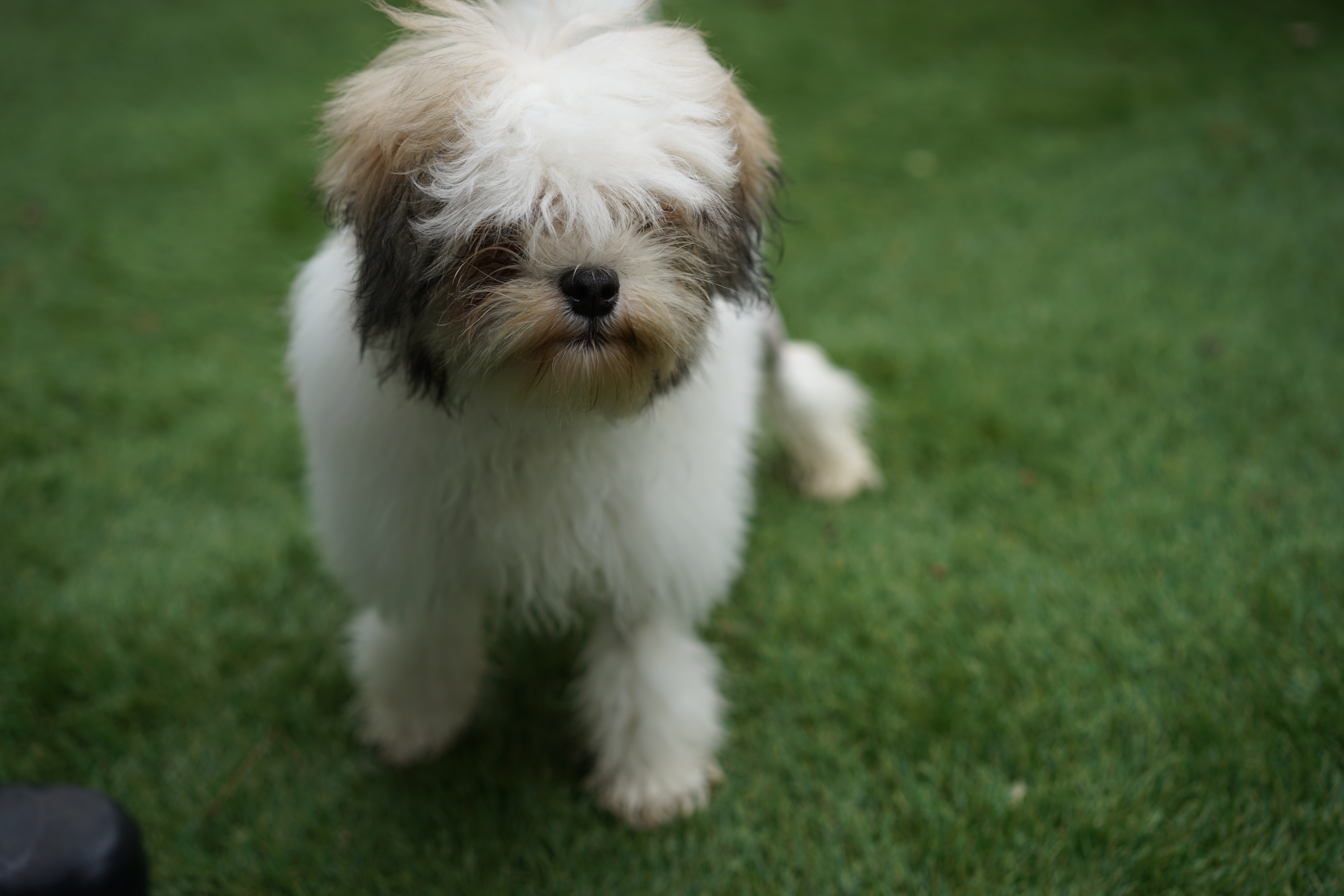
Brown Parti Color Lowchen

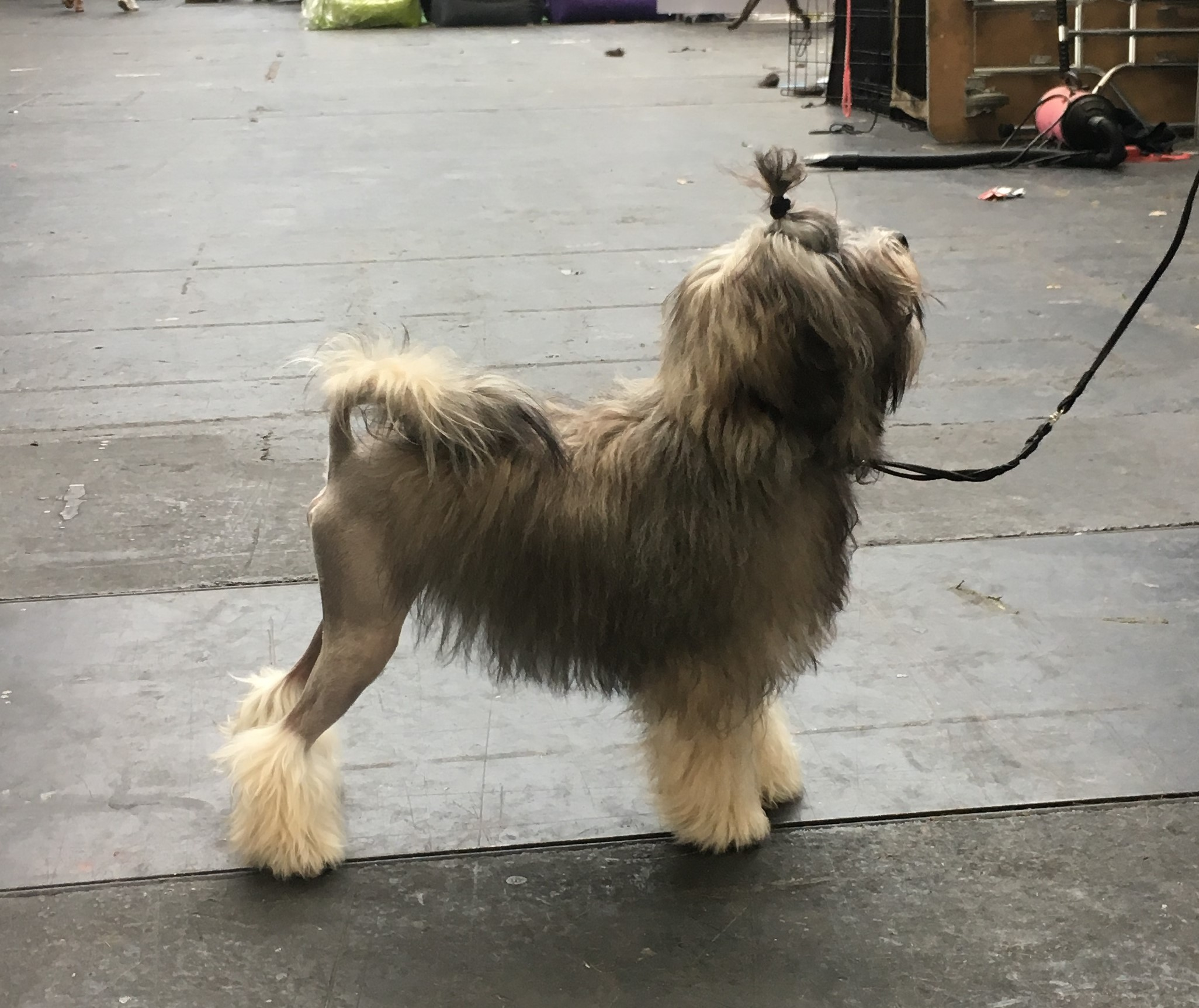
9 month old Sable and Cream Lowchen

The Löwchen's long and wavy coat can be presented in a lion cut. This means that the rear, back legs (except the hocks), front legs (except 1/2 bracelets around the forearm), and the 1/3–1/2 of the tail closest to the body are shaved, and the rest of the coat is left natural to give the dog the appearance of a male lion. The lion cut is the traditional way of presenting these dogs. It is speculated that the lion clip was to allow the naked areas to provide warmth to their owners while the long coat would collect lice and nits from their owners. Dogs in lion clip may need some protection in wintertime on the shaved parts.

=== Colour ===
Löwchen can come in a variety of colors, and their colors can change throughout their lives. Many that are born dark will lighten up into cream or silver. You will also find a variety of colors within a single litter. Common colors are sable, silver, cream, white, parti, Irish pied, chocolate, and red/gold. A less common color is brindle. The American Kennel Club standard does not give preference to any color.

=== Temperament ===
The Löwchen is a friendly, healthy, and happy dog. Dogs of this breed are both active and playful, and very intelligent. The Löwchen is an excellent house pet. The Löwchen makes also a good pet for families with children. This breed has a history as a companion dog and the dogs need the attention of humans and they are not happy left alone for longer periods of time. The Löwchen can be vocal in excitement or demands, though some can be quiet.

=== Health ===
A 2024 UK study found a life expectancy of 13.9 years from a sample of 50 deaths for the breed compared to an average of 12.7 for purebreeds and 12 for crossbreeds.

== History ==
The breed is found in many countries as far back as the sixteenth century. The little 'lion dog' is seen in many art pieces featuring dogs as far back as the sixteenth century, but it is unclear whether these were all dogs like the Löwchen, or simply small dogs of the Bichon type that were trimmed in a lion cut. Although this dog may be related to the Bichon Frise, the Löwchen's history remains obscure.

The Löwchen has a history as a companion dog to the wealthy and elite. It is possible to trace the modern history of the breed to late-19th-century enthusiasts in what are now Belgium, Germany and the Netherlands. It is thought the breed's ancestors were dogs that were brought in by travelers from the far eastern lands of Tibet and mingled with local dogs such as Spitz and terrier-type dogs. Occasionally a genetic throw-back is found. Madame Bennerts started a breeding program in 1944, later with the help of veterinarian Dr. Rickert.

Lowchen were imported into Britain in 1968 and the breed was accorded Kennel Club (UK) recognition in 1971. The Lowchen would finally make an appearance in America in 1971, by way of England. At this time, the Löwchen was still known as the “Little Lion Dog”. Also in 1971, The Löwchen Club of America (LCA) was formed and the breed's name was officially changed to “Löwchen ”. The Lowchen was accepted into the American Kennel Club Miscellaneous class in 1996, and then fully recognized into the non-sporting group in 1999.

The number of Lowchen worldwide continues to fall with the breed being listed as at risk for extinction. An effort to keep the breed from becoming extinct was started along with efforts across other rare breeds.

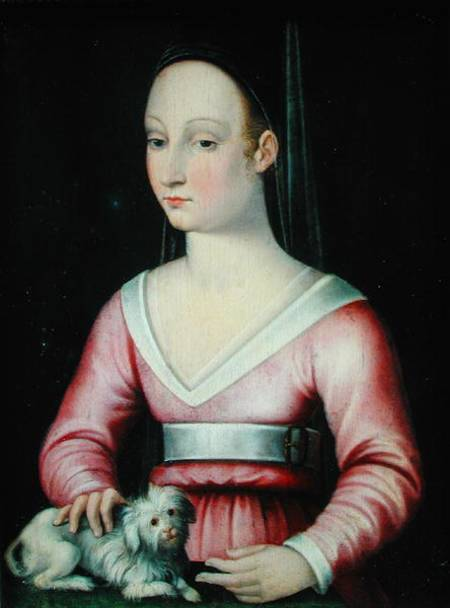
Portrait of Agnès Sorel (1422–1450) with a little dog in lion cut.

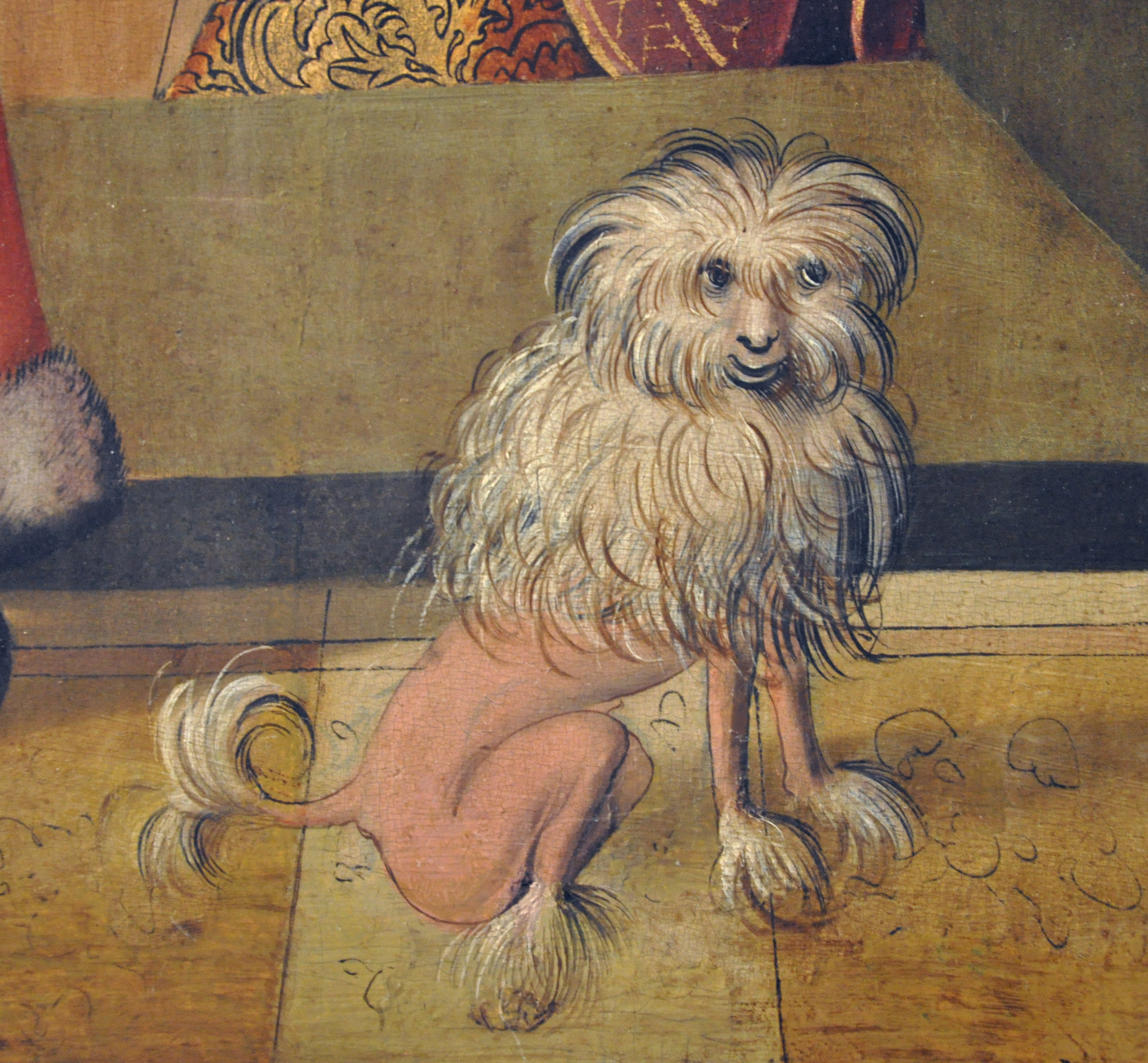
Dog depicted in lion cut, 1505.

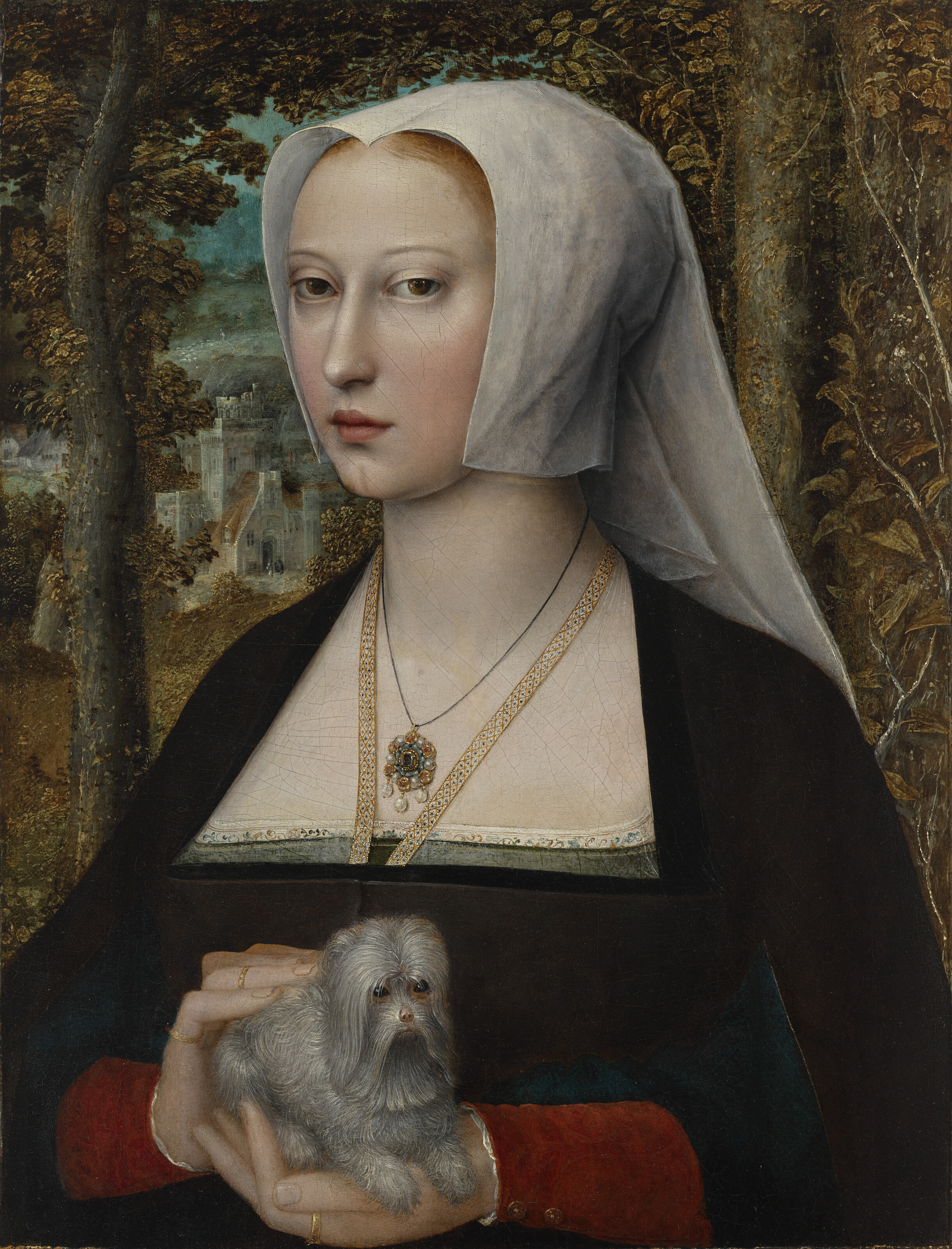
Portrait of a Lady Holding a Lapdog, c. 1520–30, Adriaen Isenbrandt

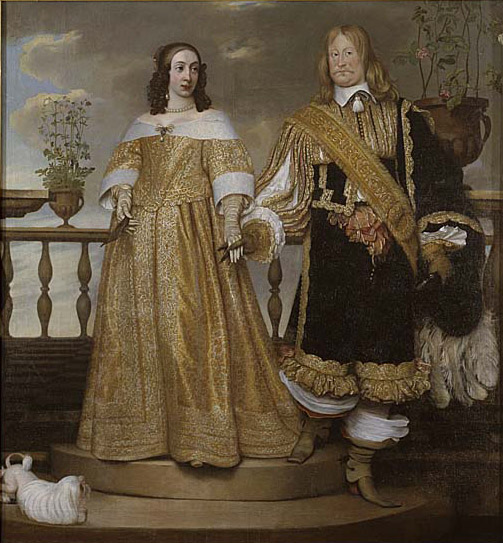
Wedding portrait of Magnus Gabriel De la Gardie and Maria Eufrosyne, 1653. Beside them, a little dog in lion cut.

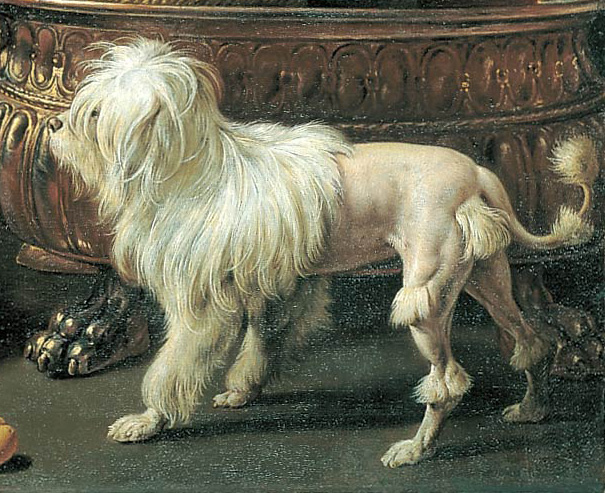
Old Dutch painting, of Adriaen van Utrecht, detail of the dog.

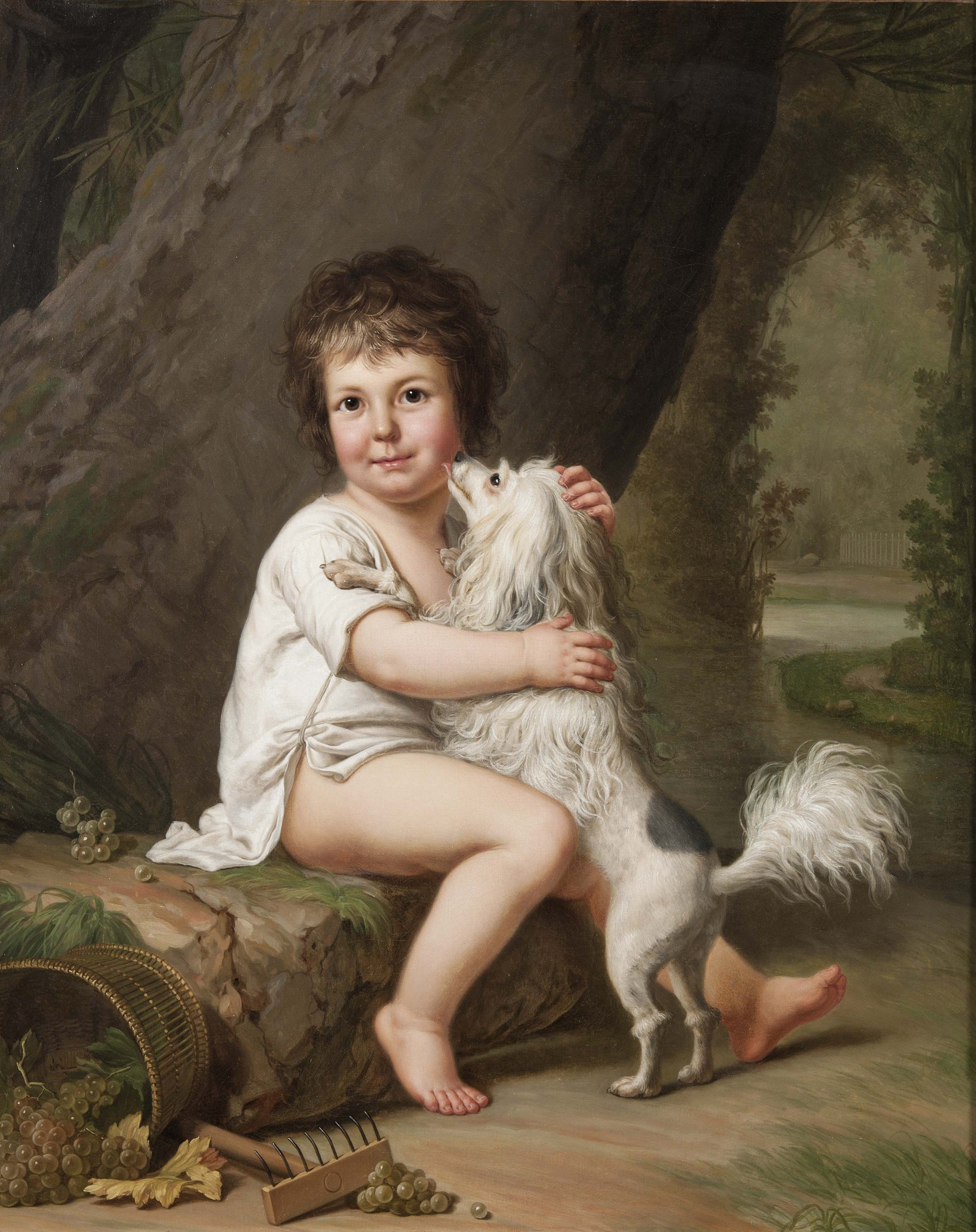
Two-year-old Henri Bertholet-Campan with his dog in lion cut, by Ulrik Wertmüller, 1786.

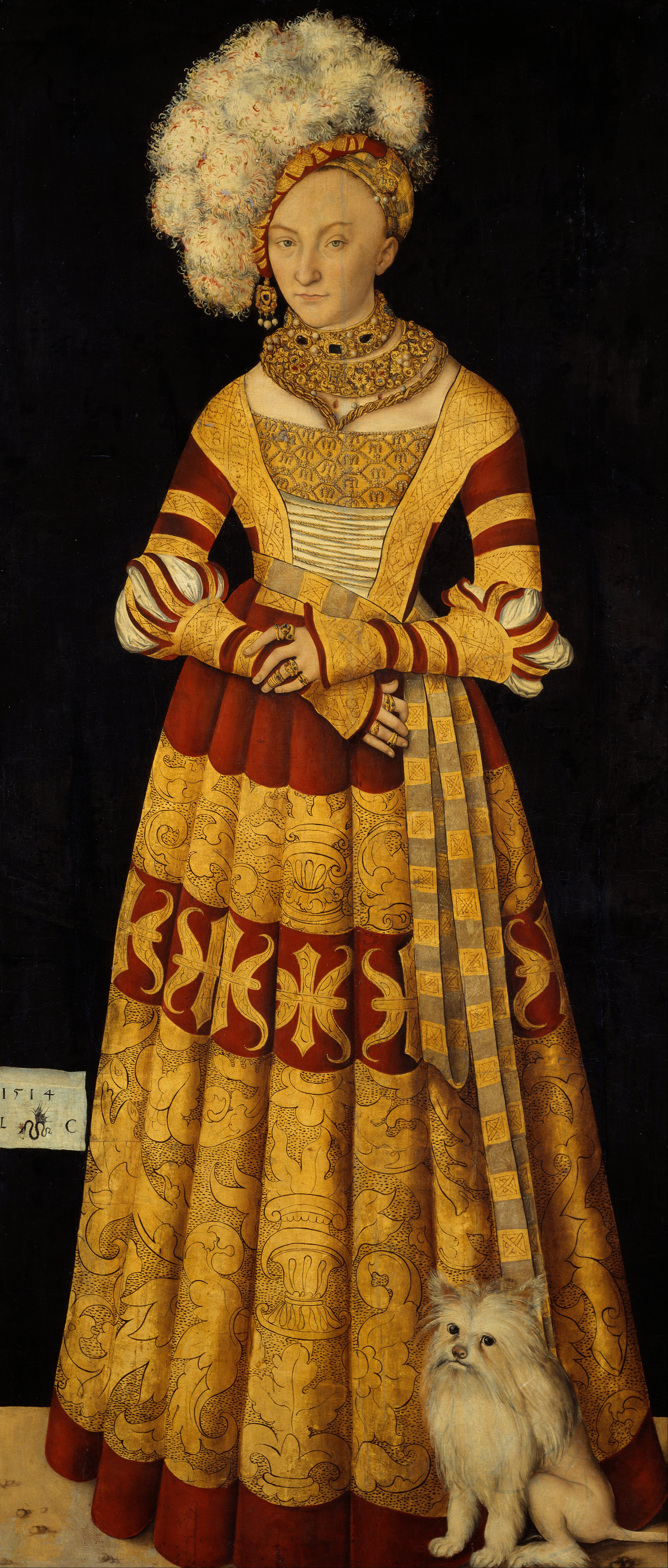
Duchess Katharina von Mecklenburg, by Lucas Cranach the Elder, painted 1514, showing dog in lion cut.

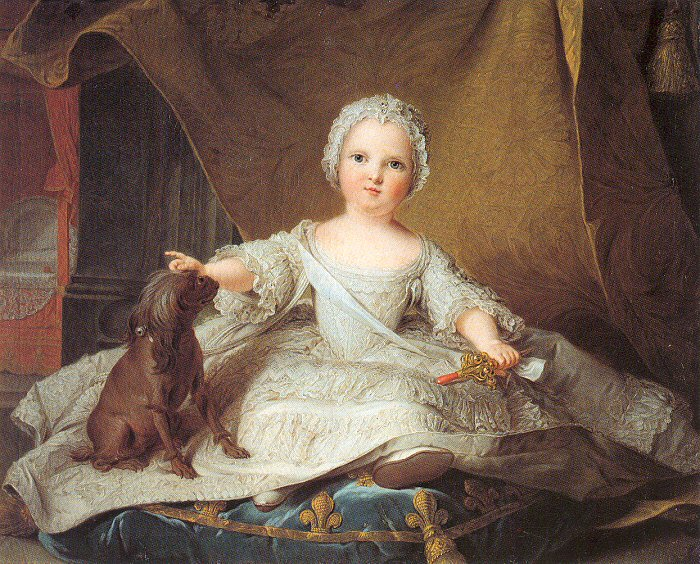
Portrait of Princess Marie Zéphyrine of France (1750–1755) with her dog in lion cut.

Archduchess Maria Christina, Duchess of Teschen (1742–1798), with her dog in lion cut.

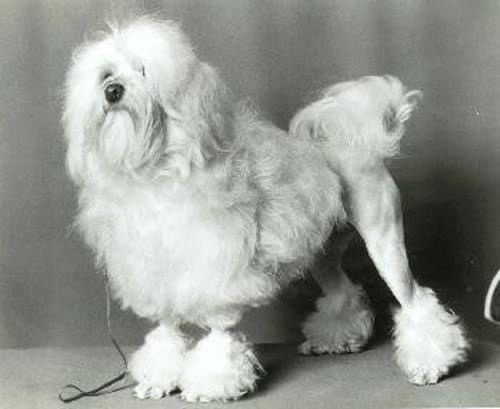
Quinbury Fiesta Fashion, a female Lowchen imported to New Zealand

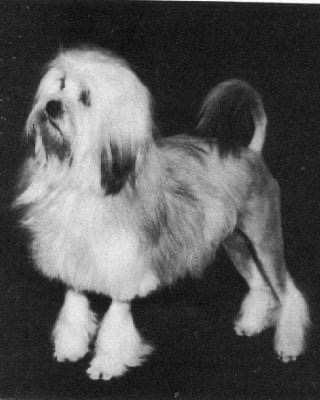
Duncara Sapphire female Lowchen

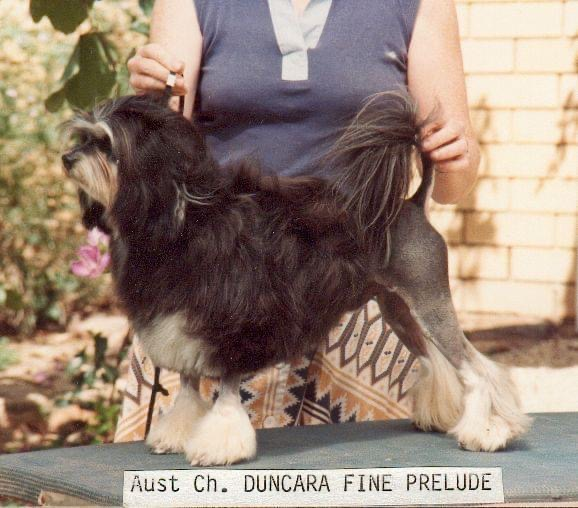
Duncara Fine Prelude, a Lowchen in exhibition in Australia

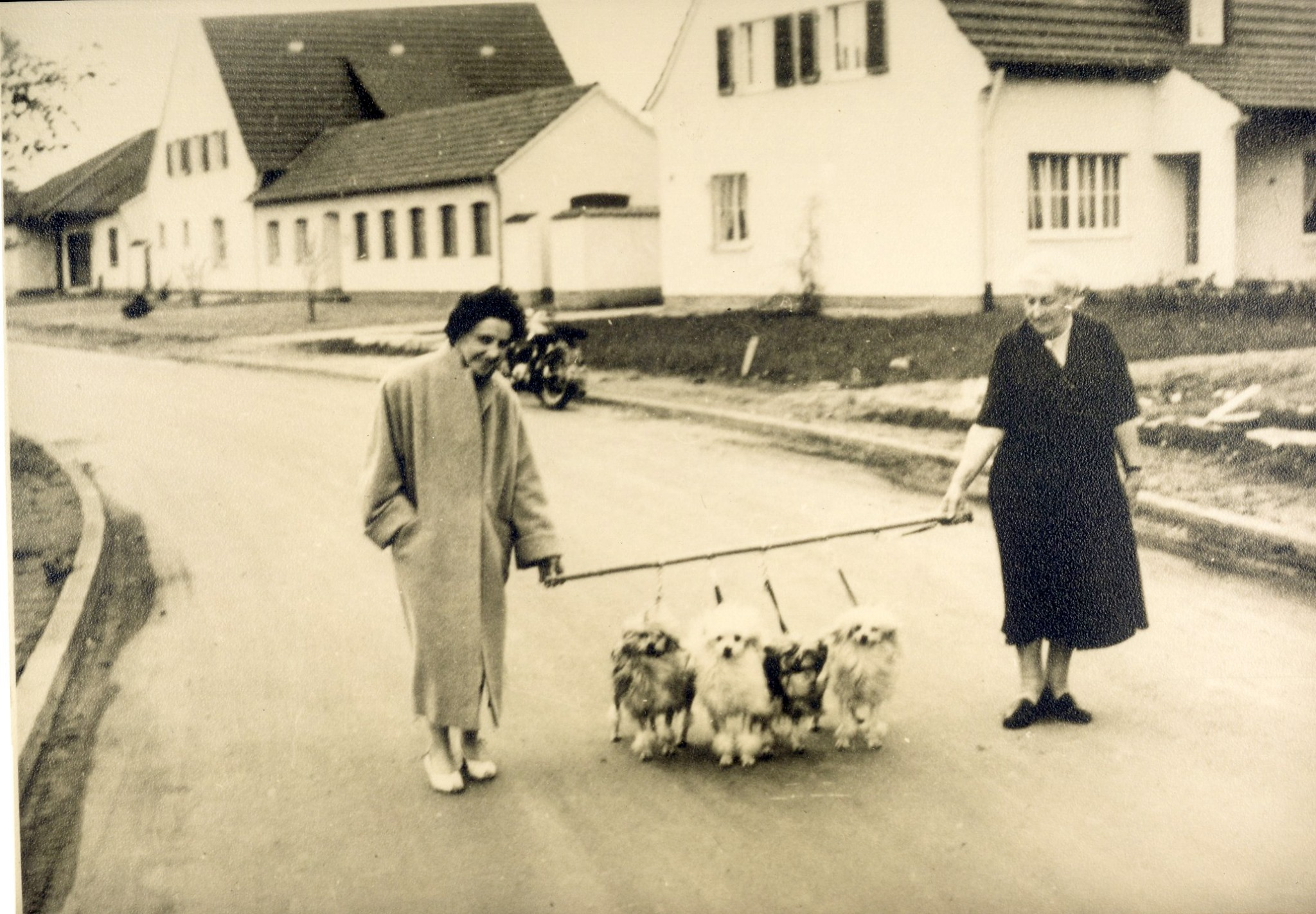
Madame Bennert walking her Lowchens

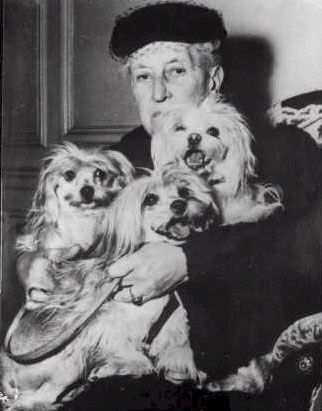
Madame Bennert and her dogs

== See also ==
- List of dog breeds
