= Ortigosa, Portugal =

Ortigosa
- Village
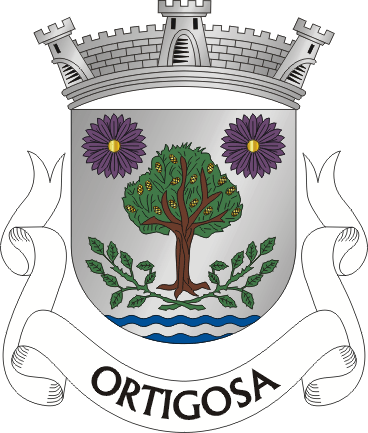
- Coat of arms
- Interactive map of Ortigosa
- Coordinates: 39.82429726319989°N 8.831861009932727°W
- Country: Portugal
- Region: Centro
- Municipality: Leiria
- Civil parish: Souto da Carpalhosa e Ortigosa
- Established: 1962
- Disbanded: 2013

Area
  - Total: 12.86 km^{2} (4.97 sq mi)

Population (2011)
  - Total: 1,971
  - Density: 153.3/km^{2} (397/sq mi)
- Demonym: Ortigosense
- Time zone: UTC+0 (WET)
  - Summer (DST): UTC+1 (WEST)

Ortigosa is a Portuguese village and former civil parish located in the municipality of Leiria, with an area of 12.86 km^{2} (4.97 sq mi) and 1971 inhabitants in 2011. In 2013 the parish merged into the new parish Souto da Carpalhosa e Ortigosa. Its patron is Santo Amaro.

== Population ==
Population of the parish of Ortigosa

Year	Pop.	±%
1970	1,486	—
1981	1,658	+11.6%
1991	1,641	−1.0%

Year	Pop.	±%
2001	1,802	+9.8%
2011	1,971	+9.4%

== Geography ==
Ortigosa is located 14 km (8.7 mi) from the city center of Leiria and 40 km (25 mi) from Figueira da Foz.

== History ==
The parish of Ortigosa was established on October 2, 1962, encompassing nine villages. With an area of around 13 km^{2}, the limits of the parish touched the limits of the villages of Amor, Monte Real, Souto da Carpalhosa, Milagres and Regueira de Pontes. It is believed that most of the places in this village were part of Reguengo do Ulmar, which would mean that until 1291 its fields would have been permanently flooded, which prevented the settlement of populations. That year, D. Dinis ordered the agronomist monks of Alcobaça to dry the wetlands, which became fertile crop fields.

== Places ==
- Mother Church
- Chapel of Mrs. da Vitória
- Mrs. da Paz Chapel
- Fountains of Santo Amaro

Local activities include football, basketball, judo, modelling, mountain biking, futsal, fishing and horse riding.
