= Rafeiro do Alentejo =

Portuguese breed of guardian dog

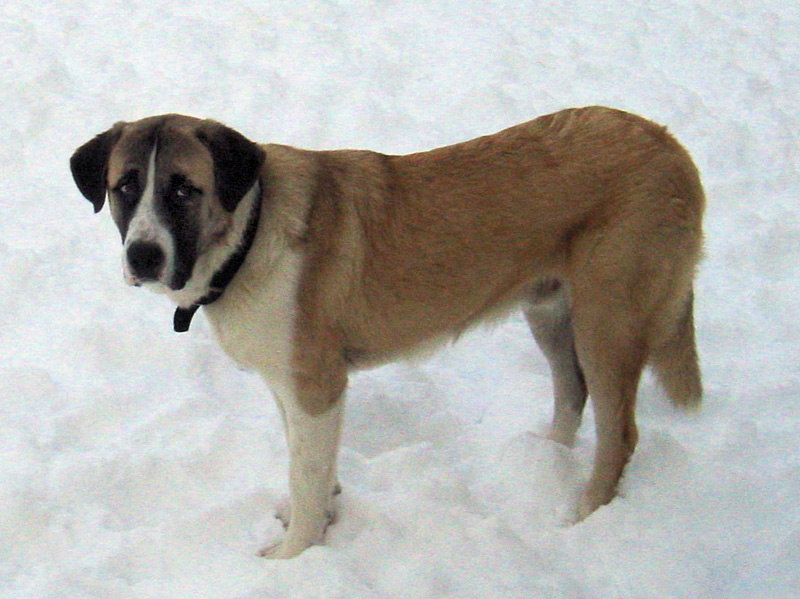
- Other names: Rafeiro of Alentejo
- Origin: Portugal
Traits
Height	Males	66–74 cm (26–29 in)
	Females	64–70 cm (25–28 in)
Weight	Males	45–60 kg (99–132 lb)
	Females	35–50 kg (77–110 lb)
- Coat: short to medium-length; straight, thick, dense
- Colour: yellow, fawn, brindle, wolf grey or black - always with white markings
Kennel club standards
- Clube Português de Canicultura: standard
- Fédération Cynologique Internationale: standard

The Rafeiro do Alentejo (Note: Portuguese pronunciation: [ʁɐˈfɐj.ɾu ðu ɐ.lẽˈtɛ.ʒu]) or Rafeiro Alentejano is a Portuguese breed of flock guardian dog. It is named for its area of origin, the Alentejo region of southern Portugal. It is recognised by the Clube Português de Canicultura, and was definitively accepted by the Fédération Cynologique Internationale in 1954.

== History ==
The Rafeiro is a traditional flock guardian dog of the Alentejo region of southern Portugal. Dogs of this type were used to protect flocks during the biannual transhumance to high summer pastures in the mountains, and then back to the lowlands for the winter. In the late nineteenth century they began to be known as Rafeiro do Alentejo. The earliest breed standard dates from 1953; the breed was definitively accepted by the Fédération Cynologique Internationale in the following year.

Among the marked economic and social changes in Portugal in the 1970s was the large-scale movement of people from rural areas to towns and cities, one consequence of which was an abrupt and significant decrease in pastoral farming. Flock guardian dogs were no longer needed, and numbers of the Rafeiro fell sharply, to the point that by the early 1980s it was close to extinction, with only a few dogs remaining in the hands of a small group of breeders.

A breed club, the Associação dos Criadores do Rafeiro do Alentejo, was established in 1994 in Monforte, in the District of Portalegre; it was a successor to an earlier club, the Clube Português do Rafeiro do Alentejo.. The society and the câmara municipal of Monforte jointly established a breeding centre for the dogs, the Centro de Reprodução do Rafeiro do Alentejo, in the town.

In 2006 there were 1165 bitches registered in the stud-book. The area of distribution of the Rafeiro corresponds closely with the historic region of Alentejo, with the exception of areas closest to the Atlantic coast.

A dog of this breed named Bobi was confirmed by Guinness World Records to be both the oldest living dog and the oldest dog ever, with a claimed age of 30 years and 226 days on 1 February 2023. He died at the claimed age of 31 years and 165 days on 21 October 2023. Doubts about the claims were expressed by veterinary surgeons, and Guinness opened an investigation; it found insufficient evidence of the age of the dog, and the records were annulled.

== Characteristics ==
The Rafeiro is a large dog, slightly longer than it is tall, with a broad chest. The head is massive; the eyes are small and dark, the ears small, triangular and hanging. The coat is dense and straight, of short or medium length. It may be black, fawn, wolf grey or yellow, either brindled or not, but always with white markings; or may be white marked with these colours. It is not as thick as the coat of other pastoral dogs such as the Polish Tatra.

== Use ==
The traditional use of the Rafeiro was as a flock guardian dog, used to protect extensively-managed flocks from predators. It was also used in hunting for large game; historic photographs show that it was among the dogs in the hunting packs of Carlos I, who had a palace in Alentejo. In the twenty-first century the dogs are used to guard farms and other property as well as flocks, and are also kept as companion animals.
