= Sporting Lucas Terrier =

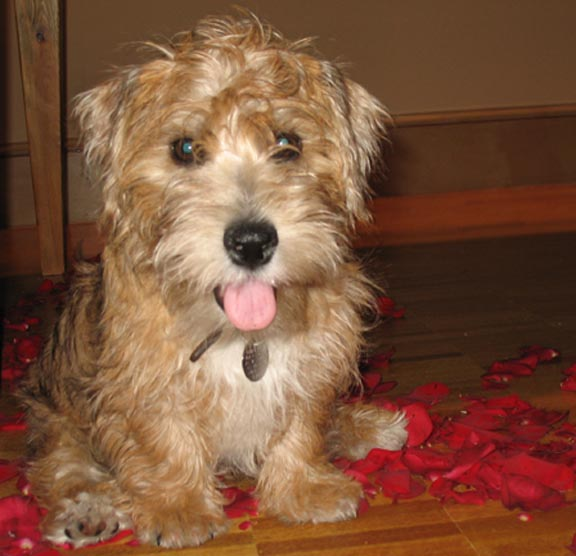
- A Lucas Terrier
- Origin: Scotland

The Sporting Lucas Terrier is a small breed of dog of the terrier type. The breed is named for Jocelyn Lucas.

== Appearance ==
A short-legged working terrier that must be small and narrow enough in the chest to go to ground when required. About twelve inches at the withers, and about 15 lbs. in weight. The harsh shaggy coat is white with dark patches, or various combinations of brown, black and tan or grizzle and tan.

== History ==
The Sporting Lucas Terrier was developed in Scotland (firstly in Mey, Caithness and later in Abington, South Lanarkshire) from the Lucas Terrier, the Jack Russell Terrier, and various Fell Terriers by Brian Plummer in the 1990s, in an effort to create a good working terrier. In 1999 the Lucas Terrier Club de-listed all of Brian Plummer's dogs as they "did not want infusions of other terrier types introduced into their bloodlines". Breed clubs were then set up for Plummer's dog, and it became the Sporting Lucas Terrier, despite the fact that the connection to the original Lucas terrier is tenuous.

The Lucas Terrier was created by Major Jocelyn Lucas in the late 1940s, in an effort to breed a Sealyham Terrier that could go to ground, from Sealyhams and Norfolk Terriers. With more than 500 individuals in the UK, it is primarily a pet in that country. However, in the United States there is a concerted effort to return the Lucas Terrier to the small, workmanlike dog of its origin, and it is increasingly found at sporting trials.

Another breed of terrier developed by Brian Plummer is the Plummer Terrier. It is similar, but bull terrier was also used, and the dog developed a reputation for quarrelsomeness.

== Recognition ==
Of the major kennel clubs in the English-speaking world, only the United Kennel Club (US) recognises the Sporting Lucas Terrier, in their Terrier Group. It may also be recognised by any of the very large number of specialty dog clubs, dog sports clubs, minor registries, and internet based breed registry businesses.

== See also ==
- List of dog breeds
- Terrier
