= Lucas Terrier =

Lucas Terriers
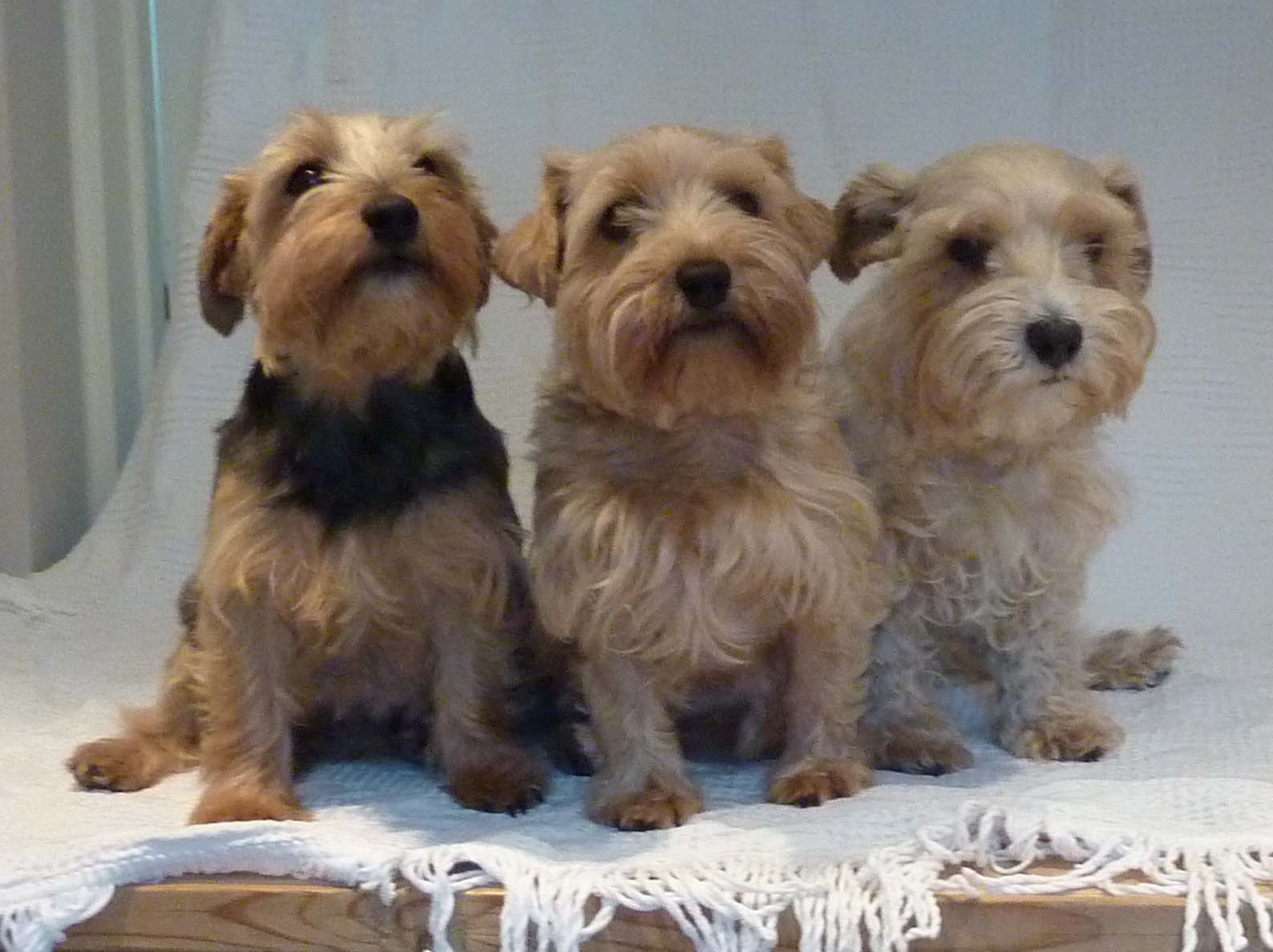
- Typical Lucas Terriers
- Origin: England
Traits
- Coat: Fairly harsh, double, medium length
- Colour: Tan or combinations of tan, white, black, or badger

The Lucas Terrier is a small breed of dog of the terrier type which originated in England in the late 1940s. The breed was created by Sir Jocelyn Lucas at his Ilmer Kennels in Watford, Hertfordshire. All living authentic examples can trace their ancestry back to a small number of his original Ilmer Sealyham dogs, and resulting Lucas Terrier progeny.

== History ==
Sir Jocelyn Lucas, 4th Baronet, a well-known huntsman and Sealyham Terrier breeder in the first half of the 20th century, was disappointed with the direction the Sealyham Terrier was headed since its appearance in conformation shows, especially large heads and heavy shoulders. At his Ilmer kennels in Hertfordshire, he decided to cross one of his own Sealyhams, considerably smaller than the mainstream Sealyham bitches found in show rings at the time, with Norfolk Terrier dogs.

Lucas' kennels were managed by Enid Plummer, who continued the Ilmer programs as he became less involved in the 1950s. Jocelyn died in 1980, and Plummer moved to Cornwall with some of the remaining dogs in the late 1970s, where she continued the breeding program until she died in 1986.

Jumbo Frost took on the task of managing the breed effort from Plummer, and succeeded in expanding the breed with her dedication and foresight, until her own passing in 2009. During that time she oversaw a transformation in the fortunes of the breed, by setting the breed type, formalizing the breed standard, and establishing the Lucas Terrier Club (UK).

== Appearance and temperament ==
The Lucas Terrier is a sturdy, symmetrically built, working animal, like an old-fashioned Ilmer Sealyham type, created principally by breeding a Lucas Terrier from the original lines either to another Lucas Terrier. Early in the breeding program, registered Norfolk Terrier, or small (under 20 lbs. or 9 kilos) Sealyham Terriers were used in breeding programs, to increase working ability, decrease size, improve coats and general health and further set the type. A present-day Norfolk Terrier bred to a contemporary Sealyham Terrier not descended from the Ilmer Kennels will not produce a Lucas Terrier, as all authentic Lucas Terriers must descend from Sir Jocelyn Lucas' original Ilmer terrier lines.

Lucas Terriers possess even temperaments and have been bred for companionship, although there are an increasing number of working Lucases to be found around the world. The standard states that they be friendly, without aggressive tendencies, and not fearful or nervous, while retaining the usual terrier traits. Pale-shaded or white examples are frequently mistaken for Sealyham Terriers, although their size (typically 11-17 lbs.), demonstrate their heredity from Sir Jocelyn's "miniature" Sealyhams of the early 20th century.

== Original club ==
The Lucas Terrier Club (LTC) is a private British organization developed for the purposes of preserving and promoting the Lucas Terrier, and to offer assistance to breeders in sourcing registered Lucas Terriers or dogs of parent breeds for the continuance of the breed. The Club holds and maintains a register of more than 700 past and present Lucas Terriers around the world.

== Lucas Terrier in the U.S. ==
The Lucas Terrier Club of America (LTCA) was established in 2006. A separate, American Lucas Terrier Society, formed in 2012, later merged with the LTCA. In January 2020 the LTCA formally ceased operations. Today, stewardship for the breed is now managed by the United Lucas Terrier Association (ULTA), a nonprofit organization formed in late 2019, which works closely with the English Lucas Terrier Club to ensure the future of the breed.

== Sporting Lucas Terrier ==
Both the traditional Lucas and Sporting Lucas Terrier share primary origin breeds: the Sealyham and Norfolk Terrier. The Sporting Lucas Terrier permits the inclusion of other breeds in matings, most commonly, the Jack Russell Terrier. In 1999 a breakaway club, known as the Sporting Lucas Terrier Club, was formed. In 2003, a separate Sporting Lucas Terrier Association was also formed in the United Kingdom.

== See also ==
- List of dog breeds
