= Sealyham Terrier =

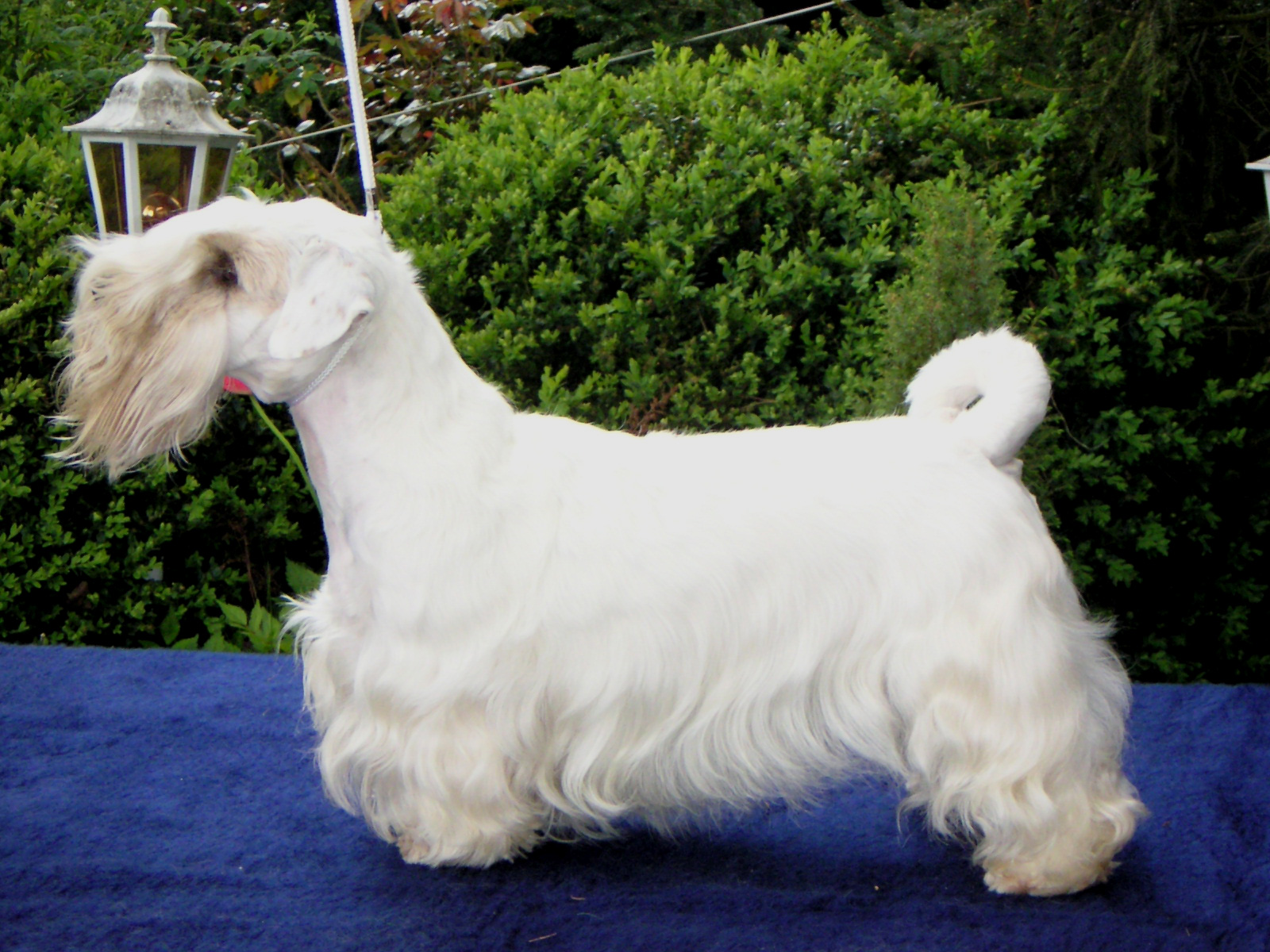
- A Sealyham Terrier
- Other names: Welsh Border Terrier, Cowley Terrier
- Origin: Wales
Traits
- Height: 12 inches (30 cm)
Weight	Males	9 kilograms (20 lb)
	Females	8 kilograms (18 lb)
- Coat: Double
- Colour: White
Kennel club standards
- The Kennel Club: standard
- Fédération Cynologique Internationale: standard

The Sealyham Terrier (Welsh: Daeargi Sealyham) is a rare Welsh breed of small to medium-sized terrier that originated in Wales as a working dog. It is principally a white-bodied, rough-coated breed, developed in the mid-to-late-19th century by Captain John Edwardes at Sealyham House, Pembrokeshire.

Following the First World War, it surged in popularity and was associated with Hollywood stars and members of the British royal family. Its numbers have dropped significantly since then, with the breed listed as a Vulnerable Native Breed by the Kennel Club; an all-time low was recorded in 2008 when only 43 puppies were registered in the United Kingdom. This decline has been blamed on an influx of foreign and designer breeds, and the Sealyham's reduced usefulness as a working dog.

This breed is equally suitable as a family dog or a working terrier, given the right training. It is affected by few breed specific breed disorders, with the only two prevalent conditions being lens luxation and canine degenerative myelopathy. A DNA test is now readily available to identify dogs who carry the gene that causes lens luxation and breeding programmes can be adjusted.

== History ==
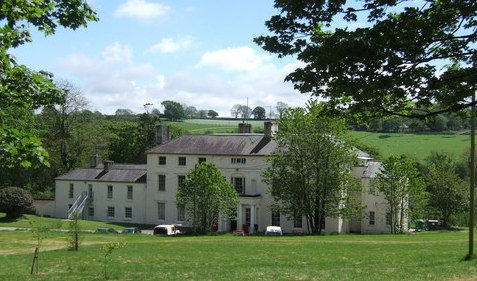
Sealyham House, where Captain John Edwardes originally developed the Sealyham Terrier

The breed was developed between 1850 and 1891 by Captain John Edwardes, at Sealyham House, near Wolfscastle in the Welsh county of Pembrokeshire. Originally the breed was used for pest control, to hunt small game, and to eliminate vermin, particularly badgers. The Welsh Corgi, Fox Terrier (Wire), and the now extinct English White Terrier all played a part in the make up of the Sealyham, although Edwardes did not keep records. He wanted a small white dog with a strong jaw, and a wiry coat. The white coat was particularly prized, as it meant that the hunter in the field could distinguish the dogs from the quarry. Edwardes culled weak dogs, and bred the stronger ones. After Edwardes' death in 1891, other breeders began to work with Sealyhams, including Fred Lewis, who promoted the breed.

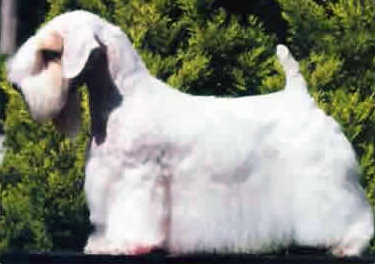
A modern, groomed show dog.

The breed was shown for the first time in 1903, and the Sealyham Terrier club was created in 1908; the breed was officially recognised by the Kennel Club in 1911. The Sealyham Terrier now is recognised by all of the major kennel clubs in the English-speaking world. During the early stages of its recognition, the breed was alternatively known as the Welsh Border Terrier, or the Cowley Terrier. The American Sealyham Terrier Club was founded in 1913.

During the 1920s and 1930s, Sir Jocelyn Lucas used the dogs to hunt badgers which he usually relocated. At this time he also used Sealyham Terriers for hunting otters, stoats and squirrels. Deciding that he wanted a better hunting dog than the Sealyhams, bred for conformation showing, he cross-bred the dogs with the Norfolk Terrier. This resulted in an unrecognised breed of dog he called the Lucas Terrier, which he described as "death to rats and rabbits".

The Sealyham surged in popularity after the First World War in the UK and the United States. Within the Hollywood film industry, the Sealyham became a fashionable dog to own by the Hollywood elite. The terrier was owned by actors Tallulah Bankhead, Humphrey Bogart, Bette Davis, Elizabeth Taylor, and by writer Agatha Christie. Cary Grant owned one which he named Archie Leach – Grant's real name. Alfred Hitchcock had one of his Sealyham Terriers seen in his 1941 film Suspicion. Alfred Hitchcock can also be seen at the start of his 1963 film, The Birds, walking two of his Sealyham Terriers in a cameo appearance, although he also owned a third Sealyham not featured in the movie. The British royal family also favoured these dogs; King George V owned a dog named Jack. In 1959 one Sunday newspaper reported in the UK: "A notice has been posted in Clarence House and Windsor Castle giving explicit instructions that when Princess Margaret has breakfast in bed, her two Sealyhams must be brought to the room along with her breakfast tray." These two dogs were called Pippin and Johnny, and were looked after by the Queen Mother when Princess Margaret fell ill. In the 1960s, children's author Maurice Sendak owned a Sealyham named Jennie, which he featured in his 1967 work Higglety Pigglety Pop!.

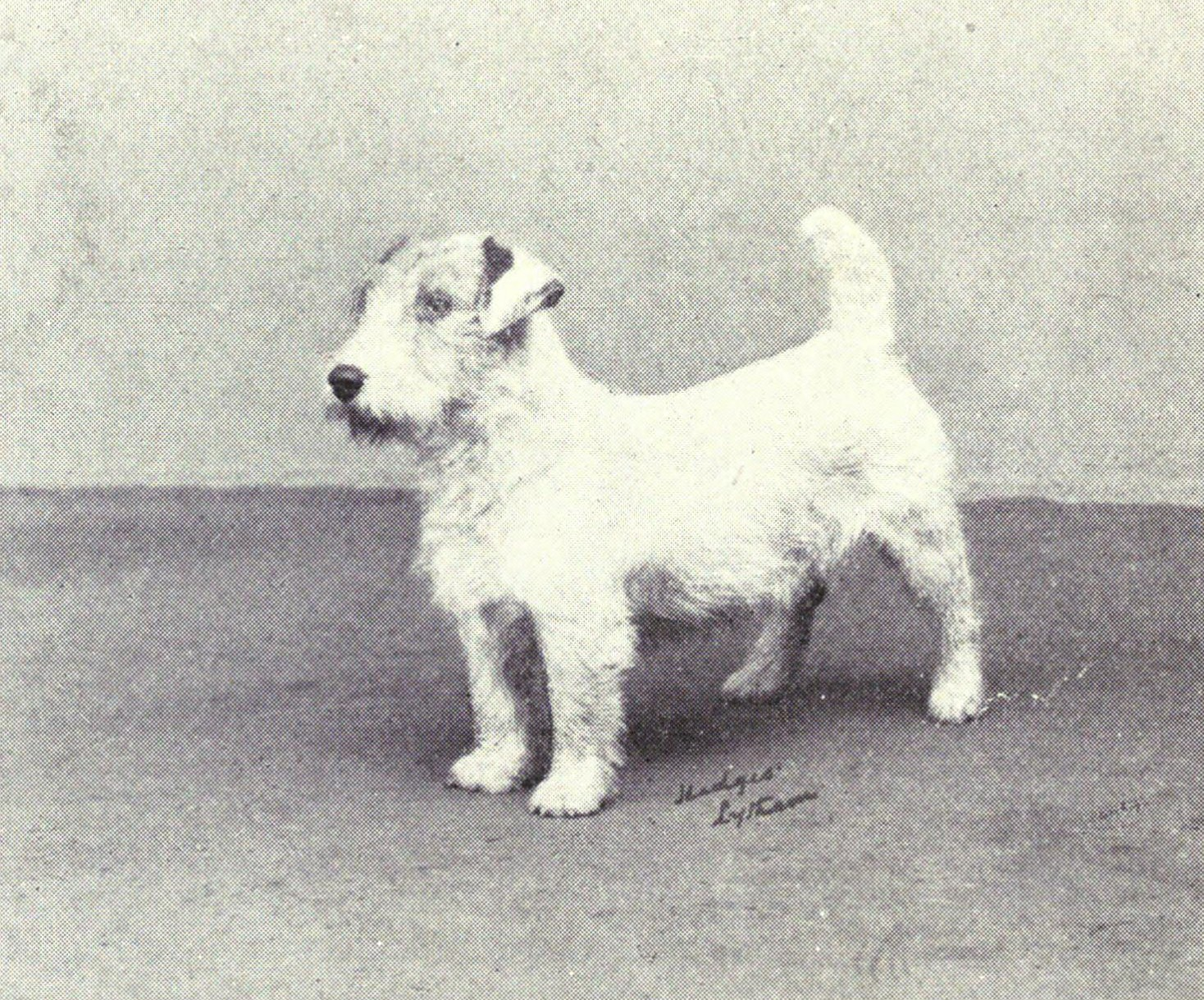
A Sealyham Terrier photographed in 1915

The Sealyham was once one of the more popular terriers, and one of the best known Welsh breeds. Today, however, the Kennel Club (UK) lists the Sealyham as amongst the most endangered native breeds. In 2008, registrations of new puppies with the Kennel Club dropped to an all-time low of 43, placing it among the bottom three on the list of Vulnerable Native Breeds. In October 2011, British magazine Country Life highlighted the breed on its front cover, with the heading "SOS: Save our Sealyhams", and launched a campaign to save the breed. End of year figures for 2011 showed that 49 puppies were registered with the Kennel Club in the UK, keeping them within the bottom three on the list of most endangered breeds.

Another notable Sealyham Terrier, Ch. Efbe's Hidalgo At Goodspice, also known as Charmin, won Best In Show at Crufts in 2009, but his victory was not televised as the BBC had dropped the coverage of the competition earlier that year, following the controversy after the channel showed the documentary Pedigree Dogs Exposed. He had previous won the AKC/Eukanuba National Championship in the United States in 2007, and the World Dog Show in 2008. While in retirement, Charmin attended many shows as a spectator until he died in October, 2018.

Harry Parsons, founder of the Working Sealyham Terrier Club, has stated that, "To sustain a breed...you need between 300 to 500 puppies a year". The Kennel Club has blamed the decline of the breed on the availability of designer dogs and newer breeds such as the Shih Tzu, and the banning of tail docking which has reduced their ability as working dogs. Paul Keevil, formerly of the Kennel Club's vulnerable breeds committee explains: "Traditionally, soon after Sealyhams were born, their tails were docked by half their length, because they were small working dogs and they quite often got stuck down holes, meaning that they required short, strong tails for the owner to be able to pull them out." As of 2010, the breed is ranked 152nd out of 168 breeds according to registrations by the American Kennel Club. By 2017, the breed ranked 150 out of 190 breeds registered by the American Kennel Club. This ranking has dropped to 168th of 202 in 2024. In 2023, a Sealyham Terrier named Stache won the US National Dog Show.

== Appearance ==
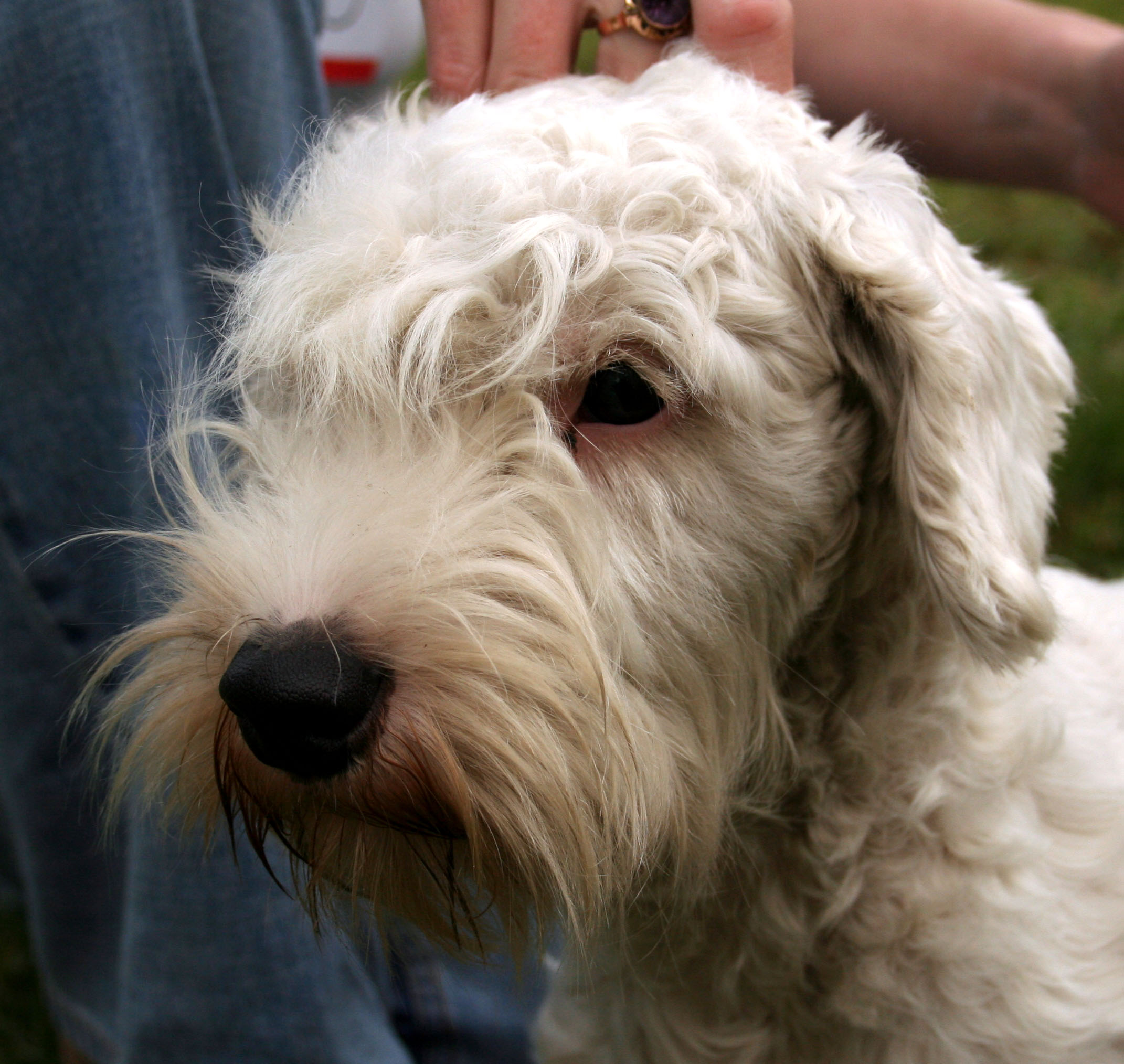
A close-up of the face of a Sealyham Terrier

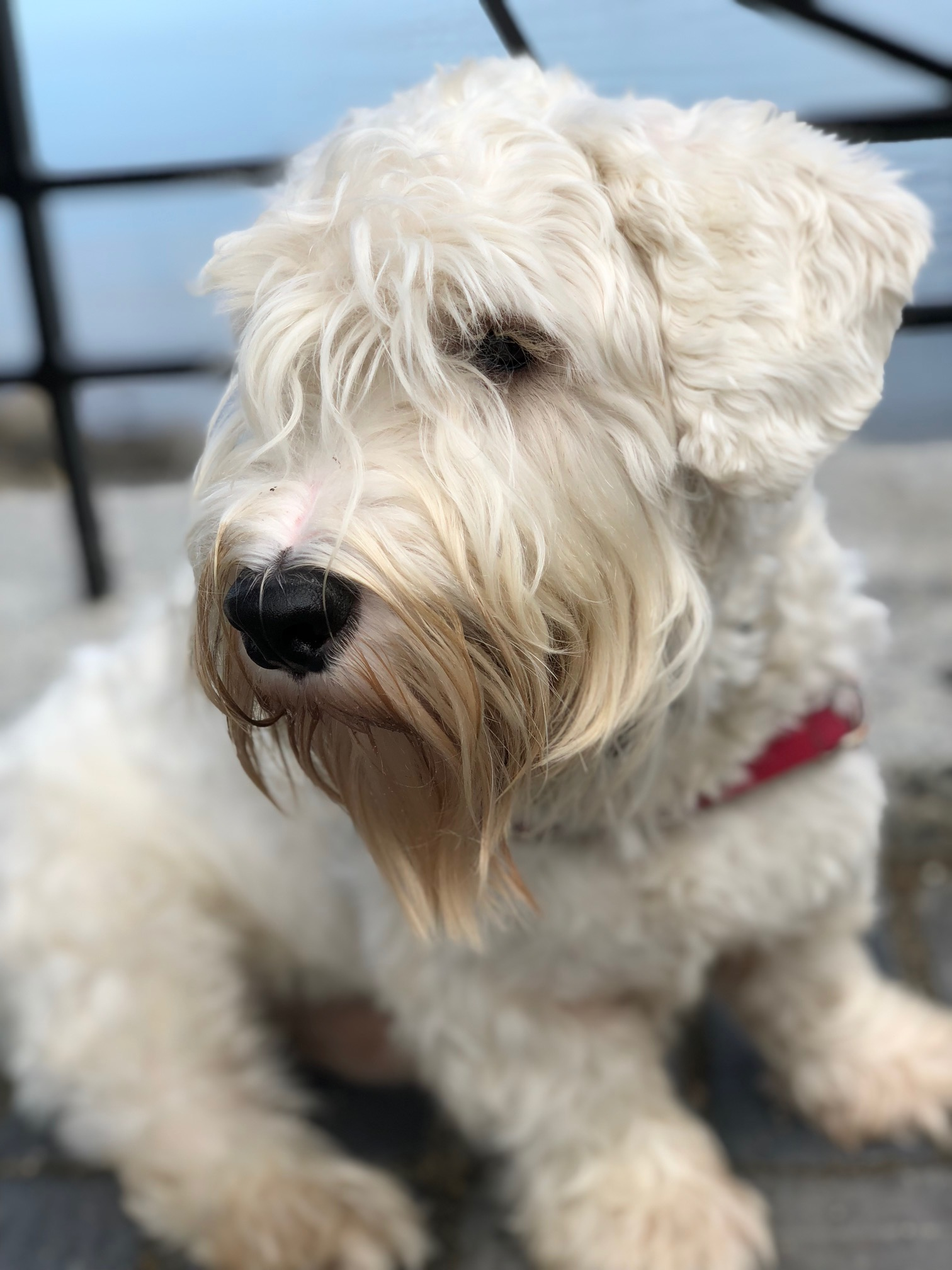
An adult Sealyham Terrier (not in show trim)

Sealyhams measurements vary by breed standard according to particular countries. The Kennel Club breed standard states the height of a Sealyham Terrier should not exceed 31 centimetres (12 in), measured at the withers or at the top of the shoulder blade. The American Kennel Club (AKC) standard states height to be "about" 10.5 inches at the withers. Weight for a Sealyham is also slightly different. The Kennel Club stating 8 kilograms (18 lb) for females, or 9 kilograms (20 lb) for males, with the AKC standard "23 - 24 lbs for dogs; bitches slightly less."

They have a white double coat which requires regular brushing with a wire comb in order to prevent matting. It has a dense undercoat, while the outer coat is wiry and weather resistant. Markings on the face can be in a variety of colours including lemon, black, brown, blue, and badger, which is a mix of brown and black. Heavy body markings or patches or excessive ticking on the coat are discouraged. Sealyhams are low to the ground, and in muddy weather their long coats can become quite dirty. Sealyham coats are groomed by hand stripping, in order to keep the coat from becoming too soft. However, if they are not shown, Sealyhams can be clipped and this is often the preferred grooming approach for pets. As with many terriers, Sealyhams have essentially non-shedding coats.

== Temperament ==
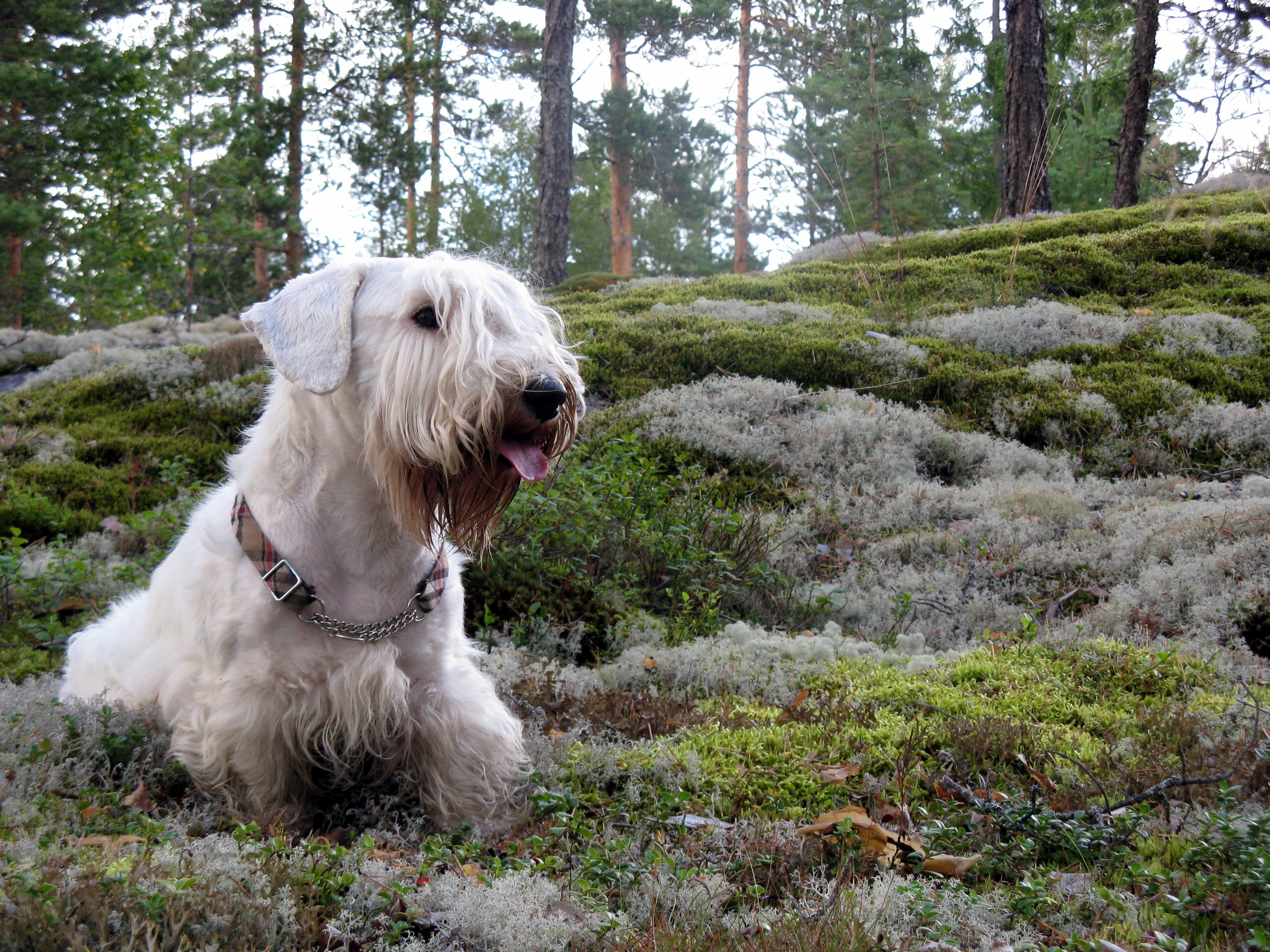
A Sealyham Terrier in the woods

Although happy in the company of others, they are fine if left alone. Sealyham Terriers are suited for both the town and country. They can be strong willed, and in some cases, immensely vocal, and boisterous but also full of personality and affectionate. While they make for loyal family companions, they can be trained to be working dogs, making them excellent mousers or ratters. They can also be taught as puppies to get along with other animals, including cats and birds.

Harry Parsons described his Sealyhams thus: "They make great companions, and the way they bond with their owners is almost magical. I keep six indoors, and if someone rings about an infestation and asks us to go ratting, they will know and are out of the door in a millisecond. If you train them, they'll retrieve. They'll do anything to please you."

== Health ==
A 2024 UK study found a life expectancy of 13.1 years for the breed compared to an average of 12.7 for purebreeds and 12 for crossbreeds.

The Sealyham Terrier is one of the more commonly affected breeds for primary lens luxation which is caused by an autosomal recessive mutation of the ADAMTS17 gene.

This in turn blocks the flow of fluids in the eye, leading to a painful increase in intra-ocular pressure (glaucoma) and often irreparable optic nerve damage, leading to visual field loss and eventual blindness.

As of November 2011, the Kennel Club has not highlighted any specific concerns regarding the breed's health to conformation show judges. Due to the low numbers of the breed, two of the most prevalent problems facing the breed today is the popular sire effect and the general problem of genetic diversity within the breed.

The breed is predisposed to atopic dermatitis.
