= Norwich Terrier =

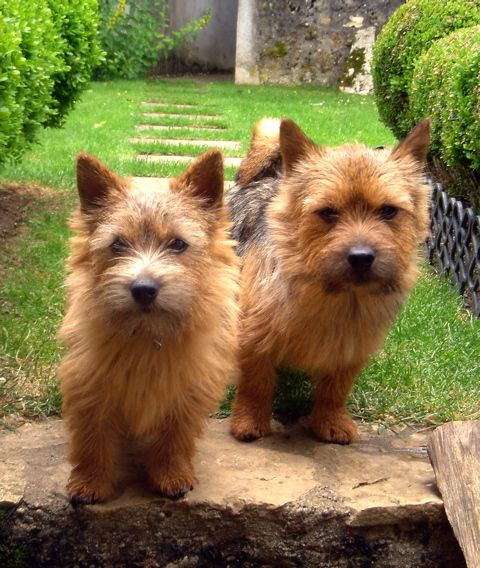
- Red (left) and Black & Tan (right) Norwich Terriers
- Origin: East Anglia, England
Traits
- Height: 24–25.5 cm (9.4–10.0 in)
- Weight: 5.0–5.5 kg (11.0–12.1 lb)
- Coat: Double Coat (Hard wiry & soft under coat)
- Colour: Red, Black and Tan, Wheaten, Grizzle
- Litter size: 1-3
Kennel club standards
- The Kennel Club: standard
- Fédération Cynologique Internationale: standard

The Norwich Terrier is a breed of dog originating in England, and was bred to hunt small rodents. One of the smallest terriers, these dogs are relatively rare. Their drop-eared variety is the Norfolk Terrier.

== Description ==
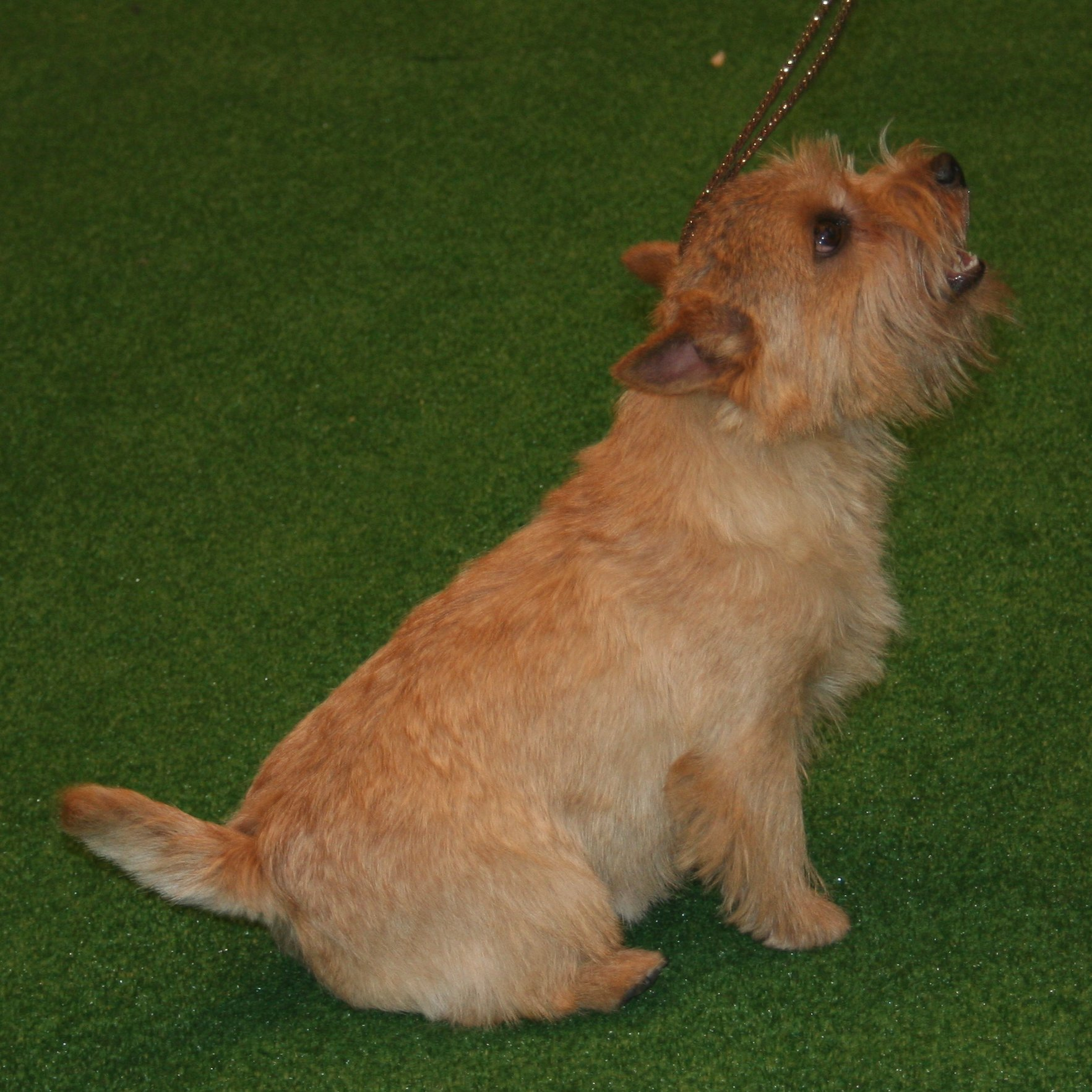
A Norwich Terrier.

=== Appearance ===
These terriers are one of the smallest working terriers weighing approximately 12 pounds (5.4 kg) and ideally not being above 10 inches (25 cm) at the withers, with prick ears and a double coat, which comes in all shades of red, tan, wheaten, black and tan, and grizzle. The skull is broad and slightly rounded with a well defined stop. The muzzle ratio to the head is 2:3. The eyes are small and oval-shaped. Ears are usually erect — but can be laid back when the dog is calm — and set apart with good width between them. The tips are pointed. The back is short with good depth and a well sprung loin. Legs are short with the elbows being more proximal than distal. Tail is of moderate length when not docked, thick at the base with tapering near the top. Tail should be 'carried jauntily' and 'not excessively gay'. The American Kennel Club standard calls for a 'medium docked' tail with enough of the tail being left on so that it can be held or grabbed.

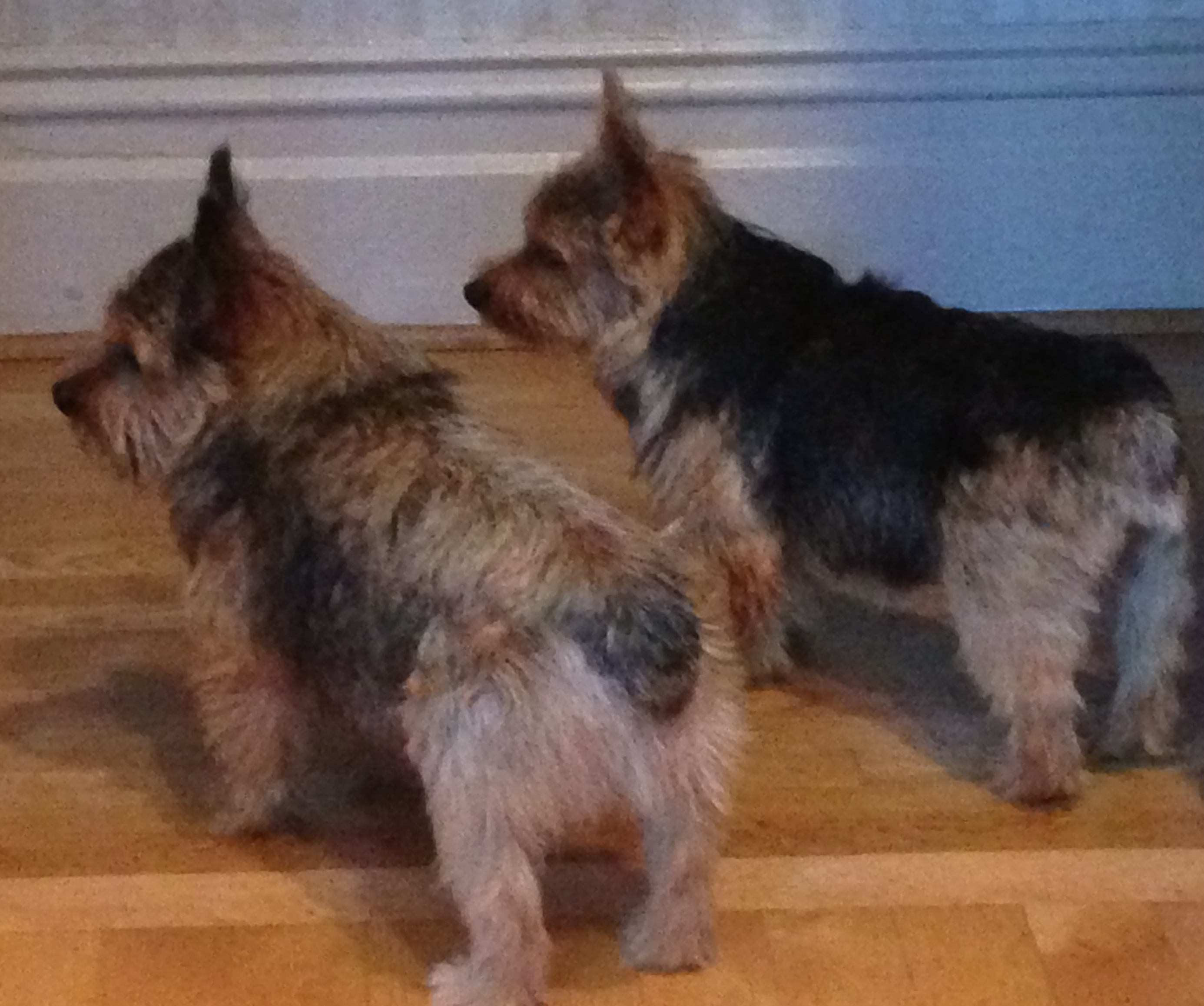
Grizzle and Black and Tan Norwich Terriers

=== Temperament ===
Occasionally, this breed will display barking and digging behaviours, which are reflective of their terrier heritage. Consistent and early training can help manage these habits.

== Health ==
A study in the UK found a life expectancy of 14 years for the Norwich Terrier.

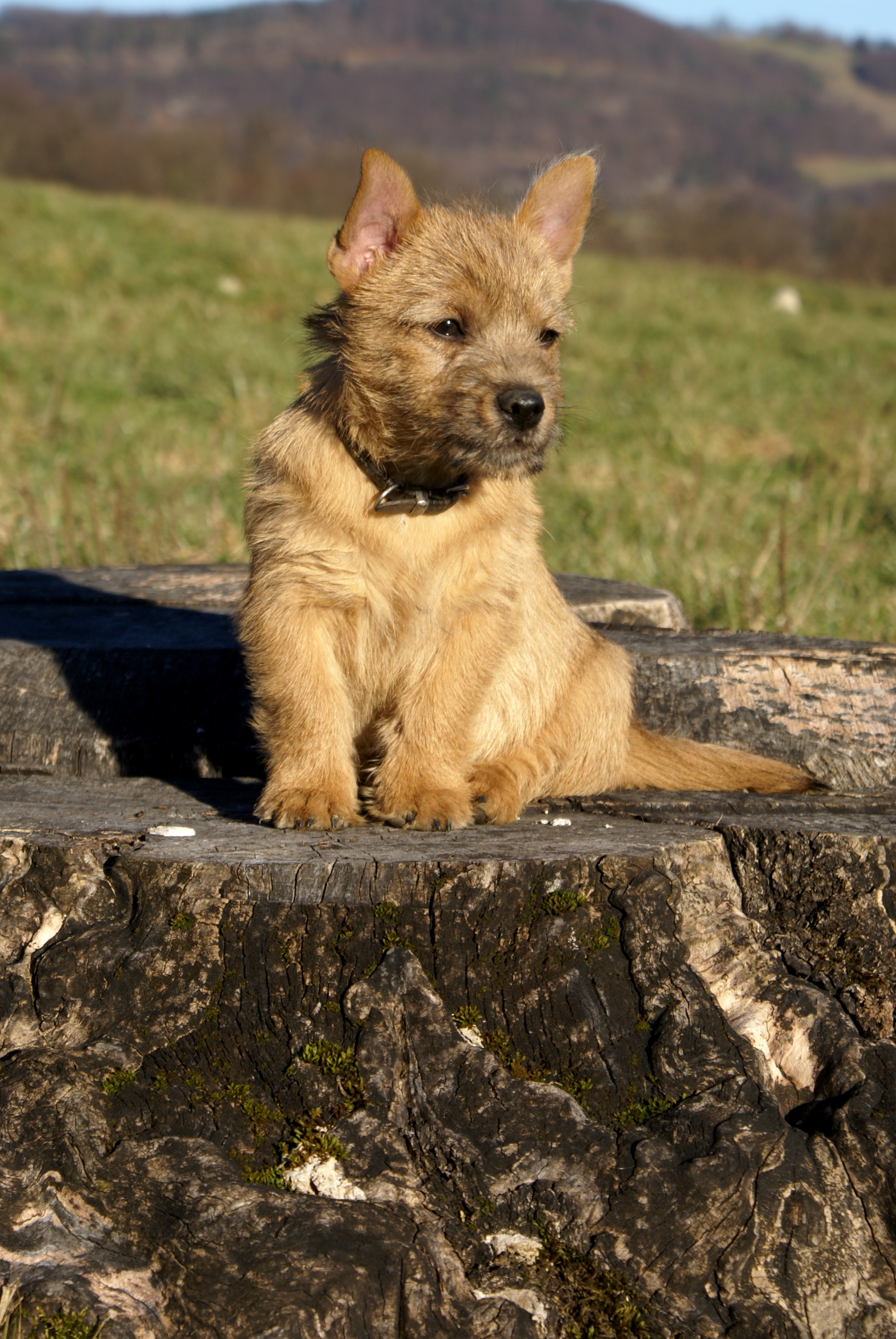
Norwich Terrier puppy

A US study of over 90,000 dogs found the Norwich Terrier to be the second most predisposed breed to portosystemic shunt with 7.41% of dogs being affected compared to 0.35% for mixed-breed dogs.

A retrospective study on cataracts using patient records from North American hospitals found a prevalence of 4.02% for the Norwich Terrier compared to 1.61% for mixed-breed dogs.

=== Breathing issues ===
Some Norwich Terriers suffer from an upper respiratory obstructive syndrome that differs from brachycephalic obstructive airway syndrome. In a study of 12 dogs with signs of the condition 11 had abnormalities of the laryngeal opening with redundant aryepiglottic folds, laryngeal collapse, everted laryngeal saccules, and a narrowed laryngeal opening all being observed in multiple dogs.

A 2019 study found that some Norwich terriers suffering from respiratory tract disorders shared a mutated variant of gene ADAMTS3 that is typically associated with swelling around the airways. Dogs with two copies scored worse on airway-function tests. Breeders hope to employ genetic testing to minimize the mutation being passed down.

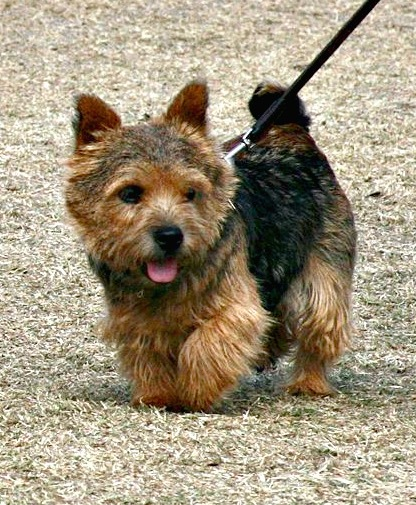
Norwich Terriers can be red, wheaten, black and tan, or grizzle (red and black hairs intermixed).

=== Labour complications ===
A questionnaire identified the Norwich Terrier as requiring more than half of all bitches to undergo caesarean section to give birth. The questionnaire also found more than a fifth of all Norwich Terrier pups to be stillborn. A UK based questionnaire identified a rate of caesarean section of 36.6%.

== Population ==
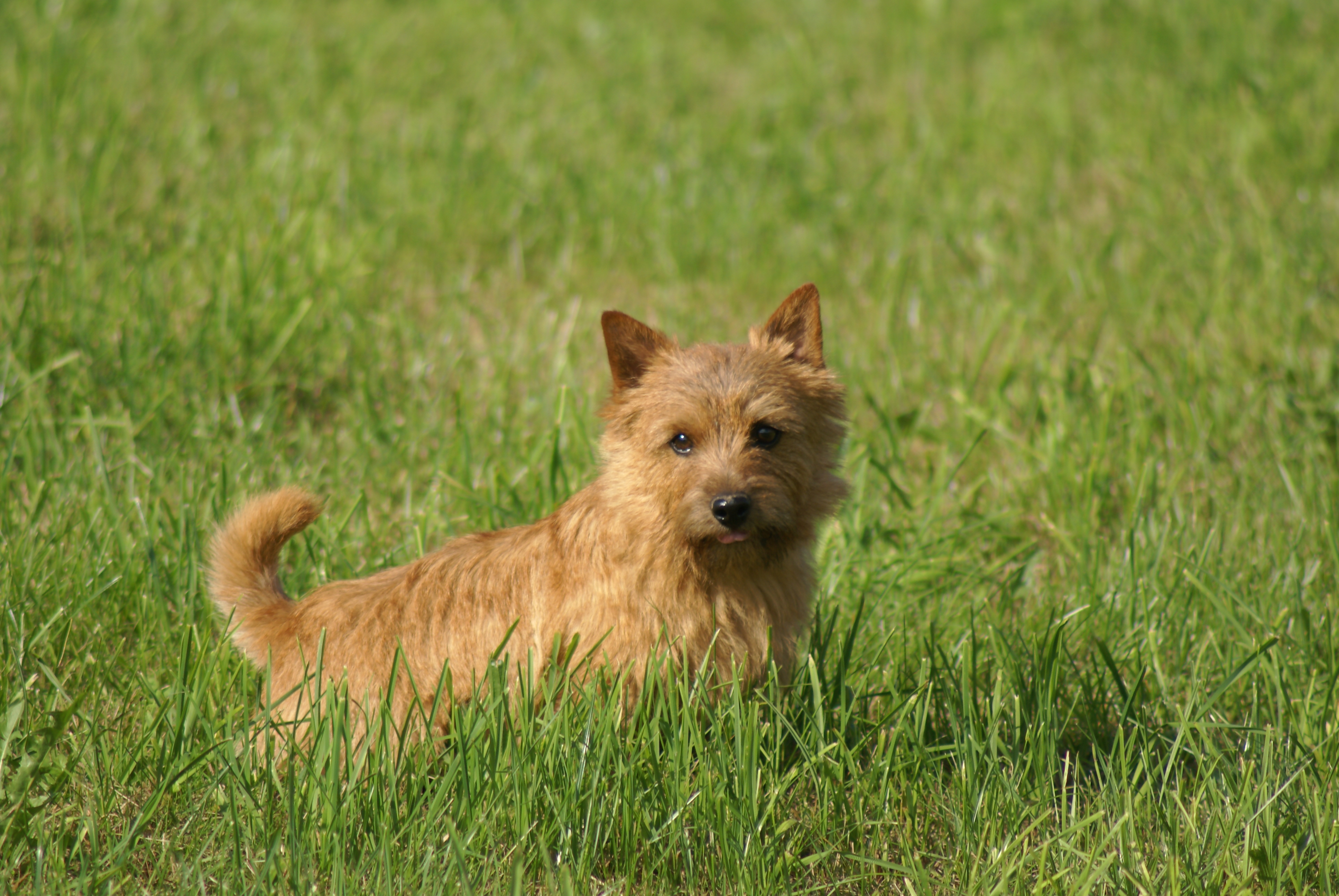
Young Norwich Terrier

In 2018, both Norfolk and Norwich terriers appeared on the Kennel Club's list of most vulnerable dog breeds, with the Norwich breed having fewer than 300 births per year.

== History ==
=== Origin ===
Fox hunting terriers resembling the Norwich have been described since the 19th century.

Two extinct breeds are often suggested as being the ancestor of the Norwich Terrier: the Cantab terrier and the Trumpington terrier.

==== Cantab terrier ====
In the 1880s a dog dealer, Charles Lawrence became well known amongst the undergraduates of Cambridge University. One student wrote of him: 'Everybody knew him, nobody believed him yet his margin of profit must have been considerable...'. Lawrence hailed from nearby Chesterton and bred terriers from Irish Terriers, Yorkshire Terriers, and an East Anglian red terriers (colloquially known as 'gypsy dogs'), he developed a ratter that also made for a good companion for students. These dogs became known as cantab terriers.

==== Trumpington terrier ====
After his graduation from Cambridge in 1889, E. Jodrell Hopkins opened a livery stable on Trumpington Street, he kept and bred terriers here and they became known as Trumpington terriers. These dogs gained popularity in Norwich and Leicestershire before Hopkins moved away to Newmarket. Hopkins started with breeding a dark brindle Aberdeen-type Scottish Terrier bitch he inherited from a war recruit to a cantab terrier that had a longer and harsher red coat. From this paring came a rough-coated dog that was primarily red named Rags and a darker and smaller bitch named Nell. Hopkins kept Nell and sent Rags to J. E. Cooke, master of a pack of staghounds in Norwich. Cooke bred Rags to multiple sporting terriers belonging to different townsfolk and all of the puppies had red coats. Hopkins bred Nell and her dam to a dog he had purchased named Jack, a cropped ear, sandy coated terrier. The offspring from this pairing had either red or grizzle coats.

==== Frank Jones ====
Frank Jones came from County Wicklow and by 1901 was working as the whip in the Norwich staghounds. Jones eventually quit his job and moved to Market Harborough, he brought terriers sired by Rags into the town to work as ratters. He chose to name these terriers after the town he had left. He favoured erect ears, and whole coloured red or black and tan terriers without any white. World War I led to a decrease in his terrier numbers; however Jones kept breeding and by 1930 there was a dedicated breed club trying to achieve recognition with the Kennel Club. Jones did not wish for formal recognition or the idea of a show standard. In 1956 he attended a show and decried the modern Norwich claiming his dogs were no larger than the Yorkshire Terrier and saying he did not care about any so-called 'improvements'. Frank's dogs would be imported to the US in the early 20th century and were known as 'Jones Terrier'

=== Breed recognition ===
In 1932, thanks to the effort of Mrs D. Normandy-Rodwell a group of 13 Norwich Terrier owners formed the first breed club. There was debate within the group about the ideal breed standard and despite it being forbidden by the Kennel Club several members would crop the ears of their terriers who lacked erect ears. Despite the Kennel Club chairman A. Croxton Smith stating that restricting to one ear type would cause difficulties and a breeder known as Colonel Gell saying: 'in this vascillating ear regulation, the Norwich Terrier Club is laying up for itself, trouble in the future.' the president of the Norwich Terrier Club — Jack Read — refused to allow black and tan and drop eared dogs into the draft standard. Normandy-Rodwell who was the secretary believed that the dogs should only be 'brilliantly orange' and that only erect ears should be allowed. Eventually Read conceded and allowed black and tan dogs, although he refused to allow any with white markings. In 1935 Read resigned from his role as president after the first breed standard came out due it to including both black and tan and dropped ears.

=== Breed separation ===
For more than 30 years Marion Sheila Scott Macfie tried to promote the drop-eared variety of the Norwich Terrier as a separate and distinct breed to the Norwich Terrier. She repeatedly took her dogs to shows which grew their popularity and during World War II she sent over two pairs of dogs to the US. As the Norwich began to be shown more and more often Macfie grew to resent the fact that erect eared dogs would win far more often than the drop eared variety. In 1957 she fought to make drop ears be considered equal but the Kennel Club rejected her arguments. Seven years later she achieved separate recognition of the drop eared variety as the Norfolk Terrier.

Both ear types continued to be allowed in the ring until The Kennel Club recognized the drop-eared variety as a separate breed, the Norfolk Terrier, in 1964, and the American Kennel Club, United Kennel Club, and Canadian Kennel Club did the same in 1979. Until that time, the breeds were designated by the AKC as Norwich Terriers, P.E. (prick ears) and Norwich Terriers, D.E. (drop ears).

== See also ==
- List of dog breeds

== Bibliography ==
- Bunting, Marjorie (1997). The Norwich Terrier. Bromma: Mälaröbörsen. ISBN 91-972833-6-3.
- Nicholas, Anna Katherine (1 March 1994). Norwich Terrier. TFH Publications. ISBN 0866225803.
- Peper, Wilfried (1995). Norfolk und Norwich Terrier. Hamburg: Parey. ISBN 3-490-07619-2.
- Sattler, Victor (2009). Comparative Study & Illustrated Breed Standard of Norfolk and Norwich Terriers. Toronto: Wildgoose.
