= Treffgarne Hall =

Country house in Pembrokeshire, Wales

Coordinates: 51.8724°N 4.9761°W

Treffgarne Hall is a privately owned Grade II listed Georgian country house, located to the west of the village of Treffgarne, West Wales. It was built in 1842 for David Evans whose family had owned the land for some time.

== History ==
Set on a hillside to provide panoramic views to the southwest over Pembrokeshire, the S-shaped building was erected in 1824 for Dr. Evans. Built out of stone with two storeys, the two hipped end panels frame a flat central-door entrance on the three-panel house. The main door opens to an axial passage which passes numerous living room doors to the large rear kitchen, also enabling access to both main and servants staircases. Considerable alterations were made to the interior in the twentieth century when the house was used as a hotel. The layout resembles that of Scolton Manor which was also designed by local architects William and James Owen.

In 1905 the estate was bought by Victor James Higgon, whose wife Catherine Octavia Edwards was the last of the Tucker family to live at Sealyham House.

== Modern times ==
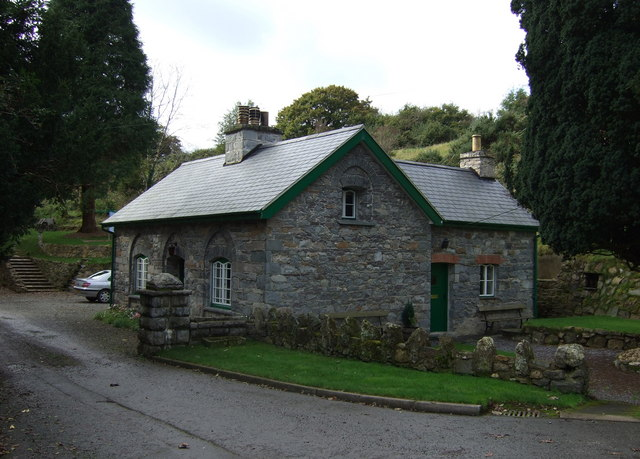
The Grade II listed entrance lodge

The Hall and the associated entrance lodge both became Grade II listed buildings in January 1963. The Hall was for a time converted into a hotel and restaurant in 1979 by executive chef, Derek Stenson and his partner John Neville, the former sous chef at the Dorchester Hotel.

Now privately owned, the 4 acres (1.6 ha) gardens are often opened to the public under the National Gardens Scheme, with entrance and tea and cake available for a fee donated to charity. Set on a hilltop, the garden offers extensive views and features lawns, broadwalks, pergolas, sculptures, water garden, wild flower meadow, heather garden, gravel garden and stumpery. The owners are interested in experimenting and finding out what plants will thrive in Pembrokeshire.
