= Thomas Nicholas (antiquary) =

Welsh educationist and antiquary

- Born: 17 February 1816; Trefgarn, Pembrokeshire
- Died: 14 May 1879 (aged 63); London
- Burial place: Hammersmith Cemetery; 51.48889°N 0.21536°W
- Occupations: Antiquary and educator

Thomas Nicholas (17 February 1816 (Note: The 1894 DNB gives his birth year as 1820. The DWB gives it as 1816. It is more recent and is more precise, and therefore seems more likely to be right.) – 14 May 1879) was a Welsh antiquary and educator.

== Biography ==
Nicholas was born in a small thatched house near Trefgarn chapel, not far from Solva, Pembrokeshire. He was educated at Lancashire College, Manchester, and at Göttingen in Germany, where he took the degree of PhD. He became a Presbyterian minister, and served at Stroud, Gloucestershire and at Eignbrook, Herefordshire. In 1856, he was appointed professor of biblical literature and mental and moral science at the Presbyterian College at Carmarthen. In 1863 he settled in London, resigning his professorship, and thenceforth, with the aid of Sir Hugh Owen, Lord Aberdare, Archdeacon Griffiths, Rev. David Thomas (editor of the Homilist), and others, he promoted a scheme for the furtherance of higher education in Wales on non-sectarian principles, and became the secretary of the movement. He subsequently disagreed with others of the promoters, and had resigned from the committee before the scheme came to fruition. As a result of these efforts, the University College of Wales was founded in 1872, when a building at Aberystwyth was purchased. Nicholas is said to have secured promises of subscriptions amounting to £14,000. He was one of the governors and drew out a scheme of education. He had made a special study of the educational institutions of France and Germany. He died unmarried at 156 Cromwell Road, London, on 14 May 1879.

== Writings ==
Besides pamphlets and other publications, Nicholas was the author of:

- Middle and High Class Schools, and University Education for Wales, 1863, a work which exerted great influence on educated Welshmen.
- Pedigree of the English People, 1868; 5th edit. 1878.
- Annals and Antiquities of the Counties and County Families of Wales, 1872, in 2 vols.
- History and Antiquities of the County of Glamorgan and its Families, 1874.
- He edited, with notes and a biographical sketch, Mathias Maurice's Social Religion Exemplify'd, 1860, 8vo.
- In late 1878, he revised the English edition of Baedeker's London as it passed through the press.
- He projected a History of Wales, which he did not live to complete.
