= Sealyham House =

Country house in Pembrokeshire, Wales

Sealyham Mansion
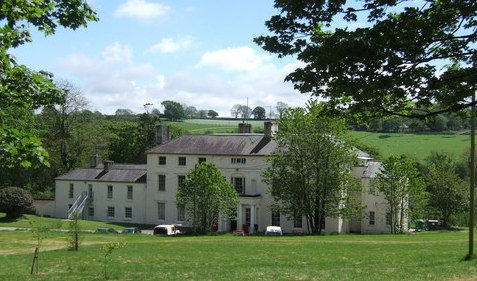
- Sealyham Mansion

- Location within Pembrokeshire

General information
- Location: Near Wolfscastle, Pembrokeshire, Wales
- Coordinates: 51°54′48″N 4°57′33″W

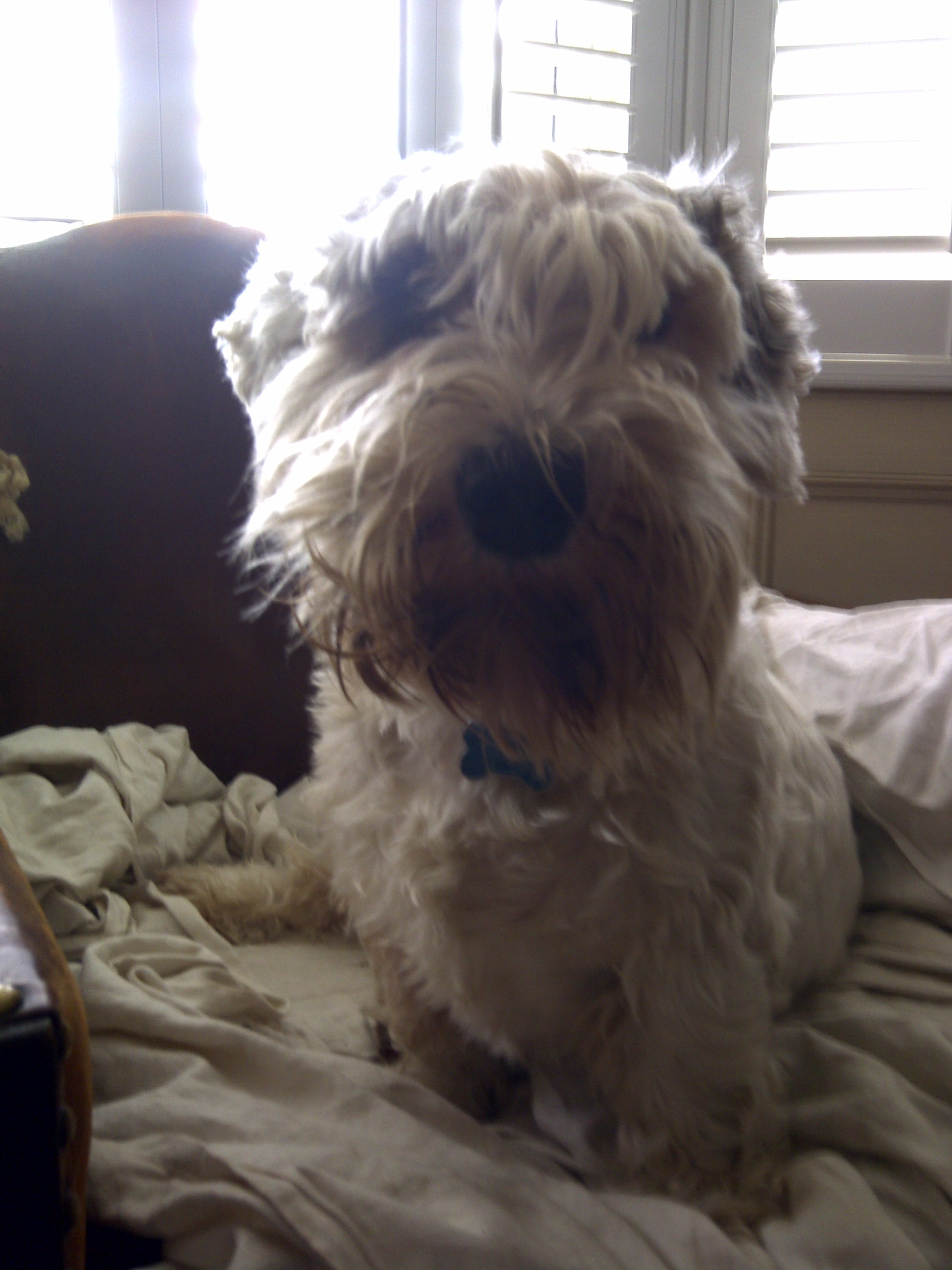
Ivor the Sealyham Terrier at home on his favourite chair

Sealyham Mansion, overlooking the little River Sealy, is a Georgian country house in Pembrokeshire, Wales, near Wolfscastle and to the southeast of Letterston. Known for the creation of the Sealyham Terrier there in the 1800s, the house served as a sanatorium and medical facility from 1923 to 1964. In 1986 it became a children's activity centre.

== History ==
King Edward III granted some land at Sealyham in Pembrokeshire (Wales) to Thomas Tucker in the fourteenth century. Tucker was a captain in the King's army about 1356. From that time the Tuckers remained identified with the manor until 1777. Tucker married Ursula del Holme and they built a house at this Sealyham property, which is some 200 miles (320 km) southwest of Liverpool. The house was rebuilt in the mid-18th century. In 1777 the heiress to the property, Mary Tucker, married John-Owen Edwardes. Their heir was William Edwardes (d. 1825), who was succeeded by William Edwardes-Tucker. Captain John Edwardes was a descendant of this couple. In 1840, Tucker-Edwardes was married to Anna Jane Jones of Letterston (Wales) and their only son was John Tucker-Edwardes (1845) who married Hester Phillips. He died in 1891 (at 82 years of age) and his father also died in the same year. As they had no offspring Sealyham House became the property of John Owen's brother, Owen, who also died two years later in 1893; his son Charles Gustaves Whittaker Edwardes who inherited the property died in 1902 without any children.

John Edwardes bred the Sealyham Terrier rare Welsh breed dog. It turned out the last of the descendant family members to live at the Sealyham Mansion was Catherine Octavia Edwards. She married Victor James Higgon. In 1905, they moved to Treffgarne Hall. Around 1910, portions of the land were sold to the Pembrokeshire County Council.

In 1920, Sealyham Mansion and its immediate associated land were sold to the King Edward VII Welsh National Memorial Association. The estate was converted into a tuberculosis hospital with 30 beds. It continued to function as a tuberculosis hospital to 1954. In 1955, it was re-purposed for elderly patients, but was permanently closed as a medical facility in 1964. In 1970, the Sealyham Mansion was sold to Nancy Ellen Perkins. She converted it into an apartment building as rentals. In 1980, it was sold again to an investment firm that used it for an outdoor activities center. It was resold in 1986 to the Sealyham Activity Centre for young people as an educational facility, run by Sam and Valerie Richards and John and Peggy Hone.

On Friday, May 21, 2021 Sealyham Activity Centre closed Sealyham Activity Centre offered both residential and non-residential trips with a variety of activities including high ropes, canoeing, coasteering, sailing, archery, kayaking, orienteering, team building, climbing and abseiling, hillwalking, bush craft and surfing. The centre offered accommodation for up to 120 people as well as catered and self-catered stays and adventure days for children and adults. Despite assurances on its website that 'we will definitely be here waiting for you in 2021' the business has had to close its doors for good. Posting on Sealyham's Facebook page the team said: "Sadly due to Covid we have been unable to keep the centre going. We have tried all avenues to keep going but to no avail."

25 November 2021 "The future of Sealyham mansion near Wolfscastle has been secured as an Active Learning Centre, offering coastal and woodland residential learning experiences to young people. It is anticipated to reopen in Autumn 2022."

== Sealyham Terrier ==
The Tucker-Edwardes family of the 1800s were one of the leading landowners of Pembrokeshire. Headed by Captain John Edwardes (1808–91), the family had the time and the means to breed dogs, which was almost a prerogative of people of noble families or military background. The Welsh Corgi, Fox Terrier (Wire), and the now extinct English White Terrier all played a part in the make up of the Sealyham, although Edwardes did not keep records. After Edwardes' death in 1891, other breeders began to work with Sealyhams, including Fred Lewis who promoted the breed. According to the Kennel Club Stud Book of 2009 there were only 47 dogs of Tucker-Edwardes' breed, making it an endangered breed.
