= Treffgarne =

Village and parish in Pembrokeshire, Wales

Coordinates: 51.8742°N 4.9694°W

Treffgarne: Welsh: Trefgarn
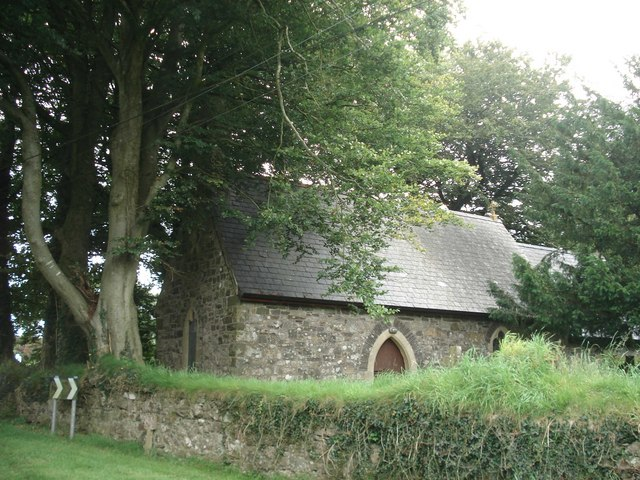
- Church of St Michael

- Location within Pembrokeshire
- OS grid reference: SM956237
- Community: Wolfscastle
- Principal area: Pembrokeshire
- Preserved county: Dyfed
- Country: Wales
- Sovereign state: United Kingdom
- Post town: HAVERFORDWEST
- Postcode district: SA62
- Dialling code: 01437
- Police: Dyfed-Powys
- Fire: Mid and West Wales
- Ambulance: Welsh
- UK Parliament: Preseli Pembrokeshire
- Senedd Cymru – Welsh Parliament: Preseli Pembrokeshire

Treffgarne (Welsh: Trefgarn, or town of the rock) is a small village and parish in Pembrokeshire, south-west Wales. It lies to the south of the Preseli Hills close to the Western Cleddau river, and close to the main A40 road from Fishguard to Haverfordwest. The area has an interesting local geology and evidence of mineral extraction at least as far back as Roman times. The present village is medieval in origin.

== Geology ==
The village name is derived from the Welsh-language words tref ("town") and carn ("cairn, mound, rock"). The reference in this case is to the Treffgarne Rocks, a series of ancient Ordovician rhyolite volcanic plugs, now exposed, that form the Roche Rhyolite Group. A number of interesting minerals have been recorded including brookite crystals (titanium dioxide) and possibly tin. Small regular cavities can be found in the rocks where crystals of at least 1 cm (1/2 in) width once resided. Gold has also been found at the rocks from drillcores and placer gold in the local Western Cleddau below the village. There is also an old legend of old gold workings near Treffgarne (possibly towards the farm Mount Pleasant) from the Roman period. Roman activity is certainly attested in the region with at least two Romano-British settlements nearby at Ambleston (Castle Flemming) and Wolfscastle and a possible extension of the Roman road from Carmarthen into Pembrokeshire.

== History ==
The site of the village itself goes back to at least the medieval period. Evidence for this is in the form of a nearby medieval strip lynchet field system to the north of the village. The current parish church, dedicated to St Michael, stands in a roughly, rectangular churchyard near the centre of the village. The church was totally rebuilt in 1881, though the 14th-15th century font and water stoup date from the 11th century. The church was mentioned in the Taxatio Ecclesiastica of 1291. Inside it are some ornate and colorful stained glass windows originally made in Munich and which were allegedly transported by horse and cart from St Giles' Cathedral in Edinburgh. The church may sit on an even older monastic site although this may be more likely located at Little Treffgarne Farm. In the 19th century, ruins were found near the church including arches and walls. It was thought that this was the remains of a Cistercian monastery but is more likely to have been the site of a hospitium serving pilgrims on the road to St David's.

There was evidence of earlier encampments near Treffarne, but these had been leveled by the 19th century.

Now bypassed by the modern A40 trunk road from Fishguard to Haverfordwest, the village originally sat on the turnpike that ran between these two towns. Until the 1970s the village was quite small with no more than 120 inhabitants but has since grown with the development of a modern estate to the west of the church. Close to the village to the west is Treffgarne Hall, erected in 1842 by Dr. Evans. It was converted into a restaurant in 1979 by executive chef Derek Stenson and his partner John Neville, former sous chef at the Dorchester Hotel, but this endeavour did not last.

Close to the village to the northeast is the disused Treffgarne Quarry which provided roadstone.

== Notable people ==
- Thomas Nicholas (1820–1879), Welsh antiquary and educator, born in Treffgarne.
