= Norfolk Terrier =

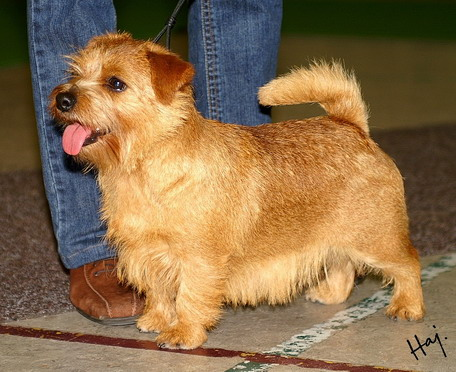
- A red-coloured Norfolk Terrier
- Origin: Great Britain
Traits
- Height: 25 to 30 cm (9.8 to 11.8 in)
- Weight: 5 to 7 kg (11 to 15 lb)
- Coat: Hard, wiry & straight
- Color: Red, wheaten, black and tan or grizzle
Kennel club standards
- The Kennel Club: standard
- Fédération Cynologique Internationale: standard

The Norfolk Terrier is a British breed of dog. Prior to gaining recognition as an independent breed in 1964, it was a variety of the Norwich Terrier, distinguished from the "prick eared" Norwich by its "drop ears" (or folded ears). Together, the Norfolk and Norwich Terriers are the smallest of the working terriers.

== Description ==
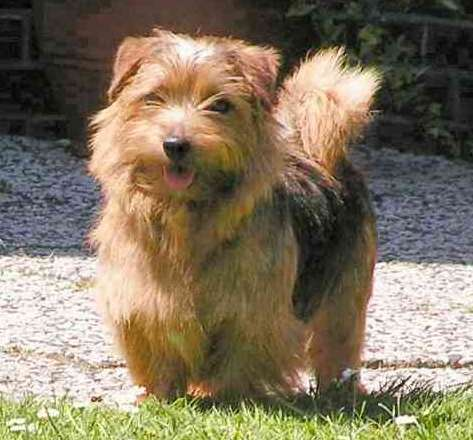
Norfolk Terrier has a wire-haired coat

=== Appearance ===
The Norfolk Terrier has a wire-haired coat which, according to the various national kennel clubs' breed standards, can be "all shades of red, wheaten, black and tan, or grizzle."

Norfolk Terriers are the smallest of the working terriers. They are active and compact, free moving, with good substance and bone. Good substance means good spring of rib and bone that matches the body such that the dog can be a very agile ratter or earth-dog.

Norfolk terriers are moderately proportioned dogs. A too heavy dog would not be agile. A too refined dog would make it a toy breed. Norfolks generally have more reach and drive and a stronger rear angulation, hence cover more ground than their Norwich cousins. Norfolk have good side gait owed to their balanced angulation front and rear and their slightly longer length of back.

The ideal height is 9 to 10 in (23 to 25 cm) at the withers and weight is about 11 to 12 lb (5.0 to 5.4 kg).

=== Temperament ===
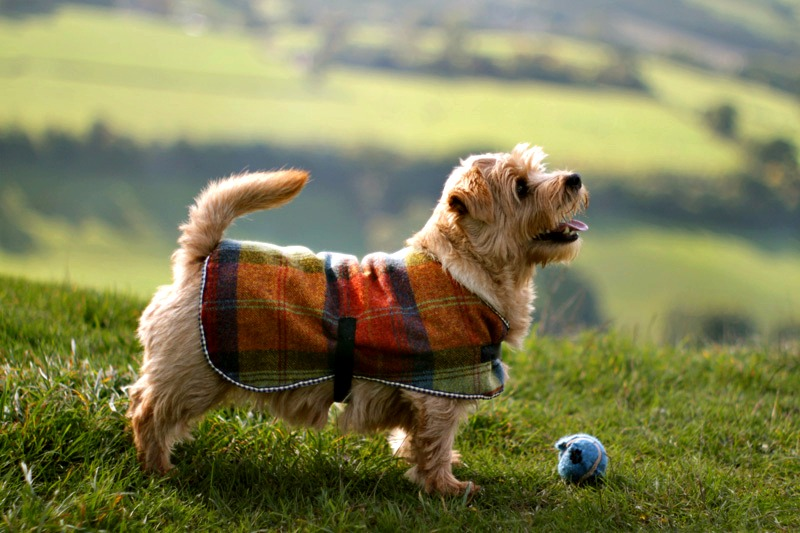
Norfolks are self-confident and carry themselves with presence and importance, holding their heads and tails up.

Norfolks are described as fearless, but can have an independent streak. They, along with Norwich Terriers and Border Terriers, have the softest temperaments of the Terrier Group. Norfolks work in packs and must get along with other dogs. As companions, they love people and children and do make good pets. Their activity level is generally reflective of the pace of their environment. This breed should not be kept or live outside since they thrive on human contact.

Generally, Norfolks are not given to digging but, like any dog, will dig out of boredom when left alone for too long a period. Norfolks are not yappers and are not particularly vocal; however, they will bark when appropriate given their watch-dog tendencies. They generally cohabit well with other household pets when introduced as a puppy. Outdoors, they are natural hunters with a strong prey drive for small vermin.

==== Working style ====
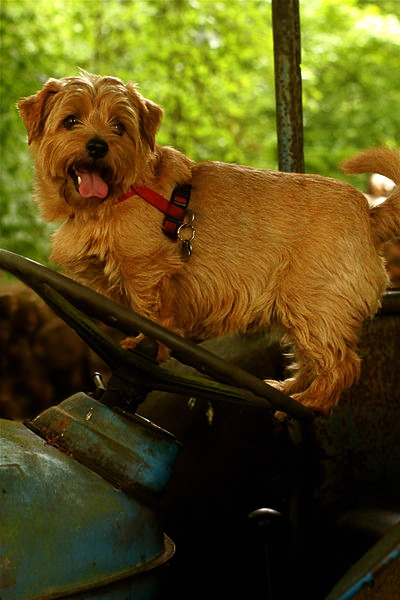
Norfolks were originally bred as barn dogs to get rid of the barn vermin.

Norfolks were originally bred as barn dogs to rid the barn of vermin. Some literature suggest that they were also occasionally used on the hunt to bolt animals of equal size from their den.

== Health ==
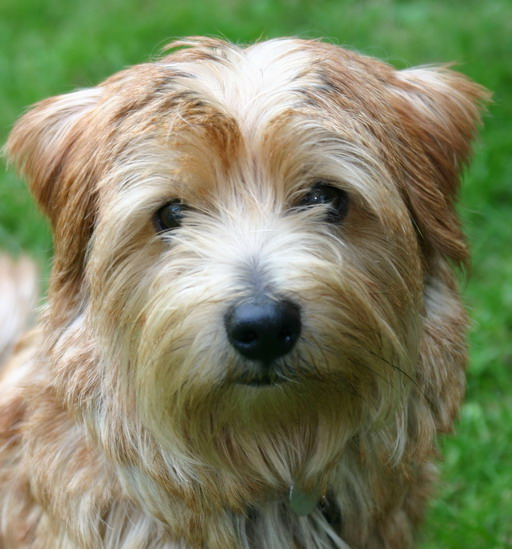
in the 1880s British sports men developed a working terrier named the Norwich Terrier that later changed to Norfolk Terrier.

A 2024 UK study found a life expectancy of 13.5 years for the breed compared to an average of 12.7 for purebreeds and 12 for crossbreeds.

Norfolks do have incidences of mitral valve disease, luxating patellas, and incorrect bites (where the teeth do not align with the breed standard, i.e. overshot or undershot). Norfolks most often have shallow hip sockets and many breedlines are dysplastic. There has never been a Norfolk Terrier recognized by the Orthopedic Foundation for Animals (OFA) as having "excellent" rated hips. Therefore, responsible breeders are testing for hip dysplasia. Breeders that do not radiograph hips and have them evaluated by either OFA or PennHip, cannot answer questions regarding hip dysplasia in their breeding program.

Norfolks generally have medium to small litters. Responsible breeders only breed healthy dogs who are of good temperament, good pedigree lineage and best reflect the breed standard. The demand for Norfolk is far greater than the supply. The environment in which they are raised directly impacts the temperament of the puppy for its lifetime.

== Care ==
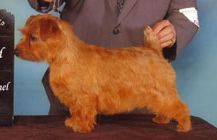
A Norfolk Terrier at a conformation show

=== Grooming ===
These breeds have a double coat: a harsh, wiry topcoat and a soft, warm undercoat. Ideally, the coat is combed daily with a steel "greyhound" comb, but all that is really necessary for grooming a companion dog is a good combing once a week to remove the loose, dead hairs and prevent matting. As a minimum, the coat is hand stripped once in the Autumn and once in the Spring. Clipping or cutting ruins the coat's colours and harsh texture. A Norfolk Terrier can be washed with a dog shampoo when it is dirty. The breed is considered largely hypoallergenic, although they do shed minimally year-round.

== History ==
In the 1880s, British sportsmen developed a working terrier of East Anglia in eastern England. The Norwich Terrier and later the drop-eared variety now known as the Norfolk Terrier, were believed to have been developed by crossing local terrier-like dogs, small, short-legged Irish Terrier breeds and the small red terriers used by the Romani ratters of Norfolk (the county of which Norwich is the county town).

They were first called the Cantab Terrier when they became fashionable for students to keep in their rooms at Cambridge University in England. Later, they were called the Trumpington Terrier, after Trumpington Street where the breed was further developed at a livery stable. Then, just prior to World War I, a prominent Irish horse rider Frank Jones sold quantities of the short-legged terriers to the United States, so there they were called Jones Terriers. It was Jones who designated the terriers were from Norwich.

In 1932, the Norwich was granted acceptance into the English Kennel Club and the first written standard was created. The American Kennel Club registered the first Norwich Terrier in 1936. In 1964, The Kennel Club reclassified the drop-ear variety as it its own breed, the Norfolk Terrier, and the prick-eared variety retained the name Norwich Terrier. The American Kennel Club and Canadian Kennel Club both recognized the division of the Norwich Terrier breed in 1979. The Norfolk Terrier was recognized by the United Kennel Club in 1979.

== See also ==
- List of dog breeds
