= Zentarr Elizabeth =

Show dog

- Other name: Elizabeth
- Species: Canis lupus familiaris
- Breed: Lhasa Apso
- Sex: Female
- Born: 29 January 2005
- Died: May 2017 (aged 12)
- Title: Best In Show at Crufts (2012)
- Predecessor: Sh Ch. Vbos The Kentuckian (Flat-Coated Retriever)
- Successor: Ch. Soletrader Peek A Boo (Petit Basset Griffon Vendéen)
- Owner: Margaret Anderson
- Parents: Ch. Fengola Simply WKD (sire); Ch. Zentarr Madonna (dam)
- Offspring: Ch. Zentarr George

Ch. Zentarr Elizabeth (2005–2017), also known as Elizabeth, was a Lhasa Apso show dog bred and handled by Margaret Anderson who won Best in Show at Crufts in 2012. She also placed third at the Eukanuba World Challenge in 2011.

== Show histories ==
Elizabeth was Reserve Best in Show at the Midland Lhasa Apso Association conformation show in April 2009. She was breed leader in the Dog World (newspaper) / Arden Grange Top dog competitions in 2009 and Best in Show at the British Utility Breeds Association championship show in 2010.

Elizabeth won the qualifying heat of the Champion Stakes at West of England Ladies Kennel Society show in April 2011 under judge Albert Wight. This in turn qualified the dog for the 2011 Eukanuba Champion Stakes near Kenilworth along with 25 dogs from other shows around the country. The 25 were broken up into five randomly assigned groups of five to be judged against the breed standards for each breed, with the winner from each of those group going forward to the final. She qualified for the final along with the Bichon Frise Ch. Pamplona Bring Me Sunshine, the Bearded Collie Ch. Senglas Indiana Jones, West Highland White Terrier Ch. Lamsmore Fitzwritin and the Pointer Sh Ch. Kiswahili Martin at Kanix. Elizabeth was once more victorious and after her owner confirmed the dog had a pet passport, qualified for the Eukanuba World Challenge in Orlando, Florida in December 2011. Elizabeth first qualified along with eleven other dogs for the final, and finished overall in third place.

In 2011 she was the breed leader in the Dog World (newspaper) / Arden Grange Top Dog competition. She won the utility group at Manchester show in January 2012 and she also won Best of Breed at the South East Lhasa Apso Society show that year. She has been awarded 24 CCs

=== Crufts ===
At Crufts in 2011, she won Best of Breed and went on to place reserve in the Utility Group to the Standard Poodle Ch. Vicmars Rave on JW.

Elizabeth entered Crufts in 2012. She won the Lhasa Apso Best of Breed title and moved on to take the Utility Group, qualifying her for the Best in Show round. Elizabeth lined up in the final against a Newfoundland, a Pomeranian, an Irish Water Spaniel, an Old English Sheepdog and a Norwich Terrier. She defeated the other six dogs in the final to take the title of Best in Show.

The media response linked Elizabeth's victory with the Diamond Jubilee of Queen Elizabeth II, with Paul Calahan of The Independent describing it as "Fittingly in a Diamond Jubilee year".

== Later life ==
Following her Crufts win, Elizabeth had a single puppy from her sole litter. The dog, Zentarr George, also went on to win Champion status in the United Kingdom. Elizabeth died in May 2017.
