= Shargleam Blackcap =

Ch. Shargleam Blackcap
- Other name: Brett
- Species: Canis lupus familiaris
- Breed: Flat-Coated Retriever
- Sex: Male
- Born: 26 June 1977
- Occupation: Show dog
- Title: Best In Show at Crufts (1980)
- Predecessor: Eng Am Ch. Callaghan of Leander (Kerry Blue Terrier)
- Successor: Ch. Astley Portia of Rua (Irish Setter)
- Owner: Pat Chapman
- Parents: Ch. Damases Tarquol of Ryshot (sire); Ch. Yonday Willow-Warbler of Shargleam (dam)
- Awards: 3 all breed championship best in shows and 63 cc's

Ch. Shargleam Blackcap, (born 26 June 1977) – also known as Brett – was a Flat-Coated Retriever show dog bred. Handled by Mrs Pat Chapman he won Best in Show at Crufts in 1980. He is a direct ancestor of both Sh Ch. Vbos The Kentuckian and Ch. Almanza Backseat Driver, who won best in show at Crufts in 2011 and 2022 respectively.

== Show history ==
In 1980, Brett became the first Flat-Coated Retriever to win Best in Show at Crufts. Reserve Best in Show went to the previous year's winner, the Kerry Blue Terrier Ch. Callaghan of Leander. He was the most successful showdog of his breed in his era, and became a successful sire. Crufts Best in Show has twice since been awarded to Flat-Coated Retrievers, Sh Ch. Vbos The Kentuckian in 2011 and Ch. Almanza Backseat Driver in 2022, both of which are descended from Brett. Brett was the last Flat-Coated Retriever to win a Best in Show in a multi-breed show until Vbos The Kentuckian at the East of England show in 2009.

== Pedigree ==
Ch. Fenrivers Golden Rod
Ch. Tonggreen Sparrow Boy
Tonggreen Swift
Ch. Damases Tarquol of Ryshot
Hallbent Woodcock
Hallbent Contessa
Hallbent Dusk
Ch. Shargleam Blackcap
Sh Ch. Wood Man
Ch. Kenstaff Whipster
Birchinlee Wendy
Ch. Yonday Willow-Warbler of Shargleam
Teal of HawksNest
Claverdon Flapper
Claverdon Rhapsody
