= Efbe's Hidalgo At Goodspice =

Canadian dog

Ch. Efbe's Hidalgo At Goodspice
- Charmin with the best in show trophy at Crufts.
- Other name: Charmin
- Species: Canis lupus familiaris
- Breed: Sealyham Terrier
- Sex: Male
- Born: May 19, 2004
- Died: October 17, 2018 (aged 14)
- Occupation: Show dog
- Title: Best In Show at Crufts (2009); Best in Show at World Dog Show 2008; Best in Show at AKC/Eukanuba National Championship 2007
- Predecessor: Crufts – Ch. Jafrak Philippe Olivier (Giant Schnauzer)
- Successor: Crufts – Sh Ch/Aust Ch. Hungargunn Bear It'n Mind (Vizsla)
- Owner: Judith Carter/Margery Good
- Parents: Ch. Goodspice Pass The Pepper (sire); Ch. Efbe's Esmeralda (dam)

Ch. Efbe's Hidalgo At Goodspice (May 19, 2004– October 17, 2018), also known as Charmin, was a male Sealyham Terrier who was the Best in Show at the American Kennel Club National Championship in 2007, World Dog Show in 2008, and Crufts in 2009. He also won the Terrier Group at the Westminster Kennel Club dog show in 2008.

== Early life ==
Charmin was bred in Canada by France Bergeron, a Canadian Kennel Club life member from Quebec, Canada. His owner/handler Margery Good described him as being "squeezeably soft" when he was a puppy, which brought him his "Charmin" nickname which co-owner Judith Carter gave him.

Charmin's owner for his big wins included Sandra Middlebrooks who is the owner of the 2011 Westminster Kennel Club Best in Show winning Pekingese.

When at home he was treated like any other house pet, and enjoyed playing with Babs, Margery's assistant's Parson Russell Terrier. When he could, he slept in the same bed as Margery in hotels, but because at home the bed was too high, he either slept on the floor next to the bed or next to the toilet. "He's figured out that's the first place I go after I get up", explained his owner.

== Show histories ==
=== Westminster ===
In 2006, Charmin won an "Award of Merit" at the Westminster Kennel Club Dog Show. Ch. Stonebroke Right On The Money aka "Ben Low" won "Best of Breed", and Ch. Dubwyre The Charmed One won "Best of Opposite Sex". Both Charmin and Ben Low would repeat these results in 2007, with Ch. Hotspice Siamese Wild Orchid taking "Best of Opposite Sex".

In 2008, Charmin won "Best of Breed" before going on to take the Terrier Group with Ch. Roundtown Mercedes Of Maryscot, a Scottish Terrier, placing second, and Ch. Max-Well's Viper, a Norfolk Terrier, placing third. Charmin retained the "Best in Breed" title in 2009 but placed second overall in the Terrier Group, losing out to Ch. Roundtown Mercedes Of Maryscot. The Scottish Terrier would go on to win Best in Show at Westminster in 2010, Charmin was not entered, but another Efbe dog from an earlier litter of the same parents won Best of Breed. Charmin returned to Westminster in 2011, taking the breed group, with his daughter Ch. Goodspice Brawny Brehannon also winning an award of merit.

=== World Dog Show ===
Charmin was entered in the Fédération Cynologique Internationale's World Dog Show 2008, held in Stockholm, Sweden. Although Sweden fielded most of the breed and group winners, Charmin won the title of "Best in Show", with 2007 Swedish Champion Ch. Northgates As You Like It, a Pharaoh Hound, placing "Reserve Best in Show".

=== American Kennel Club National Show ===
At the 2007 AKC/Eukanuba National Championship, Charmin was awarded the title of "Best in Show", taking home a prize of US$50,000 for his owner, and a lifetime supply of dog food for himself.

Because of the win at the World Dog Show, Charmin qualified to compete in the 2008 Eukanuba World Challenge, where he finished as the runner-up.

=== Crufts ===
Competing against more than 22,000 other dogs, Charmin won the Terrier Group, and then "Best in Show" at Crufts 2009, the Kennel Club's premier dog show in Birmingham, England. This victory highlighted the Sealyham Terrier breed in the UK which is in danger of becoming extinct. Only 43 were born in the UK during 2008, placing them in the top three of the Kennel Club's most-endangered list. In comparison, 45,233 Labrador Retrievers were born during the same period. Unusually however, following the broadcast of Pedigree Dogs Exposed, the BBC announced that it would not televise Crufts for the first time in 42 years. This meant that Charmin's victory was only seen online.
