= Soletrader Peek A Boo =

Retired show dog

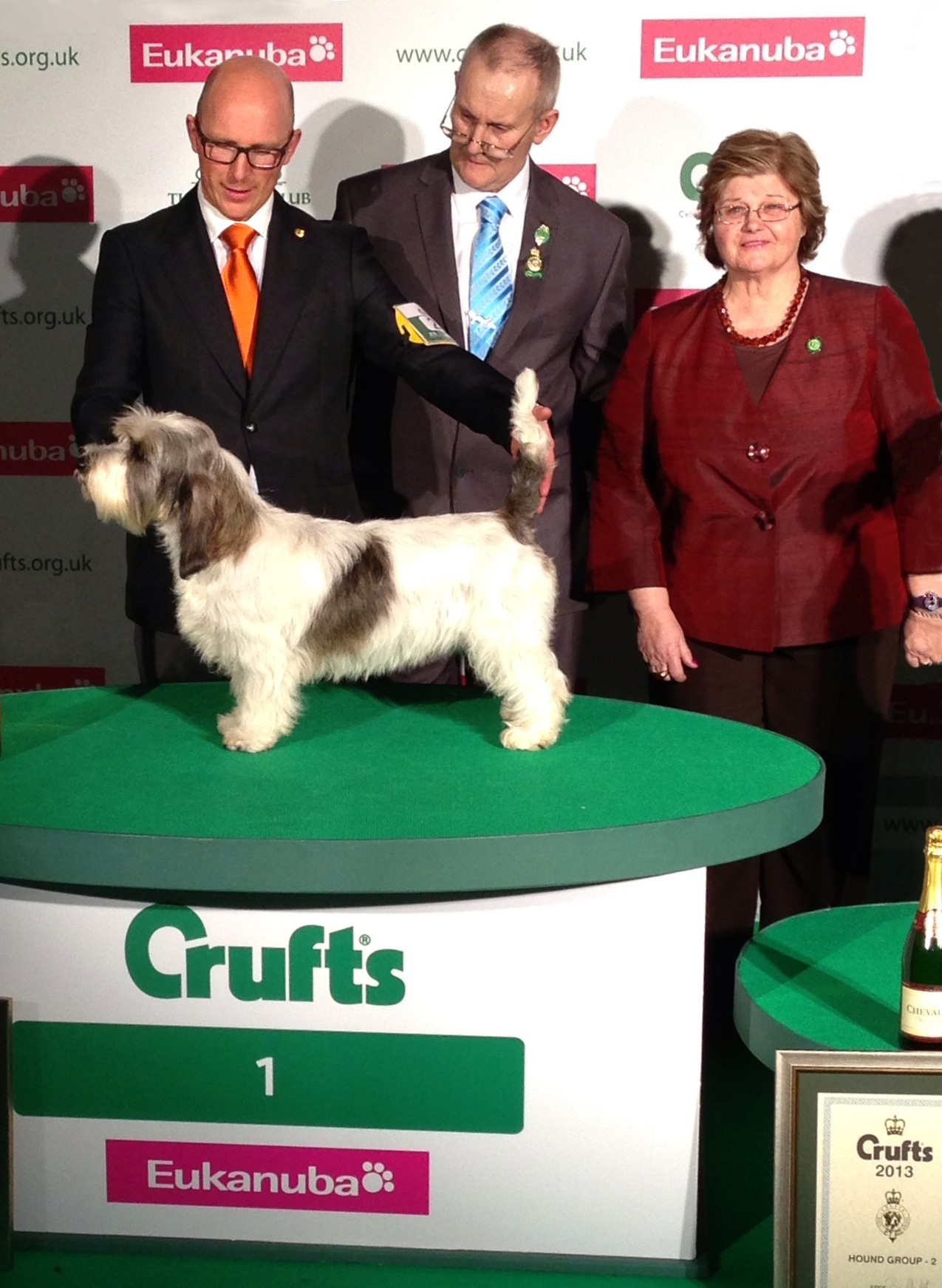
- Other name: Jilly
- Species: Canis lupus familiaris
- Breed: Petit Basset Griffon Vendéen
- Sex: Female
- Born: 29 October 2009 (age 16); Wallingford, Oxfordshire, England
- Title: Best In Show at Crufts (2013)
- Predecessor: Ch. Zentarr Elizabeth (Lhasa Apso)
- Successor: Ch./Am Ch Afterglow Maverick Sabre (Standard Poodle)
- Owners: Sara Robertson and Wendy Doherty

Ch. Soletrader Peek A Boo (born 29 October 2009), also known as Jilly, was a Petit Basset Griffon Vendéen show dog owned by Sara Robertson and Wendy Doherty and handled by Gavin Robertson, who won Best in Show at Crufts in 2013. Jilly's owners decided to retire her following her Crufts win. She died 11-years-old in February 2021.

== Background ==
Jilly was owned by Sara Robertson and Wendy Doherty and handled by Gavin Robertson. As of March 2013, she lived in Wallingford, Oxfordshire. Jilly's dam was Ch. Soletrader My Aphrodisiac, aka "Dizzy", who was the most successful dog of her breed in the UK.

== Crufts ==
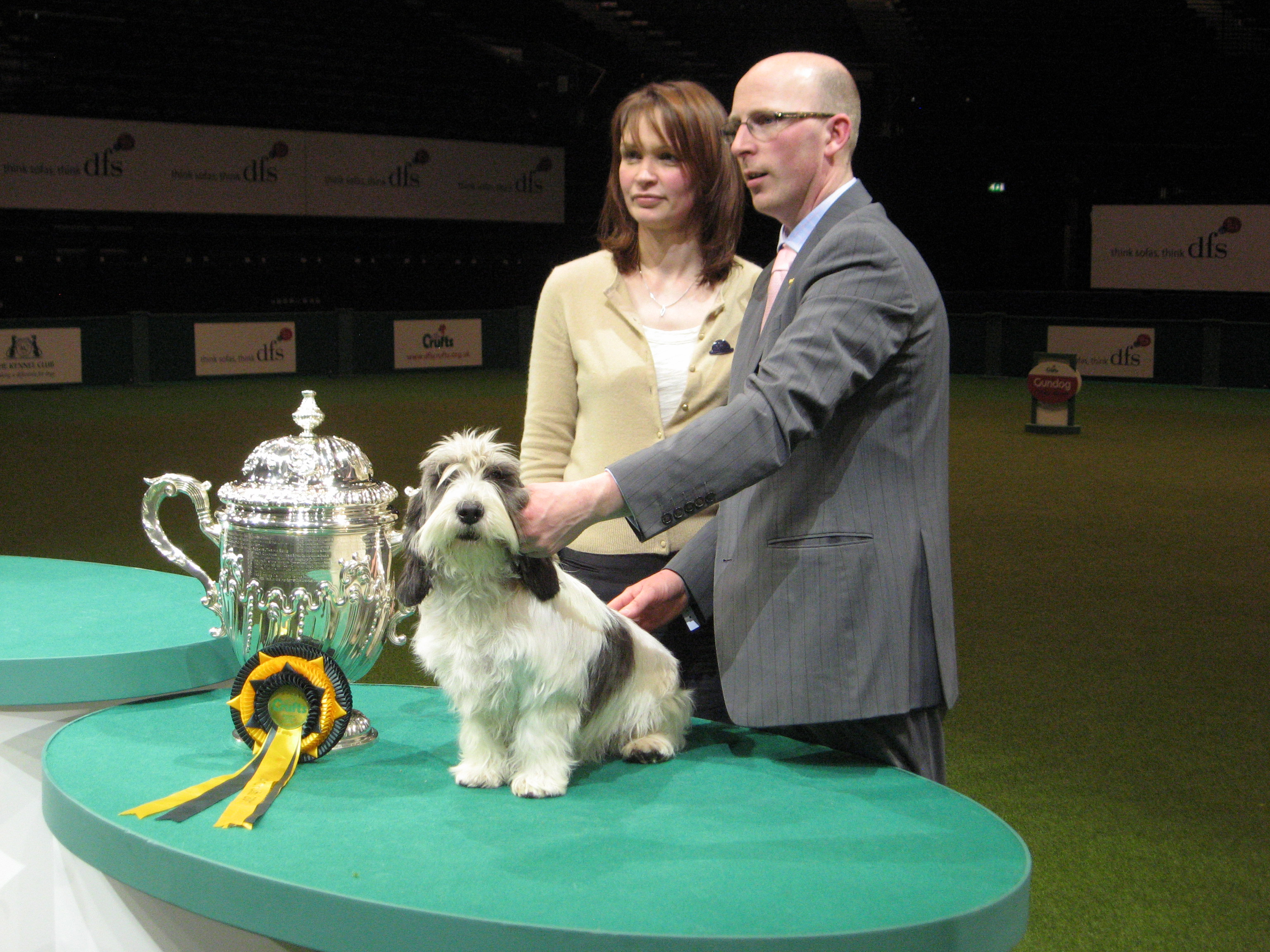
Soletrader Peek A Boo, after being named Reserve Best in Show at Crufts in 2011

At Crufts in 2011, Jilly was reserve to Best in Show winner Sh Ch. Vbos The Kentuckian, a Flat-Coated Retriever. The following year, Jilly was awarded second in the hound group.

In 2013, Jilly entered Crufts once again, along with 20,000 dogs. She was awarded Best of Breed and Best in Group for Hounds, qualifying her for the Best in Show round. On 10 March, Jilly competed against seven other dogs in the final, and Jilly was awarded Best in Show.

Gavin Robertson, Jilly's handler, revealed that Jilly would be retired after Crufts. He said "We always decided this would be Jilly's retirement show, so really wanted this to be her best. I can't express how happy I feel, she never lets me down, she's my once in a lifetime dog. I am sad Sunday will be our last show, but she has really given me everything. It is like our cup final."

In his best in show report, judge Geoff Corish stated: "I have admired this bitch since she was very young but today was the first time I was able to put my hands on her. She is a delight to go over, the most lovely head & soft expression. She has neck & the right balance, super in coat & she was in the hardest of condition, they must have walked her miles. But it’s on the move that she really comes into her own. She has so much charisma moving, that I could watch her all day."

== Show career ==
Jilly gained her first Challenge Certificate (CC) when she was a puppy and was overall Top Hound in 2011 and fourth top dog all breeds. She won her first all-breed championship best in show at Paignton that year. Her win at Crufts 2013 took her number of all-breed best in show wins to eight. She was Top Dog all breeds in 2012. At Crufts 2013, she was awarded her 28th CC which equalled her dams breed CC record.

== Fundraising ==
On 10 June 2013 Jilly's handler, Gavin Robertson, undertook a sponsored walk to raise funds for charity. Starting from the NEC in Birmingham, where Jilly had secured her Crufts best in show win, and finishing in central London, the distance covered was 140 miles. Jilly took part in the walk, although did not walk the entire distance, and at various stages was accompanied by other show dogs, including the other six group winners from Crufts 2013 and the handlers or owners of previous Crufts best in show winners. Clare Balding, one of the presenters of the Crufts television coverage, also joined a stage of the walk with her dog. "Jilly's Jolly Jaunt" as it became known, took a week to complete. A total of £49,000 was raised; on 15 October 2013 a cheque for £17,150 was presented to DogLost, Great Ormond Street Hospital benefitted by £29,400, and the remainder, £2,450 was donated to the Kennel Club Charitable Trust.

== Pedigree ==
Swe Ch. Villaudens Ask
Can Ch. Soletrader Bjorn Borg
Ch. Afterglow Penelope Pitstop
Ch & Dutch Ch. Cappuccino Van Tum-Tums Vriendjes
Ch. Soletrader Dunc 'n' Disorderly
Soletrader Scarlet O'Hara
Ch. Willowbrae Amazing Grace for Afterglow
Ch. Soletrader Peek A Boo
Ch. Dehra Ypres of Bondlea
Ch. Soletrader Dunc 'n' Disorderly
Willowbrae Belbook 'n' Candle for Afterglow
Ch. Soletrader My Aphrodisiac
Ch. Garwedd du Greffier du Roi at Tangear (imp)
Ch. Willowbrae Amazing Grace for Afterglow
Clunebrae Kikimora of Famecliff
