= List of Best in Show winners of Crufts =

Dog show winners

The most successful owner at winning Crufts was H. S. Lloyd, pictured here with three dogs from his "of Ware" kennel including Luckystar of Ware, two-time winner of Best in Show (pictured middle).

The title Best in Show is awarded to the dog chosen as winner of the annual Crufts dog show, according to conformation show rules. This title was first awarded in 1928, the initial winner being Primley Sceptre, a fawn Greyhound. Previously, Crufts had used the title "Best Champion", sponsored by the Illustrated Kennel News, which was awarded from 1905 to 1914. The first winner of Best Champion was Ch. The Sable Mite, a Pomeranian. According to Crufts: The Official History the first winner of that award was the first dog to be considered the "best" at a Crufts show, although it only lists winners between 1906 and 1912.

When Best Champion was introduced at Crufts in 1905, it was seen by Charles Cruft as an extension of the other titles already available at the show. The class was one of several classes reserved for Crufts subscribers at the cost of a guinea per year. Because of the restriction in entry, there were years when the winner of Best Champion was defeated in other classes which were not restricted to subscribers. Crufts was not the first dog show in the UK to introduce this type of title, the first event to do so was at the Cambridge Canine Society Show in 1900.

The change to Best in Show was considered by the press to be of little significance and was not promoted by Charles Cruft, and did not require a dog to have won its Best of Breed class until 1936. It did however remove restrictions on entry, which remained until the mid-1960s when entry to Crufts was restricted to dogs who had already become a champion by gaining championship points at other dog shows.

The most successful breed in the modern era since Best in Show was introduced has been the English Cocker Spaniel. Of the breed's seven show titles, all but one of them were owned and bred by Herbert Summers Lloyd (known predominantly as H. S. Lloyd) from the "of Ware" kennel. Only four dogs have won Best in Show on more than one occasion, and on three of these occasions they were English Cocker Spaniels owned by Lloyd. The fourth occasion was a Labrador Retriever named Bramshaw Bob, owned by Countess Lorna Howe who is the second most successful breeder in the show's history as she also won Best in Show once more with another Labrador in 1937, Ch. Cheveralla Ben of Banchory. Although no dog has won Crufts more than once since H. S. Lloyd's Tracey Witch of Ware in 1950, owner Jackie Lorimer won the title in 1993 with Irish Setter Sh Ch. Danaway Debonair and again with the dog's son, Sh Ch. Caspians Intrepid in 1999.

Crufts was not held between 1918 and 1920 due to World War I and again from 1941 to 1947 due to World War II. In addition to war-related cancellations, Crufts was not staged in 1954 because of the electricians’ strike and in 2021 due to COVID-19 pandemic.

In 2001, the show was postponed to May from March because of the foot-and-mouth disease crisis.

== 1905 to 1914 ==
Best Champion at Cruft's
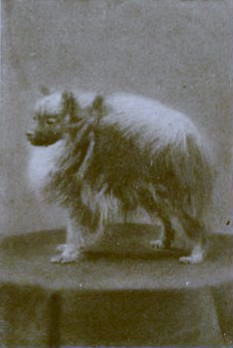
- Ch. The Sable Mite, the first dog to win Best Champion at Cruft's in 1905.
- Country: United Kingdom
- Presented by: Crufts
- First award: 1905
- Final award: 1914
- Website: http://www.crufts.co.uk

=== Best Champion ===
First awarded in 1905, it was listed as the 51st and last out of the members-only trophies on its introduction in the show schedule. The description of the award read, "AN ANTIQUE SILVER CUP, value FIVE GUINEAS, offered by the Proprietors of the "ILLUSTRATED KENNEL NEWS," for the best Champion of any breed in the Show. To be won outright."

| Year | Prefix | Winner | Image | Breed | Owner(s) | Ref(s) |
|---|---|---|---|---|---|---|
| 1905 | Ch. | The Sable Mite | "A greyscale photo of a small fluffy dog looking to the left." | Pomeranian | Mrs Vale Nicholas | |
| 1906 | Ch. | Wishaw Leader | "A greyscale photo of a rough collie looking to the right." | Scotch Collie (Note: Ch. Wishaw Leader was registered as a Scotch Collie, a breed now split into two breeds, Smooth Collie and Rough Collie.) | Mr R A Tait | |
| 1907 | Ch. | The Sable Mite | "A greyscale photo of a small fluffy dog looking to the left." | Pomeranian | Mrs Vale Nicholas | |
| 1908 | Ch. | Shelton Viking | "A greyscale photo of a large dark coloured dog facing right." | Newfoundland | Mrs Vale Nicholas | |
| 1909 | Ch. | Clareholm Dora | "A greyscale photo of a long low spaniel in black and grey, the dog is facing left but has turned its head slightly towards the camera. | Field Spaniel | Mrs E. Rouse | |
| 1910 | Ch. | Broadwater Banker | "A greyscale photo of a typical looking greyhound with a docked tail. It faces right. | Greyhound | Mrs E. Chapman | |
| 1911 | Ch. | Collarbone of Notts | | Wire Fox Terrier | Mr A.E.G. Way | |
| 1912 | Ch. | The Pride of Sussex | | St Bernard | Mr H Stocken & Miss Samuel | |
| 1913 | Ch. | Choo-tai of Egham | | Pekingese | Miss V. Ashton Cross | |
| 1914 | Ch. | St. Blaise | | Greyhound | Miss D. Beadon | |

== 1928 to present ==
Best in Show at Crufts
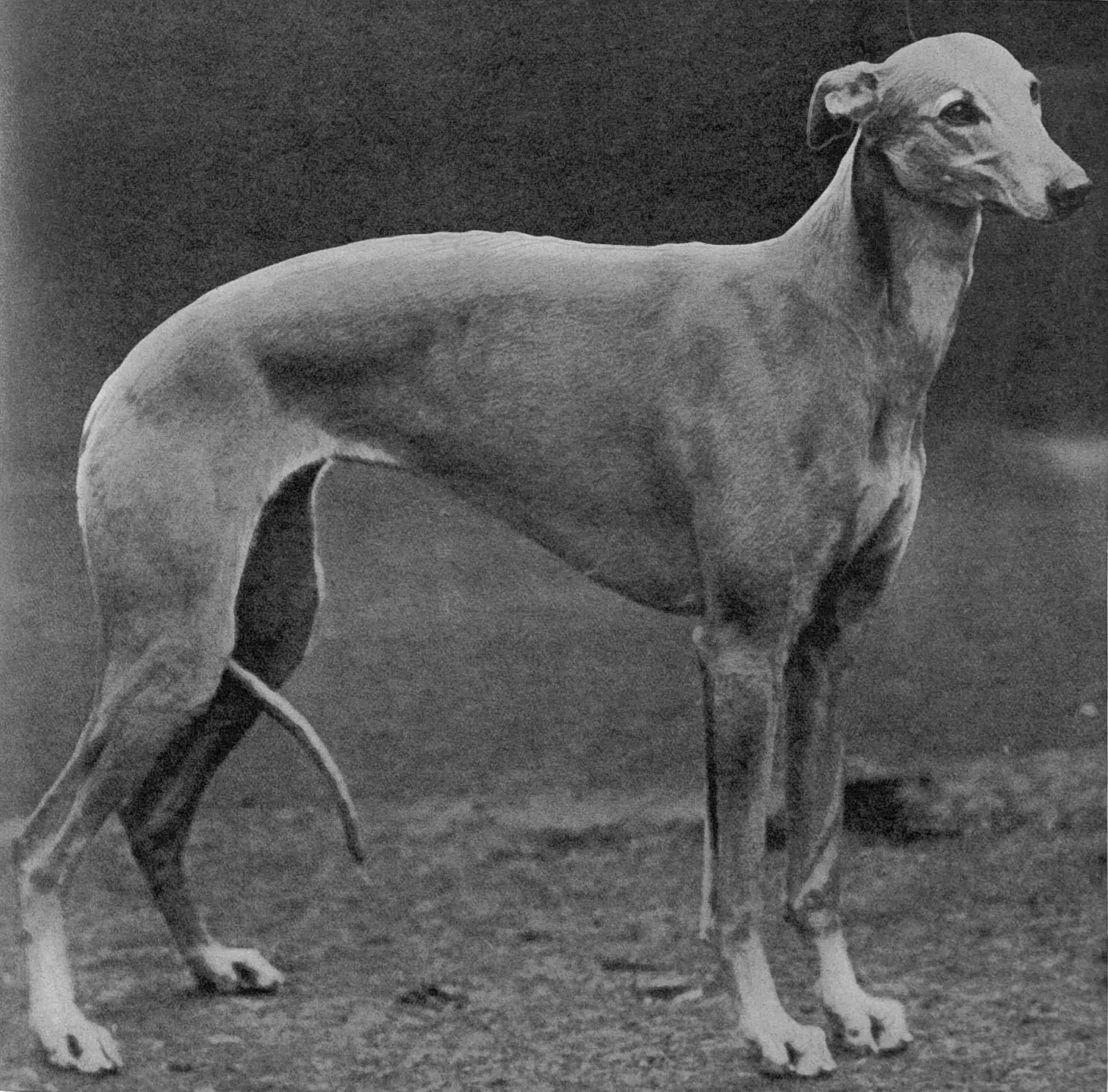
- Primley Sceptre, first winner of Best in Show in 1928
- Country: United Kingdom
- Presented by: Crufts
- First award: 1928
- Final award: Present
- Currently held by: Sh Ch. Vanitonia Soloist (Clumber Spaniel)
- Website: Official website

=== Best in Show ===
Introduced in 1928, the prize was first described as "STERLING SILVER GOLD GILT 10-inch REPOUSSE ROSE BOWL. Decorated in flowers on circular base, for the best Dog in the Show. (OPEN TO ALL)".

During World War II, Crufts was not staged and in 1954, the dog-based competition was not held because of the electricians’ strike. In 2001, the canine festival was held in May, two months later than planned, because of the foot-and-mouth disease. The show was not held in 2021 due to the COVID-19 pandemic.

| Year | Prefix | Winner | Breed | Group | Owner(s) | Ref(s) |
|---|---|---|---|---|---|---|
| 1928 | – | Primley Sceptre | Greyhound | Hound | Mr Herbert Whitley | |
| 1929 | – | Heather Necessity | Scottish Terrier | Terrier | Mr Robert Chapman | |
| 1930 | – | Luckystar of Ware | English Cocker Spaniel | Gundog | Mr H. S. Lloyd | |
| 1931 | – | Luckystar of Ware | English Cocker Spaniel | Gundog | Mr H. S. Lloyd | |
| 1932 | – | Bramshaw Bob | Labrador Retriever | Gundog | Countess Lorna Howe | |
| 1933 | – | Bramshaw Bob | Labrador Retriever | Gundog | Countess Lorna Howe | |
| 1934 | – | Southball Moonstone | Greyhound | Hound | B Harland-Worden | |
| 1935 | – | Pennine Prima Donna | Pointer | Gundog | Mr Arthur Eggleston | |
| 1936 | Ch. | Choonam Hung Kwong | Chow Chow | Utility | Mrs. Violet Mannooch | |
| 1937 | Ch. | Cheveralla Ben of Banchory | Labrador Retriever | Gundog | Countess Lorna Howe | |
| 1938 | – | Exquisite Model of Ware | English Cocker Spaniel | Gundog | Mr H. S. Lloyd | |
| 1939 | – | Exquisite Model of Ware | English Cocker Spaniel | Gundog | Mr H. S. Lloyd | |
| 1940 | Competition not held due to World War II and ownership change from the family of Charles Cruft to The Kennel Club. | | | | | |
| 1941 | Competition not held due to World War II. | | | | | |
| 1942 | Competition not held due to World War II. | | | | | |
| 1943 | Competition not held due to World War II. | | | | | |
| 1944 | Competition not held due to World War II. | | | | | |
| 1945 | Competition not held due to World War II. | | | | | |
| 1946 | Competition not held due to World War II. | | | | | |
| 1947 | Competition not held due to World War II. | | | | | |
| 1948 | – | Tracey Witch of Ware | English Cocker Spaniel | Gundog | Mr H. S. Lloyd | |
| 1949 | Competition not held. (Note: The date of the event was moved from October to February, causing the event to skip a year.) | | | | | |
| 1950 | – | Tracey Witch of Ware | English Cocker Spaniel | Gundog | Mr H. S. Lloyd | |
| 1951 | – | Twynstar Dyma-Fi | Welsh Terrier | Terrier | Capt. & Mrs I Morlais Thomas | |
| 1952 | Ch. | Noways Chuckles | Bulldog | Utility | Mr John T. Bernard | |
| 1953 | Ch. | Elch Elder of Ouborough | Great Dane | Working | Mr Bill G. Siggers | |
| 1954 | Competition not held due to electricians’ strike | | | | | |
| 1955 | Ch. | Tzigane Affri of Nashend | Poodle (Standard) | Utility | Mrs. April Proctor | |
| 1956 | – | Treetops Golden Falcon | Greyhound | Hound | Mr. Judy de Cassembroot and Miss Bobbie Greenish | |
| 1957 | Ch. | Volkrijk of Vorden | Keeshond | Utility | Mrs. Rene Tucker | |
| 1958 | Ch. | Chiming Bells | Pointer | Gundog | Mrs. Bill Parkinson | |
| 1959 | Ch. | Sandstorm Saracen | Welsh Terrier | Terrier | Mrs. D M Leach and Mrs. Margaret Thomas | |
| 1960 | – | Sulhamstead Merman | Irish Wolfhound | Hound | Florence Nagle and Marion Clark | |
| 1961 | Ch. | Riverina Tweedsbairn | Airedale Terrier | Terrier | Mr Pat McCaughey and Mr Mac Shutch | |
| 1962 | Ch. | Crackwyn Cockspur | Wire Fox Terrier | Terrier | Mr. Harry L Gill | |
| 1963 | – | Rogerholm Recruit | Lakeland Terrier | Terrier | Mr. Bill Rogers | |
| 1964 | Sh Ch. (Note: The abbreviation Sh Ch stands for Show Champion, a title awarded to gundogs and Border Collies for winning three Challenge Certificates under three different judges with at least one of those Certificates being awarded when the dog in question is more than twelve months old.) | Silbury Soames of Madavale | English Setter | Gundog | Mrs. Ada Williams | |
| 1965 | Ch. | Fenton of Kentwood | German Shepherd | Pastoral | Sonnica H Godden | |
| 1966 | – | Oakington Puckshill Amber Sunblush | Poodle (Toy) | Utility | Mrs. Clare E Perry | |
| 1967 | Ch. | Stingray of Derryabah | Lakeland Terrier | Terrier | Mr. Wilf and Mrs. Betty Postlewaite | |
| 1968 | Ch. | Fanhill Faune | Dalmatian | Utility | Mrs. Jean Woodyatt | |
| 1969 | Ch. | Hendrawen's Nibelung of Charavigne | German Shepherd | Pastoral | Mr Edwin and Mrs Shirley White | |
| 1970 | – | Bergerie Knur | Pyrenean Mountain Dog | Working | Mr Fred and Mrs Constance Prince | |
| 1971 | Ch. | Ramacon Swashbuckler | German Shepherd | Pastoral | Prince Ahmed Husain | |
| 1972 | Ch. | Abraxas Audacity | English Bull Terrier | Terrier | Violet Drummond-Dick | |
| 1973 | – | Alansmere Aquarius | Cavalier King Charles Spaniel | Toy | Mr Alan Hall and Mr John Evans | |
| 1974 | Ch. | Burtonswood Bossy Boots | St. Bernard | Working | Marjorie Hindes | |
| 1975 | Ch. | Brookewire Brandy of Layven | Wire Fox Terrier | Terrier | Mr Giuseppe Benelli and Mr Paolo Dondini | |
| 1976 | Ch. | Dianthus Buttons | West Highland White Terrier | Terrier | Mrs Kath Newstead & Mrs Dorothy Taylor | |
| 1977 | Sh Ch. | Bournehouse Dancing Master | English Setter | Gundog | Mr Gordon F Williams | |
| 1978 | Ch. | Harrowhill Huntsman | Wire Fox Terrier | Terrier | Miss Evelyn Howles | |
| 1979 | Eng Am Ch. | Callaghan of Leander | Kerry Blue Terrier | Terrier | Wendy Streatfield | |
| 1980 | Ch. | Shargleam Blackcap | Retriever (Flat Coated) | Gundog | Pat Chapman | |
| 1981 | Ch. | Astley Portia of Rua | Irish Setter | Gundog | Colette and Mary Tuite | |
| 1982 | Ch. | Grayco Hazelnut | Poodle (Toy) | Utility | Mrs Lesley A Howard | |
| 1983 | Ch. | Montravia Kaskarak Hitari | Afghan Hound | Hound | Pauline Gibbs | |
| 1984 | Ch. | Saxonsprings Hackensack | Lhasa Apso | Utility | Jean Blyth | |
| 1985 | Ch. | Montravia Tommy-Gun | Poodle (Standard) | Utility | Mrs Marita Gibbs | |
| 1986 | Ch. | Ginger Xmas Carol | Airedale Terrier | Terrier | Miss Alessendra Sommi-Livraghi | |
| 1987 | Ch. | Viscount Grant | Afghan Hound | Hound | Mr Chris and Mrs Julie Amoo | |
| 1988 | Sh Ch. | Starlite Express at Valsett | English Setter | Gundog | Mr Joe W and Mrs Val Watkin | |
| 1989 | Ch. | Potterdale Classic of Moonhill | Bearded Collie | Pastoral | Brenda White | |
| 1990 | Ch. | Olac Moon Pilot | West Highland White Terrier | Terrier | Mr Derek Tattersall | |
| 1991 | Sh Ch. | Raycrofts Socialite | Clumber Spaniel | Gundog | Mr Ralph Dunne | |
| 1992 | Ch. | Pencloe Dutch Gold | Whippet | Hound | Morag Bolton-Lockhart | |
| 1993 | Sh Ch. | Danaway Debonair | Irish Setter | Gundog | Jackie Lorrimer | |
| 1994 | Ch. | Purston Hit and Miss From Brocolitia | Welsh Terrier | Terrier | Mrs A. Maughan | |
| 1995 | Sh Ch. | Starchelle Chicago Bear | Irish Setter | Gundog | Mrs Rachel Shaw-Rainey and Mr Tony Rainey | |
| 1996 | Sh Ch. | Canigou Cambrai | English Cocker Spaniel | Gundog | Tricia Bentley | |
| 1997 | Ch. | Ozmilion Mystification | Yorkshire Terrier | Toy | Osman Sameja | |
| 1998 | Ch. | Saredon Forever Young | Welsh Terrier | Terrier | Judith Averis | |
| 1999 | Sh Ch. | Caspians Intrepid | Irish Setter | Gundog | Jackie Lorimer | |
| 2000 | Ch. | Torums Scarf Michael | Kerry Blue Terrier | Terrier | Mr Ron Ramsay | |
| 2001 | Ch. | Jethard Cidevant | Basenji | Hound | Mr Paul Singleton | |
| 2002 | Nord Ch. (Note: The abbreviation Nord Ch. stands for Nordic Champion, which is awarded to a dog with a championship title from three different Nordic countries.) | Topscore Contradiction | Poodle (Standard) | Utility | Mr S and Mrs K Glenna | |
| 2003 | Ch. | Yakee A Dangerous Liaison | Pekingese | Toy | Mr Easdon and Mr Martin | |
| 2004 | Ch. | Cobyco Call the Tune | Whippet | Hound | Mrs L Yacoby-Wright | |
| 2005 | Am Ch/Ch. | Cracknor Cause Celebre | Norfolk Terrier | Terrier | Elizabeth Matell, Pam Beale and Stephanie Ingram | |
| 2006 | Am Ch. | Caitland Isle Take a Chance | Australian Shepherd | Pastoral | Nancy Resetar | |
| 2007 | Ch/Am Ch. | Araki Fabulous Willy | Tibetan Terrier | Utility | Mr John Shaw and Mr Neil Smith | |
| 2008 | Ch. | Jafrak Philippe Olivier | Giant Schnauzer | Working | Mr and Mrs Cullen | |
| 2009 | Ch. | Efbe's Hidalgo at Goodspice | Sealyham Terrier | Terrier | Marjorie Good | |
| 2010 | Sh Ch/Aust Ch. (Note: The abbreviation Aust Ch. stands for Australian Champion.) | Hungargunn Bear It'n Mind | Hungarian Vizsla | Gundog | Mrs N and Mrs K Craggs and Armstrong | |
| 2011 | Sh Ch. | Vbos The Kentuckian | Retriever (Flat-Coated) | Gundog | Jim Irvine | |
| 2012 | Ch. | Zentarr Elizabeth | Lhasa Apso | Utility | Margaret Anderson | |
| 2013 | Ch. | Soletrader Peek A Boo | Petit Basset Griffon Vendéen | Hound | Sara Robertson and Wendy Doherty | |
| 2014 | Ch/Am Ch. | Afterglow Maverick Sabre | Poodle (Standard) | Utility | Jason Lynn, John Stone and Sandra Stone | |
| 2015 | Ch. | McVan's To Russia With Love | Scottish Terrier | Terrier | M L Khenkina | |
| 2016 | Ch. | Burneze Geordie Girl | West Highland White Terrier | Terrier | Marie Burns | |
| 2017 | Sh Ch. | Afterglow Miami Ink | American Cocker Spaniel | Gundog | Jason Lynn and R Da Silva | |
| 2018 | Ch. | Collooney Tartan Tease | Whippet | Hound | David and Yvette Short | |
| 2019 | Akc/Se/Hr/Pl/Fr Ch. | Planet Waves Forever Young Daydream Believers | Papillon | Toy | K. Roosens & J. Goessens | |
| 2020 | Ch. | Silvae Trademark | Wire-haired Dachshund | Hound | D. McCalmont and K. McCalmont | |
| 2021 | Competition not held due to the COVID-19 pandemic. | | | | | |
| 2022 | Int Ch/Nord Ch/Dan Ch/Norw Ch. | Almanza Backseat Driver | Retriever (Flat Coated) | Gundog | R. Ulin and P. Oware | |
| 2023 | Am Gch. | Kan Trace Very Cheeky Chic | Lagotto Romagnolo | Gundog | S. Zdunic Sinkovic and A. Lucin | |
| 2024 | Ch. | Brighttouch Drift The Line Through Dialynne | Australian Shepherd | Pastoral | M. Raymond, J. Shaw and K. Kirtley | |
| 2025 | Intl Ch. | Una Donna Che Conta | Whippet | Hound | A. Corradini | |
| 2026 | Sh Ch. | Vanitonia Soloist | Clumber Spaniel | Gundog | L. A. S. Cox | |

=== Most successful breeds ===
As of 2026

| Number of wins | Breeds |
|---|---|
| 7 | English Cocker Spaniel |
| 4 | Irish Setter, Standard Poodle, Welsh Terrier, Whippet |
| 3 | English Setter, Flat Coated Retriever, German Shepherd, Greyhound, Labrador Retriever, West Highland White Terrier, Wire Fox Terrier |
| 2 | Afghan Hound, Airedale Terrier, Australian Shepherd, Clumber Spaniel, Kerry Blue Terrier, Lakeland Terrier, Lhasa Apso, Pointer, Scottish Terrier, Toy Poodle |
| 1 | American Cocker Spaniel, Basenji, Bearded Collie, Bulldog, Bull Terrier, Cavalier King Charles Spaniel, Chow Chow, Dalmatian, Giant Schnauzer, Great Dane, Hungarian Vizsla, Irish Wolfhound, Keeshond, Lagotto Romagnolo, Norfolk Terrier, Papillon, Pekingese, Petit Basset Griffon Vendéen, Pyrenean Mountain Dog, Sealyham Terrier, St. Bernard, Tibetan Terrier, Wire-haired Dachshund, Yorkshire Terrier |

=== Most successful groups ===
As of 2026

| Number of wins | Groups |
|---|---|
| 27 | Gundog |
| 22 | Terrier |
| 13 | Utility |
| 13 | Hound |
| 6 | Pastoral |
| 5 | Working |
| 4 | Toy |

== See also ==
- List of Best in Show winners of the Westminster Kennel Club Dog Show
- List of individual dogs

== Sources cited ==
- Smith, A. Croxton (1909). Everyman's Book of the Dog. London: Hodder and Staunton.
- Jackson, Frank (1990). Crufts: The Official History. London: Pelham Books. ISBN 0-7207-1889-9.
- Bengton, Bo (July 2008). Best in Show. Freehold, New Jersey: Kennel Club Books. ISBN 978-1-933958-17-0.
- "Digital Crufts Edition". Dogworld. 2010.
