= Araki Fabulous Willy =

Show dog

Ch/Am Ch. Araki Fabulous Willy
- Willy after winning the Crufts competition (2007)
- Other name: Willy
- Species: Canis lupus familiaris
- Breed: Tibetan Terrier
- Born: 25 April 2001
- Died: 4 December 2008 (aged 7)
- Occupation: Show dog
- Title: Best in Show at Crufts
- Term: 2007–2008
- Predecessor: Am Ch. Caitland Isle Take a Chance (Australian Shepherd)
- Successor: Ch. Jafrak Philippe Olivier (Giant Schnauzer)
- Owners: John Shaw and Neil Smith

Ch/Am Ch. Araki Fabulous Willy (25 April 2001 – 4 December 2008), also known as Willy, was a male Tibetan Terrier who won the title of Best in Show at Crufts in 2007. He was also the top of his breed in the UK for four years consecutively, and the top of the Utility group in 2003. Willy was the most successful of his breed of all time in the UK. Willy has several descendants still living in the UK, including Levi Newman and Frankie and Benny Mattey of North London Patches Pemberton-Billing of West Sussex and Kevin of Chester.

== Early life ==
Owned by John Shaw and Neil Smith from Gloucester, Willy was bred by Ken Sinclair. He was born on 25 April 2001.

== Show history ==
At Crufts between 2004 and 2006, Willy won the title of Best of Breed each time, and placed third in the Utility Group in 2006, winning the group in 2004. After winning Best in Show at the Birmingham National Dog Show in 2006, Willy became the most successful Tibetan Terrier of all time in the UK, having amassed 40 challenge certificates, breaking a record which had stood since 1970.

In 2007 at the age of six years, Willy qualified for Crufts and took first place in the Utility Group after winning its own breed group. Willy went on to take the title of Best in Show, the runner up in the final was a Wire Fox Terrier named Ch. Travella Show Stopper, and was judged by Zena Thorn-Andrews. Owner John Shaw said of the victory, "It is unbelievable. This dog has done so well. It is the biggest accolade you could wish for. We may think about retiring him now because there is nothing left to do."

Claire Balding was the presenter of the Cruft's coverage for the BBC, and her dog Archie was the grandson of Willy. Another of Willy's grandsons, Notoriety Moonwalker at Tetsimi, took first place in the class of Special Junior – Dog in 2009. Following his victory at Crufts, Willy attended the re-launch of the Purple Hotel at Birmingham Star City, after it was rebranded from being named the Sleep Inn Hotel. He was retired after his win, and did not compete in the following year's Crufts. His breeder Ken Sinclair said that he was busy "playing with his girlfriend and digging up holes in the orchard".

Willy had been the top Tibetan Terrier in the UK for four consecutive years, and in 2003 became the only Tibetan Terrier to be the highest ranked of the Utility Group. He died on 4 December 2008, from a severe kidney infection.

He was breed leader in the Dog World/Pedigree Petfoods Top Dog competition in 2004 and was also Top Utility and fourth overall all breeds. He was also breed leader in 2006

Although used sparingly at stud, he was the breed's Top Stud Dog in the Dog World/Pedigree Petfoods competition in 2006, and again in 2007.

His final tally of wins was 45 CCs and 15 groups.

== See also ==
- List of individual dogs
