= Vbos The Kentuckian =

Sh Ch. Vbos the Kentuckian
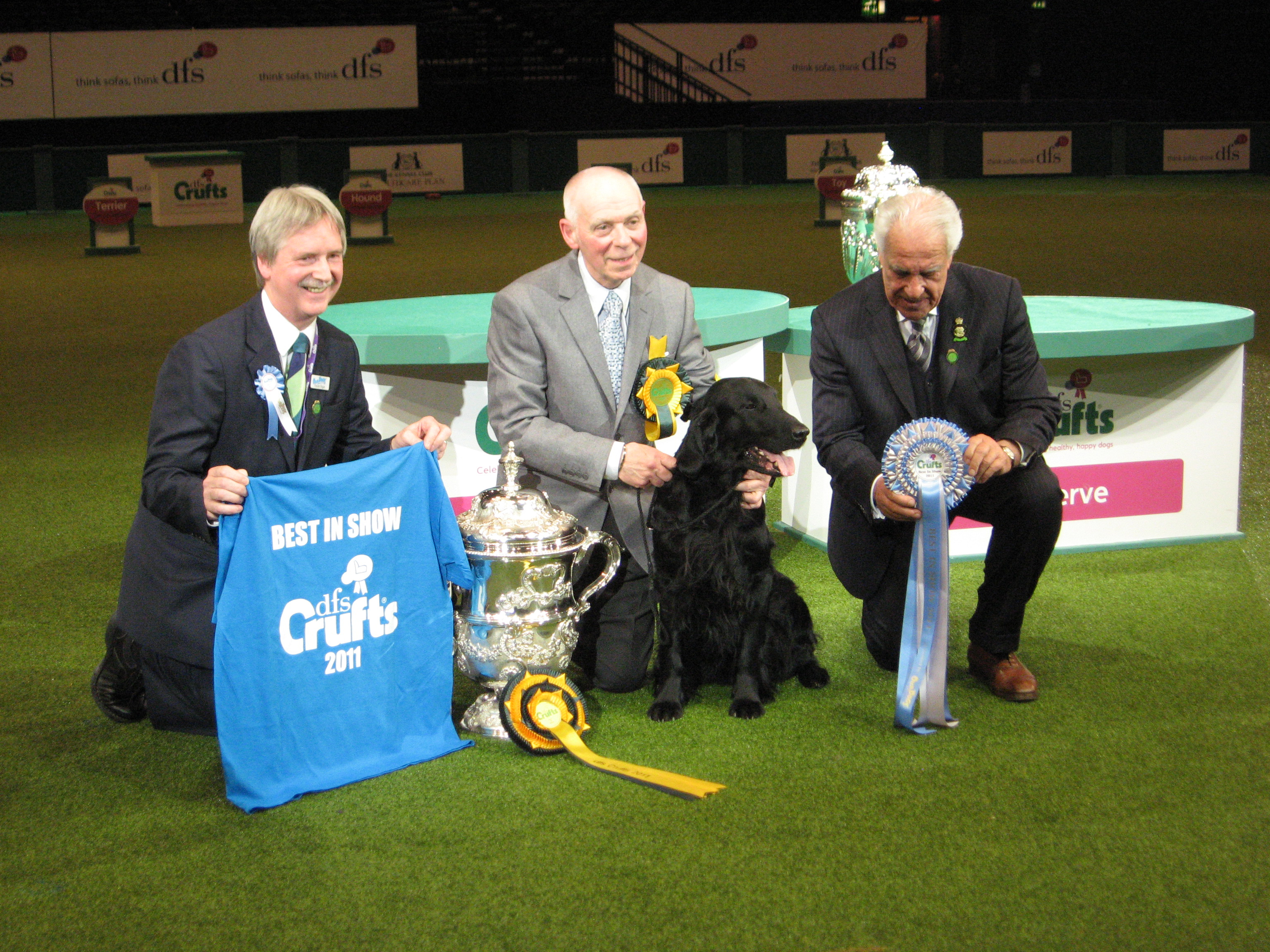
- Sh Ch. Vbos The Kentuckian, after winning Best in Show at Crufts in 2011
- Other name: Jet
- Species: Canis lupus familiaris
- Breed: Flat-Coated Retriever
- Sex: Male
- Born: 30 August 2001; South Queensferry, Edinburgh, Scotland
- Died: 3 June 2013 (aged 11)
- Occupation: Show dog
- Title: Best In Show at Crufts (2011)
- Predecessor: Sh Ch/Aust Ch. Hungargunn Bear It'n Mind
- Successor: Ch. Zentarr Elizabeth
- Owner: Jim Irvine
- Parents: The Sorcerer's Apprentice From Jaeva (sire); Sh Ch. VBOS Lady From Louisiana (dam)

Sh Ch. Vbos the Kentuckian (30 August 2001 – 3 June 2013), also known as Jet, was a Flat-Coated Retriever show dog, bred and handled by Jim Irvine, who won Best in Show at Crufts in 2011 aged 9 years and 7 months, becoming the oldest dog to do so. He was descended from the 1980 Best in Show winner, Ch. Shargleam Blackcap, and placed Best in Show at several other shows around the UK including the Gundog Society of Wales and the National Gundog Association.

== Early life ==
Bred by his owner Jim Irvine from South Queensferry, Edinburgh in Scotland. Jet was line-bred across five generations from Ch. Shargleam Blackcap, the Best in Show winner at Crufts in 1980. Jet was owned by Jim Irvine, having previously been co-owned by Jock Ross and Irvine until Ross' death in 2003. Jet was a family pet to Mr Ross' son. Jet was euthanized at almost 12 years of age on 3 June 2013 after being unwell for a couple of days. He was suffering irreversible respiratory problems.

== Show histories ==
In 2009, Jet was Best in Show at the Northern England Flatcoated Retriever Association, the Gundog Society of Wales, the National Gundog Association and the East of England Championship show. He also placed reserve Best in Show at the Paignton dog show, and a challenge certificate (CC) at five other shows including Best of Breed at the Scottish Kennel Club show.

He was Top Gundog 2010 and placed 10th overall in the Dog World (newspaper) / Arden Grange competition.

Jet won 38 CCs, 33 Best of Breeds and 11 Reserve CCs.

At the Scottish Kennel Club in May 2011, Jet was awarded his 64th CC, setting a new breed CC record; these were awarded by 61 different judges during an eight consecutive year period. This was his 15th group win. He was then awarded his third all-breeds BIS by Mike Gadsby. He was retired from all show competition after this show.

=== Crufts ===
Following a reserve placement in 2004 in the Graduate Dog category for his breed, Jet won a commended award in the Limit Dog category in 2005, in 2006 he placed reserve in the Open Dog category. He won the Reserve Dog Challenge Certificate, after placing second in the Open Dog category in 2007, with the winner of the category, SUCH/NUCH Almanza Far & Flyg, winning Best of Breed.

Jet won Best of Breed at Crufts in 2008, but did not place in the group with the Gundog Group going to the American Cocker Spaniel Sh Ch/Am Ch. San Jo's Born To Party. In 2010, Jet took the Open Dog category and the Reserve Dog Challenge Certificate, with Best of Breed going to Ch. Ballyriver Mackenzie owned by Ms C A Young.

In 2011, Jet was entered against 21,422 other dogs at the Birmingham NEC for Crufts, in the show's 120th year. Following his win in the Gundog Group, Jet qualified for Best in Show for the first time at Crufts. In the Best in Show round, Jet faced off against a Boxer from the Working Group, a German Shepherd from the Pastoral Group and a Wire Fox Terrier from the Terrier Group. Additionally, two dogs joined the round from group judging held earlier on the day; a Standard Poodle from the Utility Group named Ch. Vicmars Rave On (a.k.a. Theo), and a Bichon Frise which won the Toy Group.

Reserve Best in Show went to Ch. Soletrader Peek A Boo.

== Pedigree ==
Ch. Shargleam Blackcap
Ch. Shargleam Kestrel
Ch. Shargleam Water Pipit
Sh Ch. Shiredale Magic&Mystery At Wistosa
Sh Ch. Wizardwood Black Magic Of Shiredale
The Sorcerer's Apprentice From Jaeva
Fossdyke Illustrious
Fossdyke Keepsake Of Jaeva
Shardik Dove Of Fossdyke
Sh Ch. Vbos the Kentuckian
Sh Ch. Kenjo Black Mark
Sh Ch. Branchalwood Strathfinnan
Sh Ch. Branchalwood Fionnlighe
Sh Ch. Vbos Lady From Louisiana
Sh Ch. Kenjo Black Mark
Sh Ch. Fine Fashion Of Dravidian
Sh Ch. Gayplume Dixie
