= McVan's To Russia With Love =

- Other name: Knopa
- Species: Canis lupus familiaris
- Breed: Scottish Terrier
- Sex: Female
- Born: 2 June 2009 (age 17)
- Title: Best in Show at Crufts (2015)
- Predecessor: Ch. Afterglow Maverick Sabre (Standard Poodle)
- Successor: Ch. Burneze Geordie Girl (West Highland White Terrier)
- Owner: Mariana Khenkina

McVan's To Russia With Love (born 2 June 2009), also known as Knopa, is a female Scottish Terrier show dog owned by Mariana Khenkina. She won Best in Show at Crufts in 2015, one of the most prestigious dog shows in the world.

Knopa has achieved success in numerous dog shows across several countries and holds championship titles from Russia, the United States, and others. At Crufts 2015, she was handled by Rebecca Cross, who had been campaigning her in the United States. In February of that year, Knopa also won Best of Breed at the Westminster Kennel Club Dog Show in New York City.

== Background ==
Knopa was bred by Vandra Huber and her husband, Michael Krolewski, in the Pacific Northwest region of the United States. Born on 2 June 2009, she is the offspring of Land Rose JP All Right—an International, Japanese, and American Champion—and McVan's Fire Starter, an American Champion. At three months old, Knopa was exported to Russia to live with her owner, Marina Khenkina, under the condition that she would later return to the United States to be shown with the goal of earning her American conformation title.

== Crufts ==
Knopa was selected as the winner of the Terrier Group by judge Michael Phillips, after being declared Best of Breed among Scottish Terriers by breed judge Geoff Corish. On the final day of the competition, 8 March 2015, she competed against the other six group winners: a male Flat-Coated Retriever from Sweden, a male Maltese from Italy, a Bearded Collie, an Alaskan Malamute, a Saluki, and a female Miniature Poodle from Norway.

The judge for Best in Show was Ronnie Irving, who awarded Knopa the top prize. The Flat-Coated Retriever was named Reserve Best in Show. All three judges involved in the final—Corish, Phillips, and Irving—are recognized experts in terrier breeds.

Knopa was the first Scottish Terrier to win Best in Show at Crufts since 1929. Her American handler, Rebecca Cross, stated that the dog would likely be retired from competition following this win. Prior to the show, Cross had been informed in writing by The Kennel Club that the American method of lifting terriers—by the neck and tail—was prohibited in the UK. However, she lifted Knopa using this method during the event and later issued an apology.

== Show career ==
Knopa was first exhibited at Crufts in 2013, where she was also awarded Best of Breed. On that occasion, she was handled by her owner, Mariana Khenkina. In February 2015, Knopa was judged Best of Breed at the Westminster Kennel Club Dog Show in New York City.
