= Hungargunn Bear It'n Mind =

Hungarian Vizsla (2002–2012)

Sh Ch/Aust Ch. Hungargunn Bear It'n Mind
- Other names: Yogi
- Species: Canis lupus familiaris
- Breed: Hungarian Vizsla
- Sex: Male
- Born: 22 December 2002
- Died: 10 December 2012 (aged 9)
- Occupation: Show dog
- Title: Best In Show at Crufts (2010)
- Predecessor: Ch. Efbe's Hidalgo at Goodspice
- Successor: Sh Ch. Vbos The Kentuckian
- Parents: Aus Ch. Hubertus Dealers Choice (sire); Aus Ch. Hungargunn Unforgettable (dam)
- Awards: 63 CC's, 18 best in show all breeds

Sh Ch/Aust Ch. Hungargunn Bear It'n Mind (22 December 2002 – 10 December 2012), also known as Yogi, was a male Hungarian Vizsla who was the Best in Show at Crufts in 2010. He was the record holder for Best in Show victories at all breed championship shows in the UK, having gained 18 of these awards, breaking the record in 2010 which had previously stood for eighty years; this was subsequently beaten in September 2014.

== Early life ==
Yogi, who went by the show name of Hungargunn Bear It'n Mind, was bred by Mrs Naomi Cragg of Sydney, Australia. His sire was Australia Grand Champion Hubertus Dealers Choice, and dam was Aust. Ch Hungargunn Unforgettable. He was first brought to the UK from Australia in 2004.

== Show histories ==
=== Crufts ===
Yogi was entered in Crufts in 2009 in the Open Dog category of his breed. He won the class and took both the Best of Breed title and Gun dog group titles. A Sealyham Terrier named Ch. Efbe's Hidalgo At Goodspice went on to win Best in Show with a Standard Poodle taking the reserve prize. The other finalists were a Pharaoh Hound, an Old English Sheepdog, a Boxer and a Papillon.

In 2010 nearly 22,000 dogs across 187 breeds were entered in the competition. Yogi won the Gun dog group although the judging was delayed by a streaker. Later the same day he was crowned best in show, becoming the first Hungarian Vizsla to do so. The Scottish Terrier Ch. Rus/Slo/Eur Filisite Brash Celebration, aka Rico, from Russia took second prize and other competitors in the best in show class included a Rottweiler, a Welsh Corgi, and the same Pharaoh Hound from the previous year.

=== Other shows ===
==== Australia ====
Yogi placed second in the Intermediate Dog class of the Hungarian Vizsla Club of New South Wales' Easter Championship Show held on 27 March 2005 with Ch. Iceana Gold Point placing first in the group. Yogi was described by judge Mrs Jackie Perkins of Gardenway Vizslas in the UK as "Another lovely dog with lots to like about him. Beautiful head and expression, well proportioned with good front and rear, stood over ground well. Hard decision but handler tended to over-extend him and I just preferred the overall picture of the winner."

==== United Kingdom ====
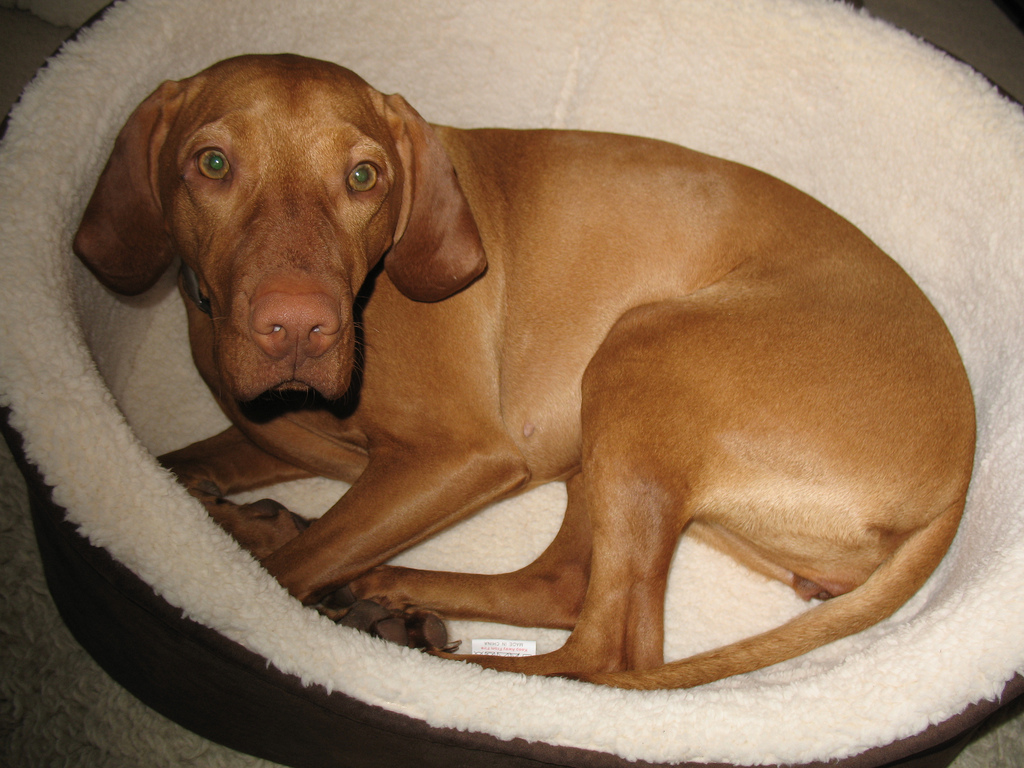
Amber, daughter of Hungargunn Bear It'n Mind.

In 2007 he took best in show at the Darlington Dog Show Society's Championship Show held near Ripon, North Yorkshire. Following his successes in 2007 he was one of 25 Champion finalists to be invited to the 29th Pedigree Petfoods Stakes Final, held in February 2008 at the Birmingham NEC in England. He placed third overall, with first going to Ch/Am Ch. Afterglow The Big Tease, a Standard Poodle and second place went to Ch Lux Dutch Ch. Waterley Dressed to Impress, a Tibetan Terrier. Other shows in 2008 he placed in included in a final place in Boston, a best in show at Manchester and Richmond, and reserve at the Southern Counties show, also at South Wales, Leeds, Belfast and at Windsor, Berkshire.

In 2008 he placed second at the Welsh Kennel Club Championship. Following a ruling by the Kennel Club on 18 March 2010 his handler for the event, Moray Armstrong, was deemed to have threatened the breed judge. The committee disqualified Mr Armstrong from attending, taking part in, or judging any Kennel Club events for a year in addition to a fine of £500 and costs of £1,210.

At the National Dog Show held 7–10 May 2009 he took reserve with Ch. Fairweather's Knock Out with Brooklynbear, a Newfoundland taking best in show. Following his victory at the Manchester show in 2010, he broke the record for most best in show victories at all breed championship shows. The record had previously stood for eighty years since the 1930s when previous Crufts winner Scottish Terrier Ch. Heather Necessity held the record at 16 victories. A Wire Fox Terrier, Ch Travella Striking Steel, (whose pet name is Oliver), became the new record holder after securing his nineteenth best in show award at Driffield championship show in September 2014.

His show record in the UK has resulted in him being Top Dog all breeds UK in the Dog World (newspaper) / Pedigree Petfoods competition in 2006, 2007 and fourth in 2008. In 2009 he placed seventh. He was Top Stud Dog all breeds in the Dog World (newspaper) / Royal Canin competitions in 2009 and 2010.

Yogi died in his sleep on 10 December 2012, two weeks short of his tenth birthday.

== Stud service ==
Yogi commanded fees of up to £750 a litter and brought in almost £60,000 from 79 litters. In the five years since he moved to England he fathered 525 puppies, which was more than 10% of all Vizsla puppies registered in the same period. This heavy use of a stud dog (see popular sire effect) has raised concern by some about potential health issues caused by a narrowing gene pool.
