= Afterglow Maverick Sabre =

Show dog

- Other name: Ricky
- Species: Canis lupus familiaris
- Breed: Poodle (Standard)
- Sex: Male
- Born: 4 September 2011 (age 15)
- Title: Best In Show at Crufts (2014)
- Predecessor: Ch. Soletrader Peek A Boo (Petit Basset Griffon Vendéen)
- Successor: McVan's To Russia With Love (Scottish Terrier)
- Owners: Jason Lynn and John and Sandra Stone, later transferred to Ilaria Biondi de Ciabatti

Ch./Am. Ch. Afterglow Maverick Sabre (born 4 September 2011), also known as Ricky, is a black Standard Poodle show dog owned at that time by his handler Jason Lynn together with John and Sandra Stone, who won Best in Show at Crufts in 2014. After the win, Ricky's owners stated he would retire from show ring competitions in the UK. He has also had a successful career in America.

== Background ==
At the time of his Crufts success, Ricky was owned by his handler Jason Lynn in partnership with John and Sandra Stone. He was sometime later transferred to the ownership of Ilaria Biondi de Ciabatti. Bred by Jason and his partner Mike Gadsby at their home in Preston, Lancashire, Ricky was born on 4 September 2011. His dam is Ch Topcatana Sugar Cube Afterglow and he was sired by Ch/Am. Ch. Del Zarzosa Salvame from Afterglow, so it was a half brother to half sister mating. Ricky was X-rayed for The Kennel Club/British Veterinary Association Hip dysplasia scheme and has a total score of 10.

Lynn and Gadsby own a kennels at Westby near Blackpool as well as having their team of show dogs. During 2013 they achieved the distinction of having owned or bred 100 UK titleholders from 18 different breeds. Gadsby and Lynn have previously been successful at Crufts, winning Reserve Best in Show in 2009 with another of their Standard Poodles, Afterglow The Big Tease (pet name Donny), who is Ricky's great grandsire and again being awarded Reserve Best in Show at Crufts in 1997 with an American Cocker Spaniel, Sh Ch Boduf Pistols At Dawn with Afterglow (pet name Dexter).

== Crufts ==
Crufts 2014 drew an entry of 21,564 dogs, a five per cent increase on the previous year and the highest number of competitors for four years. Ricky was selected as the Utility Group winner by judge Ken Sinclair, having been declared the best Standard Poodle competing by the breed judge Albert Wight. On the final day, 9 March 2014, Ricky challenged against the other six group winners. These were a Samoyed, a Wire Fox Terrier, an Irish Wolfhound, a Pomeranian, a Rottweiler and the only female group winner in the final, an American Cocker Spaniel. The judge for Best in show was Jack Bispham and after choosing Ricky as his overall winner, Bispham selected the Samoyed as Reserve Best in Show.

When the American Cocker Spaniel, Sh Ch. Afterglow Pearl's A Singer, owned by Suzy Crummey and Lynn but bred by Gadsby and Lynn, was awarded the Gundog Group earlier on the final day, it was the first time a breeder has bred two different group winners at the same Crufts.

After the show Lynn commented: "we decided that this would be his last show — and he has ended it in the most wonderful way possible." Gadsby said that the black Poodle was “a regular dog that we can take to the park and let off the lead”. The decision to retire Ricky from UK competitions was confirmed by Lynn.

== Show career ==
As a puppy during 2012 Ricky won two reserve Challenge Certificates (CCs) and qualified for the Purina/Dog World Pup of the Year competition, at the final of which he was included in the last six competitors. He was awarded his first CC at the Welsh Kennel Club championship show and his second came from the Crufts utility group judge Ken Sinclair at the City of Birmingham show. His third CC, which entitles him to be called a Champion was won at a breed club show.

At the beginning of 2013 Ricky was exhibited in America where he was Best of Winners at a Poodle club specialty. He secured his American Champion title when he returned to the States to compete at the Eukanuba World Challenge and attended shows held during a weekend in mid December 2013. He also triumphed as the overall winner of the Eukanuba Challenge. In the UK during 2013 Ricky won five Best in Show awards, three reserve BIS awards and 12 groups at all breed championship shows. He was the overall winner of the UK Top Dog all breeds in the points competition for last year.

Ricky attended the Poodle Club of America show in April 2014 and afterwards travelled to Peru to be exhibited in South America.

== Pedigree ==
Ch./Am. Ch. Afterglow The Big Tease
Ch./Am. Ch. Afterglow Sugar Daddy
Ch. Kevlain Faith In Your Dreams
Ch Del Zarzosa Salvame from Afterglow
It. Ch. Piedmont How About That
Del Zarzoso Voce Abusou
Del Zarzosa Soy Yo of Panizzi
Ch./Am. Ch. Afterglow Maverick Sabre
Ch./Am. Ch. Afterglow The Big Tease
Ch./Am. Ch. Afterglow Sugar Daddy
Ch. Kevlain Faith In Your Dreams
Ch Topcatana Sugar Cube Afterglow
NZ Ch. Pinafore Passport
Ch. Topcatana Sweet Chariot
Kertellas Anastacia
