= Jafrak Philippe Olivier =

Show dog

Ch. Jafrak Philippe Olivier
- Other name: Philip
- Species: Canis lupus familiaris
- Breed: Giant Schnauzer
- Sex: Male
- Born: 3 April 2001
- Died: September 2013 (aged 12)
- Occupation: Show dog
- Title: Best In Show at Crufts
- Term: 2008-09
- Predecessor: Ch/Am Ch. Araki Fabulous Willy (Tibetan Terrier)
- Successor: Ch. Efbe's Hidalgo At Goodspice (Sealyham Terrier)
- Owners: Kevin and Sandie Cullen
- Parents: Luther King Du Bujol (sire); Jafrak Dolcelata (dam)

Ch. Jafrak Philippe Olivier, (April 3, 2001 – September 2013), also known as Philip, was a male Giant Schnauzer who won the title of Best In Show at Crufts in 2008. He had previously won the Working Group in 2004 and 2005.

== Show history ==
Philip was bred by Jack and Frances Krall and whelped on 3 April 2001. He was owned by Kevin and Sandie Cullen from St Leonards-on-Sea.

Philip was sired by the multiple champion French dog Luther King Du Bujol and came from a litter of three puppies. His dam was also a champion and her registered name was Jafrak Dolcelata. His show career started with a best puppy in show win at the Northern Schnauzer Club and he achieved his first challenge certificate at 11 months of age at the Schnauzer Club of Great Britain where he also secured "Best in Show" after beating the best of breed winners in the other Schnauzer sizes. Three challenge certificates are required to entitle a dog to be called a "Champion" under The Kennel Club rules.

When Philip was 16 months old, he was awarded his first all-breed championship show group win at Bournemouth championship show in 2002. In 2003, he went on to win the first of his 14 all-breed championship show "Best in Show" awards at Bath. That year his tally of wins meant he became the first Giant Schnauzer to be declared the Top Dog all breeds in the UK.

He won his first Crufts Working Group in 2004, with the Newfoundland Ch. Merrybear Barry White in reserve place. Philip was subsequently ranked the fourth top show dog during 2004. He repeated his Crufts feat during the following year, with the Doberman Pinscher Ch. Talacre Vysans Boy At Supeta JW in reserve. Also in 2005, Philip was named Best in Show at the Scottish Kennel Club Championship Show. He was the second highest ranked show dog in the UK during 2005.

Philip won the Contest of Champions in 2006 and his owners announced he would retire from further competition. However, he came out of retirement at Crufts 2007 where he won best of breed, and reached the Working Group judging round. Stephen Hall awarded him the reserve place in the group; the winner was the Alaskan Malamute Int It/Sp/Sm/Mon/Fin Ch. Giving a New Royal Star.

Three years after his 2005 group win, in 2008 at Crufts, Philip reached the Best in Show round. There he faced the Shiba Inu Ch. Janeryls In The Line Of Fire JW, the Chihuahua Ch. Gibeltarik Happy Go Lucky, the American Cocker Spaniel Sh Ch/Am Ch. San Jo's Born To Party, the Samoyed Ch. Vandreem Imperial Hermioni, the Beagle Ch. Dialynne Maximus and the Soft-coated Wheaten Terrier Am Ch. Caraway Celebrate Life. Because of a large volume of betting on the Samoyed on the first day of the event, bookmakers William Hill suspended all betting on Best in Show. Judge Clare Coxall chose Philip as the winner, and named him Best in Show. The Samoyed was named in reserve place. Coxall described Philip's entrance into the judging ring in particular as he "came out of that arch there and he came in... as though he owned it." He was subsequently named as the Drontal Dog of the Year.

== Legacy and death ==
Philip sired eight litters producing several titleholders including a group winning son; Philip died in September 2013, aged 12 years.

== Pedigree ==
SP Ch. Friper De Pichera
Ital Ch. Stablemaster’s Superman
Fin Ch. Stablemasters Electric Lady
Multi Ch. Luther King Du Bujol
Fr Lux Ch. Harri De Pichera
Illoa Du Bujol
Lux Ch. Europe Du Bujol
Ch. Jafrak Philippe Oliver
Am Ch. Lucas De Campos De Ora
Skansen’s Tortellini at Jafrak
Skansens Swedish Summer
Ch. Jafrak Dolcelata
Int Ch. Skansens Midnight Mozart
Skansen’s Quality at Jafrak
Am Ch. Skansens Mardi Gras
