= Crufts =

International canine event held annually in the United Kingdom

- Formation: 1891
- Founder: Charles Cruft
- Type: Dog show
- Headquarters: Birmingham, England
- Location: United Kingdom
- Website: www.crufts.org.uk

Crufts is an international dog show held annually in the United Kingdom, held since 1891, and organised by the Royal Kennel Club (formerly known as The Kennel Club). It is the largest show of its kind in the world.

Crufts is primarily a championship conformation show for dogs, and includes a large trade show of mainly dog-related goods and services, as well as competitions in dog agility, obedience, flyball and heelwork to music. Winner of the annual Friends for Life competition which celebrates unsung canine heroes is also announced, and Crufts also hosts the final of Scruffts, a crossbreed competition. It is held over four days (Thursday to Sunday) in early March at the National Exhibition Centre (NEC) in Solihull, England.

Crufts comprises a number of separate competitions. The main competition is for the Best in Show award, which is hotly contested by dogs and their owners from throughout the world.

The BBC programme Pedigree Dogs Exposed accused the club of allowing breed standards, judging standards and breeding practices to compromise the health of purebred dogs. The programme led various sponsors to withdraw. The BBC dropped Crufts 2009 from their coverage after being unable to agree to terms with the club, with Channel 4 broadcasting the event since 2010.

== History ==
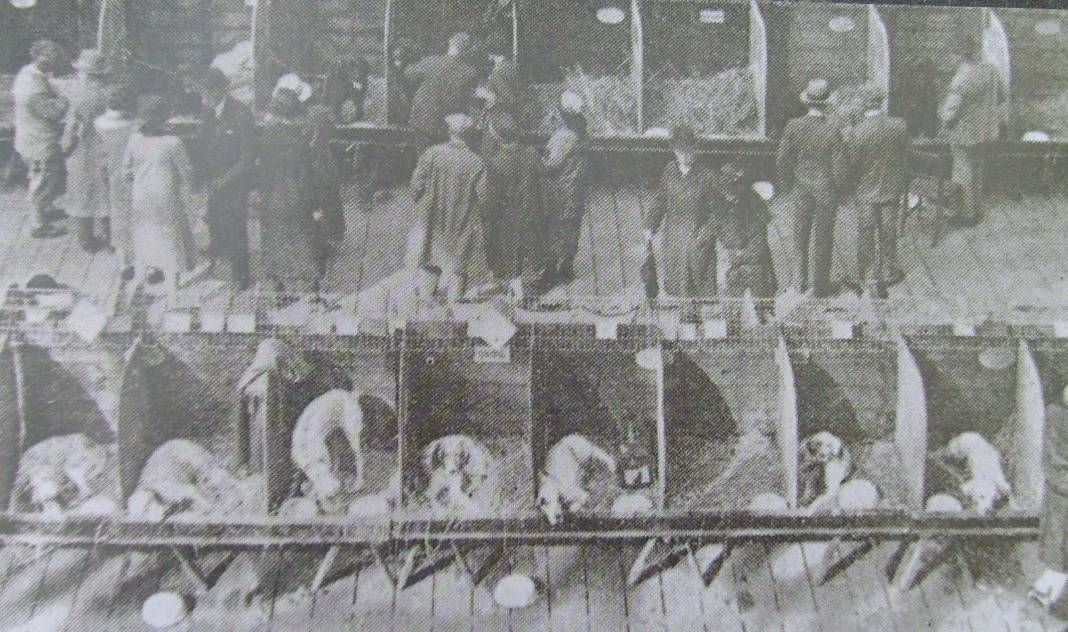
Crufts exhibition 1891

Crufts was named after its founder, Charles Cruft, who worked as general manager for a dog biscuit manufacturer, travelling to dog shows both in the United Kingdom and internationally, which allowed him to establish contacts and understand the need for higher standards for dog shows. In 1886, Cruft's first dog show, billed as the "First Great Terrier Show", had 57 classes and 600 entries. The first show named "Crufts"—"Cruft's Greatest Dog Show"—was held at the Royal Agricultural Hall, Islington, in 1891. It was the first at which all breeds were invited to compete, with around 2,000 dogs and almost 2,500 entries.

With the close of the 19th century, entries had risen to over 3,000, including royal patronage from various European countries and Russia. Due to the First World War, the show was not held between 1918 and 1920. In 1928, the Best In Show class was introduced and awarded to a Greyhound named Primley Sceptre, shown by Herbert Whitley, the founder of what is now Paignton Zoo. In 1934, the competition was sponsored by a cat food manufacturer. In 1936, "The Jubilee Show" had 10,650 entries with the number of breeds totalling 80. The show continued annually and gained popularity each year until Charles' death in 1938. His widow then ran the show for four years, until she felt unable to do so due to its high demands of time and effort. To ensure the future and reputation of the show (and, of course, her husband's work), she sold it to The Kennel Club in 1942.

The show was again interrupted, by the Second World War, and consequently the 1948 show was the first to be held under the new owner, at Olympia in London. The show continued to gain popularity with each passing year. The BBC first televised the show in 1950. The 1954 competition was cancelled due to an electricians' strike. In 1959, despite an increase in entrance fees, the show set a new world record with 13,211 entrants.

The first Obedience Championships were held in 1955 one year after the electricians’ strike cancellation, the same year working sheepdogs were first allowed to enter. In 1978, agility was introduced as a demonstration, to later become a competition in 1980, with an international invitational competition added in 2001. In 1985, the Young Kennel Club was founded to promote dog handling among younger people. Flyball was introduced in 1990, and in 1992, the first Heelwork to Music demonstration was carried out by Mary Ray. In the early 1990s The Kennel Club started to campaign for responsible dog ownership, with emphasis on people choosing the right dog for them, and introduced Discover Dogs area to Crufts, where visitors can meet all currently recognised breeds and chat to breed experts about dog ownership. In 2000, Rescue Dog Agility was added to the programme.

By 1979, the show had to move to Earls Court exhibition centre, as the increasing number of entries and spectators had outgrown the capacity of its previous venue. Soon, the show had to be changed again – the duration had to be increased to three days in 1982, then in 1987 to four days, as its popularity continued to increase. Since 1991, the show, previously always held in London, has been held in the National Exhibition Centre, Solihull.

At the Centenary celebrations in 1991 Crufts was officially recognised by the Guinness Book of Records as the world's largest dog show, with 22,973 dogs being exhibited in conformation classes that year. Including agility and other events, it is estimated that an average 28,000 dogs take part in Crufts each year, with an estimated 160,000 human visitors attending the show. Crufts was formerly televised by the BBC; this ended after the 2008 event (see "Criticism") and the 2009 event was only shown via the Internet. Since 2010 the show has been broadcast on the commercial channels Channel 4 and More4, attracting over 4.5 million viewers.

In 2021, as a result of the COVID-19 pandemic, Crufts was first postponed, then cancelled for the first time since the electricians' strike of 1954.

The show was held on 10–13 March 2022, 9–12 March 2023, 7-10 March 2024, 6-9 March 2025 and 5-8 March 2026.

The show will be held on 4-7 March 2027.

== Competing for Best in Show ==
Crufts is not an open competition; dogs must have qualified during the previous year. There are a number of ways of qualifying for the breed classes at Crufts, but dogs typically qualify by obtaining first, second or third place in the relevant class at a Kennel Club-affiliated Championship show where Challenge Certificates are awarded, or by achieving Best in Show, Reserve Best in Show or Best Puppy in Show at a Kennel Club-affiliated Open or General show. Dogs can become qualified for life upon attaining their Kennel Club Stud Book Number.

Dogs begin by competing against others of the same breed, split by gender, age and previous class wins. These classes include Veteran, Special Puppy, Special Junior, Yearling, Post Graduate, Mid Limit, Limit, and Open. Each is awarded once for dogs and once for bitches. The dog and bitch class winners then compete again for the Dog and Bitch Challenge Certificate (CC). The two CC winners then go head-to-head to determine the Best of Breed.

After the best of each breed has been chosen, they then compete against the others in their Group (in the UK, there are seven Groups: Toys, Gundogs, Utility, Hounds, Working, Pastoral, and Terriers) to find the Best in Group. The seven Group winners then compete to find the Best in Show and Reserve Best in Show.

Best in Show winners receive a replica of the solid silver Keddell Memorial Trophy, and a small cash prize of £200.

As of 2016 the English Cocker Spaniel had been the most successful breed at Crufts, awarded Best In Show seven times, and the Gundog Group is the most successful group, having produced twenty-three Best In Show winners.

== Best in Show winners (since 2006) ==
Year	Breed	Kennel Club Name	Group
2026	Clumber Spaniel	Vanitonia Soloist	Gundog
2025	Whippet	Una Donna Che Conta	Hound
2024	Australian Shepherd	Ch Brighttouch Drift The Line Through Dialynne	Pastoral
2023	Lagotto Romagnolo	Kan Trace Very Cheeky Chic	Gundog
2022	Retriever (flat coated)	Almanza Backseat Driver	Gundog
2020	Wire-haired Dachshund	Ch Silvae Trademark	Hound
2019	Papillon	Akc/Se/Hr/Pl/Fr Ch Planet Waves Forever Young Daydream Believers	Toy
2018	Whippet	Ch Collooney Tartan Tease	Hound
2017	American Cocker Spaniel	Sh Ch Afterglow Miami Ink	Gundog
2016	West Highland White Terrier	Ch Burneze Geordie Girl	Terrier
2015	Scottish Terrier	Rus/Blr/Ukr/Cro/Lit/Lat/Est/Balt/Slo/Pl/Am Ch McVan's To Russia With Love	Terrier
2014	Poodle (Standard)	Ch/Am Ch Afterglow Maverick Sabre	Utility
2013	Petit Basset Griffon Vendéen	Ch Soletrader Peek A Boo	Hound
2012	Lhasa Apso	Ch Zentarr Elizabeth	Utility
2011	Retriever (Flat-Coated)	Sh Ch Vbos The Kentuckian	Gundog
2010	Hungarian Vizsla	Sh Ch/Aust Ch Hungargunn Bear It'n Mind	Gundog
2009	Sealyham Terrier	Am/Can/Su Efbe's Hidalgo At Goodspice	Terrier
2008	Giant Schnauzer	Ch Jafrak Philippe Olivier	Working
2007	Tibetan Terrier	Ch & Am Ch Araki Fabulous Willy	Utility
2006	Australian Shepherd	Am Ch Caitland Isle Take A Chance	Pastoral

== Other competitions ==
Crufts hosts a range of other competitions, including agility, obedience and flyball.

Agility is a fast-paced timed competition in which dogs manoeuvre, under guidance from their handlers, through, over, and around various obstacles. Any mistake made is penalised by adding faults to their score. Dogs must qualify during the preceding year to compete in individual or team events, although representative handlers and dogs from England, Wales, Scotland, Northern Ireland and the Republic of Ireland are invited to compete in the International competitions.

Obedience, held in the ‘Obedience Ring’ requires dogs to obey a set of commands given by their handlers, including off-lead heelwork at different paces, distance control, retrieve, send away, stays and scent discrimination. Dogs qualify by being successful at shows during the preceding year to compete in the Dog and Bitch UK Obedience Championships, UK Inter-Regional Team Competition and the crowd's favourite, the Obedience World Cup. The prizes are awarded to the most obedient dog according to the judges. Obreedience is a group version of the activity in which team of four dogs of the same breed compete against other teams in being the most obedient.

Flyball is a relay-style race. Two teams of four dogs compete against each other in a knock-out competition. Each dog jumps a series of four hurdles, and then steps on a box, which is rigged to release a ball. The dog must then return the ball to the start of the course to tag one of its team, who then repeats this process until all the dogs have finished. Teams must qualify during the preceding year.

Crufts also holds both freestyle and heelwork to music competitions, consisting of a choreographed routine, comprising elements of obedience, set to music.

The gamekeepers classes at Crufts focus on judging the suitability of field-bred dogs for use in the field. Dogs entered are of the gundog group, but the conformation of these dogs differs significantly from that of gundogs from show-bred bloodlines, owing to the need for function as a working gundog, and they are judged accordingly.

The Young Royal Kennel Club (YRKC) also has its own ring and stand where handlers aged between six and twenty-five compete in Agility, Obedience, Showing, Handling, Heelwork to Music, Flyball, and Grooming. Handlers and dogs must qualify in their discipline during the preceding year.

Crufts hosts the World Champion Junior Handling competition in which National Best Junior Handler winners from around the globe compete. The first World title competition, held in 1984, was judged by Ger Pederson. The winner of this premiere competition was US representative Tracie Laliberte who had won Westminster Kennel Club in 1983. A unique feature of this first competition was the requirement of switching dogs mid-way through the competition.

== Other attractions ==
Crufts regularly attracts over 160,000 visitors to the NEC and more than 155,000 people visited Crufts in 2020. While the main purpose of the event is the search for the best dog in the show, many trade stands sell a wide range of dog-related merchandise or advertise dog-related charities. Many exhibitors include interactive displays in their stands and demonstration of their product and work, i.e. demonstration of canine first aid.

There is also a section known as Discover Dogs where visitors can see almost every breed recognised by the Royal Kennel Club on view, and discuss each breed with knowledgeable owners.

Crufts also holds special shows and demonstrations, where specially trained dogs perform in front of an arena audience, including Police Dogs, Royal Air Force Dogs and Medical Detection Dogs.

== Crossbreeds ==
As the Royal Kennel Club also registers crossbreeds, Crufts also hosts many competitions and displays for crossbreeds. They mainly compete in agility, obedience and heelwork to music competitions. The popularity of Crufts and the interest of dog owners who do not own purebreeds convinced the club to hold Scruffts, a show similar to Crufts for crossbreed dogs. Scruffts regularly attracts hundreds of entries and dozens of finalists compete for the top prize in a final at Crufts.

== Criticism ==
The Kennel Club was criticised on the August 2008 BBC programme Pedigree Dogs Exposed for allowing breed standards, judging standards and breeding practices which are said to compromise the health of purebred dogs. The programme led various sponsors such as Hill's Pet Nutrition, Royal Society for the Prevention of Cruelty to Animals and Dogs Trust to withdraw from their participation in Crufts and other Kennel Club events. The RSPCA stated that it is "concerned about the unacceptably high levels of disability, deformity and disease affecting pedigree dogs". The BBC dropped Crufts 2009 from its coverage after being unable to agree terms with the club. It was reported that Pedigree Petfoods withdrew from sponsorship of Crufts following this programme, but this announcement was made well in advance of the broadcast and for financial reasons. Kennel Club Chairman Ronnie Irving said that "If this programme teaches us anything, I hope it will teach the 'purists' in some breeds that they simply must get a move on and realise that in these politically correct and well informed days, some old attitudes are simply no longer sustainable." Maintaining that the majority of dogs are healthy he said that "the roughly 90% of us who thankfully have healthy breeds must continue to guard against exaggeration and must bring pressure to bear on the laggards, otherwise we will – all of us – continue to be tarred with the same brush". The club initially defended its practices, and criticised the programme as "highly biased". It also lodged a complaint to regulatory authority Ofcom claiming "unfair treatment and editing".

The club introduced a new health plan, breed standards for every breed went under review, and show judges were required to choose only healthy dogs. It has also requested regulatory powers from the government, which would allow the club to take actions against breeders who do not comply with health standards. New breed standards for 209 dog breeds were announced in January 2009, and became effective immediately, but with breeders allowed until June to object. The new standards were said to "not include anything that could in any way be interpreted as encouraging features that might prevent a dog from breathing, walking and seeing freely". "This will help to prevent the practice of exaggeration, where features that are perceived to be desirable, such as a short muzzle or loose skin, are made more prominent by breeders, and which can have detrimental effects on a dog’s health."

=== RSPCA report ===
In February 2009, the results of an independent scientific report commissioned by the RSPCA concluded that "exaggerated physical features and inherited diseases cause serious welfare problems in pedigree dogs". Quoting Arman (2007), the report states that "Society and sections of the veterinary profession have become 'desensitised to the welfare issues to such an extent that the production of anatomically deformed dogs is neither shocking, nor considered abnormal'". It also states that "Breeding practices and efforts by breed societies and kennel clubs, to date, have been ineffective at protecting the welfare of many breeds of domestic dog" and that "changes in breeding and selection practices are urgently required". The club stated that the report "fails totally to recognise the real steady progress and advance of scientific knowledge that has already been made in the area of pedigree dog health".

== In culture ==
Little Mabel Wins is a children's book by British author Jilly Cooper which features Crufts. The story focuses on Little Mabel and her father who stage a protest against mongrel discrimination at the dog show; he sets off an explosive chocolate-based device which causes chaos. However Mabel is so frightened she sits still and wins an award for good behaviour.

Poppy Holman's play A Dog's Tale, based on Crufts, was commissioned as one of Mikron Theatre Company's two 2020 productions, was delayed by COVID-19, and premiered in Leeds on 5 June 2021.

== See also ==
- Breed groups (dog)
- Catwalk Dogs
- Cultural icon
- Supreme Cat Show
- World Dog Show
