= Flat-coated Retriever =

Flat-Coated Retriever
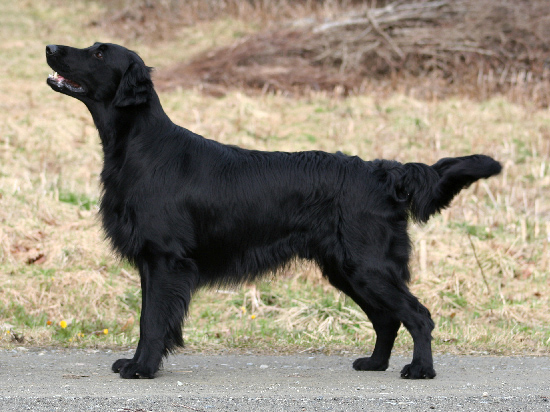
- A black Flat-Coated Retriever
- Common nicknames: Flatcoat, Flattie; Flatte (Sweden), flatt (Sweden)
- Origin: England
Traits
Height	Males	59–61.5 cm (23.2–24.2 in)
	Females	56.5–59 cm (22.2–23.2 in)
Weight	Males	27–36 kg (60–79 lb)
	Females	25–32 kg (55–71 lb)
- Coat: Glossy and smooth
- Colour: Black, liver
- Litter size: 4 - 8 pups
Kennel club standards
- The Kennel Club: standard
- Fédération Cynologique Internationale: standard

The Flat-coated Retriever is a gun dog breed originating from England. It was developed as a retriever both on land and in the water.

== Description ==
=== Appearance ===
The Flat-Coated Retriever breed standard calls for males to be 23–25 in (58–64 cm) tall at the withers, with a recommended weight of 60–80 lb (27–36 kg), and for females to be 22–24 in (56–61 cm), with a recommended weight of 55–75 lb (25–34 kg). The Flat-Coated Retriever has strong muscular jaws and a relatively long muzzle. Its head is unique to the breed and is described as being "of one piece" with a minimal stop and a backskull of about the same length as the muzzle. It has almond-shaped, dark brown eyes with an intelligent, friendly expression. The ears are pendant, relatively small, and lie close to the head. The occiput (the bone at the back of the skull) is not to be accentuated (as it is in setters, for example) with the head flowing smoothly into a well-arched neck. The topline is strong and straight with a well-feathered tail of moderate length held straight off the back. This breed should be well angulated front and rear, allowing for open, effortless movement.

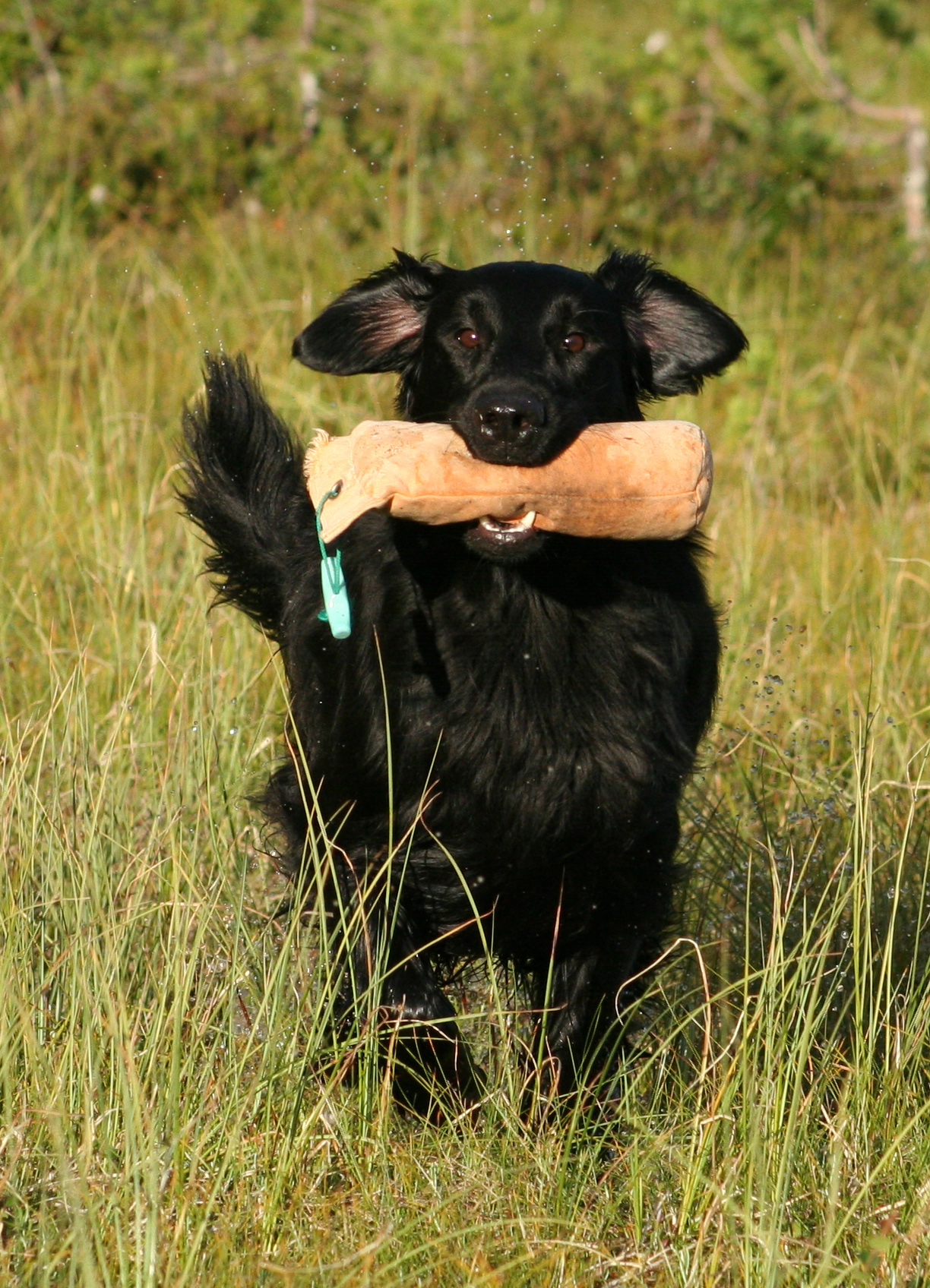
Flat-Coated Retriever holding a gun dog dummy.

The Flat-Coated Retriever comes in three colors – black (most common), liver, and yellow. Although the color yellow is a disqualification in conformation showing, yellow Flat-Coated Retrievers can compete in other venues.

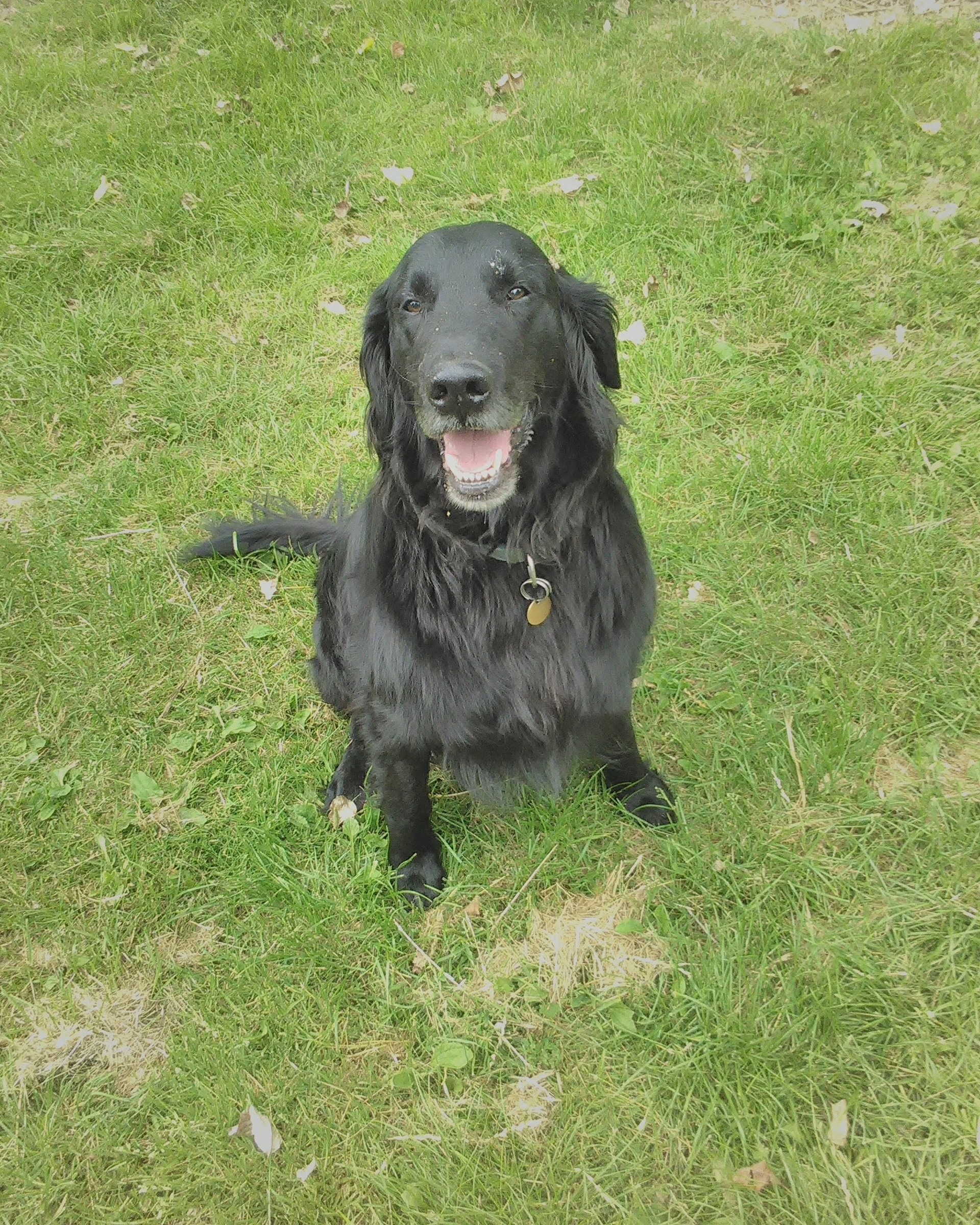
A male 7-year-old Flat Coated Retriever

=== Temperament ===
While they will protect their owners and property with an assertive bark, they are unlikely to back up such noise with actual aggression. Because of their excellent sense of smell, combined with their boundless energy and eagerness to please their masters, they are sometimes used as drug-sniffer dogs. They are used in the breeding program for The Guide Dogs for the Blind Association in the UK, both as a breed and as cross-breeds with the Labrador Retriever.

Paddy Petch, author of The Complete Flat-Coated Retriever, refers to these dogs as the "Peter Pan" of the retriever breeds, given they never quite grow up.

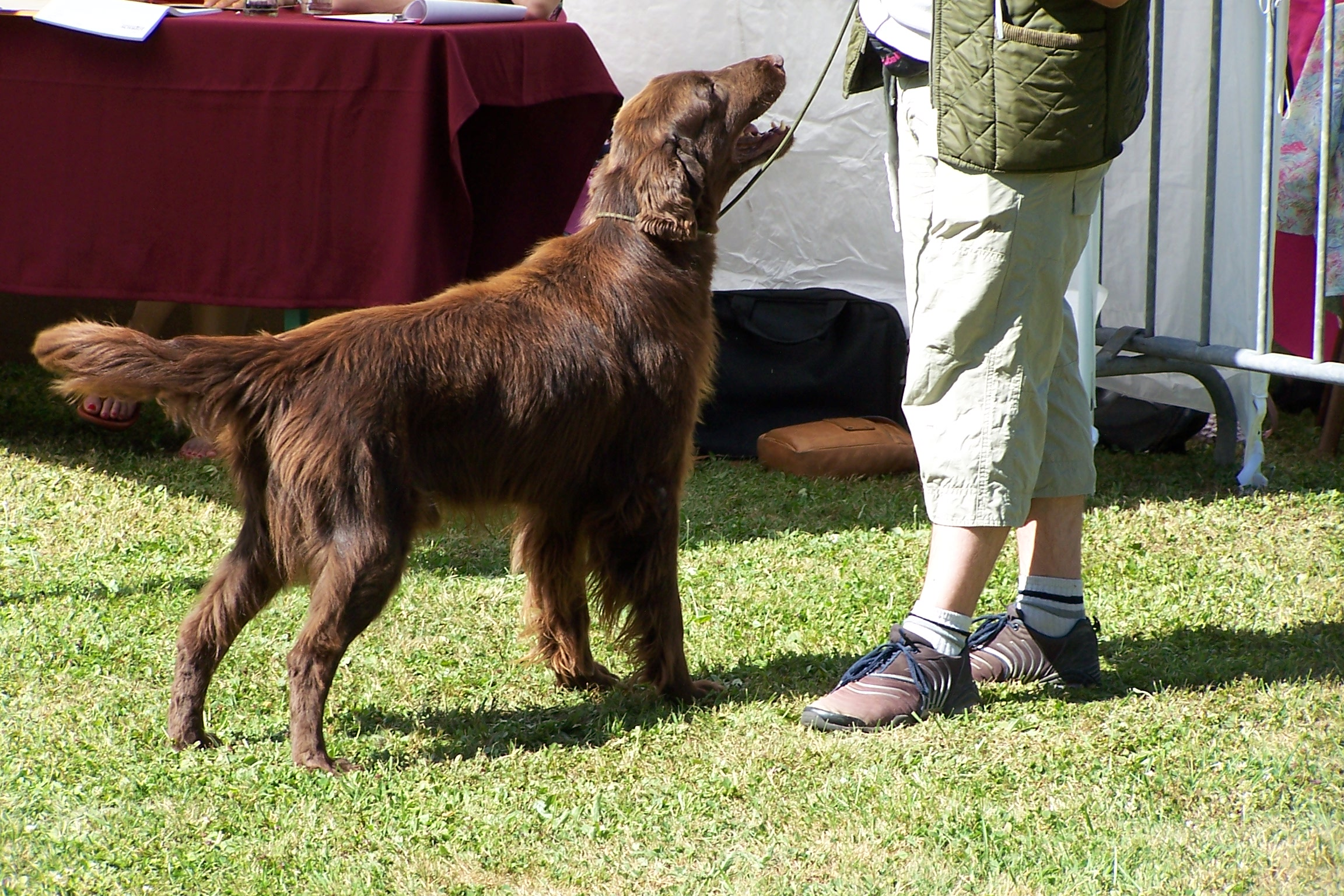
Black is the most common colour, but Flat-Coated Retrievers also occur in liver (dark brown) and yellow, although yellow is not allowed by the breed standard.

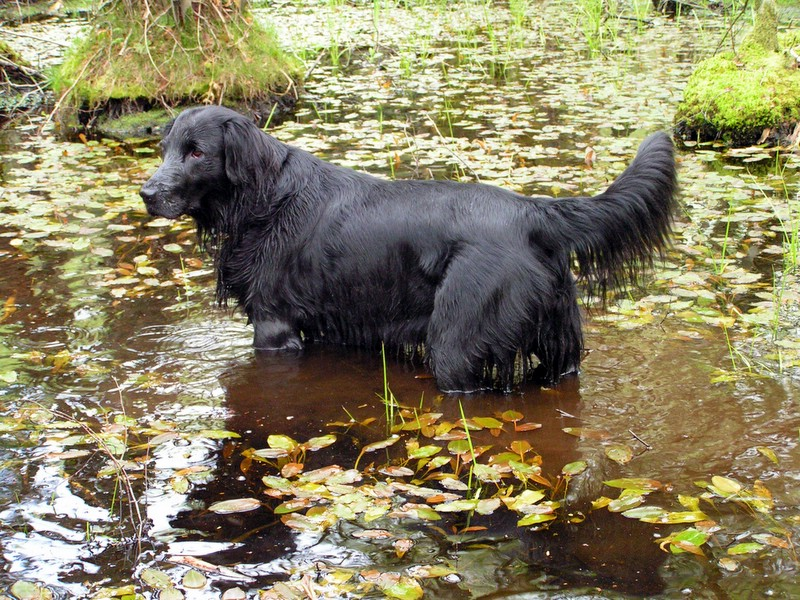
Flat-Coated Retrievers love water.

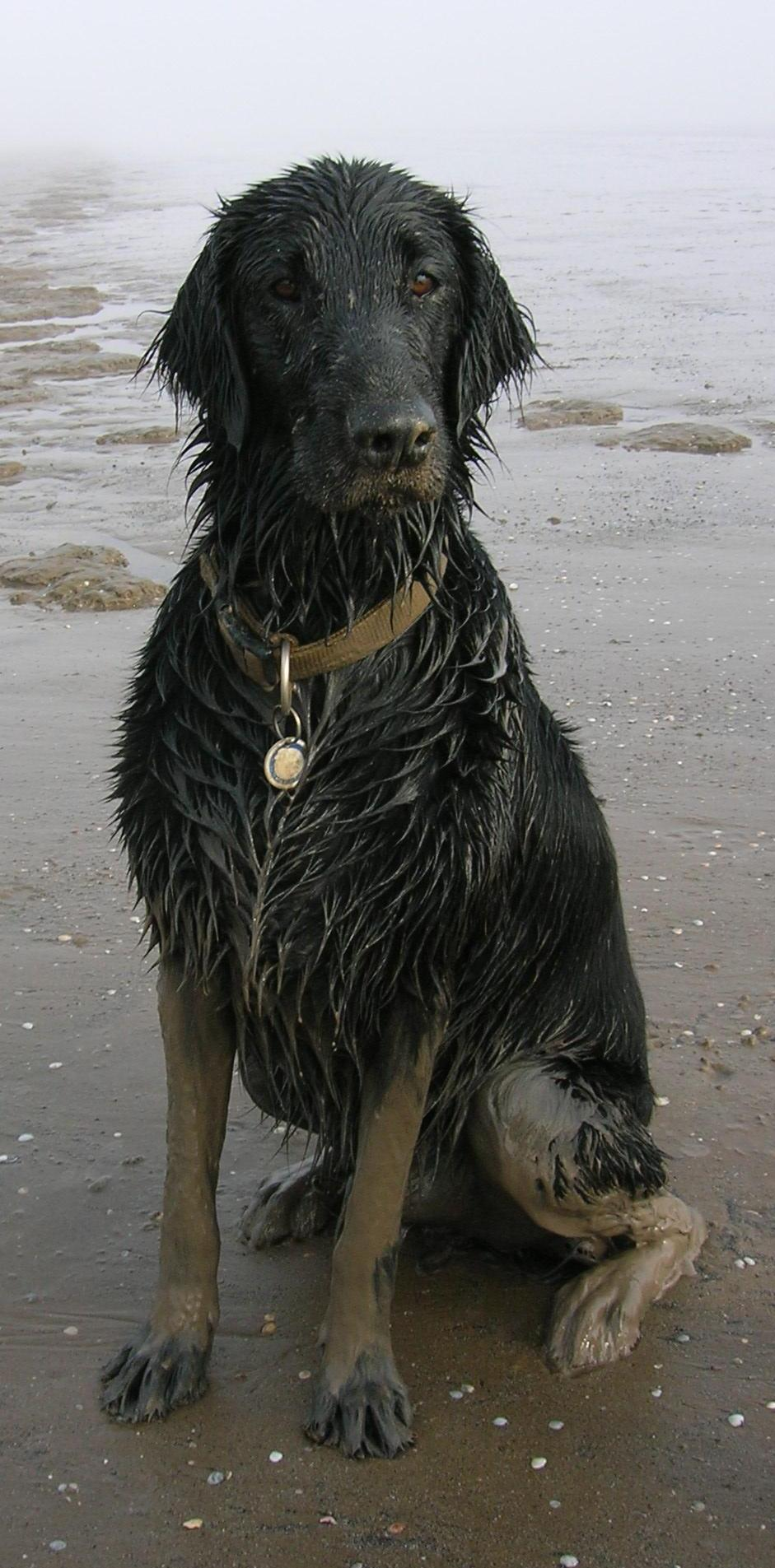
A Flat-Coated Retriever after swimming

== History ==
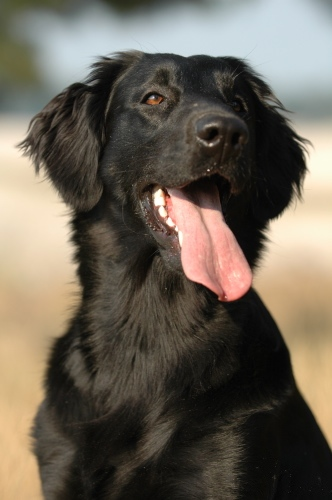
A typical Flat-Coated Retriever expression

Originating in the mid-19th century in England, the Flat-Coated Retriever gained popularity as a gamekeeper's dog. Part of its ancestry is thought to have come from stock imported from North America from the now extinct St. John's water dog, but this is unverified. Canadian seafarers are thought to have brought Newfoundlands to British ports, and they factored into the ancestry of the Flat-Coated Retriever. Collie-type dogs may have been added to increase the breed's trainability along with the Newfoundland for strength and Setter blood for enhanced scenting ability. The first examples of the breed were introduced around 1860, but the final type was only established 20 years later.

After its introduction into the U.S., the Flat-Coated Retriever began to quickly gain in popularity as a gun dog, and from 1873 when the breed became a "stable type" according to the American Kennel Club until 1915 when it was officially recognised as a breed, their number grew rapidly. However, soon after, their popularity began to decrease, eclipsed by the Golden Retriever, which was actually bred in part from the Flat-Coated Retriever, along with other breeds. By the end of World War II, so few Flat-Coated Retrievers remained, the breed's survival was uncertain. However, beginning in the 1960s, careful breeding brought the population back and the breed gained in popularity again, for both the sport of conformation showing, and as a companion pet. Today, the Flat-Coated Retriever enjoys a modest popularity and is moving ahead as a breed through attentive breeding for the conformation, health, multipurpose talent, and exceptional temperament that are its hallmarks. It has yet to return in substantial numbers to field competition.

Flat-Coated Retrievers have had success competing internationally, most notably at the UK’s Crufts Dog Show, the largest dog show in the world. In 2022, Baxer 'Ch. Almanza Backseat Driver', a 6-year-old liver flat-coated retriever from Oslo Norway, won Best in Show at Crufts. In 2011, 'Vbos The Kentuckian' (aka Jet), a 9.5-year-old Flat-Coated Retriever from South Queensferry, near Edinburgh, Scotland, also won Best in Show at Crufts. Almanza Far and Flyg (a.k.a. Simon), from Oslo, Norway, won the Gundog Group at Crufts in 2007. Before that in 2003, a Swedish dog 'Inkwells Named Shadow' also won the Gundog Group. The last UK dog to win the Gundog Group at Crufts was "Sh Ch Gayplume Dream-maker" in 2002. Prior to that, the Flat-Coated Retriever who won Best in Show at Crufts was 'Ch. Shargleam Blackcap' in 1980. These wins have contributed to the breed's popularity in Europe and the United Kingdom.

== Health ==
A 2024 UK study found a life expectancy of 11.7 years for the breed compared to an average of 12.7 for all purebreeds and 12 for crossbreeds.

The most common types of tumours in the Flat-coated Retriever are cutaneous histiocytomas and soft-tissue sarcomas. A health survey of purebred dogs in the UK from 2004 showed approximately 50% of Flat-Coated Retrievers death were due to some form of cancer.

== See also ==
- List of dog breeds
- Curly-coated Retriever
- Golden Retriever
- Labrador Retriever
