= Dog World (newspaper) =

Former British newspaper

- Type: Weekly newspaper
- Founded: 21 February 1902
- Headquarters: United Kingdom
- Circulation: 11,700 (2012)

Dog World was a weekly newspaper published in the United Kingdom. It was one of two specialist publications - the other being Our Dogs - catering mainly for the serious enthusiast of the pedigree dog but with content aimed at all who are interested in dogs. It should not be confused with the Dog World magazine published in the USA. The UK company ceased trading in June 2017 after being placed in administration.

== Profile ==
Each week Dog World contains news concerning all aspects of the canine world, in particular details of current events affecting dog owners, breeders, exhibitors and those who compete with their dogs in activities such as obedience, agility, gundog work and heelwork to music. Extensive coverage is given to political issues which may affect all dog owners. Regular feature articles include informed comment on the show scene and other competitive activities, living with dogs, veterinary topics, the dog in art, travelling with dogs, and young people and their dogs. Since 1993, the regular weekly column "A Vet's View" has been written by Professor Steve Dean, a KC Charitable Trust trustee who became Chairman of the Kennel Club in 2011. All the major dog shows in Britain are reported on, with the principal results and photographs of the main winners, and there is comprehensive news from events overseas.

The breeds recognised by The Kennel Club each have a regular column written by an experienced enthusiast, and a major part of the paper consists of judges' reports from the shows. The listings section includes details of forthcoming canine events. In association with companies well known in the world of dogs, Dog World runs annual points competitions to find the leading show dog, stud dog and brood bitch in each breed, sponsored by Arden Grange, Royal Canin and Lintbells respectively, as well as the Pup of the Year contest, sponsored by Nestle Purina, in which the cream of the young animals can compete.

The Audit Bureau records a 98.8 per cent purchased average circulation figure of 11,700 print copies each week throughout 2012.

== Dog politics ==
Dog World has traditionally published a wide cross section of opinion and has often taken issue with the Kennel Club (KC). Issues have included how the KC deals with complaints about judges' critiques. Columnists such as Steven Seymour have often been very critical of the lack of democracy in the KC. In 2010 the "Clarges Street Clarion" column written by a Kennel Club insider under the pseudonym "Trumpeter" was withdrawn due to the writer's, widely acknowledged to have been former KC Chairman Ronnie Irving, disagreements with editorial policy.

In 2008 the British dog world was shaken by the television programme Pedigree Dogs Exposed. Dog World was widely regarded as taking a softer line towards the programme and reforms that followed it than its rival Our Dogs. Most Dog World columnists took the view that PDE, although sensationalist and damaging, had made some valid points. One columnist, Kevin Colwill, was and remains largely supportive of the programme and the subsequent reforms in the pedigree word.

Dog World's website often had a majority of posters hostile to the KC and supportive of the health reform agenda although this may not be a true reflection of the feelings of the paper's readership.

== Associated publications ==
At intervals throughout the year, free supplements are issued with the weekly newspaper, dealing with individual breeds, groups of breeds or special topics. These include a guide to the world's best known and largest dog show, Crufts, which takes place in Birmingham each March, and another supplement featuring exclusively the leading show dogs of the previous year. Since the 1920s the company has also produced each December the glossy Dog World Annual which includes feature articles connected with the show scene, reports from around the world and advertisements from leading breeders and exhibitors.

== History ==
What is now Dog World first appeared on 21 February 1902, under the title of Illustrated Kennel News. It was edited by George Krehl, breeder and importer of a number of breeds and former editor of the dog section of The Stockkeeper. Proprietors included a number of the most eminent personalities of the dog scene of the time. In April 1918 the paper was renamed Country World and Illustrated Kennel News, this title lasting just under a year as the name Dog World was adopted on 4 April 1919. Of its editors, the longest serving in subsequent years were Phyllis Robson in the 1930s and 1940s. Robson bred Bulldogs but was better known for her successful Afghan Hound Ch. Asri-Havid of Ghazni. She often travelled to America and was described by Bengtson as "one of the emerging dog world's first international celebrities." On becoming editor, she retired from judging.

Editor in the 1950s and early 1960s was the famous all-breed judge Leo Wilson. He had a successful kennel of Smooth Fox Terriers.

Ferelith Hamilton, later Somerfield, one of Britain's best known dog judges, edited the paper from 1967 to 1986. She was followed by Simon Parsons, noted Corgi breeder and judge, to 2003.

The next editor, Stuart Baillie, was a departure in that he was not a "dog person" but a professional journalist. Baillie forged a partnership with Kerry Williamson, the company's Managing Director, that modernized and developed the paper. Baillie undertook a buy out of the paper in November 2007 and become joint-owner with Williamson. After Williamson's death Baillie became the sole owner of the company. He took over the role of managing director and, after a period operating under interim editors, the editorship passed to Damian Duro. Under Baillie's direction the company has moved into video production with dog world.tv. and it directs/produces the Horse and Country TV programme Around the Dog World. The programme first launched in 2011 and includes footage and interviews filmed at a variety of championship dog shows throughout the UK. On 8 June 2017 the company went into administration (formally announced on 13 June in The London Gazette); trading ceased on 23 June.
