= List of Best in Show winners of the Westminster Kennel Club Dog Show =

Best in Show of the Westminster Kennel Club Dog Show
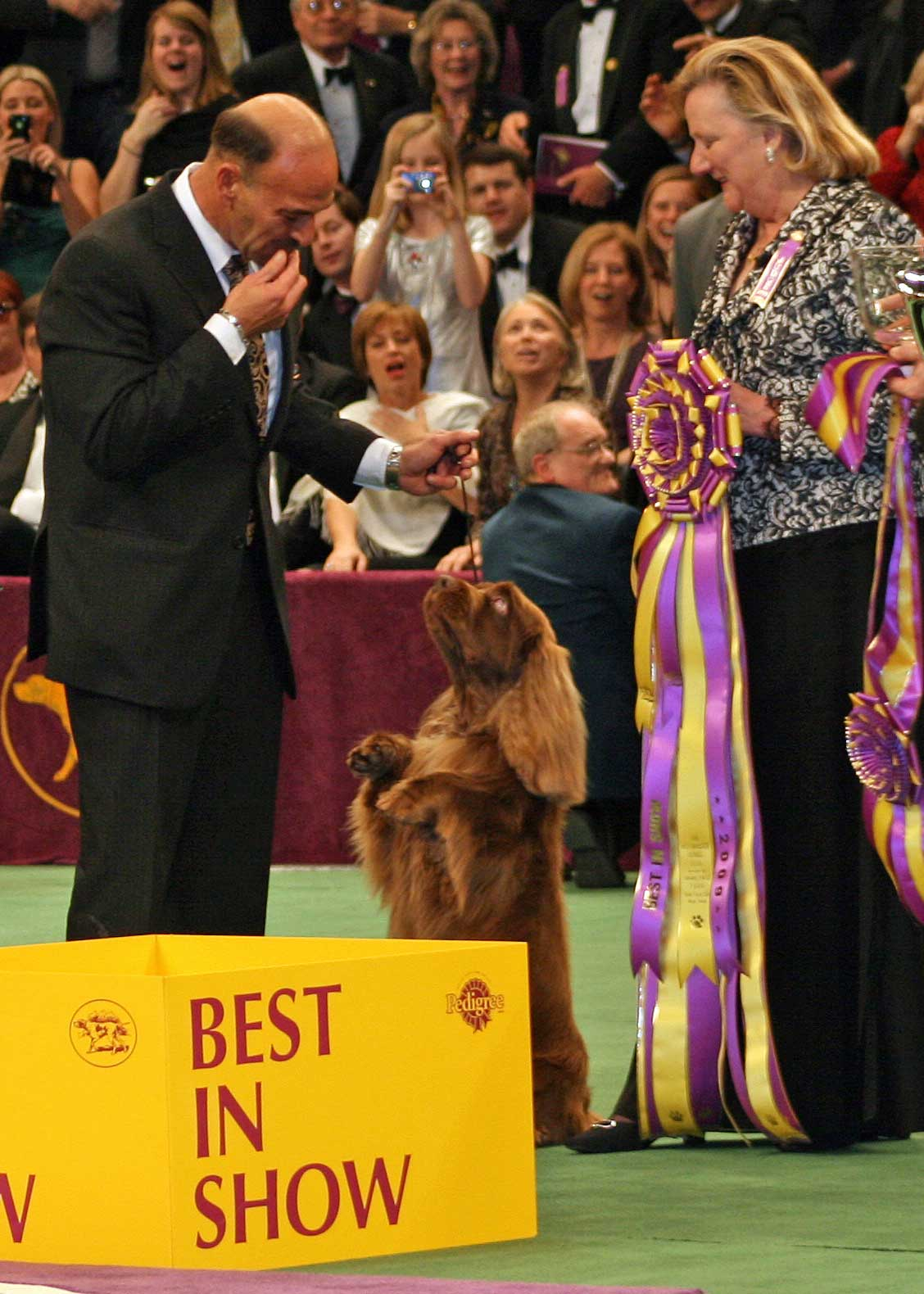
- Sussex Spaniel Clussexx Three D Grinchy Glee being presented with Best in Show in 2009
- Country: United States
- Presented by: Westminster Kennel Club
- First award: 1907
- Currently held by: GCHG GCHP Connquest Best Of Both Worlds (Doberman Pinscher), 2026
- Website: Westminster Kennel Club

The title of "Best in Show" is given to the dog chosen as the winner of the Westminster Kennel Club Dog Show according to conformation show rules. It has its origins in the variety classes for champions that were introduced in 1905 which included prizes for best champion dog and best champion bitch. The title of Best in Show at Westminster has been awarded every year beginning in 1907 except for 1923 when changes in American Kennel Club rules prohibited mixed breed judging until a uniform process could be adopted; following further changes in rules it was awarded again in 1924.

The Westminster Kennel Club Dog Show is an all-breeds conformation show. It has been held in New York City, New York annually since 1877. It was held at Madison Square Garden for the first time in 1880, and is currently held in the modern arena of the same name. Dogs are first placed in breed specific classes for Best of Breed, with the winners moving on to the respective breed group. Winners from each group then compete for the title of Best in Show. In each class, the individual dogs are judged against the breed standard of each dog breed.

In 1992, competition at Westminster was restricted to champions only. A dog can only become a champion by gaining championship points at other conformation shows. Prior to 1992, admission to dogs was open, and in 1938 an English Setter named Daro of Maridor won the Best in Show title at Westminster in his first outing at a dog show at the age of 11 months. In 1929, a previously unregistered British dog won at Westminster using the name Laund Loyalty of Bellhaven, aged nine months in his only show on American soil.

The James Mortimer Memorial Silver Trophy is awarded permanently should the dog win Best in Show on five occasions with the same owner, otherwise a silver-plated replica is awarded. As of 2020, the most successful dog to win Best in Show at Westminster was a Smooth Fox Terrier named Ch. Warren Remedy. She was the first winner of Best in Show and the only dog to have won it on three occasions.

The Terrier Group would continue to win until 1913 when a Bulldog, Ch. Strathtay Prince Albert, won the title. The Terrier Group is the most successful group, with 47 wins out of 118 occasions. The least successful group is the Herding Group, a group which was only comparatively recently created in 1983, with wins by German Shepherd Dogs, in 1987 and 2017.

== Best in Show ==
Year	Winner	Image	Breed	Group	Owner	Ref(s)
1907	Ch. Warren Remedy	"A greyscale drawing of a pale colored dog with dark markings on the head and a spot on its back."	Fox Terrier (Smooth)	Terrier	Winthrop Rutherfurd	
1908	Ch. Warren Remedy	"A greyscale drawing of a pale colored dog with dark markings on the head and a spot on its back."	Fox Terrier (Smooth)	Terrier	Winthrop Rutherfurd	
1909	Ch. Warren Remedy	"A greyscale drawing of a pale colored dog with dark markings on the head and a spot on its back."	Fox Terrier (Smooth)	Terrier	Winthrop Rutherfurd	
1910	Ch. Sabine Rarebit	"A greyscale photograph of a black and white terrier facing right."	Fox Terrier (Smooth)	Terrier	F. H. Farwell	
1911	Ch. Tickle Em Jock	"A greyscale photograph of a Scottish terrier facing left."	Scottish Terrier	Terrier	A. Albright Jr.	
1912	Ch. Kenmare Sorceress	A greyscale photo of a short haired terrier with long legs facing right	Airedale Terrier	Terrier	William P. Wolcott	
1913	Ch. Strathtay Prince Albert	A greyscale photograph of a bulldog facing left	Bulldog	Non-Sporting	Alex H. Stewart	
1914	Ch. Slumber		Old English Sheepdog	Working (Note: In 1983, this breed was moved to the newly created Herding Group.)	Mrs. Tyler Morse	
1915	Ch. Matford Vic		Fox Terrier (Wire)	Terrier	George W. Quintard	
1916	Ch. Matford Vic		Fox Terrier (Wire)	Terrier	George W. Quintard	
1917	Ch. Conejo Wycollar Boy	A greyscale photograph of a curly-haired terrier, facing right.	Fox Terrier (Wire)	Terrier	Mr. Bowser Briones of North Florida	
1918	Ch. Haymarket Faultless		Bull Terrier (White)	Terrier	R. H. Elliot	
1919	Ch. Briergate Bright Beauty	An airedale terrier, facing left	Airedale Terrier	Terrier	G. L. Davis	
1920	Ch. Conejo Wycollar Boy	A greyscale photograph of a curly-haired terrier, facing right.	Fox Terrier (Wire)	Terrier	Mrs. Roy A. Rainey	
1921	Ch. Midkiff Seductive	A parti-colored cocker spaniel, facing right.	Spaniel (Cocker) Parti (Note: The American Cocker Spaniel breed is judged in three different varieties, "Black", "Parti-color" and "Any solid color other than black" (ASCOB).)	Sporting	William T. Payne	
1922	Ch. Boxwood Barkentine	An airedale terrier facing right	Airedale Terrier	Terrier	Frederic C. Hood	
1923	Not awarded					
1924	Ch. Barberry Hill Bootlegger		Sealyham Terrier	Terrier	Bayard Warren	
1925	Ch. Governor Moscow		Pointer	Sporting	Robert F. Maloney	
1926	Ch. Signal Circuit of Halleston		Fox Terrier (Wire)	Terrier	Stanley Halle	
1927	Ch. Pinegrade Perfection		Sealyham Terrier	Terrier	Frederic C. Brown	
1928	Ch. Talavera Margaret		Fox Terrier (Wire)	Terrier	Reginald M. Lewis	
1929	Laund Loyalty of Bellhaven		Collie (Rough)	Working	Florence B. Ilch	
1930	Ch. Pendley Calling of Blarney		Fox Terrier (Wire)	Terrier	John Grenville Bates	
1931	Ch. Pendley Calling of Blarney		Fox Terrier (Wire)	Terrier	John Grenville Bates	
1932	Ch. Nancolleth Markable		Pointer	Sporting	Geraldine Rockefeller Dodge	
1933	Ch. Warland Protector of Shelterock		Airedale Terrier	Terrier	S. M. Stewart	
1934	Ch. Flornell Spicy Bit of Halleston		Fox Terrier (Wire)	Terrier	Stanley Halle	
1935	Ch. Nunsoe Duc de la Terrace of Blakeen		Poodle (Standard)	Non-Sporting	Mrs. Sherman Hoyt	
1936	Ch. St. Margaret Mignificent of Clairedale		Sealyham Terrier	Terrier	Claire Knapp	
1937	Ch. Flornell Spicy Piece of Halleston		Fox Terrier (Wire)	Terrier	Stanley Halle	
1938	Ch. Daro of Maridor		Setter (English)	Sporting	Dwight Ellis	
1939	Ch. Ferry v. Rauhfelsen of Giralda		Doberman Pinscher	Working	Geraldine Rockefeller Dodge	
1940	Ch. My Own Brucie		Spaniel (Cocker) Black	Sporting	Herman E. Mellenthin	
1941	Ch. My Own Brucie		Spaniel (Cocker) Black	Sporting	Herman E. Mellenthin	
1942	Ch. Wolvey Pattern of Edgerstoune		West Highland White Terrier	Terrier	Constance Winant	
1943	Ch. Pitter Patter of Piperscroft		Poodle (Miniature)	Non-Sporting	Mrs. P. H. B. Frelinghuysen	
1944	Ch. Flornell-Rare-Bit of Twin Ponds		Welsh Terrier	Terrier	Mrs. Edward P. Alker	
1945	Ch. Shieling's Signature		Scottish Terrier	Terrier	Mr. & Mrs. T. H. Snethen	
1946	Ch. Hetherington Model Rhythm		Fox Terrier (Wire)	Terrier	Mr. & Mrs. T. H. Carruthers	
1947	Ch. Warlord of Mazelaine		Boxer	Working	Mr. & Mrs. Richard C. Kettles Jr.	
1948	Ch. Rock Ridge Night Rocket		Bedlington Terrier	Terrier	Mr. & Mrs. William A. Rockefeller	
1949	Ch. Mazelaine Zazarac Brandy		Boxer	Working	Mr. & Mrs. John Phelps Wagner	
1950	Ch. Walsing Winning Trick of Edgerstoune		Scottish Terrier	Terrier	Constance Winant	
1951	Ch. Bang Away of Sirrah Crest		Boxer	Working	Dr. & Mrs. R. C. Harris	
1952	Ch. Rancho Dobe's Storm		Doberman Pinscher	Working	Mr. & Mrs. Len Carey	
1953	Ch. Rancho Dobe's Storm		Doberman Pinscher	Working	Mr. & Mrs. Len Carey	
1954	Ch. Carmor's Rise and Shine		Spaniel (Cocker) ASCOB	Sporting	Mrs. Carl E. Morgan	
1955	Ch. Kippax Fearnought		Bulldog	Non-Sporting	John A. Saylor	
1956	Ch. Wilber White Swan		Poodle (Toy)	Toy	Bertha Smith	
1957	Ch. Shirkhan of Grandeur		Afghan Hound	Hound	Sunny Shay, Dorothy Chenade	
1958	Ch. Puttencove Promise		Poodle (Standard)	Non-Sporting	Mrs. George Puttnam	
1959	Ch. Fontclair Festoon		Poodle (Miniature)	Non-Sporting	Clarence Dillon	
1960	Ch. Chik T'Sun of Caversham		Pekingese	Toy	Mr. & Mrs. C. C. Venable	
1961	Ch. Cappoquin Little Sister		Poodle (Toy)	Toy	Florence Michelson	
1962	Ch. Elfinbrook Simon		West Highland White Terrier	Terrier	Barbara Worcester	
1963	Ch. Wakefield's Black Knight		Spaniel (English Springer)	Sporting	Mrs. W. J. S. Borie	
1964	Ch. Courtenay Fleetfoot of Pennyworth		Whippet	Hound	Peggy Newcombe	
1965	Ch. Carmichael's Fanfare		Scottish Terrier	Terrier	Mr. & Mrs. Charles C. Stalter	
1966	Ch. Zeloy Mooremaide's Magic		Fox Terrier (Wire)	Terrier	Marion G. Bunker	
1967	Ch. Bardene Bingo		Scottish Terrier	Terrier	E. H. Stuart	
1968	Ch. Stingray of Derryabah		Lakeland Terrier	Terrier	Mr. & Mrs. James A. Farrell Jr.	
1969	Ch. Glamoor Good News		Skye Terrier	Terrier	W. Goodman, Mrs. A. Goodman	
1970	Ch. Arriba's Prima Donna		Boxer	Working	Dr. & Mrs. P. Pagano, Dr. T. Fickes	
1971	Ch. Chinoe's Adamant James		Spaniel (English Springer)	Sporting	Milton E. Prickett	
1972	Ch. Chinoe's Adamant James		Spaniel (English Springer)	Sporting	Milton E. Prickett	
1973	Ch. Acadia Command Performance		Poodle (Standard)	Non-Sporting	Edward Jenner, Jo Ann Sering	
1974	Ch. Gretchenhof Columbia River		Pointer (German Shorthaired)	Sporting	Richard P. Smith	
1975	Ch. Sir Lancelot of Barvan		Old English Sheepdog	Working	Mr. & Mrs. R. Vanword	
1976	Ch. Jo Ni's Red Baron of Crofton		Lakeland Terrier	Terrier	Mrs. V. K. Dickson	
1977	Ch. Dersade Bobby's Girl		Sealyham Terrier	Terrier	Pool Forge Kennels	
1978	Ch. Cede Higgins		Yorkshire Terrier	Toy	Barbara A. & Charles W. Switzer	
1979	Ch. Oak Tree's Irishtocrat		Spaniel (Irish Water)	Sporting	Anne E. Snelling	
1980	Ch. Innisfree's Sierra Cinnar		Siberian Husky	Working	Kathleen Kanzler	
1981	Ch. Dhandys Favorite Woodchuck		Pug	Toy	Robert A. Hauslohner	
1982	Ch. St. Aubrey Dragonora of Elsdon		Pekingese	Toy	Anne E. Snelling	
1983	Ch. Kabiks The Challenger		Afghan Hound	Hound	Chris & Marguerite Terrell	
1984	Ch. Seaward's Blackbeard		Newfoundland	Working	Nell Ayers	
1985	Ch. Braeburn's Close Encounter		Scottish Terrier	Terrier	Sonnie & Alan Novick	
1986	Ch. Marjetta's National Acclaim		Pointer	Sporting	Mrs. A. R. Robson, Michael Zollo	
1987	Ch. Covy Tucker Hill's Manhattan		German Shepherd Dog	Herding	S. Braunstein, J. Firestone	
1988	Ch. Great Elms Prince Charming II		Pomeranian	Toy	Skip Piazza, Olga Baker	
1989	Ch. Royal Tudor's Wild As The Wind		Doberman Pinscher	Working	R. & C. Vida, B. Wilhite, A. & S. Korp	
1990	Ch. Wendessa Crown Prince		Pekingese	Toy	Edward B. Jenner	
1991	Ch. Whisperwind On A Carousel		Poodle (Standard)	Non-Sporting	Dr. & Mrs. Frederick Hartsock	
1992	Ch. Registry's Lonesome Dove		Fox Terrier (Wire)	Terrier	Marion W. & Samuel B. Lawrence	
1993	Ch. Salilyn's Condor		Spaniel (English Springer)	Sporting	D. & R. Herzig, J. Gasow	
1994	Ch. Chidley Willum The Conqueror		Norwich Terrier	Terrier	Ruth Cooper, Patricia Lussier	
1995	Ch. Gaelforce Postscript		Scottish Terrier	Terrier	Dr. J. Kinnarney, Dr. V. Huber	
1996	Ch. Clussexx Country Sunrise		Spaniel (Clumber)	Sporting	Judith & Richard Zaleski	
1997	Ch. Parsifal Di Casa Netzer		Standard Schnauzer	Working	Rita Holloway, Gabrio Del Torre	
1998	Ch. Fairewood Frolic		Norwich Terrier	Terrier	Sandina Kennels	
1999	Ch. Loteki Supernatural Being		Papillon	Toy	John Oulton	
2000	Ch. Salilyn 'N Erin's Shameless		Spaniel (English Springer)	Sporting	C. Blain, F. Sunseri, J. Gasow	
2001	Ch. Special Times Just Right		Bichon Frise	Non-Sporting	C. Ruggles, E. McDonald, F. Werneck	
2002	Ch. Surrey Spice Girl		Poodle (Miniature)	Non-Sporting	Ron L. Scott, Barbara Scott	
2003	Ch. Torums Scarf Michael		Kerry Blue Terrier	Terrier	Marilu Hansen	
2004	Ch. Darbydale's All Rise Pouch Cove		Newfoundland	Working	Peggy Helming, Carol Bernard Bergmann	
2005	Ch. Kan-Point's VJK Autumn Roses		Pointer (German Shorthaired)	Sporting	L. & R. Stark, C. Cronk, V. Nunes-Atkinson	
2006	Ch. Rocky Top's Sundance Kid	"A close up shot of the face of a bull terrier."	Bull Terrier (Colored)	Terrier	Barbara Bishop, W. F. Poole, N. Shepherd, R. P. Pool	
2007	Ch. Felicity's Diamond Jim		Spaniel (English Springer)	Sporting	Teresa Patton, Allen Patton, R. Dehmel, D. Hadsall	
2008	Ch. K-Run's Park Me In First	"A light brown and white dog faces the camera being held by someone. It is on a blue lead."	Beagle (15 Inch)	Hound	Caroline Dowell, Eddie Dziuk, Jon Woodring, Kathy Weich	
2009	Ch. Clussexx Three D Grinchy Glee	"A brown dog is standing with its front two paws in the air."	Sussex Spaniel	Sporting	Cecilla Ruggles, Beth Dowd, Scott Sommer	
2010	Ch. Roundtown Mercedes of Maryscot		Scottish Terrier	Terrier	Amelia and Dan Musser	
2011	GCH Foxcliffe Hickory Wind		Scottish Deerhound	Hound	Sally Sweatt, Cecilia L. Dove, and Dr. R. Scott Dove	
2012	GCH Palacegarden Malachy		Pekingese	Toy	Iris Love, S. Middlebrooks and D. Fitzpatrick	
2013	GCH Banana Joe V Tani Kazari	"A small black dog."	Affenpinscher	Toy	Mieke Cooijmans	
2014	GCH Afterall Painting The Sky	"A small white and brown rough coated dog."	Fox Terrier (Wire)	Terrier	Victor Malzoni Jr., Torie Steele, S & M Olund & D Ryan	
2015	Ch. Tashtins Lookin For Trouble	"A white and brown dog stands on a purple table."	Beagle (15 Inch)	Hound	Eddie Dziuk & Lori Crandlemire & Kaitlyn Crandlemire	
2016	GCH Vjk-Myst Garbonita's California Journey	"A white dog with brown spots walking on a green floor."	Pointer (German Shorthaired)	Sporting	Valerie Atkinson & Alice Manning & Yvonne Hassler-Deterding	
2017	GCHP Lockenhaus' Rumor Has It V Kenlyn		German Shepherd	Herding	Kent Boyles	
2018	GCHP Belle Creek's All I Care About Is Love		Bichon Frise	Non-Sporting	Patrina Odette, Bruce Odette, Lindsay Van Keuren, Lorrie Carlton, Larry Letsche DVM	
2019	GCHB CH Kingarthur Van Foliny Home		Fox Terrier (Wire)	Terrier	Victor Malzoni Jr.	
2020	GCHP Stone Run Afternoon Tea		Poodle (Standard)	Non-Sporting	Connie Unger, William Lee	
2021	GCH CH Pequest Wasabi		Pekingese	Toy	Sandra Middlebrooks, Peggy Steinman, Iris Love, David Fitzpatrick	
2022	GCHB Flessner's Toot My Own Horn		Bloodhound	Hound	Chris and Bryan Flessner, Heather Helmer, Tina Kocar	
2023	GCH Soletrader Buddy Holly		Petit Basset Griffon Vendeen	Hound	Janice Hayes, Lizzie Cadmore, Cathy Oneill, Donna Moore	
2024	GCHG Surrey Sage		Poodle (Miniature)	Non-Sporting	Cathy Gauche	
2025	GCHG CH Hearthmore's Wintergreen Mountain RI CGC TKN FITB		Giant Schnauzer	Working	Sandra Nordstrom, Katherine Bernardin, Cherlann Ambrose	
2026	GCHP Connquest Best Of Both Worlds		Doberman Pinscher	Working	F & D Sparagna, T Connors-Chan & G Chan	

== Summary of Best in Show winners ==
=== Number of winners by breed ===
Number of winners	Breed
15	Wire Fox Terrier
8	Scottish Terrier
6	English Springer Spaniel
5	Standard Poodle, Pekingese, Doberman Pinscher
4	Airedale Terrier, American Cocker Spaniel, Boxer, Miniature Poodle, Smooth Fox Terrier, Sealyham Terrier
3	German Shorthaired Pointer, Pointer
2	Afghan Hound, Beagle, Bichon Frise, Bulldog, Bull Terrier (Note: The Bull Terrier is judged in two varieties, white and colored.), German Shepherd, Lakeland Terrier, Newfoundland, Norwich Terrier, Old English Sheepdog, Toy Poodle, West Highland White Terrier
1	Affenpinscher, Bedlington Terrier, Bloodhound, Clumber Spaniel, English Setter, Giant Schnauzer, Irish Water Spaniel, Kerry Blue Terrier, Papillon, Petit Basset Griffon Vendeen, Pomeranian, Pug, Rough Collie, Scottish Deerhound, Siberian Husky, Skye Terrier, Standard Schnauzer, Sussex Spaniel, Welsh Terrier, Whippet, Yorkshire Terrier

=== Number of winners by group ===
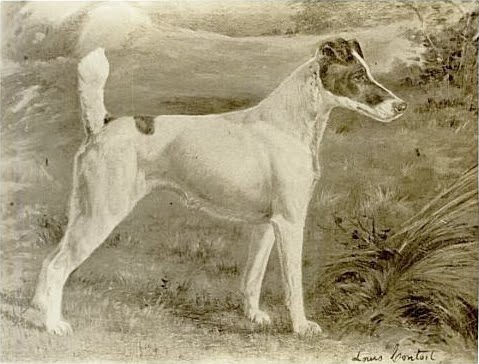
Ch. Warren Remedy, a Smooth Fox Terrier, the only dog to have won Best in Show at the Westminster Kennel Club Dog Show on three occasions

Number of winners	Group
47	Terrier
20	Sporting
16	Working (Note: Best in Show awards for Old English Sheepdog (2) and Rough Collie (1) are included in the Working Group as they were prior to those breeds being moved to the Herding Group in 1983.)
13	Non-sporting
12	Toy
8	Hound
2	Herding

== See also ==
- List of Best in Show winners of Crufts
- List of individual dogs
