= Tashtins Lookin For Trouble =

Award-winning dog

Ch. Tashtins Lookin For Trouble
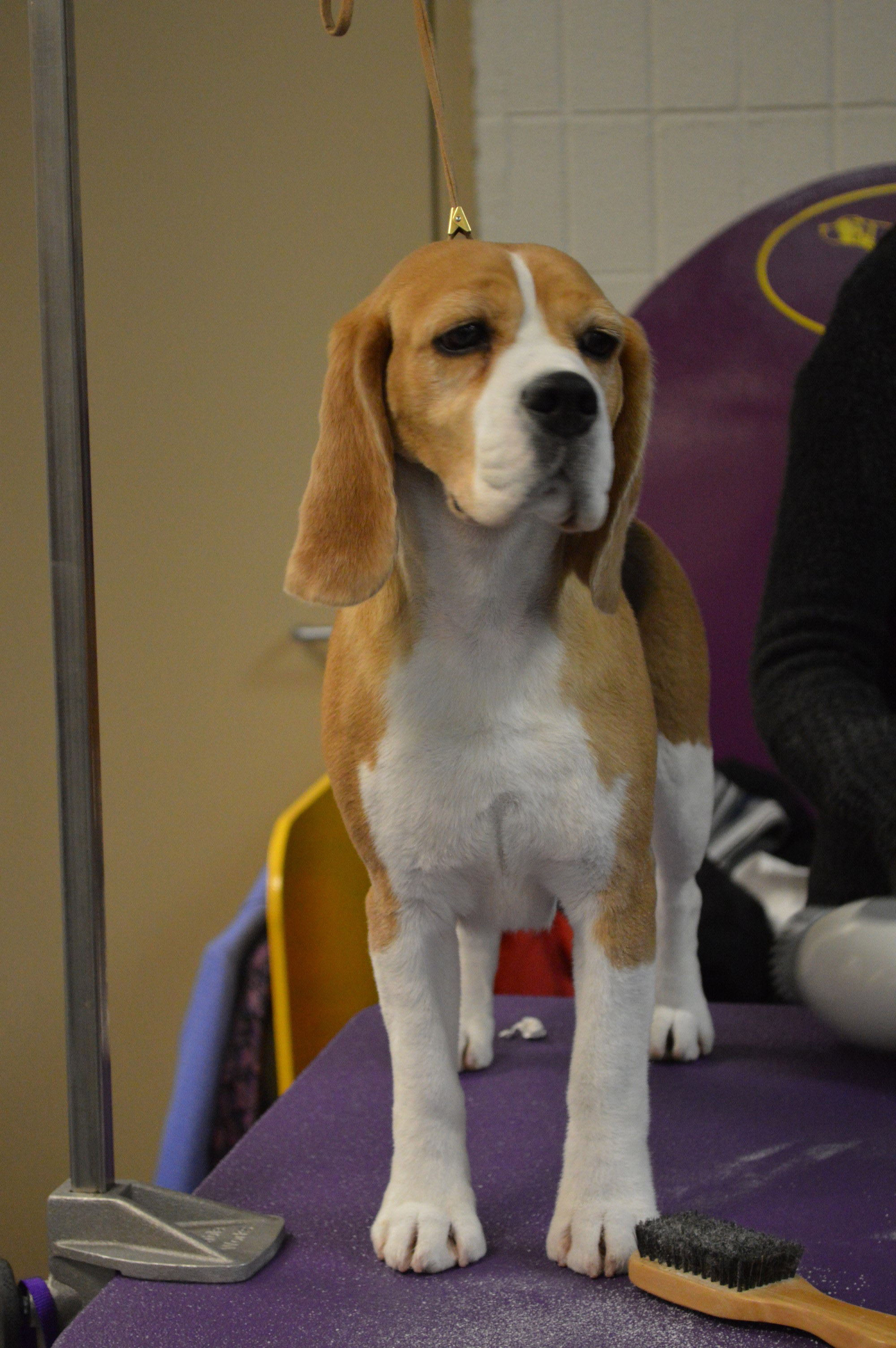
- Tashtins Lookin For Trouble, at the Westminster Kennel Club dog show in 2015
- Other name: Miss P
- Species: Canis lupus familiaris
- Breed: Beagle
- Sex: Female
- Born: January 9, 2011
- Died: October 2021
- Occupation: Show dog
- Title: Best In Show at the Westminster Dog Show
- Term: 2015
- Predecessor: GCH Afterall Painting The Sky
- Owners: Lori and Kaitlyn Crandlemire, Brody Cavanaugh and Eddie Dziuk
- Parents: Ch. Ha-Penny's Too Much Trouble (sire); Tashtin I Do De Claire (dam)
- Height: 15 in (38 cm)
- Awards: 20 "best in show" wins

Ch. Tashtins Lookin For Trouble (January 9, 2011–October 2021), also known as Miss P, was a female beagle from Enderby, British Columbia and Milton, Ontario, who was named the 2015 Best In Show winner at the Westminster Kennel Club Dog Show. Miss P has 20 Best in Show wins in the United States, and was the second beagle to win Westminster's Best in Show after Uno, who was her great-uncle. She died in her sleep in October 2021 at the age of 10.

== Biography ==
Tashtins Lookin For Trouble was born on January 9, 2011, sired by Ch. Ha-Penny's Too Much Trouble with dam Tashtin I Do De Claire. A tri-coloured Beagle, her owners are mother-and-daughter team Lori and Kaitlyn Crandlemire of Enderby, British Columbia, along with co-owners Brody Cavanaugh, a third-generation beagle owner, and Eddie Dziuk, an American breeder. Her nickname "Miss P" is short for "Peyton", although her handler William Alexander has also called her "Princess" based on her diva-like personality, saying: "She is a princess. It’s all about her. She’s so demanding. She thinks she’s the biggest dog in the dog show." The Crandlemires run Tashtin Kennels in Enderby, and Dzuik is also the co-owner of Ch. K-Run's Park Me In First, or "Uno", the Westminster Kennel Club Dog Show 2008 Best in Show winner, and the great-uncle of Miss P, although the two have never met. Miss P was born in Lori Crandlemire's bedroom in Enderby, and was discovered as a puppy by Alexander, who saw potential in her as a show dog. At six months of age, Miss P was moved to Alexander's residence in Milton, Ontario for training, and although she has divided her time between Enderby and Milton ever since, she has spent most of her life with Alexander in Milton.

In 2011, as a young puppy, Miss P was shown 12 days, and in that time won nine puppy groups, one Best Puppy In Show and multiple group placings. The next year, she achieved her first American Kennel Club championship, winning Best in Show at the National Dog Show in Aldie, Virginia, as well as multiple Best in Show awards, and was Best of Variety at the Eukanuba National Championship. She finished 2012 as the number one Beagle and number two hound. In 2013, Miss P achieved her Grand Championship and multi-group placings in the United States. Before performing in the 2015 Westminster Kennel Club Dog Show, she had 19 Best in Show wins in the United States. Miss P trains regularly, running on her treadmill and eating nutritious food. Alexander said her success comes largely from her hard work, but also from her "diva personality" because "she's showing off; it's all about vanity".

Miss P died at her home in October 2021. She was reported to have died peacefully in her sleep.

== Westminster ==
The 2015 Westminster Dog Show marked Miss P's second showing at Westminster. She advanced to the final round after winning the hound group on February 16, beating out the projected favorite, a bloodhound named Nathan. The next day, Miss P won Best in Show, becoming only the second beagle in Westminster history to do so, after Uno. It was widely considered an upset victory, and the crowd gasped loudly when she was announced the winner. Judge David Merriam, judging a best in show for the first time, took 20 minutes to make his decision. He said Miss P had a "wonderful type" and "wonderful head", and watching her move he could simultaneously see "the beagle in the ring and the beagle in the field".

Miss P beat six dogs in the final category, which combined for more than 500 career best in shows among them. Many of the competing dogs were considered likelier to win, particularly crowd favorite Swagger, an Old English Sheepdog, who won reserve best in show at the 2013 Westminster show, and Matisse, a Portuguese Water Dog who was a cousin to President Barack Obama's dog Sunny, and the most successful male show-dog in history with 238 best in shows. Other competitors included a Skye Terrier; standard poodle, English Springer Spaniel, and a Shih Tzu named Rocket, who had been previously owned by Patty Hearst. In total, Miss P beat out almost 2,710 competitors in 192 breeds and varieties.

Miss P was retired from dog shows after winning the Westminster, and was to return to her native Canada to brand litters of puppies. Following her victory, Miss P received a walk-on part in the Broadway musical Kinky Boots, as well as lunch at Sardi's, a meeting with Donald Trump, a visit to the Empire State Building, and appearances on the television shows Good Day New York, The View, Fox & Friends, and shows hosted by Shepard Smith and Keith Olbermann. Enderby Councillor Brian Schreiner said Miss P was the city's most important citizen since baseball player Kevin Reimer, and Mayor Greg McCune joked: "We're going to immediately change our name to Ender-beagle."
