= Slumber (dog) =

Ch. Slumber
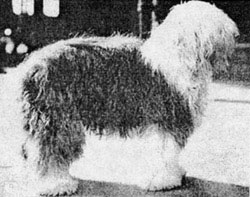
- Species: Dog
- Breed: Old English Sheepdog
- Title: Best in show winner at the Westminster Kennel Club Dog Show
- Term: 1914
- Predecessor: Strathtay Prince Albert
- Successor: Matford Vic
- Owner: Mrs. Tyler Morse

Ch. Slumber was an Old English Sheepdog that won best in show at the Westminster Kennel Club Dog Show in 1914. He was owned by Mrs. Tyler Morse (Allon Mae Fuller) and was "hands down" the winner of the show. Slumber's win in 1914 is credited with having promoted the popularity of the breed today.

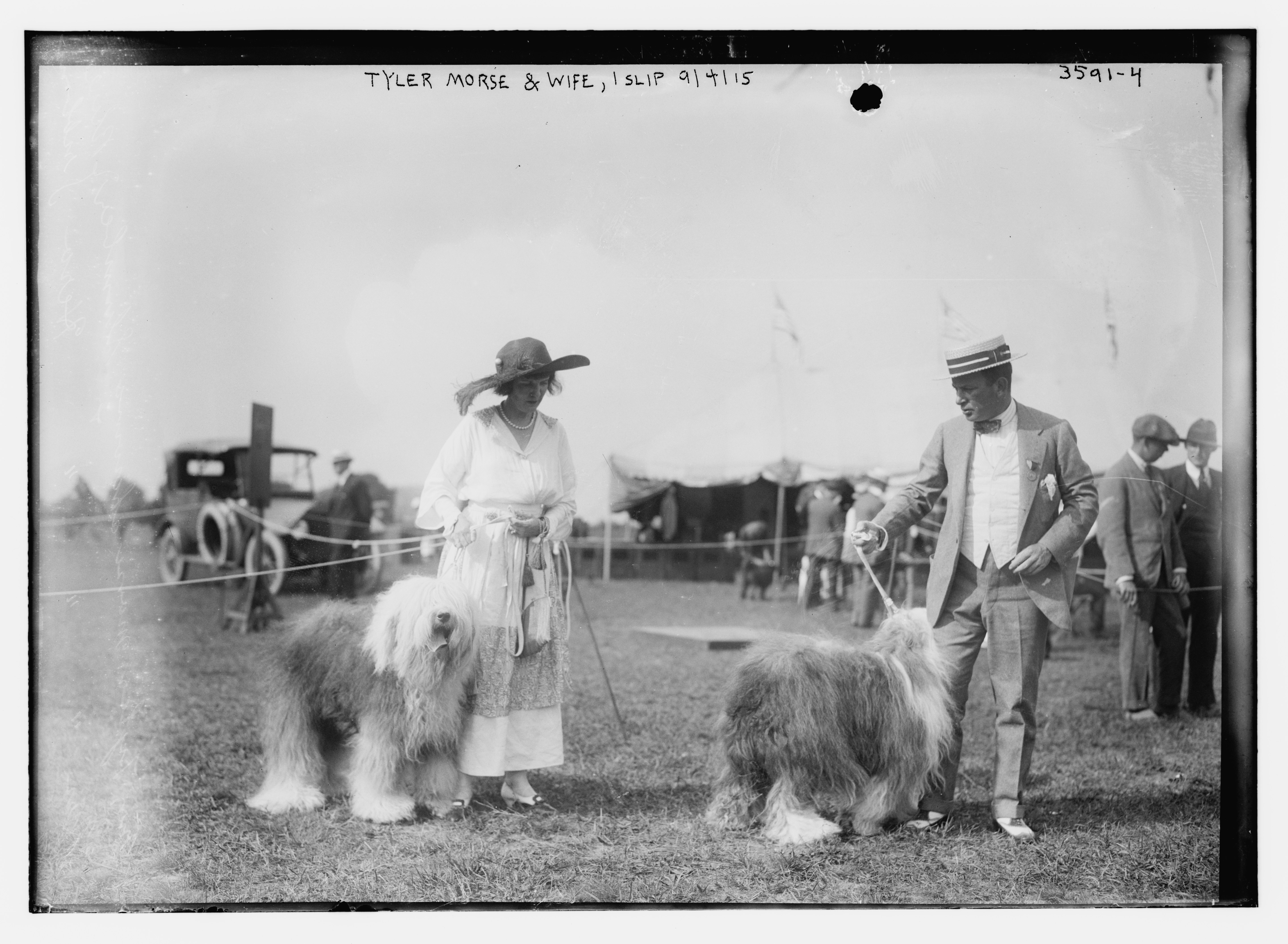
Mr. and Mrs. Tyler Morse with Midnight and Slumber, prob. 1915, Islip, NY
