= Strathtay Prince Albert =

Prize-winning Bulldog

Ch. Strathtay Prince Albert
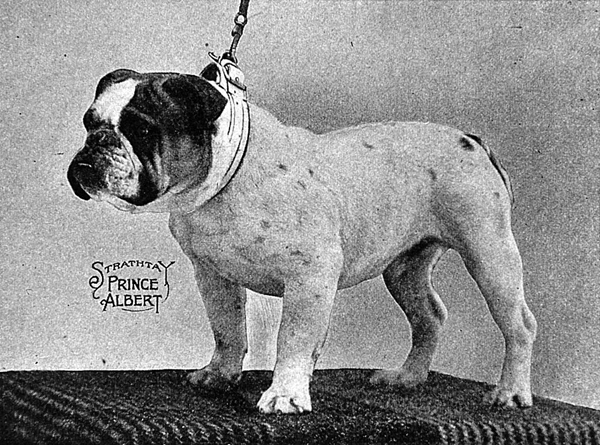
- Species: Canis lupus familiaris
- Breed: Bulldog
- Sex: Male
- Born: 3 July 1910
- Known for: Best In Show at the Westminster Dog Show
- Term: 1913–1914
- Predecessor: Ch. Kenmare Sorceress (Airedale Terrier)
- Successor: Ch. Slumber (Old English Sheepdog)
- Owner: Alexander H. Stewart
- Parents: Chineham Joker (sire); Moston Violet (dam)

Ch. Strathtay Prince Albert (3 July 1910 – unknown), a Bulldog, was the winner of the title of Best in Show at the Westminster Kennel Club Dog Show in 1913. He placed third at the show in 1914 and continued to appear at the competition for several years afterwards, winning Best of Breed on several more occasions.

== Early life ==
Prince Albert was a white Bulldog, with brindle patches around the side of his head. He was originally owned by an officer in the British Army, who sold the dog on when he was transferred to India. It was sired by Chineham Joker, to dam Moston Violet, in Cheshire, England, and was purchased by Alexander H. Stewart of Chicago.

== Show history ==
He was shown in a single show in his native England, at Chatham Hill where he was defeated by a dog named Centaur. Centaur was imported to the United States around the same time as Albert, being renamed to Dreamwold Centaur. Centaur's string of victories in Britain overshadowed Albert's arrival in the US.

When Albert won Best in Show at Westminster, it was seen as a surprise since he was the first non-terrier to take the title, defeating Wire Fox Terrier Vickery Estelle into second place. The other breeds in the final round of judging were an English Foxhound, an American Foxhound, a Manchester Terrier, an Airedale Terrier, a Bedlington Terrier, an Old English Sheepdog, a Doberman Pinscher, a Chow Chow and a Cocker Spaniel. Albert would go on to be beaten twice within four months by his rival, Dreamwold Centaur, including at the Bulldog Breeders' Association of America Show in New York in May.

In 1914, he won Best of Breed at Westminster once again. Runner up in the breed competition was another Dreamwold dog, Dreamwold Irish Boy. Fifty dogs made it through to the Best in Show contest at the 1914 Westminster, of which Albert placed third, being bested by Wire Fox Terrier Vickery Fast Freight into second place. Best in Show went to an Old English Sheepdog name Slumber, the first of its breed to take the title. Vickery Fast Freight had knocked out future two time Best in Show winner Matford Vic in the breed competition.

In 1915, Albert retained his title of best male Bulldog at Westminster, and went on to win Best of Breed, a feat he repeated in a reduced field at the 1916 competition, and in 1917, where he was described as "easily the best". However, he did not make it to the final round of judging in that year, as he was once again bested by the Old English Sheepdog, Slumber, at the group stage. Slumber would eventually place second overall in the competition.
