= Boxwood Barkentine =

Ch. Boxwood Barkentine
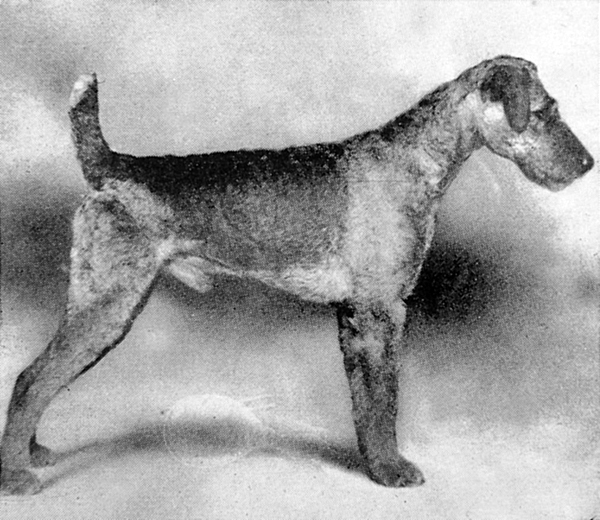
- Boxwood Barkentine in 1922
- Species: Canis lupus familiaris
- Breed: Airedale Terrier
- Sex: Male
- Born: July 1920; Brookline, Massachusetts
- Occupation: Show dog
- Title: Best In Show at the Westminster Dog Show
- Term: 1922–1923
- Predecessor: Ch. Midkiff Seductive (Cocker Spaniel)
- Successor: Ch. Barberry Hill Bootlegger (Sealyham Terrier)
- Owner: Frederic C. Newton

Ch. Boxwood Barkentine (born July 1920), an Airedale Terrier, was the Best in Show at the 1922 Westminster Kennel Club Dog Show, the third occasion it was awarded to a member of that breed. It was the first show that Barkentine had been entered into as an adult.

== Early life ==
Barkentine was born in Brookline, Massachusetts in July 1920. His owner and breeder was Frederic C. Newton, who had also bred Barkentine's mother and grandmother.

== Show history ==
Whilst a puppy, he was entered in two shows held by the Airedale Club of New England, winning the prize for Best Puppy on both occasions. At the age of 20 months, he was entered into the Westminster Kennel Club Dog Show in his first appearance in adult classes. He first won in the novice category for his breed, qualifying and then taking the title of best dog of his breed and then the Best of Breed title, taking the Airedale Club of America's Airedale Bowl Trophy. He went on to compete in, and win, the James Mortimer Memorial Trophy for best American dog in the show.

Then came the Best in Show round. Barkentine competed against a field of fifteen other dogs, including several past Best of Breed winners and an Australian Shepherd which had been shipped from Europe specifically to take part in the show. Ch. Lansdown Sunflower, the Greyhound runner-up from the previous year, and Best in Show at forty nine other mixed breed shows, was amongst those competing for the title. Eight dogs remained after the first cut, including both Barkentine and another Airedale, who were judged together. Other dogs still in which a chance included a Chow Chow named Li Ping Tow and the German Shepherd Dog Dolf von Dusternbrook. The Scottish Terrier Jeannie Deans was eliminated from contention after she tried to bite the German Shepherd. A second cut was made, and it went down to Boxwood Barkentine and Lansdown Sunflower, who remained in the center of the ring as the three judges made their decision. A hurried discussion between the judges was held and was only broken when Mr Muss-Arnot took the winners ribbon from an official and handed it to Barkentine's handler to announce the winner. The Airedale proved a popular choice and the crowd signaled their approval.

At the Boston show later in the same month as his win at Westminster, he was beaten by the Wire Fox Terrier Hard Cider in the American bred dogs category. He was beaten once again by Hard Cider in the Best in Show Round. At the Baltimore show in March, Barkentine was defeated for Best in Show by International Weather, an Old English Sheepdog he had beaten in the Best in Show round at Westminster.

He won the Airedale Club of America's Airedale Bowl once more at the Eastern Dog Show in 1923.
