= Kenmare Sorceress =

Ch. Kenmare Sorceress
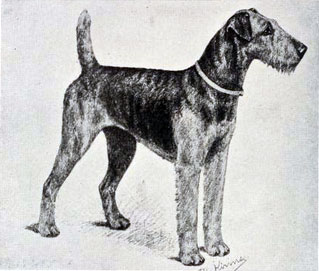
- Species: Canis lupus familiaris
- Breed: Airedale Terrier
- Sex: Female
- Born: 22 September 1909; Wales
- Occupation: Show dog
- Title: Best In Show at the Westminster Dog Show
- Term: 1912–1913
- Predecessor: Ch. Tickle Em Jock (Scottish Terrier)
- Successor: Ch. Strathtay Prince Albert (Bulldog)
- Owner: William P. Wolcott
- Offspring: Ch. Bothwell Sorceress
- Height: 1 m (3 ft 3 in)

Ch. Kenmare Sorceress (1909–1920), an Airedale Terrier, was the first of its breed to have won the Westminster Kennel Club Dog Show, in 1912. She was originally from Wales, but was imported into the United States by William P. Wolcott in September 1910.

== Early life ==
Born in Wales and bred by a bricklayer, Sorceress was purchased by William P. Wolcott of Readville, Massachusetts and imported into the United States at just over one year old in September 1910.

== Show history ==
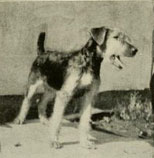
Ch. Bothwell Sorceress, daughter of Kenmare Sorceress, at the age of three months

Following her arrival in the United States, Sorceress was shown frequently at conformation shows around the country. In 1911, the Airedale Terrier Club of New England offered a new trophy, called the "Airedale Terrier Club of New England Shield" for the best dog or bitch owned by a member. It was awarded for the first time in 1912, to Kenmare Sorceress.

The most valuable trophy offered by the club was the "Champion the New King Bowl", given to the best dog or bitch in the show. Kenmare Sorceress won this trophy on the second occasion it was awarded, at the second annual show of the club in November 1912 beating imports Abbey King Nobbler and Abbey King Magic, thought to be the best of their breed from England. In addition at the second annual show, Kenmare Sorceress' daughter Bothwell Sorceress made her debut and was described as the "sensation of the show". The "Airedale Bowl" was awarded at several dog shows each year by the Airedale Club of America, and Kenmare Sorceress won the trophy twice in 1911 and twice again in 1912.

=== Westminster ===
In 1912, she was entered in the Westminster Kennel Club Dog Show. The New York Times reported that of the time of entry, she was yet to be beaten in the show ring. She was named Best in Show, winning the Spratt Trophy. W. Rutherford's Fox Terrier Ch. Warren Distinct was named as the reserve. In addition at the same show, she also won the Dogs in America Plate and the International Dogs Silver Cup.
