= Barberryhill Bootlegger =

Sealyham Terrier

- Ch. Barberryhill Bootlegger
- Species: Dog
- Sex: Male
- Born: December 31, 1920; Pride's Crossing, Massachusetts
- Nationality: American
- Occupation: Show dog
- Title: Best in Show winner, Westminster Kennel Club Dog Show
- Term: 1924
- Predecessor: Boxwood Barkentine (1922)
- Successor: Governor Moscow (1925)
- Owner: Bayard Warren
- Parents: Ch. Barberryhill Gin Rickey (sire); Western Wistful (dam)

Ch. Barberryhill Bootlegger was a Sealyham Terrier and the 1924 best in show winner at the Westminster Kennel Club Dog Show. He was born December 31, 1920, to breeder and owner Bayard Warren, in Pride's Crossing, Massachusetts. This was the first Westminster held under the newly revised rules for judging group and best in show winners. Paul E. Lockwood described the dog as "a Massachusetts Yankee of backwoods stock" Walter H. Reeves, who judged the show along with Norman Swire, said that Bootlegger "comes very close to perfection ... [he] is beautifully built, teems with type and moves like a piece of machinery." Bootlegger had previously drawn attention at an all-terriers show held by seven major American breed clubs, where he was the top American bred dog.
