= Signal Circuit of Halleston =

- Species: Dog
- Breed: Wire Fox Terrier
- Sex: Male
- Born: August 11, 1923
- Nationality: English
- Occupation: Show dog
- Title: Best in Show winner, Westminster Kennel Club Dog Show
- Term: 1926
- Predecessor: Governor Moscow (1925)
- Successor: Pinegrade Perfection (1927)
- Owners: Mr. and Mrs. Robert J. Halle
- Parents: Fountain Crusader (sire); Peri (dam)

Signal Circuit of Halleston was a Wire Fox Terrier and winner of the 1926 Westminster Kennel Club Dog Show. This was the 50th Westminster show, and the fourth Fox Terrier to win best in show.

Signal Circuit was one of 200 Fox Terriers present at the show. He was handled by Percy Roberts, who had imported the dog from England and had "just stepped off the boat before the show". The show was judged by Wintrhop Rutherford, the owner of Conejo Wycollar Boy, a Fox Terrier that took best in show from 1907 to 1909.

Signal Circuit was described as having "phenomenal length of head and sound movement".
