= Torums Scarf Michael =

Show dog

Ch. Torum's Scarf Michael
- Other names: Mick, Mike
- Species: Canis lupus familiaris
- Breed: Kerry Blue Terrier
- Sex: Male
- Born: 29 May 1996; Liverpool, England
- Died: 3 October 2011 (aged 15)
- Occupation: Show dog
- Title: Best In Show at the Westminster Dog Show, Crufts and the AKC/Eukanuba National Invitational Championship
- Owner: Marilu Hansen
- Parents: Ch. Arranshire Pioneer (sire); Ch. Dasumnaco Quieter (dam)

Ch. Torum's Scarf Michael (aka Mick or Mike) (29 May 1996 – 3 October 2011) in Liverpool, England, was a Kerry Blue Terrier who is best known for being the 2000 Best in Show winner at Crufts, and 2003 Best in Show of the Westminster Kennel Club Dog Show. He is the first dog to win the "Triple Crown" of dog shows, having also won the 2002 AKC/Eukanuba National Invitational Championship.

== Early life ==
Mick was born on 29 May 1996, to Ch. Dasumianco Quietner and sired by Ch. Arranshire Pioneer. His breeder was Ron Ramsay.

== Show history ==
Ch. Torum's Scarf Michael, already a UK Champion titleholder, was entered into the 2000 Crufts dog show at the Birmingham NEC in the UK, as one of over 20,000 dogs competing. He was named Best in Show, while the English Cocker Spaniel Sh Ch. Wiljana Waterfall won reserve place. Mick and his owner were presented with the Crufts Best in Show trophy by Prince Michael of Kent and the Chairman of the Kennel Club, Peter James. It was the final Crufts competition prior to the relaxation of UK border controls, which would allow animals to more easily cross borders with the British Government's Pet passport scheme.

Following his victory at Crufts, his owner thought he would retire Mick from show competition as he did not think he could have a more successful year than the one the dog had in 2000. Mick had won five Best in Show titles, and two Reserve Best in Shows, and was ranked as the top Terrier in the UK. However, instead of retiring him, breeder and owner Ron Ramsay sold Mick overseas to send the dog to America. He was purchased by Marilu Hansen, of Newton, New Jersey.

=== America and Westminster ===
Ch. Torum's Scarf Michael, having earned his American championship title, won the 2002 AKC/Eukanuba National Invitational Championship, winning a $50,000 prize. He was entered in the 2001 Westminster Kennel Club Dog Show, and after winning the breed group, he took the Terrier group. However, he did not win the title of Best in Show, the Bichon Frise Ch. Special Times Just Right taking the title instead.

At the Westminster Kennel Club Show in 2002, Mick won the Terrier Group again and reached the Best in Show round as the favourite. He was one of only two returning group winners from the previous year, the other being the Schnauzer Ch. Charisma Jailhouse Rock. However, his composure broke during the round, and the crowd inside Madison Square Garden distracted him sufficiently that despite him being ranked the number one dog in the United States at the time, the Miniature Poodle Ch. Surrey Spice Girl was named the winner. The New York Times described the upset as "not quite of New England Patriots proportion but not far from it". The handler of Surrey Spice Girl, Kaz Hosaka, said of Mick, "I thought he'd win, I'm surprised."

In 2003, Mick competed in the Westminster show once more alongside 2,602 other dogs. At the time of his entry, he was once more the favourite to win, having won 116 championship ribbons since moving from Britain to the United States. After winning his breed group once more, he won the Terrier Group for the third time in succession, qualifying once more for the Best in Show round. Irene Biven judged the final round, in front of over 10,000 spectators. Lining up with Mick was the German Shepherd Ch. Kismets Sight for Sore Eyes, the Standard Poodle Ch. Ale Kai Mikimoto On Fifth, the Pekingese Ch. Yakee Leaving Me BreathlessAtFranshaw, the Newfoundland Ch. Darbydale's All Rise Pouchcove, the Brittany Ch. Magic Sir-ly You Jest and the Ibizan Hound Ch. Luxor's Playmate of the Year. Mick was named the Best in Show, causing his handler, Bill McFadden, to burst into tears as Biven pointed towards the pair. His victory sealed his "Triple Crown", becoming the first dog to be Best in Show at Crufts, Westminster, and the AKC National Championship.

== Legacy ==
Mick was credited with raising the profile of the Kerry Blue Terrier in the United States due to his victory at Westminster. He was called the "most influential Kerry Blue alive" in 2008 by The New York Times. Sixty one of his children have gone on to qualify as show champions, and his sperm has been frozen for artificial insemination in the future.

== Pedigree ==
Ch. Louisburgh Danny Boy
Louisburgh Dixie
Louisburgh Dooeega
Ch. Arranshire Pioneer
Ch. Torum's Mr Dooley
Shillelagh Firy Charm
Ch. Shandon Krollyblu
Ch. Torum's Scarf Michael
Again Hazel
Ch. Magnificent Milligan
Hazel Lady
Ch. Dasumianco Quietner
Ch. Kevanna Blue Ted
Ch. Lescareiot Quietner
Torum More Than a Match
