= Felicity's Diamond Jim =

American show dog

Ch. Felicity's Diamond Jim
- Other name: James
- Species: Canis lupus familiaris
- Breed: English Springer Spaniel
- Sex: Male
- Born: June 8, 2000; Fairfax Station, Virginia
- Died: May 6, 2011 (aged 10)
- Occupation: Show dog Therapy dog
- Title: Best In Show at the Westminster Dog Show
- Term: 2007–2008
- Predecessor: Ch. Rocky Top's Sundance Kid (Colored Bull Terrier)
- Successor: Ch. K-Run's Park Me In First (Beagle)
- Owners: Terri Patton & Al Patton Ruth Dehmel and Diana Hadsall
- Parents: Ch. Telltale Davey Jones (Sire); Ch. Rendition Autumnfire Poppy (Dam)
- Offspring: Ch. Cerise Jesse James; Ch. Shore Right on the Mark ("Marquis"); Winston Henderson (August 17, 2007 – September 17, 2021)
- Awards: 51 best-in-show wins

Ch. Felicity's Diamond Jim, CD, RE (June 8, 2000 – May 6, 2011), commonly known as James, was an English Springer Spaniel. He was the 2007 Best In Show winner at the Westminster Dog Show. It was his 51st Best in Show victory, and his last, as his owners chose to retire James after the win to focus him on his work as a certified therapy dog. He was handled exclusively by the same handler who took Ch. Salilyn 'N Erin's Shameless to a best-in-show at Westminster in 2000. In retirement he was recognised in 2008 by the English Springer Spaniel Field Trial Association for his work as a sire and has produced many champion offspring, including Ch. Cerise Jesse James, as well as a loving family companion, Winston Henderson.

== Biography ==
He was bred by Felicity English Springer Spaniels of Fairfax Station, Virginia. James, a symmetrically balanced liver and white dog, was born June 8, 2000. He was owned by Terri Patton and Al Patton and was the #1 Sporting Dog in 2006 (#2 all breeds), exclusively handled by Kellie Fitzgerald.

Following his win at Westminster he was retired as a show dog to become an obedience and therapy dog.

=== Breeding ===
James was the English Springer Spaniel Field Trial Association Runner Up Show Sire of the Year in 2008. His offspring include Ch. Cerise Jesse James who won an Award of Merit at the Westminster Kennel Club Dog Show in 2008 and 2009.

== Showing ==
At the Western Pennsylvania Kennel Association show, he placed first in the Sporting Group, defeating Ch. Lamar's Bentley, an American Cocker Spaniel and Ch. Snowshoe's Kiss for Luck, a Golden Retriever. However he lost out to Ch. Old Iron Margaret River, an Airedale Terrier for Best In Show. On December 3, 2006 in Long Beach, California he won best-in-show at the AKC National Championship, defeating 2,500 other dogs including his rival Ch. Hobergays Fineus Fogg. Fineus, a Dandie Dinmont Terrier co-owned by comedian Bill Cosby, was the only dog with more career points in the circuit at this time. The prize money was $68,000 and a variety of dog related products for James.

James was entered into the 2007 Westminster Kennel Club Dog Show where he was considered a strong contender by the media, being described as a "celebrity at the peak of his game". Being handled by Kellie Fitzgerald, he won his breed, group and then went on to compete for best-in show on February 13. He once again faced off against Ch. Hobergays Fineus Fogg, who had won the Terrier group earlier. Other competitors for best-in-show included a pair of Poodles, a Petit Basset Griffon Vendeen, plus an Akita and a Bouvier des Flandres that were owned by a husband and wife competing against each other. Felicity's Diamond Jim was named the winner, giving a second win at Westminster to his handler who had also won in 2000 with Ch. Salilyn 'N Erin's Shameless, another English Springer Spaniel.
