= Sabine Rarebit =

Ch. Sabine Rarebit
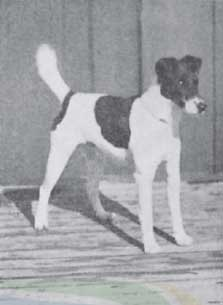
- Species: Dog
- Breed: Smooth-coated Fox Terrier
- Sex: Male
- Nationality: American
- Title: Best in show winner, Westminster Kennel Club Dog Show
- Term: 1910
- Predecessor: Warren Remedy
- Successor: Tickle Em Jock
- Parents: Sabine Ruler (sire); Sabing Fab (dam)

Ch. Sabine Rarebit was a best in show winner at the Westminster Kennel Club Dog Show in 1910. He was a Smooth-coated fox terrier considered to be "not only the best fox terrier out, but, in the opinion of many judges, the best ever bred."
