= Matford Vic =

Ch. Matford Vic
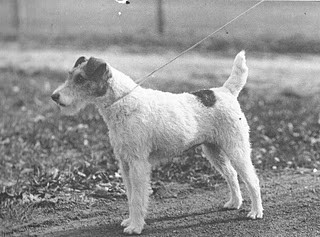
- Species: Canis lupus familiaris
- Breed: Wire Fox Terrier
- Sex: Female
- Born: 1912
- Occupation: Show dog
- Title: Best In Show at the Westminster Dog Show
- Term: 1915–1916
- Predecessor: Ch. Slumber (Old English Sheepdog)
- Successor: Ch. Conejo Wycollar Boy (Wire Fox Terrier)
- Owner: George W. Quintard
- Parent: Short Circuit (sire)

Ch. Matford Vic (1912–??), a Wire Fox Terrier, was best known for being one of only five dogs to have won the Westminster Kennel Club Dog Show on more than one occasion. She was originally purchased for the sum of £2 before changing hands twice prior to winning Best in Show at Westminster for the first time in 1915.

== Early life ==
Vic was purchased from an English barnyard for the sum of £2. Upon bringing the dog home, her first owner tried to give it to each of his two sons, who told him that they did not want that kind of dog.

Vic was brought along to a dog show where her owner was showing his Cocker Spaniels. A terrier fancier happened to catch sight of the dog and said to him "That is a fine dog that you have there. Why don't you exhibit it here?" He entered the dog in the classes, and Vic would end up winning her classes. An offer of $500 was made for Vic, which was turned down but eventually a higher offer of $1,000 was made, and the dog changed hands, being sold to Mr. H Trimble. George W. Quintard's agent then purchased the dog, along with another named Ruby Dazzler for the sum of $5,000 which brought them to the United States.

== Show history ==
The first show of the Wire Fox Terrier Association of the United Kingdom was held at the Corn Exchange, Leicester, England on 28 October 1913. The prize for "Best Exhibit in Show" was won by Matford Vic, being handled by her second owner, Mr H. Trimble. She was sold shortly afterwards.

Vic travelled to America several months before the Westminster competition in 1914. She had an unbeaten record and had won a major competition at Boston. Following a win in the Wire Fox Terrier Bitch class, she was paired with the winner of the Dog class, Vickery Fast Freight, and was eliminated. Vickery Fast Freight would end up placing third, with former champion Bulldog Strathtay Prince Albert placing second to new champion best in show Slumber, an Old English Sheepdog.

In June 1914, she became best in show at the annual Ladies' Kennel Association of America at the Mineola Fairgrounds. However her 1914 would end in defeat in late December as she was beaten into reserve by a Japanese Spaniel named Omija at the annual show of the Toy Spaniel Club of America. It caused a considerable amount of surprise as Vic was much favoured for the win as earlier in the year at a show in Albany, she had beaten Omija. An impression was made that the judges were influenced in their choice as while a part of the show, Fox Terriers don't come under the designation of a toy dog.

In 1915, Vic was entered in the Westminster Kennel Club Dog Show. She was first judged best Fox Terrier before going on to become Best in Show for her owner George W. Quintard. Quintard would also win "Best Reserve" with Wireboy of Paignton. Wireboy and Vic also won the "Brace Special" before teaming with Ruby Dazzler and Holmbury Reve to win the "Best Team Special". Following her victory at Westminster, she was expected to be entered at the show in Devon, however she was held back so that Wireboy of Paignton would have the opportunity of gaining the honor. In the end, Wireboy placed best in show, with Holmbury Reve placing in reserve. The show was noted for the members of the Sealyham Terrier Club withdrawing their entries following the election of Mrs. Marie Willets as a judge, even though Mrs. Willets was the first person in America to own a Sealyham Terrier. She lost at the Ladies' Kennel Association of America show to another Fox Terrier, Vickery Gypsy Moth, and even lost in her own breed class to Vickery Greenbank Selection.

For her victory in 1916, Vic's breed was judged by Winthrop Rutherford. Rutherford was the owner of Warren's Remedy, a Smooth Fox Terrier who won the Westminster on three occasions previously. Vic repeated her successes of 1915, taking the "Brace Special" again with Wireboy of Paignton again and with Wireboy, Ruby Dazzler and Holmbury Reve for the "Best Team Special".
