= Championship =

Competition

In sport, a championship is a competition in which the aim is to decide which individual or team is the champion.

== Championship systems ==
Various forms of competition can be referred to by the term championship.

=== Title match system ===
In this system, a competitor has to challenge the current champion to win the championship. A competitor (called number 1 contender) can challenge the current champion after defeating other challengers. This form of championship is used in individual head-to-head competitions and is particularly associated with combat sports such as wrestling, boxing and mixed martial arts.

=== Tournament system ===
The term championships (in the plural) is often used to refer to tournament competitions, either using a knockout format, such as at Wimbledon and other championships in tennis, or a mixed format with a group stage followed by knockout rounds, such as used in the European Football Championships.

A variation of the knockout format is the "best-of-X" or series format where two teams face each other for a specified number of times until one team wins the majority of specified games, most of the time the remaining games are not played anymore; only then is the losing team eliminated from contention and the winning team advances to the next level. This format is predominant in American sports such as baseball, ice hockey and basketball, and on test cricket.

=== League system ===
Championships in various sports, including rugby union and soccer use a league system in which all competitors in the league play each other, either once or a number of times. This is also known as a round robin system.

=== Hybrid systems ===
Some competitions use a hybrid system that combines traits of two or more of these systems.

==== Tournament of Champions system ====
The game show Jeopardy! uses a title match system during regular play, then holds a Tournament of Champions with the longest-running champions under the title match system that operates on a tournament system to determine that season's "Grand Champion". This type of system works best in competitions with numerous competitions in a short period of time (game shows such as Jeopardy!, in particular, fit this description, since there are five new title matches every week).

==== Playoff system ====
In many sport leagues, a playoff system is used to determine a championship winner. Teams compete in a regular season of varying formats and a limited number of teams qualify for playoffs. Although this system is mostly identified with the United States and Canada, it is frequently found in other North American countries, and is also standard in sports influenced by North America (e.g. basketball, baseball, ice hockey) as well as most football codes other than soccer. The playoffs (known in some countries, notably Australia, as the "finals series") are a tournament where teams play head-to-head in knockout competition. The championship is often considered the final of the playoffs (e.g., Super Bowl, Stanley Cup Finals, NBA Finals, World Series, etc.). The playoff system can be seen as a hybrid between the league system and tournament system, where a league is used to determine qualifiers for the tournament.

In the NFL, the term "Championship game" is used to refer to the matches which decide the champions of each of the two conferences, the NFC (NFC Championship Game) and AFC (AFC Championship Game). These games are effectively semi-finals as they determine the two competitors in the Super Bowl. The quirk in naming stems from when the NFC and AFC were separate leagues with a respective NFL Championship and AFL Championship, the winners of which would in the AFL's later years meet in the World Championship, now known as the Super Bowl.

=== Season system ===
In sports such as motor racing, a season consists of a number of individual races, with points being awarded for finishing in the top positions. At the end of the season, the driver/team with the most points wins the championship. Examples include Formula 1 and the World Rally Championship.

== See also ==
- Championship (professional wrestling)
- Championship (dog)
