= Dhandys Favorite Woodchuck =

Ch. Dhandy's Favorite Woodchuck, also known as Chucky, was a male pug who was named the 1981 Best In Show winner at the Westminster Kennel Club Dog Show. He is the first and only pug to win Best in Show. He was owned by Robert Hauslohner, a Philadelphia lawyer and a trustee and treasurer of the Philadelphia Museum of Art.
