= K-Run's Park Me In First =

Champion show dog

Ch. K-Run's Park Me In First
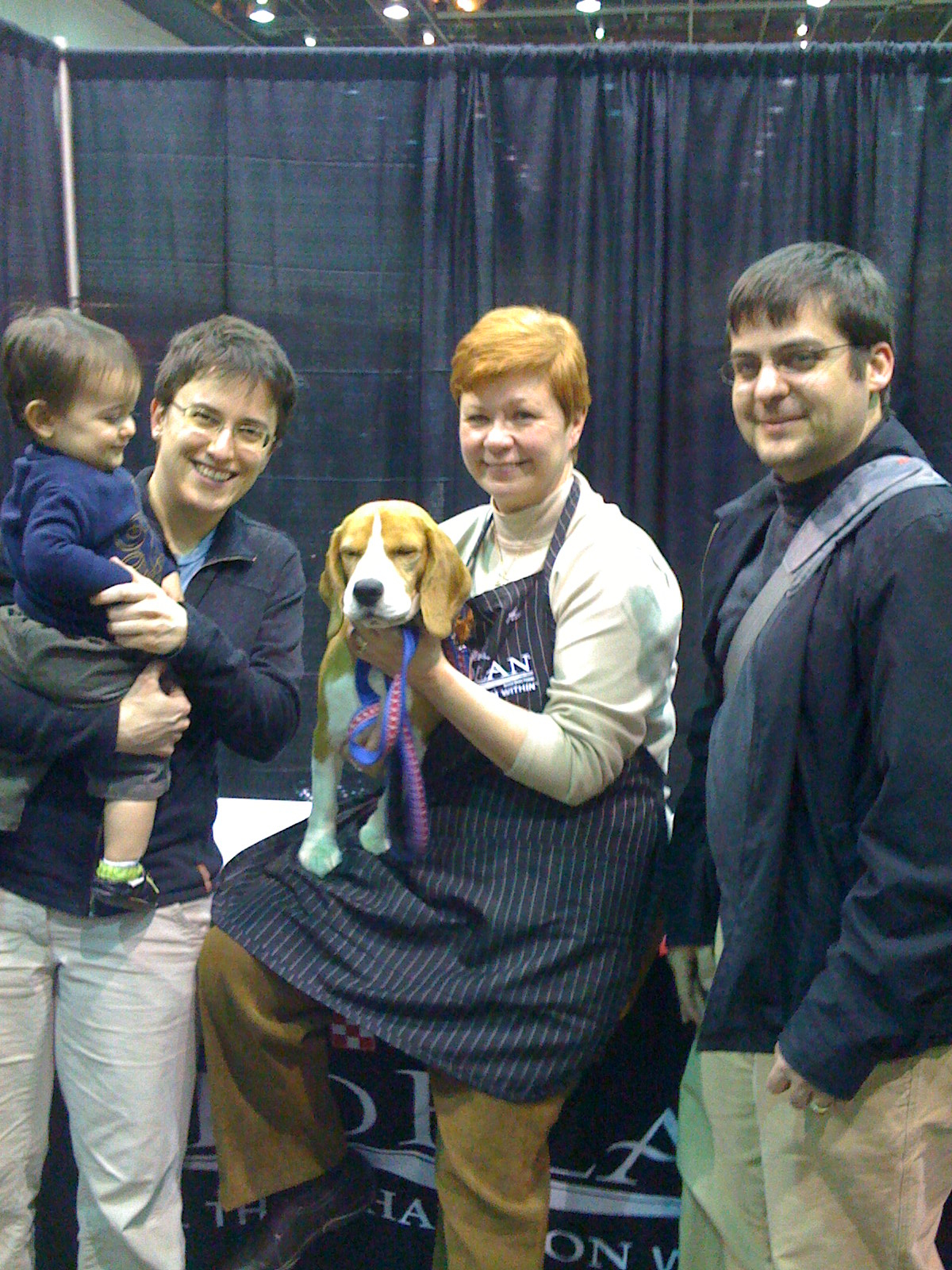
- K-Run's Park Me In First aka Uno
- Other name: Uno
- Species: Canis lupus familiaris
- Breed: Beagle
- Sex: Male
- Born: May 5, 2005; Belleville, Illinois
- Died: September 20, 2018 (aged 13); Austin, Texas
- Nationality: American
- Notable role: Conformation show dog
- Title: Best In Show at the Westminster Dog Show
- Term: 2008
- Predecessor: Ch. Felicity's Diamond Jim (English Springer Spaniel)
- Successor: Ch. Clussexx Three D Grinchy Glee (Sussex Spaniel)
- Owner: Caroline Dowell

Ch. K-Run's Park Me In First, also known as Uno (May 5, 2005 – September 20, 2018) was a 15-inch (380 mm) beagle from Belleville, Illinois, who won Best in Show in the 2008 Westminster Kennel Club dog show. He was the first beagle to claim the top prize at Westminster and the first beagle to win the hound group since 1939.

== Early life ==
Uno was born amongst a litter of four puppies in the garage of the house of Kathy Weichert in Belleville, Illinois.

== Show career ==
In 2008, Uno was entered in the Westminster Kennel Club dog show in New York City having been ranked the sixth best dog based on show results in the United States during 2007. While at the competition, he was handled by Aaron Wilkerson, and competed against a field of 2,626 other dogs. Uno won his breed group, and subsequently became the first beagle of any size to win the Hound Group since 1939. Judge Ralph Lemcke said that Uno was "one of the best hounds I've ever seen".

This qualified Uno for the Best in Show round at Westminster, where he was competing against a toy Poodle, a standard Poodle, a Sealyham Terrier, an Australian Shepherd, an Akita and a Weimaraner. The judge, Dr. J. Donald Jones, took three minutes to make his decision and pointed to Uno, naming him the first beagle to ever become Best in Show at the Westminster Kennel Club dog show. This was ahead of Uno's third birthday during the following May.

== Post Show Career ==
Following his win at Westminster, Uno was retired from show competition as there were concerns that small show judges might deliberately overlook him for best in show prizes because of his victory. Instead the intention was to use him to breed, but this was temporarily postponed by his owner because of the level of attention that Uno was receiving from the press and the public.

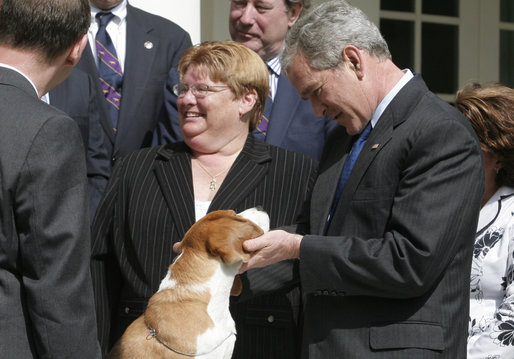
President George W. Bush with Uno in May 2008

Uno and his owner were invited to the White House to meet President George W. Bush. While there, he was given a collar by First Lady Laura Bush. Uno was the first Westminster champion to be invited to celebrate victory with the President.

Uno was at Miller Park on July 12, 2008, to participate in the first pitch during a matchup between the Milwaukee Brewers and the Cincinnati Reds. He also attended a home game for the St. Louis Cardinals, again to help throw the first pitch. He attended that year's Macy's Thanksgiving Day Parade; where he rode in the Snoopy float.

In honor of Uno's historic victory at Westminster, his home state of Illinois named a day in March in the dog's honor.

Uno became a therapy dog following his retirement from the show ring.

== Controversy ==
In 2016, Uno was scheduled to appear live from Madison Square Garden on CNBC as part of the network's coverage of the 140th Westminster Kennel Club Dog Show. However, Uno had not been registered to attend the event and, after security personnel learned of his presence at the arena, he was barred from appearing on CNBC and was asked to leave the premises.

Later, the producer of Westminster's broadcasts called the issue a "misunderstanding".

== Personal life ==
Despite the intention to use Uno to breed, he turned out to be sterile and ultimately never sired any puppies; his owner Caroline Dowell said "it was a blessing in disguise. I just wanted him as a pet". When not traveling, the dog lived with his owner in a property near Dowell's ranch near Austin, Texas along with 40 to 50 beagles, most of which are rescued from kill shelters. She kept Uno in a small group of beagles in order to protect him, as she didn't want him hurt by the more boisterous dogs in her care.

In 2015, a relation of Uno's became the second beagle to win Best in Show at Westminster. The dog, called Tashtins Lookin For Trouble, otherwise known as Miss P, is Uno's grandniece. Prior to the 2015 event, television host David Frei described Uno as "easily the most popular Westminster winner in my 25 years".

Uno died at the age of 13 of cancer on September 20, 2018. The New York Times wrote on Uno's passing he "maintained his popularity long after other Westminster champions had been crowned but always returned home to Austin, where Dowell, a bunch of rescue beagles and a potbellied pig awaited him."
