= Slumber =

Slumber is another word for sleep.

Slumber may also refer to:

- laziness, indolence or inaction
- Slumber (dog), prize winning Old English Sheepdog
- Slumber (band) at Okeechobee Music & Arts Festival
- "Slumber", award-winning single by Christian Rock band Needtobreathe
- "Slumber", signature single of Malaysian band OAG (band)
- "Slumber", song by Die Monster Die from the album Withdrawal Method
- "Slumber", song by Elvin Jones from the album Genesis
- "Slumber", song by Bad Religion from album Punk Rock Songs
- Slumber (film), a horror film released in 2017
- Slumber, the fourth episode from the third season of Smallville, an American superhero television series
- Slumber Tsogwane (born 1959), Botswanan politician
