= Warren Remedy =

Westminster Kennel Club Dog (1907–1909)

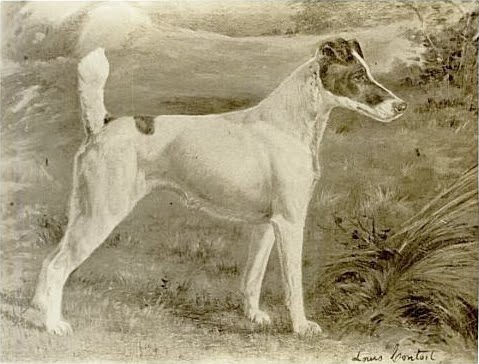
- Ch. Warren Remedy
- Species: Dog
- Breed: Smooth-coated Fox Terrier
- Sex: Female
- Born: 1905; Allamuchy Township, New Jersey
- Died: December 1912 (aged 6–7); Allamuchy Township, New Jersey
- Nationality: American
- Occupation: Show dog
- Title: Best in Show winner, Westminster Kennel Club Dog Show
- Term: 1907-1909
- Successor: Sabine Rarebit
- Owner: Winthrop Rutherford
- Parents: Sabine Resist (sire); Routon Dainty (dam)
- Weight: 20 lb (9.1 kg)

Ch. Warren Remedy (1905–1912) was a Best in Show winner of the Westminster Kennel Club Dog Show in 1907, 1908 and 1909. A smooth-coated fox terrier owned by Winthrop Rutherfurd, she was the only dog to win Westminster three years in a row.

== Early life ==
Remedy was sired by Sabine Resist from Routon Dainty. She was bred by Winthrop Rutherfurd, and brought up at the Warren Kennels in Allamuchy Township, New Jersey. Other dogs which were bred from the same pairing included Warren Drastic, Warren Deputy, Warren Vogue and Warren Rescue.

== Show career ==
The Westminster Kennel Club Dog Show introduced a Best in Show competition in 1907, the first since the show's inception in 1877. At the age of 20 months, Warren Remedy was entered in the competition and progressed through breed and group victories into the Best in Show round. She faced off against sixteen other breeds of dogs. These included the Rough Collie Squire of Tytton, who had won the Van Schaick Cup earlier in the show, and the English Sheepdog Dolly Gray, who won the Castle Gould Cup. Ten judges preceded over the Best in Show round and awarded the title to Warren Remedy. Immediately afterwards, Remedy competed once again at the show, this time for Ballyhoo Bay Challenge Cup awarded by the Ladies Kennel Association of America. A similar lineup of dogs competed for the trophy, with the exception of Squire of Tytton being replaced with the American-bred Rough Collie Mountaineer Magistrate. Remedy was expected to win this title as well, but it was instead awarded to the English Setter Deodora Prince. Later in the 1907 show season, Remedy was named Best in Show at the inaugural North Jersey Kennel Club dog show. A week after that victory and also in New Jersey, Remedy also won the award for the best dog or bitch in show at the Asbury Park dog show.

Remedy retained the Best in Show title at the Westminster Kennel Club show in 1908, and afterwards was declared to be the "best dog of her kind in America". Later in 1908, Remedy was named the best bitch in the show at the Ladies Kennel Association of America show held in Mineola, New York.

She won Westminster once again in 1909, although reports mistakenly gave her name as "Warren Rutherford". Following her victory at Westminster in 1909, Remedy competed in the New England Kennel Club Show later in the same month. There she was defeated by the Smooth Fox Terrier Sabine Fernie from the Sabine Kennels.

At the 1910 Westminster Show, Remedy was defeated in what was viewed as a surprise victory in the best Smooth Fox Terrier bitch contest by Sabine Fernie. Fernie went on to be defeated by fellow Sabine Kennel's dog, Sabine Rarebit in the best overall Smooth Fox Terrier contest. Rarebit went on to win the Best in Show title, the first time it had been awarded to a dog other than Warren Remedy.

Warren Remedy's death was reported by The New York Times on December 17, 1912. She died in the Warren Kennels on Winthrop Rutherfurd's farm in Allamuchy Township.

== Legacy ==
Warren Remedy remains the only dog to have won Best in Show at the Westminster Kennel Club Dog Show on three occasions, the most victories by any single dog. Bronze statues were later crafted of Remedy's form by Ric Chashoudian. These statues were used as awards to show dog owners for a series of awards by the Westminster Kennel Club. Likewise, crystal statues of Warren Remedy were created for the handlers of the show dogs.
