= Paul Meltsner =

American artist (1905–1966)

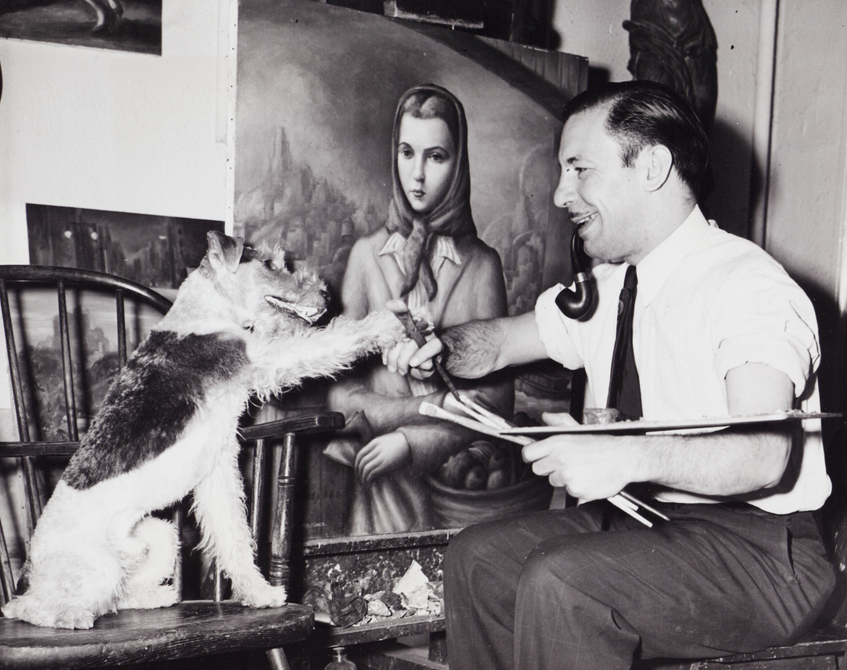
- Born: Paul Raphael Meltsner; 1905; New York City, U.S.
- Died: 1966 (aged 60–61); Woodstock, New York, U.S.
- Known for: Painting
- Movement: Social Realism

Paul Raphael Meltsner (1905–1966) was an American artist who was widely recognized for his Works Progress Administration (WPA) era paintings and lithographs, and who was later known for his iconic portraits of celebrities in the performing arts.

== Education and training ==
Paul Meltsner sold his first painting when he was eight years old to the government of Palestine for $25. He was born in New York City and attended public schools in Harlem before graduating Flushing High School in 1922. Meltsner later studied at the National Academy of Design and did illustration work for Coronet and Bachelor magazines.

== WPA era work ==
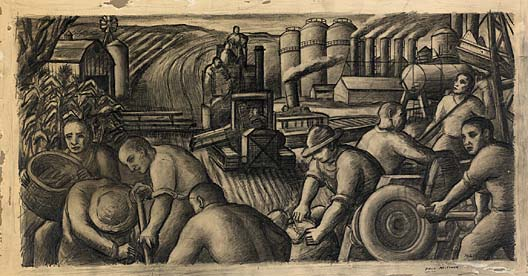
Mural study for Ohio in the collection of the Smithsonian American Art Museum

In the 1930s, Meltsner participated in the Federal Arts Project of the WPA. He toured the country in an old Ford, visiting farms and factories. His works represented the social realism that was popular with WPA artists of the time. His oil paintings portrayed rural landscapes, industrial city scapes, and laborers at work. His colors were bright and bold and his depictions were simple yet iconic.

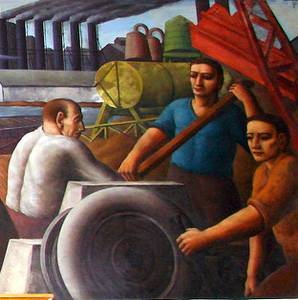
Section of mural Ohio, in the Bellevue, Ohio post office

Meltsner's 1937 mural, Ohio, in the Bellevue, Ohio post office, depicted a heroic scene of laboring Ohio farmers and factory workers and remains an exemplary specimen of the mural work that was awarded by the Department of the Treasury's Section of Painting and Sculpture.

In 1937, Meltsner painted a self-portrait titled Paul, Marcella and Van Gogh. In the work, he poses in his studio with his daughter and his wire fox terrier, holding a workman's hammer instead of a paint brush. The painting was purchased by the Luxembourg Museum in Paris, but during the German occupation of France, it was confiscated by the Nazis because Meltsner was Jewish. He painted a copy of the work in 1940, and Paul, Marcella and Van Gogh (No. 2) now hangs in the Nelson-Atkins Museum of Art in Kansas City.

In 1935, printmaking became a separate WPA unit formed for the purpose of employing artists and stimulating public interest in print collecting. The New York print shop would be the most prolific of the 16 established across the country. Because Meltsner's work was characterized by large areas of color and simplified angular lines, they were ideal for reproduction. People identified with his working class motifs and he identified with the people whom he depicted. While some social realist artists of the time were focused on exposing the injustices of industrialism, Meltsner also celebrated the workers who were part of it. Perhaps in contrast with his proletarian themes, or perhaps in concert with their vision, his lithographs were popularly received and collected by both average individuals and by museums of fine art.

== Portraits of performing artists ==
Later in his career, Meltsner turned his artistic interests to portraits of celebrities in the performing arts. His portrait of Carmen Miranda, complete with a banana hat, helped to popularize Miranda's image and was acquired by the Brazilian Government for the National Museum of Brazil in Rio de Janeiro as "representing the typical Latin American woman." Meltsner would become widely recognized for his depictions of performers in the dramatic arts also including Gypsy Rose Lee, Dorothy Stickney, Gertrude Lawrence, Lynn Fontaine, John Barrymore, Marian Anderson, and was perhaps most recognized for his multiple paintings of Martha Graham. One of Meltsner's Graham portraits is housed in the National Portrait Gallery at the Smithsonian Institution in Washington, D.C., another in the Wichita Art Museum in Wichita, Kansas, and another hangs in the National Museum of Argentina in Buenos Aires.

In 1944, Meltsner auctioned 8 portraits at the I. Magnin in Beverly Hills with the proceeds to benefit the Fifth War Loan Drive. The pictures of Albert Einstein, Gertrude Lawrence, Vera Zorina, Carmen Amaya, Lynn Fontanne, John Barrymore, Carmen Miranda and Marian Anderson brought in a combined total of $2,715,000.

== Late career and recognition ==
Collectors of Meltsner paintings during his lifetime included Frank Crowninshield, Oscar Serlin, Billy Rose, and President Franklin D. Roosevelt who hung his work in the White House.

Meltsner was a member of The Mural Painters, the Society of Independent Artists, and was a fellow at The Louis Comfort Tiffany Foundation.

Later in life, he left his downtown New York studio and settled in Woodstock, New York. There he joined an artist colony that included many of his contemporaries. He lived a simple life painting in a barn studio and did not own a phone or car. Meltsner died in Woodstock in 1966.

Meltsner paintings and lithographs are today held in the collections of the Smithsonian American Art Museum, The National Portrait Gallery, the Museum of Modern Art in New York, the Brooklyn Museum of Art, the Art Institute of Chicago, the Houston Museum of Fine Arts, the Dayton Art Institute, The Hermitage (acquired from the Museum of Modern Western Art in Moscow), the Boston Museum of Fine Arts, the Whitney Museum of American Art, the Dallas Museum of Art, the Detroit Institute of Arts, the Nelson-Atkins Museum of Art, the Wichita Art Museum, and the national art galleries of both Brazil and Argentina.
