= Best in Show =

Best in Show may refer to:

- Best in Show (film), a 2000 film written and directed by Christopher Guest
- Best in Show (Grinspoon album), 2005
- Best in Show (Jackyl album), 2012
- The Best in Show award (BIS), or the Best in Show competition, in conformation dog shows and Concours d'Elegance
  - Best in Show winners of Crufts
  - Best in Show winners of the Westminster Kennel Club Dog Show
  - Best in Show winners of the Pebble Beach Concours d'Elegance
- Best In Show – 1982 Kentucky Broodmare of the Year, dam of multiple stakes winners and stakes producers
