= Wire Fox Terrier =

Terrier dog breed originally from England

Wire fox terrier
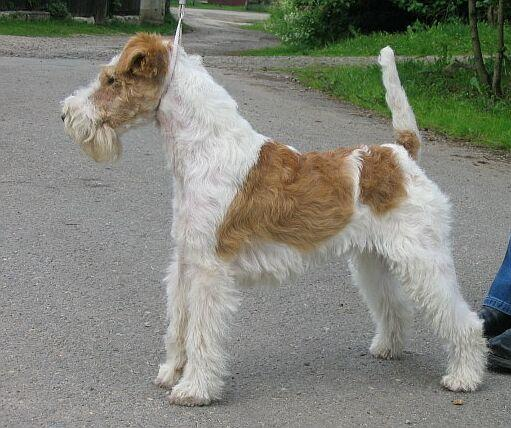
- Other names: Wire Hair Fox Terrier; Wirehaired Terrier; Fox Terrier
- Common nicknames: Wire; WFT
- Origin: England
Kennel club standards
- The Kennel Club: standard
- Fédération Cynologique Internationale: standard

The Wire Fox Terrier (also known as Wire Hair Fox Terrier, Wirehaired Terrier or simply Fox Terrier) is a breed of dog, one of many terrier breeds. It is a Fox Terrier, and although it bears a resemblance to the Smooth Fox Terrier, they are believed to have been developed separately. It originates from England.

== Appearance ==
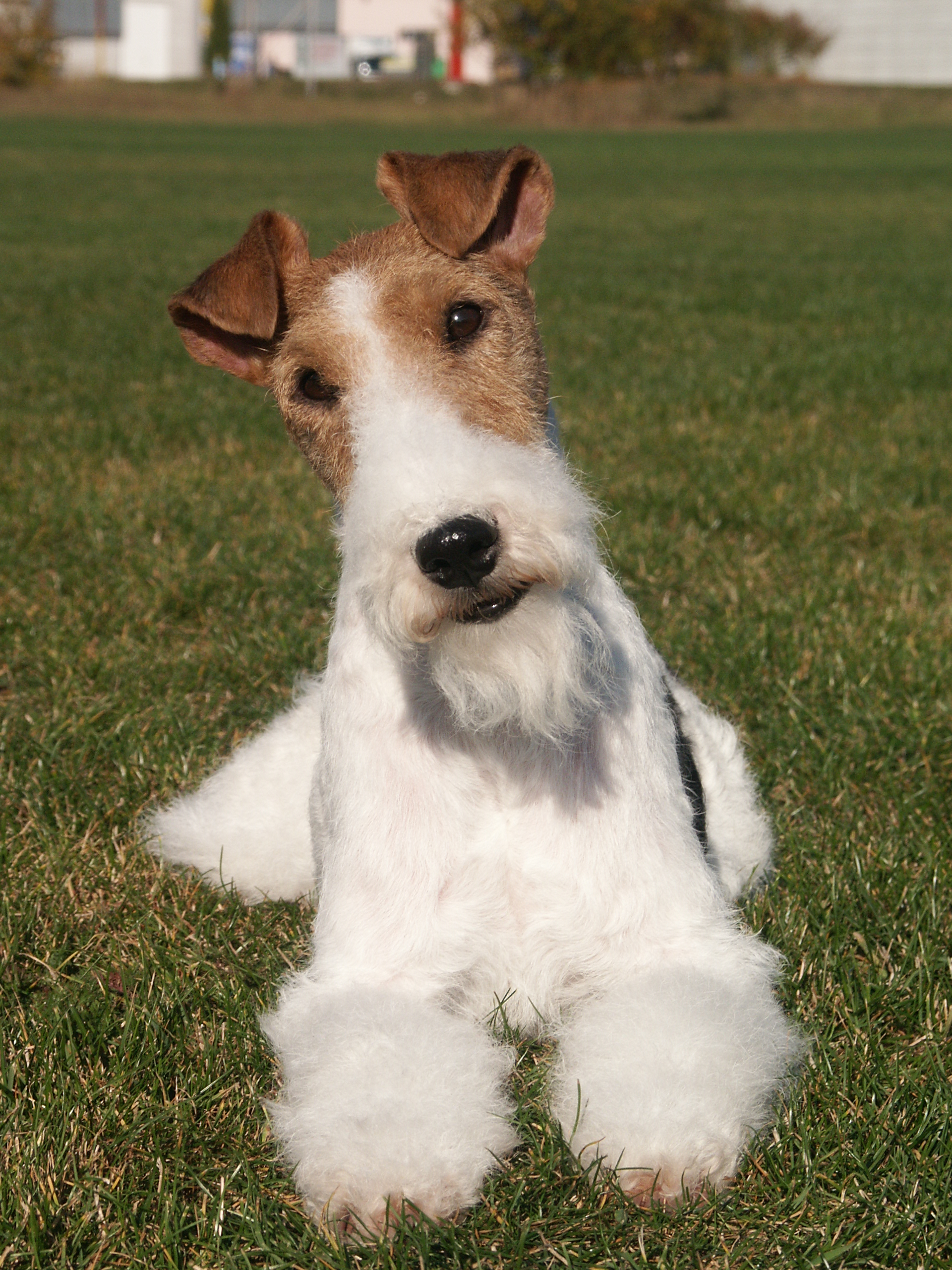
Coat colour has a predominant white base

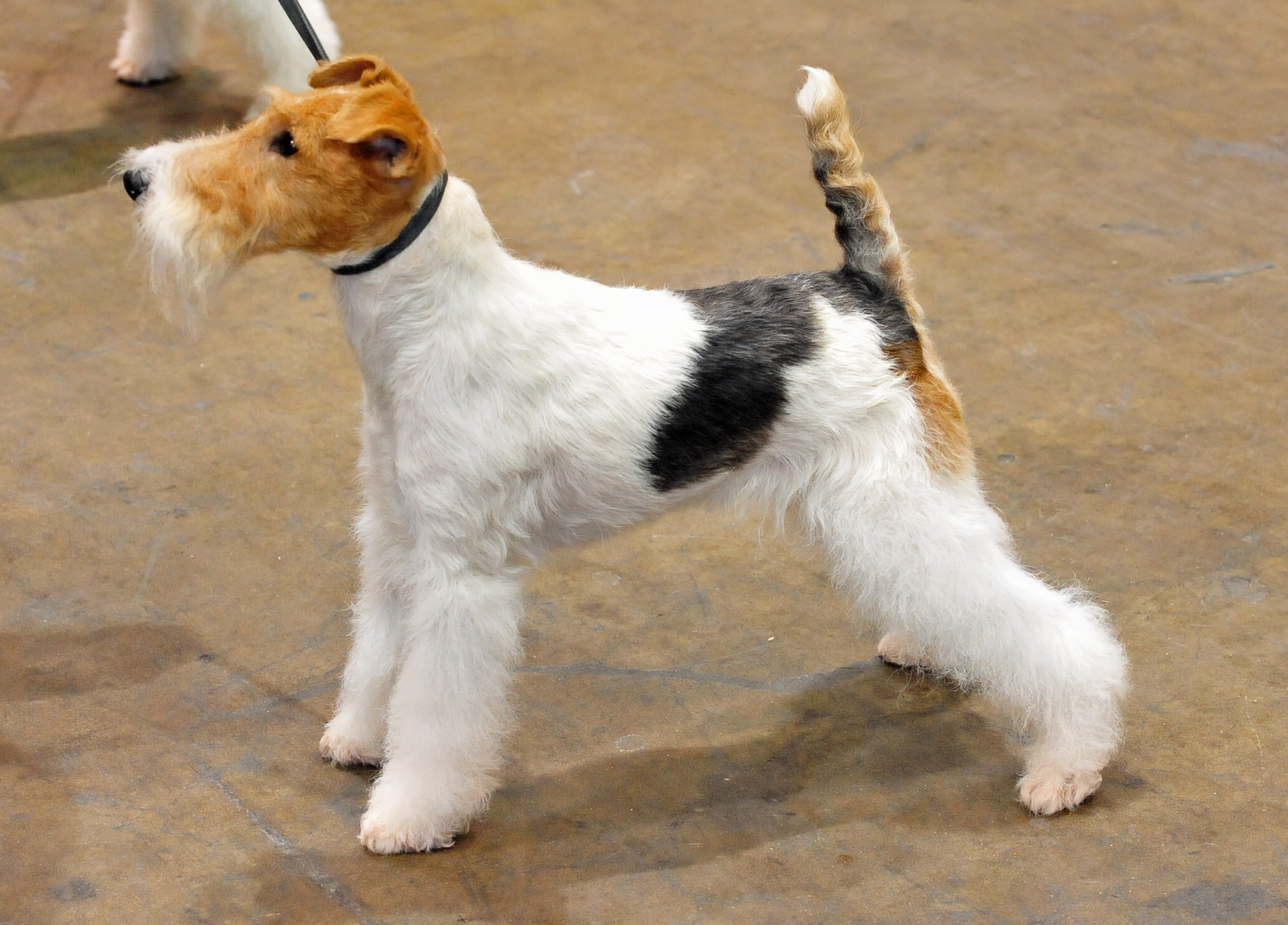
A Wire Fox Terrier with tri-colour coat

The Wire Fox Terrier is a sturdy, balanced dog weighing 7.7 to 8.6 kg (17 to 19 lb) for males and 6.8 to 7.7 kg (15 to 17 lb) for females. It should not be more than 39 cm (15 1/2 in) at the withers. Its rough, broken coat is distinctive. Coat colour consists of a predominant white base with brown markings of the face and ears, and usually a black saddle or large splotch of colour; there may be other black or brown markings on the body.

== Temperament ==
Two of the Wire Fox Terrier's most distinctive traits are its energy and intelligence. It has a low threshold for boredom and requires stimulation, exercise and attention. The Wire Fox Terrier is a companion animal that requires near-constant attention.

The dog should be alert, quick and ready to respond swiftly with enthusiasm. However, they should also be friendly, communicative, and playful if they receive the proper care and exercise. Bred to be independent thinkers, they are capable of tactical maneuvering for vermin and other sport.

Often, Wire Fox Terriers are abandoned or surrendered for reasons including running away contrary to owner command, chasing objects or other animals, and taunting or attacking other animals with the ability to cause serious damage or harm. Despite this, this is normal behavior for the Wire Fox Terrier due to their training in hunting. Ownership requires firm control, and the dog must be provided with enough exercise and diversion.

== Grooming ==
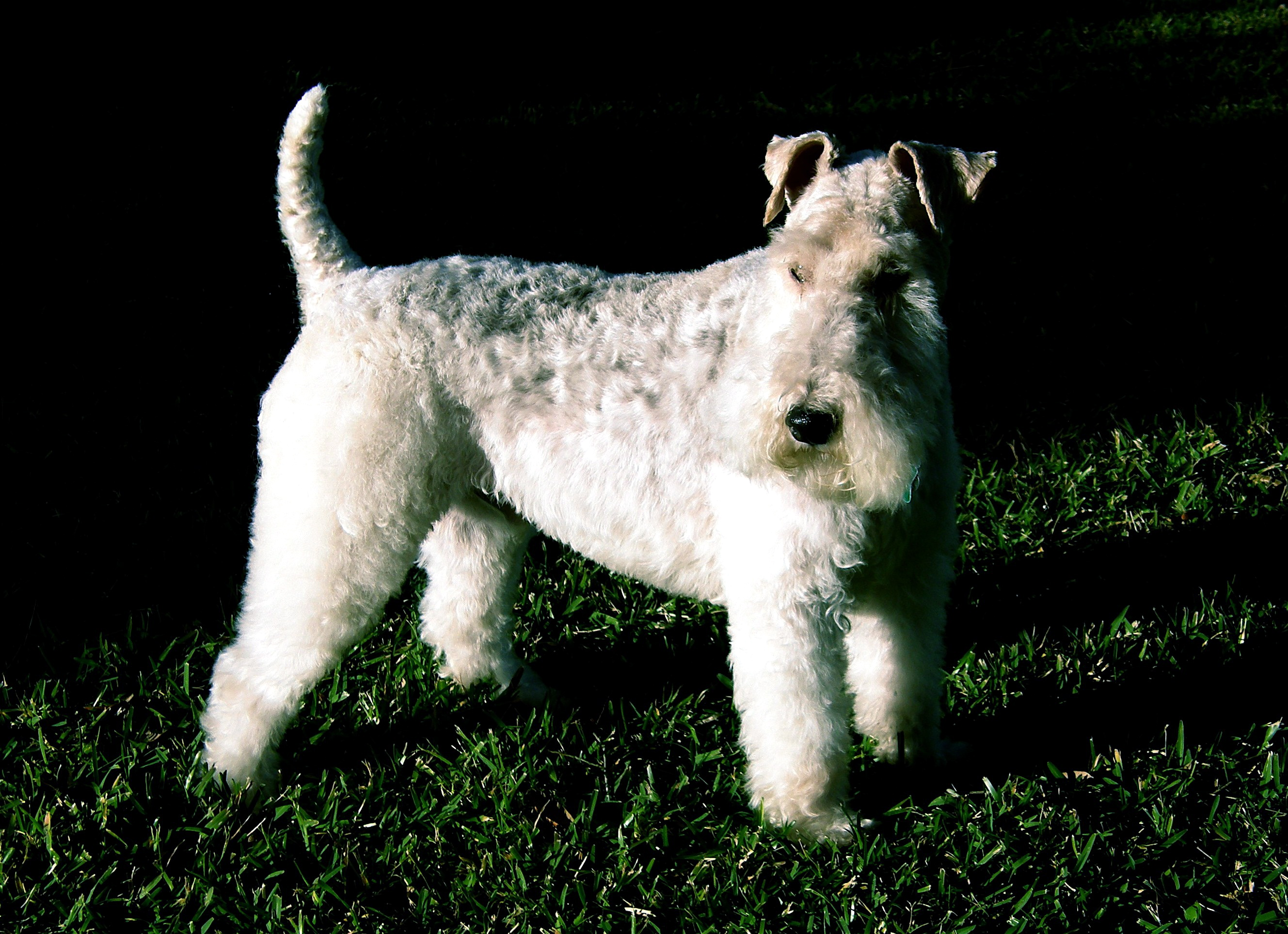
Clipped four-year-old male Wire Fox Terrier

Wire Fox Terriers kept for show are hand stripped; if the hair becomes too long, it is taken out by hand in order to preserve the colours and the glossiness of the coat. Many kept as pets are clipped monthly by a groomer. Clipping dulls the colours and makes the coat soft, curly and more difficult to keep clean, but it is preferred by many owners due to being a simpler (and cheaper) procedure than stripping.

== History ==
The Wire Fox Terrier was developed in England by fox hunting enthusiasts and is believed to be descended from a now-extinct rough-coated, black-and-tan working terrier of Wales, Derbyshire, and Durham. The breed was also thought to have been bred to chase foxes into their burrows; the dogs' short, strong, usually docked tails were used as handles by the hunter to pull them back out.

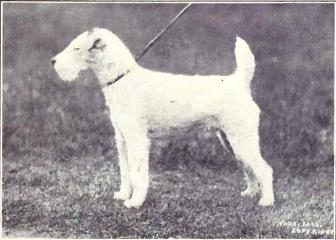
Wire Fox Terrier c. 1915

Although it is said Queen Victoria owned one, and her son and heir, King Edward VII, did own a Wire Fox Terrier named Caesar, the breed was not popular as a family pet until the 1930s, when The Thin Man series of feature films was created. Asta, the canine member of the Charles family, was a Wire Fox Terrier, and the popularity of the breed soared. Milou (Snowy) from The Adventures of Tintin comic strip is also a Wire Fox Terrier.

In the late 20th century, the popularity of the breed declined again, most likely due to changing living conditions in the Western world and the difficulty of keeping hunting terriers in cities due to their strong prey instincts.

As of 2019, the Wire Fox Terrier has the distinction of having received more Best in Show titles at Westminster Kennel Club dog shows (currently 15) than any other breed. Matford Vic, a Wire Fox Terrier, is one of only five dogs to have won the Westminster Kennel Club Dog Show on more than one occasion. She won the competition twice, in 1915 and 1916. The only dog to win it on more occasions was Warren Remedy, a Smooth Fox Terrier, who won it on three occasions between 1907 and 1909.

== Health ==
A 2024 UK study found a life expectancy of 13.5 years for the breed compared to an average of 12.7 for purebreeds and 12 for crossbreeds.

== Noteworthy Wire Fox Terriers ==
- Archie, owned by Gill Raddings Stunt Dogs, starred in ITV's Catwalk Dogs.
- Asta, from The Thin Man film series
- Beauty, awarded the Dickin Medal for conspicuous gallantry or devotion to duty while serving in military conflict.
- Bob, from the Hercule Poirot novel Dumb Witness by Agatha Christie (inspired by Christie's own Wire Fox terrier Peter).
- Bunny, from the film Hudson Hawk
- Bella, who played Snoopy in the movie Moonrise Kingdom
- Boer, the dog of Alexei Brusilov, the author of the 'Brusilov Offensive'.
- Caesar, the companion of King Edward VII of the United Kingdom
- Charles, brought to Ceylon by Leonard Woolf in 1905
- Chester, in the 1998 film Jack Frost
- Chico, dog of Albert Einstein
- Dášeňka, the dog of Czechoslovak writer and journalist Karel Čapek - also featured as the hero of his book Dášeňka čili život štěněte
- Dodger Herbie Tobacco (only a mutt in the film) from the Disney animated film Oliver & Company is actually a Wire Fox Terrier.
- Dogmatix (French: Idéfix), companion of Asterix and Obelix.
- Featherstonehaugh (pronounced 'Foon'), "a wire-haired fox terrier of irreproachable breeding" from Margery Allingham's novel Police at the Funeral.
- Guido from the film Pups United
- Ike Larue, from the Ike Larue series, written and illustrated by Mark Teague
- J.D. from the film Millionaire Dogs (1999)
- Jani, owned by Vincent Korda, mentioned by his son Michael Korda in "Alone" (2017)
- Lacey, Ch. Registry's Lonesome Dove, 1992 Best in Show winner at Westminster Dog Show
- Mickey, the companion of French composer Francis Poulenc.
- Moll, from the book Memoirs of a Fox-Hunting Man
- Montmorency, from the book Three Men in a Boat by Jerome K. Jerome
- Pan, the companion of A.L. Westgard, AAA pathfinder. Pan was the mascot of the dedication tour for the National Park to Park Highway in 1920.
- Pard, the companion of Humphrey Bogart character in the 1941 film High Sierra. Pard was played by Humphrey Bogart's own dog, Zero. It is evident in the film that Pard loves his master.
- Polly, a white rough terrier companion to Charles Darwin
- Scruffy, the Muirs' wire fox terrier on The Ghost and Mrs. Muir television series
- Skippy, canine actor in the 1930s
  - Asta, from the film adaptation of The Thin Man (the novel's breed was a Schnauzer)
  - George, from Bringing Up Baby
  - Mr. Atlas, from Topper Takes a Trip
  - Mr. Smith, from The Awful Truth
- Sky, winner of the 2012 Purina Thanksgiving Dog Show and the 2014 Westminster Dog Show.
- Snowy (French: Milou), companion of Tintin
- Topsy, the dog of actress Diana Napier while married to tenor Richard Tauber.
- Van Gogh, Paul Meltsner's dog featured in his famous painting Paul, Marcella and Van Gogh
- Vicki, Rudyard Kipling's dog
- Watch, the pet and companion of The Boxcar Children, is a Wire Fox Terrier.
- Wessex, the dog of British novelist (Tess of the d'Urbervilles) Thomas Hardy
- Willy, from the film Ask the Dust
- Wuffles, the Patrician's dog in the Discworld Series

== See also ==
- List of dog breeds
- Fox Terrier, for additional details on history, genetics, coat color, etc.
