= Old English Sheepdog =

English dog breed

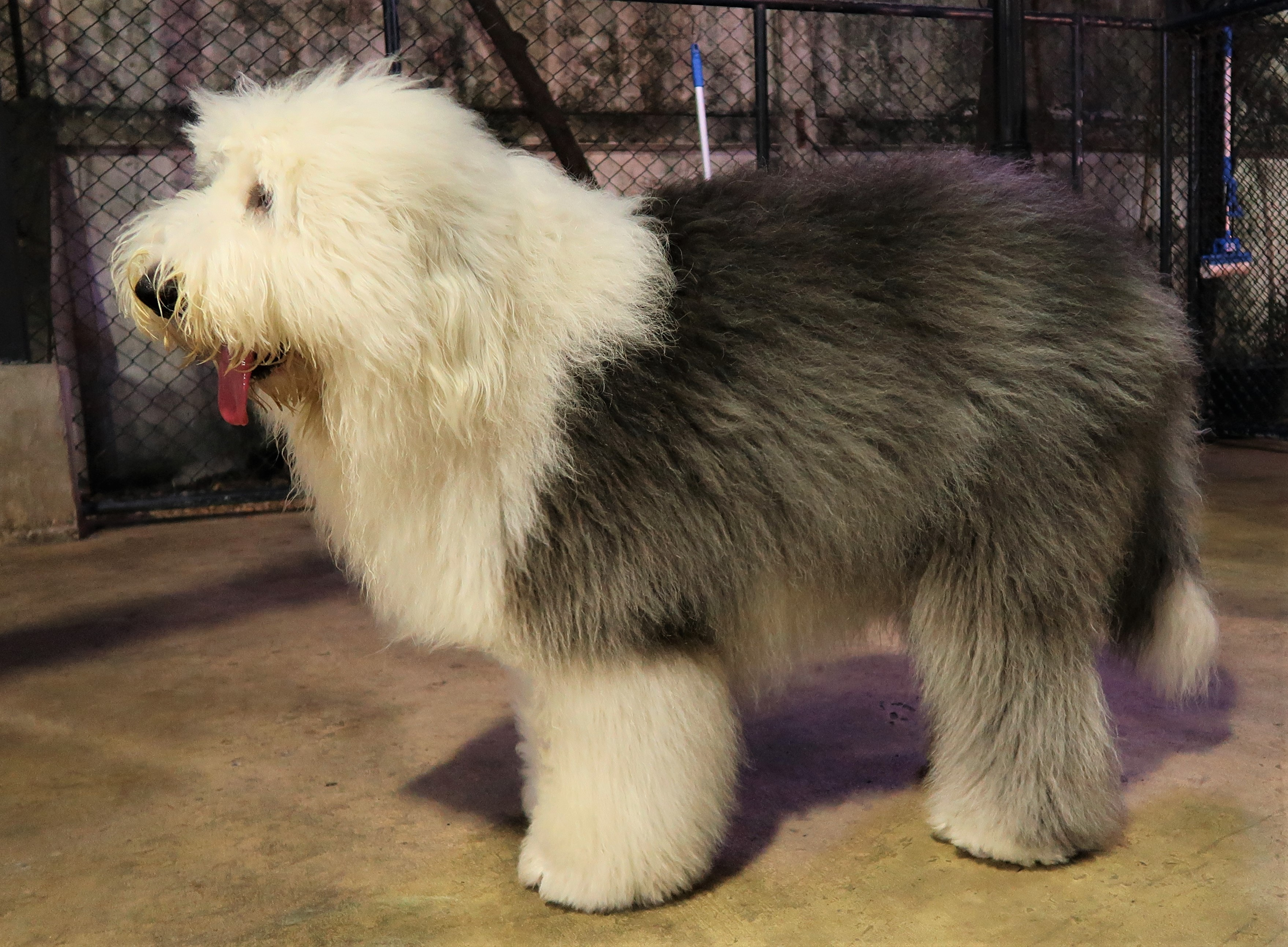
- A show-standard Old English Sheepdog
- Origin: England
Traits
Height	Males	61 centimetres (24 in) and upwards
	Females	56 centimetres (22 in) and upwards
Weight	Males	36–46 kilograms (79–101 lb)
	Females	30–40 kilograms (66–88 lb)
- Coat: Double Coat
- Colour: Any shade of grey, grizzle, black, blue, or blue merle, with optional white markings
Kennel club standards
- The Kennel Club: standard
- Fédération Cynologique Internationale: standard

The Old English Sheepdog is a large breed of dog that emerged in England from early types of herding dog. Other names for the breed include Shepherd's Dog and bob-tailed sheep-dog. The nickname Bob-tail (or Bobtail) originates from how dogs of the breed traditionally had their tails docked. Old English Sheepdogs can grow very long coats with fur covering the face and eyes and do not shed unless brushed.

== Appearance ==
The Old English Sheepdog is a large dog, immediately recognizable by its long, thick, shaggy grey and white coat, with fur covering their face and eyes. The ears lie flat to the head. Historically, the breed's tail was commonly docked (resulting in a panda bear–like rear end), but tailed Old English sheepdogs are now common, as many countries have outlawed cosmetic docking. When the dog has a tail, it has long fur (feathering), is low set, and normally hangs down. The Old English Sheepdog stands lower at the shoulder than at the loin, and walks with a "bear-like roll from the rear".

Height at the withers is at least 61 cm (24 in), with females slightly smaller than males. The body is short and compact with a deep chest and 'well-sprung' ribs.

Colour of the double coat may be any shade of grey, grizzle, black, blue, or blue merle, with optional white markings. The undercoat is water resistant. Puppies are born with a black and white coat, and it is only after the puppy coat has been shed that the more common grey or silver shaggy hair appears. Old English Sheepdogs only shed when they are brushed.

== Docking ==
Undocked Old English Sheepdogs are becoming a more common sight as many countries have now banned docking. The Kennel Club (UK) and The Australian National Kennel Council breed standards do not express a preference for (legally) docked or un-docked animals, and either can be shown. The American Kennel Club breed standard states that the tail should be "docked close to the body, when not naturally bob tailed", even though the practice of cosmetic docking is now opposed by the American Veterinary Medical Association.

== History ==
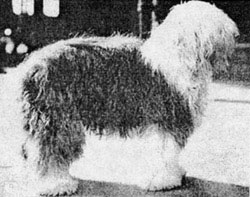
Ch. Slumber, best in show at the Westminster Kennel Club Dog Show in 1914, one of the two times an Old English Sheepdog has won there.

The Old English Sheepdog comes from the pastoral type dogs of England. A small drop-eared dog seen in a 1771 painting by Gainsborough is believed by some to represent the early type of the Old English Sheepdog. In the early 19th century a bobtailed drovers dog, called the Smithfield or Cotswold Cor, was noticed in the southwestern counties of England and may have been an ancestor. Most fanciers agree that the Bearded Collie was among the original stock used in developing today's breed. Some speculate that the Russian Owtchar was among the breed's ancestors.

The Old English Sheepdog was at first called the "Shepherd's Dog" and was exhibited for the first time at a show in Birmingham, England, in 1873. There were only three entries, and the judge felt the quality of the dogs was so poor that he offered only a second placing. From that beginning, the breed became a popular show dog, and, although the shape of the dog itself has changed very little over the years, elaborate grooming including backcombing and powdering the fur was recorded as early as 1907. The breed was exported to the United States in the 1880s, and by the turn of the 20th century, five of the ten wealthiest American families bred and showed the Old English Sheepdog. The breed continues to be a popular show dog today.

The best recent finish of an Old English Sheepdog at the Westminster Kennel Club dog show was in 2013 when Bugaboo's Picture Perfect was awarded Reserve Best in Show.

== Health ==
A 2024 UK study found a life expectancy of 12.1 years for the breed compared to an average of 12.7 for purebreeds and 12 for crossbreeds. The Old English Sheepdog is predisposed to allergic skin disease and demodicosis.

An American study reviewing over a million patients presented to 27 veterinary teaching hospitals in North America found the Old English Sheepdog to be predisposed to hip dysplasia, with 11.1% of dogs examined having the condition compared to 3.52% overall. Another American study of over a million hip evaluations in dogs over the age of 2 years found a prevalence of 17.8%.

A review of 1,934 cases of dogs presenting for gastric dilatation volvulus (GDV) found the Old English Sheepdog to be predisposed, with an odds ratio of 4.8. A UK survey attributed 7% of Old English Sheepdog deaths to GDV.

A review of 369 cases of dilated cardiomyopathy in England found the Old English Sheepdog to make up 9 of those cases.

The Old English Sheepdog is one of the more commonly affected breeds by an autosomal recessive mutation in the MDR1 gene. This mutation results in the affected animal being more susceptible to negative effects of drugs at volumes that are otherwise safe. Common drugs such as doramectin and ivermectin will cause neurotoxicosis.

== Activities ==
The Old English Sheepdog can compete in dog agility trials, obedience, Rally obedience, Schutzhund, showmanship, flyball, tracking, and herding events. Herding instincts and trainability can be measured at noncompetitive herding tests. Old English Sheepdogs that exhibit basic herding instincts can be trained to compete in herding trials.

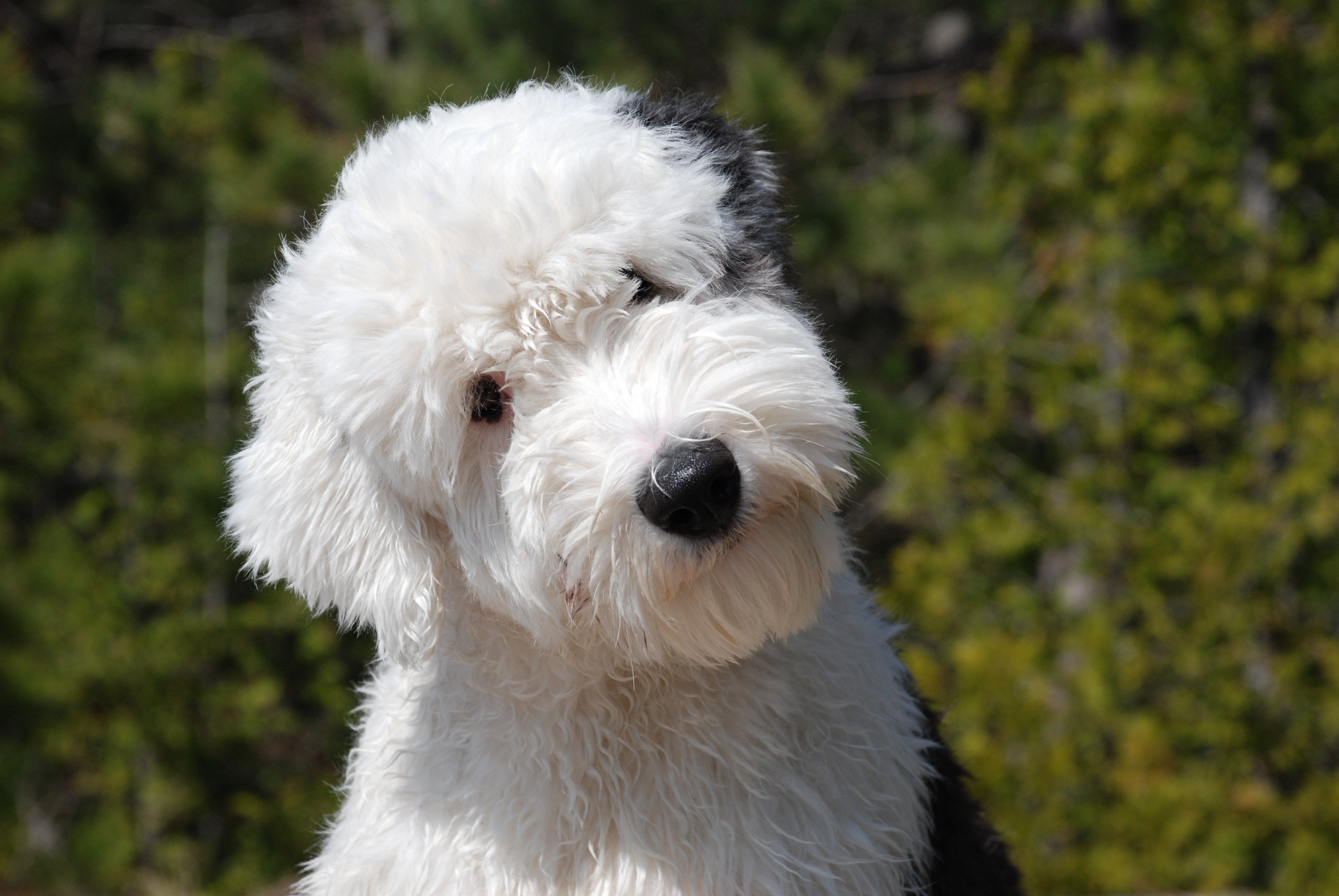
An Old English Sheepdog in a shorter coat clip.

== Dulux dog ==
The Old English Sheepdog has been the brand mascot for Dulux paint since it was first used in a 1961 advertising campaign. It remains a highly popular feature of Dulux television and print adverts, to the extent that the breed is often referred to in those markets as a 'Dulux dog' rather than a Sheepdog.

== See also ==
- List of dog breeds
