= Title (animal) =

In animal husbandry and animal fancy, animals can compete in various shows and sports for titles signifying excellence. These titles vary depending on the species of the animal, the kind of show, and the country the event is held in.

== Dogs ==
=== Conformation Shows ===
Dogs competing in conformation shows are eligible to win two titles. The first is best of breed, which signifies that a given animal is the best of its breed at the show. These best of breed winners then compete to win best in show. Animals that win enough best of breeds and best of shows are called Champions, and their show names are prefixed with Ch., such as Ch. Warren Remedy.

=== Dog Sports ===
Dogs competing in a variety of dog sports are eligible to earn a number of titles. Often the first, or basic tile, signifies that a given animal has displayed a competent level and capable of proceeding in a given discipline. The next title is often incremented by class, level or a Champion, proceeded by a Grand Champion title, in that particular activity. The dog's registered names is then appended or prefixed with the title earned. This varies with the registry or sanctioning body that the title was awarded under. Both prefixed and appended titles are represented in Morghem's .500 Nitro Express's fully titled name CA UWP URO1 CH USJ 'PR' Morghem's .500 Nitro Express CGC TT.

== See also ==
- Agricultural show
- American Kennel Club
- Animals in sport
- Best in Show (disambiguation)
- Best of Breed
- Breed registry
- Canine Good Citizen
- Cat show
- Championship (dog)
- Conformation show
- Dock jumping
- Dog sports
- Horse show
- Lure coursing
- Purebred dog
- Rally obedience
- United Kennel Club
- Weight pulling
