= Championship (dog) =

Dog award

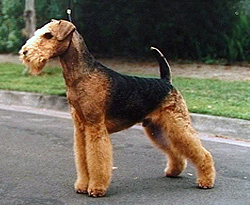
Australian & New Zealand Champion Airedale Terrier

Championships are awarded to dogs who have passed through a process of selection at dog shows. Traditionally, a championship was received at a conformation show, but championships are now offered for dogs who have attained a high degree of perfection in other dog sports as well.

== The conformation championship title ==
A dog qualifying for a championship at a conformation show has the designation Champion or "Ch." (or "GCH" for Grand Champion) added as a prefix to its registered name (but not to its call name, the name by which the dog is actually called). The Best in Show winner of the 2008 Crufts show (UK), for example, was a Giant Schnauzer, Ch. Jafrak Philippe Olivier, call name Philip. Winner of the 2008 Westminster show (US) was a Beagle, Ch. K-Run's Park Me In First, call name Uno.

See registered name for a discussion of dogs' registered names; there is no championship requirement for any particular sort of registered name. Registered names typically only reflect an individual kennel's recordkeeping system.

Abbreviations of the name of the country or countries where the championship was earned are often added before the Ch. An international Fédération Cynologique Internationale championship is written as Int. Ch. (or ICh.). Other combinations are possible, such as the Miniature Schnauzer, ICh. Mex.Ch Rice's Its Snow Tea Party (International and Mexican Championships). Winners of the Fédération Cynologique Internationale World Show have World Ch. or World-V## (World Championship and the year won) also placed before their registered name.

Traditionally, only one major kennel club in a country offered championships (two in the US), so no confusion arose from this system. Today there are many small internet based registries and companies that offer titles; to prevent deception, the name of the minor registry should be appended to the title.

A dog that completes a championship (called a finished champion) may continue to be entered in shows to compete for Group (winner of its group) or Best In Show (BIS) honors. A finished dog that continues to compete is called a special. Owners of Best in Show winners may add BIS or Multi BIS (multiple best in show winners) to their dog's name, as in the Siberian Husky Multi BIS/Ch Phoebe Run To Phoebus. Many prestigious shows only accept entries from dogs that have finished their championships.

== Conformation championship requirements ==
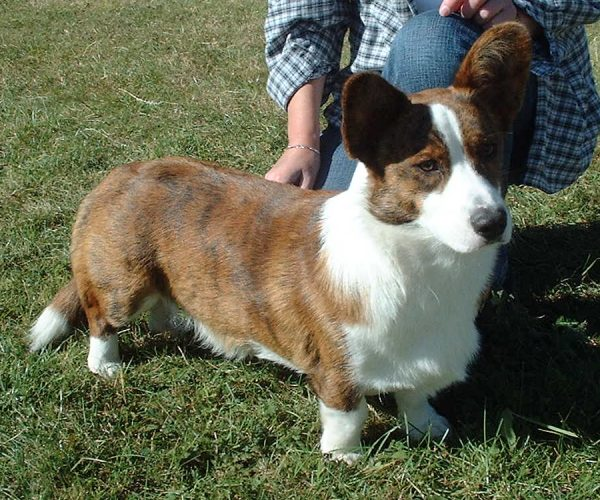
Am. Ch. Salvenik Secret Agent of Elmsmere

A dog earns a championship with wins at a specified number of conformation shows, where a judge evaluates a dog's breed type and how closely the dog approaches the ideal represented in its breed's standard. Often there are requirements as to the number of dogs of the same breed that must be in competition at a show for championship requirements to be met. Each kennel club has its own criteria to follow in qualifying for a championship.

Examples:

- For the Royal Kennel Club (UK) championship, a dog must gain 3 Challenge Certificates (CCs) from three different judges, one of which must be awarded when the dog is over 12 months old, or as of 1st July 2023, two CCs and five RCCs (Reserve CCs). There must be a sufficient entry of the breed at a Championship Show for the CC to be awarded.
- In Australia, dogs must accumulate 100 points, the maximum earned at any one time is 25 and the minimum is 6, according to the Australian National Kennel Council
- For the Canadian Kennel Club championship (Can. Ch), 10 points are needed for a championship, with wins under at least three different judges, and at least one "competition win" (a win over a specified number of dogs of that breed), totaling at least 2 points. The point schedule is the same across the country.
- For the American Kennel Club championship (Am. Ch), a dog attains its championship (Champion of Record) after earning fifteen points. Included in the fifteen points must be two "majors."

In New Zealand, a Challenge Certificate is given to the Best Dog and the Best Bitch. Dogs older than 6 months are eligible. You must attain 8, 5 of which must be under different judges, and 1 must have been attained when the dog reaches 1 year of age.

- For the United Kennel Club (US) (UKC Ch), a combination of points (for example, winning the class earns 10 points in non-variety breeds, 5 in variety breeds) and competition wins (including group placements and Best In Show/Reserve Best in Multi-Breed Show) are required. In UKC a dog must receive 100 points with at least three competition wins under three different judges. A competition win is when a dog defeats at least one other dog and receives points. A UKC Grand Champion (GRCh) title is earned by winning in competition with other champions of the breed in at least five shows under at least three different judges.
- The Fédération Cynologique Internationale sponsors international shows that differ from other shows in that dogs first receive individual written descriptions of positive and negative qualities from the judge, and only dogs with high ratings go on to compete against other dogs in the class. A dog must receive four international Certificat d'Aptitude au Championnat International de Beauté to qualify for a championship; one must be won in the dog's own country, and at least two in two other countries under at least three different judges.

The above are representative of the policies of the major show-giving bodies, but any individual or group may offer championships and devise their own requirements.

== Performance championships ==
Championships are also offered in performance events; these differ from breed ring (conformation show) championships and are usually written with additional abbreviations indicating the nature of the championship.

=== Obedience Trial championships ===
In the American Kennel Club, an Obedience Trial Championship (OTCH) is awarded to a dog and handler team receiving 100 points by placing first, second, third or fourth in the Open B or Utility B class and a first place in Utility B and/or Open B three times. In addition, a National Obedience Championship title (NOC) is awarded to one dog each year. Obedience Trial championships offered by the United Kennel Club (US) are prefixed with U: U-OTCH. United Kennel Club requirements are similar to those of the American Kennel Club. The Canadian Kennel Club OTCH title has less stringent requirements than the American Kennel Club OTCH. However, the CKC also offers several titles beyond the OTCH. These include Obedience Trial Champion Excellent (O.T.Ch.X), Master Obedience Trial Champion (M.O.T.Ch.) and Grand Master Obedience Trial Champion (G.M.O.T.Ch.).

=== Agility championships ===
Agility national or world-wide championships are offered by various organizations; for example, teams sponsored by a country's national kennel club compete for the Fédération Cynologique Internationale's World Agility Championships.

A large number of organizations worldwide offer individual championships, reflecting an ever-higher perfection in precision and running time. For an individual championship, a dog collects qualifying scores throughout his life; a sufficient number of qualifying scores at the top level earns a championship title, which entitles them to a prefix for their name. ADCH is the prefix used for a championship earned in USDAA; NATCH is the prefix used for a championship earned in NADAC. The United Kennel Club (US) agility championship title is recognized by the prefix U-ACH. The highest level championship awarded by CPE is the C-ATE.

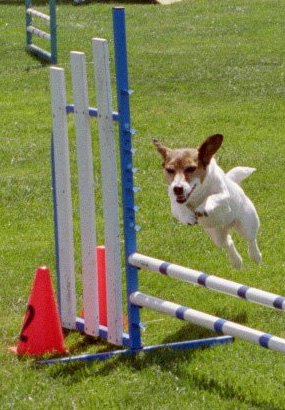
Agility champion

=== Weight Pull championships ===
The United Kennel Club (US) offers championships in weight pulling; the title WPCh or WPCH is added as a prefix to the dog's registered name.

=== Hunting trial championships ===
The United Kennel Club (US) offers hunting retriever championships (HRCH) for dogs who have earned one hundred Championship Points; points are earned at hunt tests, with an increasing number of points awarded based on the dog's level and the tests passed. The National Grouse Dog Championship was first offered in 1913 in Pennsylvania, US. Numerous other championships are offered by the American Kennel Club for hunting dogs in particular types of hunting, such as Water Race Champion and Nite Champion.

=== Flyball championships ===
FDCh is the prefix used for a flyball championship.

=== Tracking championships ===
A tracking championship is offered by the American Kennel Club. The prefix used is TD or TDX Tracking Dog or Tracking Dog champion

The Australian National Kennel Council offers both Tracking and Track & Search championships.

=== Coursing championships ===
Various coursing clubs offer championships. In the US, these include the North American Open Field Association, which offers the Coursing Champion (CC) title; the North American Coursing Association, offering the NACA Coursing Champion (NACC) title; and the American Sighthound Field Association, which offers the Field Champion (F.Ch.) title. The American Kennel Club also offers a F.Ch. title in coursing.

=== Herding championships ===
The prefix WTCH (Working Trial Champion) is used for the championship offered by the Australian Shepherd Club of America.

=== Disc Dog championships ===
The Frisbee Dog World Championship offered the first championships for the sport of Disc Dog.

=== Multiple event championships ===
For the VCC, Versatile Companion Champion (AKC prefix), the dog completes OTCH, MACH and CT championships.

== Other titles ==
Dogs also earn other titles that are usually added as suffixes to the dog's registered name, leading to the saying the "A well balanced dog has titles at both ends" (of its name). Examples would be the Kennel Club Agility Warrant, or the American Kennel Club's TD (Tracking Dog) title. The United Kennel Club (US) are differentiated from the American Kennel Club (US) titles with the added U, as in U-CD (Companion Dog), and that all titles are used as prefixes. Schutzhund titles are given in three phases as requirements are completed. Other dog sport clubs offer certification or titles in their sport such as carting or water rescue dog, and are usually added as suffixes to the dog's registered name.

== Health problems ==
Health issues with purebred dogs and objections to dog sports and dog showing have been extensively covered in these articles - Criticism of dog showing | Genetic disease | List of dog diseases | Canine reproduction | Inbreeding and others. Also see articles about individual dog breeds for more on the health, breeding, and use issues of individual breeds.

== See also ==
- Champion
- Conformation show
- Dog sports
