= Westminster Kennel Club Dog Show =

Annual conformation show in New York City

- Status: Active
- Genre: Dog show
- Frequency: Annual
- Venue: Madison Square Garden
- Locations: New York City, New York, U.S.
- Country: United States
- Years active: 1877–present
- Inaugurated: 1877
- Participants: Purebred dogs
- Organizer: Westminster Kennel Club
- Sponsor: Purina Pro Plan
- Website: westminsterkennelclub.org

The Westminster Kennel Club Dog Show is an all-breed conformation show, held annually in the New York metropolitan area.

The Westminster Kennel Club Dog Show is one of a handful of benched shows in the United States. Dogs are required to be on display in their assigned locations (show benches) during the entire show except when shown in the ring, groomed for showtime, or taken outside to urinate or defecate. This type of presentation allows spectators and breeders alike to have an opportunity of seeing all the entered dogs. (In the more common unbenched shows, dogs are required to be present only at assigned ring times.)

The event has long been associated with the various incarnations of New York City's Madison Square Garden, which hosted the event nearly uninterrupted from 1877 to 2020. Its hosting streak was disrupted in 2021 due to the COVID-19 pandemic; from 2021 to 2024, the event was delayed to a late-spring/early-summer scheduling and held at outdoor venues instead, with the 2021 and 2022 editions held on the grounds of the Lyndhurst mansion in Tarrytown, New York, and the 2023 and 2024 editions held at Billie Jean King National Tennis Center and Arthur Ashe Stadium in Queens. In 2025, the event returned to Madison Square Garden and its traditional scheduling for the first time since 2020.

The logo of both the Westminster Kennel Club and its Dog Show is based on a steel engraving by artist J. Wellstood of Sensation, a Pointer brought over from England by the organization in 1876 primarily for breeding purposes.

== History ==
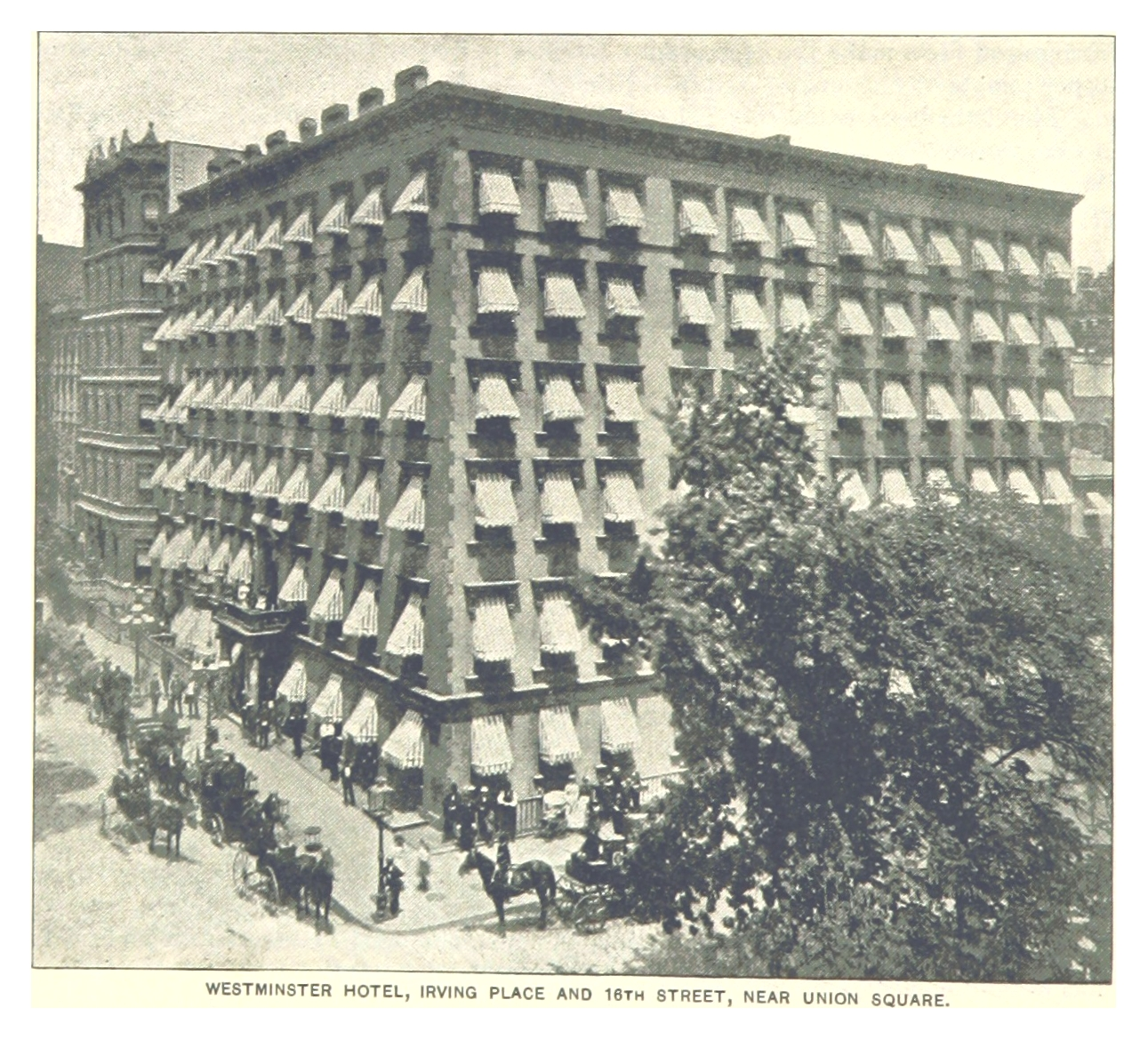
Westminster Hotel, Irving Place and 16th Street

The first Westminster show took place on May 8, 1877, making it third only to the Kentucky Derby and Kentucky Oaks in terms of continuously held sporting events in the United States. (All three events were held despite the Great Depression, World War, and pandemic years.) The show originated as a show for gun dogs, primarily Setters and Pointers, initiated by a group of hunters who met regularly at the Westminster Hotel at Irving Place and Sixteenth Street in Manhattan. They decided to create a kennel club called the Westminster Kennel Club specifically to hold a dog show. The prizes for these first shows included such items as pearl-handled pistols, which were of use to the hunters and terriermen who worked these dogs in the field.

Held at Gilmore's Garden (Madison Square Garden) the Westminster show drew over 1,200 dogs. It proved so popular that it took four days instead of the three days originally scheduled. The club donated proceeds from the fourth day to the ASPCA for creation of a home for stray and disabled dogs.

The Westminster Kennel Club predates the formation of the American Kennel Club by seven years and became the first club admitted to the AKC after AKC's founding in 1884. Breed parent clubs (e.g., the Collie Club of America) create the standards for judging their breeds, with the AKC administering the rules about shows and judging.

Dogs are judged by how closely they conform to a written description of the ideal specimen of that breed (the breed standard). While many breeds no longer need to perform their original jobs and are bred mostly for companionship, they are still judged on their innate ability and physical makeup to perform their original jobs. Standards also include items that seem somewhat arbitrary such as color, eye shape, tail carriage, and more.

Today, Westminster takes place over two days and nights. During the day, the dogs compete against other dogs of the same breed at the Jacob K. Javits Convention Center. Each Best of Breed winner (BOB) advances to the Group level. There are seven groups: Sporting, Hound, Working, Terrier, Toy, Non-Sporting, and Herding. Group competition occurs during the evenings. The seven Group winners advance to Best in Show, the final round of the show. During Best in Show, also held at Madison Square Garden, a judge will select one of judging them as the Best In Show winner. Since 2014, the show allowed mixed-breed dogs to compete in an agility event.

Westminster has held competitions in Junior Showmanship for handlers ages 9–18 since 1934. The eight finalists all receive scholarships for post-secondary schooling. The Club, through the Westminster Kennel Foundation also awards veterinary school scholarships for students from six schools yearly.

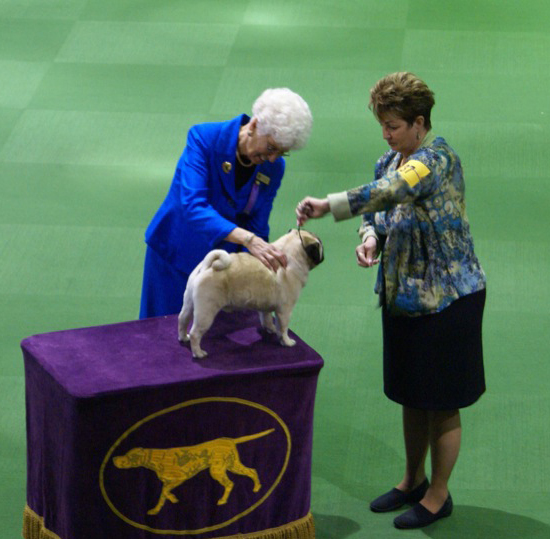
A Pug at the Westminster Kennel Club Dog Show in 2013.

The winning dog becomes "America's Dog" for the coming year. The reign begins with a media tour on the day following the show. Following the tour, the winner makes appearances on nearly all television network morning shows and visits the Observation Deck at the Empire State Building. The New York Stock Exchange also invites the winner and related handlers to ring the opening bell.

In October 2020, due to the COVID-19 pandemic in New York City, the 2021 show was postponed from its usual scheduling to June, and re-located from Madison Square Garden, and held behind closed doors on the grounds of the historic Lyndhurst mansion in Tarrytown, New York, north of Midtown Manhattan. Organizers stated that the changes were intended to allow for the event to be held in compliance with public health guidance. On December 30, 2021, citing the current surge of Omicron variant in New York City, it was announced that the 2022 show—initially scheduled for January 24–26—had been postponed indefinitely. On February 8, 2022, it was announced that the 2022 show would once again be postponed to June and held at Lyndhurst. The event would be reopened to the public.

The 2023 edition moved to a May scheduling, and was relocated to the USTA Billie Jean King National Tennis Center in Queens, with Arthur Ashe Stadium serving as the main venue. For the first time, a dock jumping competition was also added to the event. After two years in Queens, it was announced in June 2024 that the show would return to Madison Square Garden and its traditional February scheduling in 2025, ahead of its 150th edition in 2026.

== Requirements for entry ==
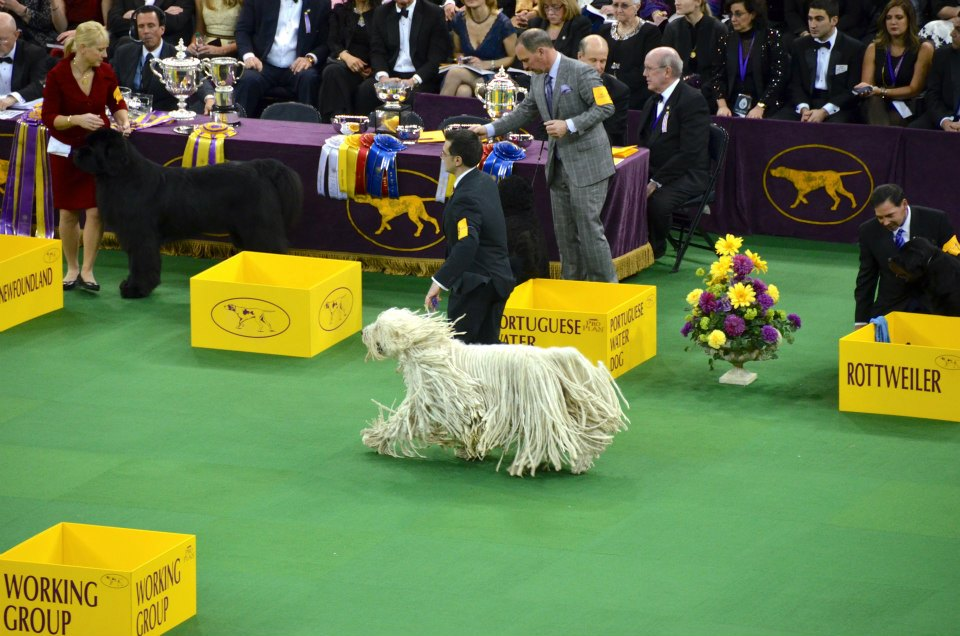
A Komondor in 2013.

In 1884, the AKC began requiring that all dog participants be registered with the AKC and recognized for conformation show competition. In 2016, there are 199 breeds and varieties eligible for Westminster. Because of the show's popularity and prestige, starting in 1992 the AKC limited entries by requiring that dogs must have already earned their breed championship before appearing at Westminster. Later, the Westminster Kennel Club amended that rule; dogs only need one of the two required "major wins" towards their championship titles. However, they do not need to be finished champions to enter.

Since 2020, the requirement that a dog be a Champion was reinstated by the Westminster Kennel Club and the entry limit decreased to 2,500. The conformation show was also spread over three days instead of the traditional two days, due to the unavailability of one of the usual venues for the event.

The top five dogs in each breed (based on breed points earned in AKC conformation showing through October 31 of the preceding year), as well as the Best of Breed winner from each breed's national specialty show, receive printed invitations by mail and are eligible for early entry. After that entry deadline passes, other dogs with at least one "major win" may enter, up to a cut-off entry total of 2800 dogs.

There is no prohibition against a winner competing again in future Westminster shows. Seven dogs have won multiple Westminster championships: six dogs in consecutive years (including Warren Remedy, the only three-time champion of the event), and one dog in non-consecutive years. Since 1972, however, there have been no repeat winners.

Dogs of all breeds, including mutts, may participate in the show's agility competition. There is a title for the highest-ranking mutt in the agility round—the "All American Dog."

== Winning breeds ==
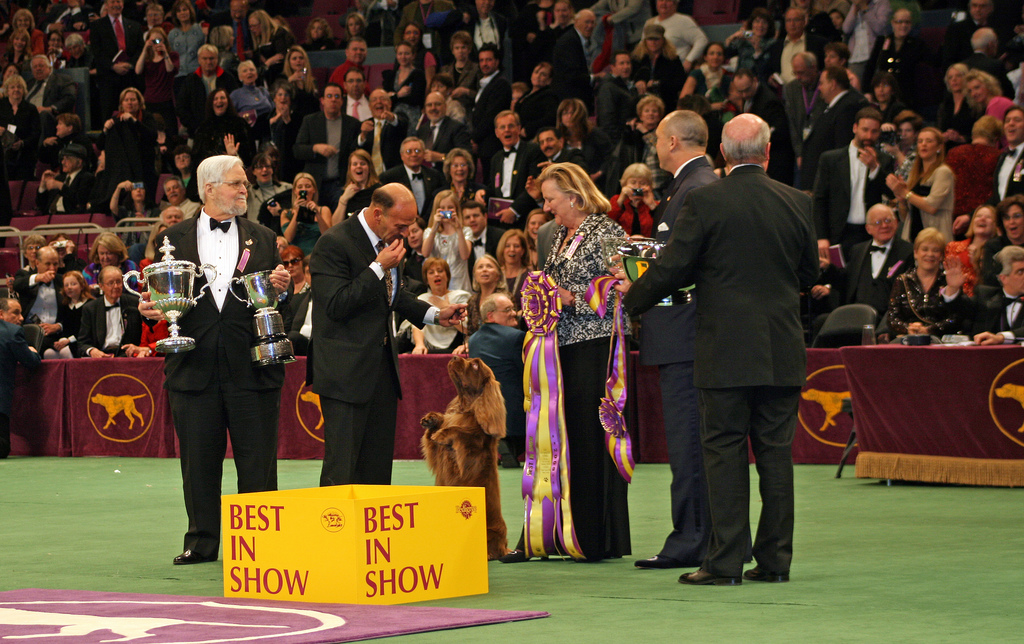
Stump being awarded Best in Show at the 2009 Westminster Kennel Club Dog Show.

Through the 134th Westminster Show (February 2010), Best in Show has been won by the Terrier group 45 out of the 103 times that the prize has been awarded since 1907, more than twice as many wins as any other group. The single breed that has won the most is the Wire Fox Terrier, which has won 15 times. Two of the most popular dog breeds in the United States—the Labrador Retriever and Golden Retriever—have never won Best in Show. The dogs are marked for Best in Breed and then proceed to compete in Best in Group, and finally in the grand prize competition of Best in Show.

- Terrier group: 46
- Sporting group: 18
- Working group: 15
- Toy group: 11
- Non-Sporting group: 10
- Hound group: 6
- Herding group: 3

The oldest dog to win Best in Show was a Sussex Spaniel named Ch. Clussexx Three D Grinchy Glee (a.k.a. Stump), at ten years of age in 2009. The youngest dog to win was a Rough Collie named Laund Loyalty of Bellhaven, at nine months old in 1929. One dog, a Smooth Fox Terrier named Ch. Warren Remedy won Best in Show three times (1907–1909), and six other dogs have won twice. Males have won Best in Show 68 times as opposed to females who have won 35 times.

== Announcers ==
For many years, Roger A. Caras was known as "the Voice of Westminster" for providing the narration for the breed descriptions during the show.

In 2001, Michael J. LaFave was named show announcer at the Westminster Kennel Club Dog Show. He was replaced by Jim Fagan in 2010 but returned in 2011.

== Television ==
Group judging for the Toy Group at the 2019 Westminster Kennel Club Dog Show

CBS Sports covered the event from the late 1960s to the 1980s as part of its CBS Sports Spectacular anthology series.

From 1984 until 2003, Universal's USA Network broadcast the Westminster Kennel Club Dog Show. Following Universal's acquisition by General Electric in 2003 to form NBC Universal, the coverage (as with all other sporting events carried by the channel) became a presentation of NBC Sports, but the broadcast continued to air on USA Network. From 2006 through 2016, the Monday coverage was aired on sister channel CNBC due to conflicts with WWE Raw on USA. During USA's coverage from 1990 to 2016, David Frei co-hosted the event with partners, Al Trautwig (1990–1991, 1993), Bud Collins (1992), Joe Garagiola (1994–2002), Mark McEwen (2003–2004), Lester Holt (2005, 2007–2008), Debbye Turner (2006), Mary Carillo (2009, 2011–2016), and Tamron Hall (2010). Frei provided the commentary of the 140th event for his final time.

On July 28, 2015, Fox Sports announced that it had acquired rights to the event under a 10-year deal beginning in 2017. For the first three years, the coverage was split between FS1 and then-sister channel Nat Geo Wild. For 2017, daytime breed judging was hosted by Justin Kutcher, Paula Nykiel and Jason Hoke and primetime coverage was hosted by Chris Myers and Gail Miller Bisher. In 2018, daytime breed judging was hosted by Kutcher, Kimberly Meredith, and Don Sturz, while Hoke joined the evening booth of Myers and Bisher. In 2019, Sturz and Hoke swapped places, with Sturz moving to the evening booth while Hoke joined the daytime booth.

After the sale of the National Geographic channels to Disney as part of its acquisition of 21st Century Fox (which excluded the Fox broadcast network, news, and national sports properties, which were retained by a new entity known as Fox Corporation), FS2 replaced Nat Geo Wild as the secondary broadcaster of the event in 2020. John Strong replaced Kutcher as host for daytime breed judging and Fox hosts were Myers, Bisher, and Sturz. For 2021, the agility competition and the final night of judging aired on Fox for the first time. For 2022, Sturz was named Judge for Best in Show, and Hoke will return to the main booth.

The 2024 broadcast team consisted of 2016 champion handler Valerie Nunes Atkinson alongside Hoke and Myers, with Jenny Taft and Jamie Little as reporters. Daytime judging coverage is by Strong, Meredith, Johan Becerra-Hernandez, and Alison Williams.

On May 13, 2026, it was announced that the event starting in 2027 will be streamed on Netflix, marking the first time it will not be on broadcast or cable television.

== See also ==
- AKC National Championship
- Crufts
- List of Best in Show winners of the Westminster Kennel Club Dog Show
- World Dog Show
