= Clussexx Three D Grinchy Glee =

Dog; Westminster Best in Show winner 2009

Ch. Clussexx Three D Grinchy Glee
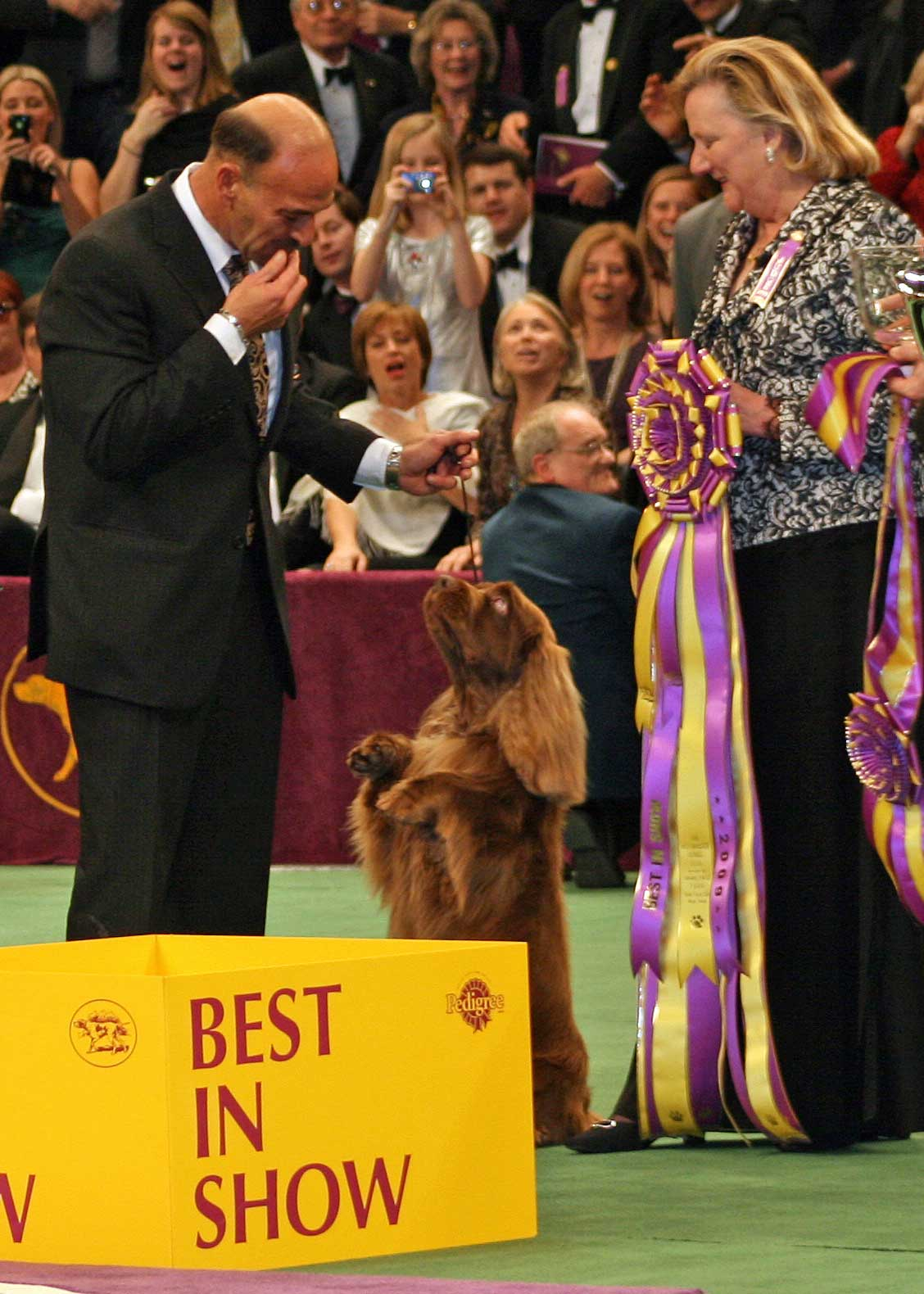
- Stump is named Best in Show at the 2009 Westminster Dog Show.
- Other name: Stump
- Species: Canis lupus familiaris
- Breed: Sussex Spaniel
- Sex: Male
- Born: December 1, 1998
- Died: September 25, 2012 (aged 13); Houston, Texas
- Occupation: Show dog
- Title: Best In Show at the Westminster Dog Show
- Term: 2009
- Predecessor: Ch. K-Run's Park Me In First
- Successor: Ch. Roundtown Mercedes of Maryscot
- Owners: Cecilia Ruggles and Beth Dowd
- Parents: Ch. Three D Genghis Khan (sire); Ch. Clussexx Sprinkled With Dew (dam)
- Weight: 50 lb (23 kg)
- Awards: 51 "Best in Show" wins

Ch. Clussexx Three D Grinchy Glee (December 1, 1998 – September 25, 2012), better known as Stump, was a male Sussex Spaniel who won Best In Show at the 2009 Westminster Kennel Club Dog Show. Stump was the first of his breed to win that honor and, at 10 years old, the oldest dog ever to win the prize. He also won the Sporting Group at Westminster in 2004, the first such victory for his breed, and amassed 51 Best in Show awards throughout his career. One of his owners described him as "the most famous Sussex (Spaniel) that has ever lived".

Stump's breeders were Douglas Horn, Douglas Johnson, and Dee Duffy, and he was owned by Cecilia Ruggles and Beth Dowd. He was handled by Scott Sommer, who also trained 2001 Westminster Best in Show winner J.R., a Bichon Frise with whom Stump lived for most of his life. Stump became seriously ill in 2005 with a body-wide bacterial infection, infection on his heart valves, and other ailments often fatal for dogs. He was so sick that euthanasia was considered. Stump spent 19 days in hospitalization, including 12 in intensive care at Texas A&M University's Small Animal Hospital, and he ultimately survived.

It took Stump two years to fully recover from the effects of the illness, and he was retired from competition for four years with no expectation to return. In 2009, Sommer entered Stump in the 133rd Westminster Kennel Dog Show, a last-minute decision made less than a week before the show began. Little was done to prepare Stump for the show, and his owners and trainer had little expectation that he would perform well; Las Vegas odds indicated he had only a 275-to-1 chance to win. Nevertheless, he became a crowd favorite and ultimately won the top prize.

Stump retired to Sommer's home in Houston, Texas, after the 2009 Westminster show. He died on September 25, 2012, at age 13, as the result of an illness. Several of Stump's descendants have competed in dog shows, including Bean, a crowd favorite who won the Sporting Group in both the 2018 and 2019 Westminster shows.

== Early life and show career ==
Clussexx Three D Grinchy Glee was born December 1, 1998. His sire was Ch. Three D Genghis Khan, also known as "Gus", and his dam was Ch. Clussexx Sprinkled With Dew, also known as "Sprinkle". Stump is a descendant of Ch. The Vicar of Lexxfield CD, who won the first Best in Show in the breed and placed fourth in the Sporting Group at the 114th Westminster Kennel Club Dog Show in 1990. He was nicknamed "Stump" because he was brown with stubby legs and a wide, sturdy body that resembled a tree stump. His breeders were Douglas Horn, Douglas Johnson, and Dee Duffy; the "Three D" portion of his name represents Duffy's kennel, named for the three breeders, and indicates his blood line. Johnson also bred Brady, the Clumber Spaniel who won the Westminster Kennel Club Dog Show's Best In Show award in 1996.

Stump was owned by Redding, Connecticut resident Cecilia Ruggles and Southern Pines, North Carolina resident Beth Dowd and handled by Scott Sommer of Houston, Texas. Dowd had been showing various breeds of dogs at Westminster since 1999 and was a member of the Moore County Kennel Club in Moore County, North Carolina.

In 2003, Stump began living with Sommer in Houston, along with J.R., a Bichon Frise who won the Westminster Dog Show in 2001 and was also trained by Sommer and co-owned by Ruggles. Stump regularly displayed a positive personality; Sommer said "I love his temperament and attitude toward life." Dowd described him as "the epitome of the standard for his breed". On April 5, 2003, Stump won Best in Show at a show sponsored by the Kennel Club of Yorkville, held at Arlington Park in Arlington Heights, Illinois. On July 20, 2003, Stump won Best in Show at the Galveston Kennel Club show in Galveston, Texas, defeating 3,986 other dogs over the course of the three-day event. In August 2003, Stump won Best in Show Reliant Park World Series of Dog Shows in Houston.

By 2004, when Stump was five years old, he had amassed 50 Best in Show awards as well as the Sporting Group at the 128th Westminster Kennel Club Dog Show, which was decided by noted dog show judge Judith Goodin. This marked the first time a Sussex Spaniel won that group. Richard Sandomir of The New York Times wrote that Stump's "tail wagged constantly (as he) defeated a variety of elegant pointers, field dogs, gun dogs, hunters and retrievers, some with water-repellent coats, others with wire-haired coats". According to Brian J. Lowney of The Herald News, audiences and members of the media were "dumbfounded" by the fact that Stump defeated other better-known and more attractive sporting dogs. Dowd felt Stump deserved to win overall Best in Show at Westminster that year as well, but the prize ultimately went to the Newfoundland Josh. Despite not winning the top prize, Stump attracted national media attention and appeared on the morning television show Good Morning America.

On January 15, 2005, Stump won the Sporting Group at the AKC National Championship, organized by the American Kennel Club at the Tampa Convention Center in Tampa, Florida. Sommer entered Stump in several other Texas dog shows throughout 2005, including the Reliant Park World Series of Dog Shows in Houston in July 2005. Sommer's 16-year-old nephew, Brian, showed Stump in that show, and they won in the junior showmanship category.

== Serious illness and recovery ==
Stump became seriously ill in 2005, so much so that euthanasia was considered. Stump was initially taken to the Brittmoore Animal Hospital in Houston, but he did not respond to treatment there. In January 2006, he was transferred to Texas A&M University's Small Animal Hospital for treatment by veterinary specialists. Stump was hospitalized for a total of 19 days, including 12 in the intensive care unit of A&M's Small Animal Hospital. He had a body-wide bacterial infection as well as infection on his heart valves, fluid in his lungs, and disseminated intravascular coagulation, a blood coagulation disorder. The conditions were uncommon, difficult to diagnose, and often fatal for dogs. As Sommer explained to the media: "His insides stopped working." Stump was treated with antibiotic therapy, heart medications, oxygen, and anticoagulant medications, and ultimately had a full recovery. Katherine Snyder, the medical resident in charge of his case, said: "He really pulled through like a champion." The exact cause the illness was never determined.

It took Stump about two years to fully recover from the effects of the illness. According to Sommer, Stump spent most of this time sleeping in his handler's bed. Due to the seriousness of Stump's illness, his owners were reluctant to ever show him again, and Sommer vowed to never do so.

== Westminster's Best in Show ==
After four years of retirement, Sommer entered Stump in the 133rd Westminster Kennel Club Dog Show, which was held in New York City's Madison Square Garden on February 10, 2009, and included approximately 2,500 dogs and 170 breeds, from as far away as Russia, Brazil, and at least five other countries. Entering Stump in the competition was a last-minute decision, and Sommer did not enter him in the competition until February 4, 2009, less than one week before the show began. Even after registering Stump, Sommer thought he might not take him, and would decide based on how good he looked in the day or two before the flight to get there. Prior to the 2009 Westminster contest, Stump had not attended another dog show or even worn a leash since his illness. Sommer did little more to prepare him than walking him around his Houston driveway, and said his only goal was for Stump to have a good showing. Beth Dowd said, because Stump's health seemed had improved since his illness, they entered him in Westminster as "a trial run for possible competition in an upcoming special show". Carol Dowd said they had little expectation he could win: "He was just an extra dog entered, and we just planned to have fun." Westminster Judge Sari Brewster Tietjen said of the dog's long absence from the showing scene: "To bring a dog into the Garden who hasn't been showing, (Sommer) was a little insane." Stump's co-breeder Dee Duffy had another Sussex spaniel named Ch. Three D Lock and Load that she planned to enter into the competition, but once it was determined Stump would compete, she withdrew his entry, saying: "For me that was going to be like competing against yourself.

Imagine Michael Jordan coming back to make one more jumper. Or John Elway returning to toss a final TD pass. Or Nolan Ryan reappearing to throw a farewell fastball. That's what happened in the dog show world. Having just turned 10, a Sussex spaniel called Stump became the oldest best in show winner at the Westminster Kennel Club, ending his retirement last week and taking the big prize Tuesday night.

— Ben Walker, Associated Press

Stump was characterized in the media as a crowd favorite at the 2009 Westminster show; Katie Thomas of The New York Times wrote: "Stump was greeted with deafening applause each time he plodded around the ring." Likewise, David Frei, who had been announcing Westminster shows for 20 years, said of him: "Stump was a big crowd-pleaser. It's his look. He looks like a pet dog that would be sitting next to you on the couch." However, Las Vegas odds indicated the dog had only a 275-to-1 chance to win Best in Show. Stump won in his breed category, where his son, Ch. Lexxfield Twilight Hunter, was among the competing dogs he defeated. He also won the Sporting Group, where Judge Robert Ennis chose him over 27 other competing dogs. Even after these victories, Sommer did not believe Stump would win the top prize.

On February 10, 2009, Stump was named Best in Show, in part because judges felt he had a "cheerful and tractable disposition" in keeping with the breed's standard. Among the finalists Stump defeated were Spirit, a Giant Schnauzer who was ranked the No. 1 show dog in the nation at the time, and Lincoln, a Griffon Bruxellois who was also widely considered a favorite. Other group winners Stump defeated for the top prize included Yes, a standard poodle with 94 Best in Show wins; Sadie, a Scottish Terrier; Tiger Woods, a Scottish Deerhound; and Conrad, a Puli.

The victory marked Stump's 51st career Best in Show win. Sommer said because the expectations for Stump were so low, there was very little pressure during the competition: "This was like going for a walk with my pet." Judge Tietjen, who had been judging for more than 40 years, said she did not decide to crown Stump the victor until the last moment: "I didn't know who he was or how old he was. He's just everything that you'd want in the breed, and I couldn't say no to him." Sommer said of Stump's victory: "I was more surprised than most people." Stump became the first Sussex Spaniel to win Best in Show, and the oldest dog to ever win the title, a distinction previously held by 1999 winner Kirby, an eight-year-old Papillon. Two other dogs co-owned by Dowd placed in 2009's Westminster show: a Lakeland Terrier named Ranger won Best of Breed, and Pixie, a Bichon, took fourth in her group.

Stump made appearances on MSNBC and such television programs as Today, The Early Show, The Martha Stewart Show after his victory.

== Later life and death ==
Unlike the previous Best in Show winner, the Beagle Uno, who spent a full year touring the country after his victory, Stump was expected to return home and do little traveling because of his advanced age and past health problems and he retired to Sommer's home in Houston very shortly after the Best in Show win. However, some travel was planned for Stump representing the Moore County Kennel Club and participating in publicity for the New York-based therapy dog program Angel on a Leash. According to The Wall Street Journal, as of May 2009 Stump had accumulated over 440,000 miles from Continental Airlines frequent flyer program. He was also a representative of Take the Lead, an organization that provides services and support for people in the purebred dog business who have suffered life-threatening or terminal illnesses. He appeared on the cover of May/June 2009 issue of AARP The Magazine and attended Houston's Reliant Park World Series of Dog Shows in July 2009. In February 2010, Stump returned to New York City to participate in a benefit show two days before the start of the 134th Annual Westminster Kennel Club Dog Show.

Stump became ill in September 2012; he stopped eating and required veterinarian visits nearly every day. Sommer said on his final week: "He just didn't want to do it anymore, and it wasn't much of a quality of life." Stump was euthanized on September 25, 2012, in Houston with Sommer. He was 13 years old. J.R., the Bichon Frise who won the Westminster Dog Show in 2001, had still been living with Stump and Sommer, and died just six days earlier than Stump. Cecelia Ruggles said of Stump: "He's the most famous Sussex (Spaniel) that has ever lived".

Several descendants of Stump have participated in dog shows as well. Stump sired three pups: two males named Root and Forest, and a female named Myrtle. All three were owned by Carol Dowd, the daughter of Stump's co-owner Beth Dowd. All three of the pups compete in dog shows. Pooh Bear, Stump's great grandson, was owned by Cindy Read of Milwaukee and began participating in shows at age one in 2014, including the Burlington Kennel Club dog show in Burlington, Iowa, in August. Stump's grandson GCh. Kamand's Full Of Beans @ Erinhill, better known as "Bean", won the Westminster Kennel Club Dog Show's Sporting Group category in both 2018 and 2019. Bean was owned by Karen and Amanda Toner, of Hampden, Massachusetts. His sire, GCh. Erinhill Cpnwy Mr Fuzzywrinkles, was Stump's son. Like Stump, Bean was considered a crowd favorite, and some commentators felt he should have won the overall Best in Show award.

== In popular culture ==
Stump was the favorite of Dr. Ruth Westheimer, the celebrity sex therapist and author, who witnessed his Best in Show victory at Westminster. Randy Levine, president of the New York Yankees baseball team and a regular Westminster attendee, was also particularly impressed with Stump.

During the February 11, 2009, episode of The Colbert Report, Stephen Colbert, whose character often complains when passed over for awards, expressed anger Stump won the Westminster dog show instead of him. Colbert said of the Sussex Spaniel, "What does he have that I don't have? Look, my ear is floppy. Look how firm my haunches are! Look how silky my coat is! The secret? I crack a raw egg in my bowl."
