= Welsh Springer Spaniel =

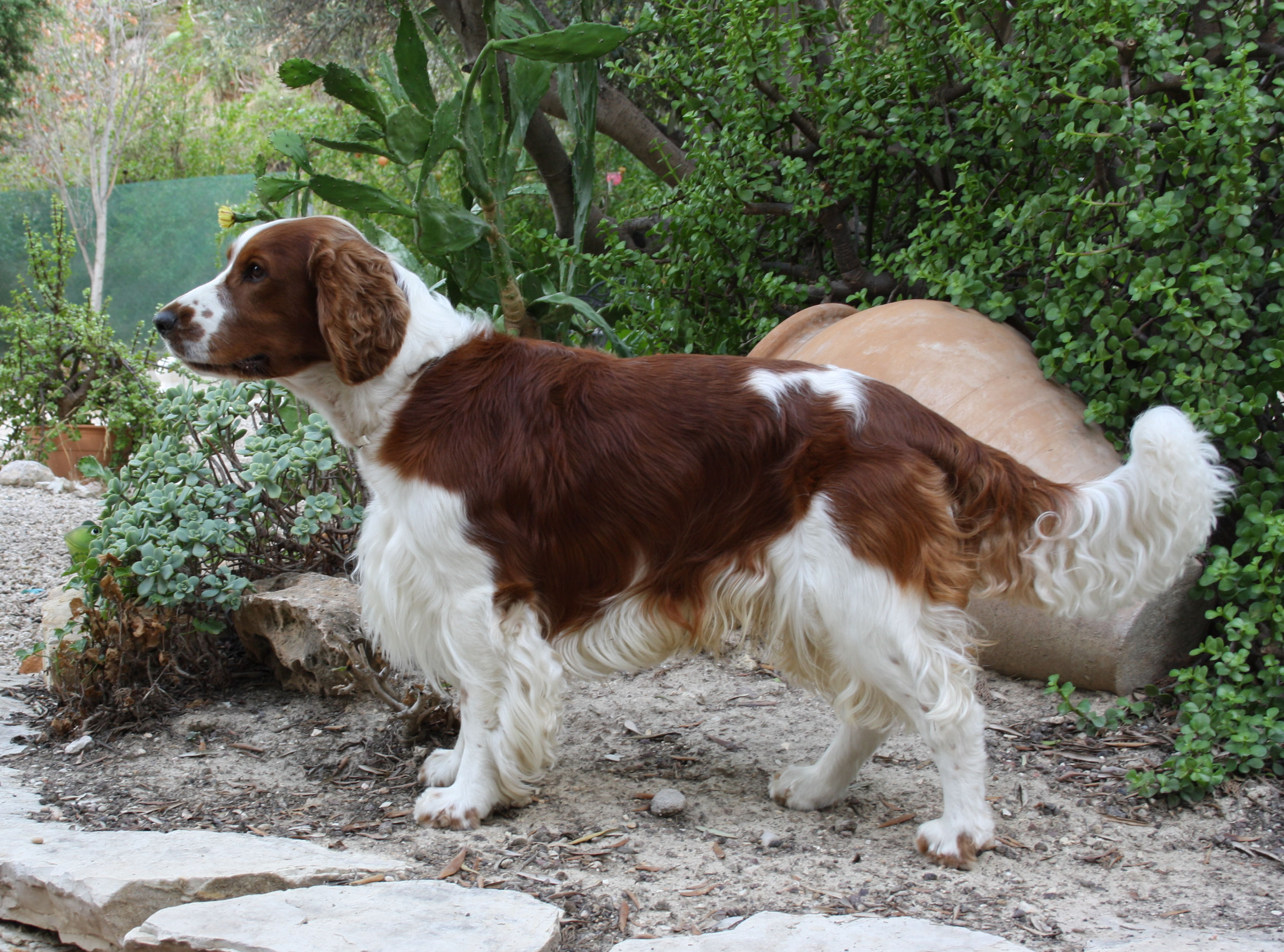
- Other names: Welsh Springer; Welsh Starter
- Common nicknames: Welshie
- Origin: Wales
Traits
| Height | Males | 46–48 cm (18–19 in) |
| | Females | 43–46 cm (17–18 in) |
- Coat: Naturally straight flat and soft to the touch, never wiry or wavy
- Colour: Rich red and white only. Any pattern is acceptable and any white area may be flecked with red ticking.
Kennel club standards
- The Kennel Club: standard
- Fédération Cynologique Internationale: standard

The Welsh Springer Spaniel (Welsh: Llamgi Cymru or Tarfgi Cymru) is a breed of dog and a member of the spaniel family. Thought to be comparable to the old Land Spaniel, they are similar to the English Springer Spaniel and historically have been referred to as both the Welsh Spaniel and the Welsh Cocker Spaniel. They were relatively unknown until a succession of victories in dog trials by the breed increased its popularity. Following recognition by The Kennel Club in 1902, the breed gained the modern name of Welsh Springer Spaniel. The breed's coat only comes in a single colour combination of white with red markings, usually in a piebald pattern. Loyal and affectionate, they can become very attached to family members and are wary of strangers. Health conditions are limited to those common among many breeds of dog, although they are affected more than average by hip dysplasia and some eye conditions. They are a working dog, bred for hunting, and while not as rare as some varieties of spaniel, they are rarer than the more widely known English Springer Spaniel with which they are sometimes confused.

== History ==
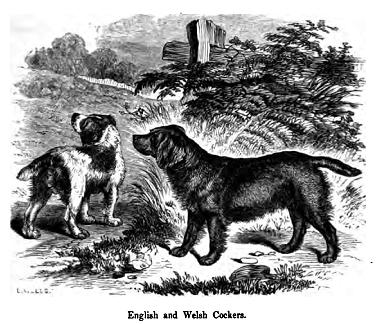
An image of English and Welsh Cockers, published in 1859

The origin of the Welsh Springer Spaniel is unknown, but dogs resembling the breed with its distinctive red and white coat are frequently depicted in old pictures and prints. This type of dog was known as the Land Spaniel, and is considered to be similar to the modern Welsh Springer. John Caius, writing in 1570, said "Spaniels whose skynnes are white and if marked with any spottes they are commonly red". It is thought that these Spaniels may have made their way into the Welsh valleys where local sportsman and hunters managed to conserve them in a pure state.

At one time called the Welsh Starter, it was used to spring game, originally for hunters using falcons. The traditional red and white colour of the Welsh Springer was once also found in English dogs, but by the early 20th century any such dogs were considered to have "died out long ago".

The Welsh Springer Spaniel was also at one time called the Welsh Spaniel, and also at one point was included in the Kennel Club (UK) studbook as Cocker Spaniels, and was known as the Welsh Cocker. During the 19th century were several different varieties of Cocker Spaniel, including the English, the Welsh and the Devonshire as the term was used to describe the size of the dog rather than the breed. Unusually, in John George Wood's 1865 book The Illustrated Natural History, an image is described showing a Welsh Cocker Spaniel as a solid coloured dark spaniel. The same inscription is used in the 1867 work The Dog in Health and Disease by Stonehenge and he further describes the Welsh Cocker and the Devonshire Cocker as "both being of a deep-liver colour". The Welsh Springer was relatively unknown during the 19th century, but this changed in 1900 when Mr A. T. Williams of Ynysygerwn won the team stake at the Sporting Spaniel Club Trials. The trials were held on Mr Williams's own estate, and it was thought that when his team defeated eight well known teams it was because of the home advantage. This was disproved when dogs from the same kennel went on to win in successive years around the UK. His conformation show champion dog Corrin was the first Welsh Springer Spaniel to be photographed.

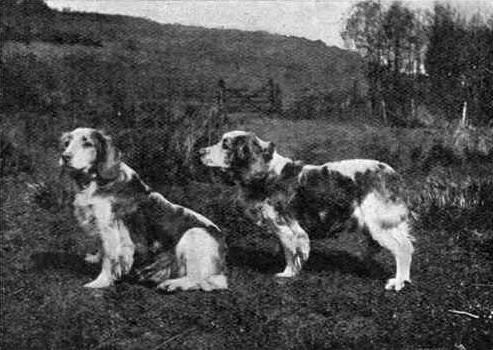
Ch. Corrin, a show dog owned by Mr A. T. Williams, photographed in two poses in 1903.

Welsh Springers were recognised by The Kennel Club, after the breed had gained popularity, in 1902 under the new name of Welsh Springer Spaniel. Until then the breed was shown alongside the English Springer Spaniel. The Welsh Springer Spaniel was transported to America in the late 19th century and gained recognition by the American Kennel Club in 1906.

World War I caused problems for the breed in the United Kingdom, and when the war was over there were no dogs whose parents had registered pedigrees. The breed restarted with the remaining unregistered dogs, and it is these dogs that formed the modern day breed. The breeders in the 1920s and 1930s developed these dogs into the type of Welsh Springer Spaniel which remains today. The Welsh Springer Spaniel Club (UK) was formed in 1923, registrations slowly increased between the wars but all records held by the breed club were destroyed in an air raid during World War II. Following the two World Wars, it was thought that no Welsh Springers remained in the United States. The breed was reintroduced, and the descendants of those dogs make up the breed today in the United States and Canada. The breed was officially imported into Australia in 1973.

In 2000, The Kennel Club registered 424 Welsh Springer Spaniels, compared with 12,599 English Springer Spaniels and 13,445 English Cocker Spaniels. Numbers remained steady, with 420 Welsh Springer Spaniels being registered in 2004, however numbers of English Springer Spaniels increased to 14,765 and English Cocker Spaniels to 16,608. Numbers remain closer to the American Cocker Spaniel which registered 610 in 2000, and 599 in 2004. The breed remains more popular than some other breeds of Spaniel, including the Clumber Spaniel, Field Spaniel, Sussex Spaniel and Irish Water Spaniel. Total registrations in the UK during 2016 fell to 299 qualifying it to be included on The Kennel Club's list of Vulnerable Native Breeds.

== Description ==
=== Appearance ===
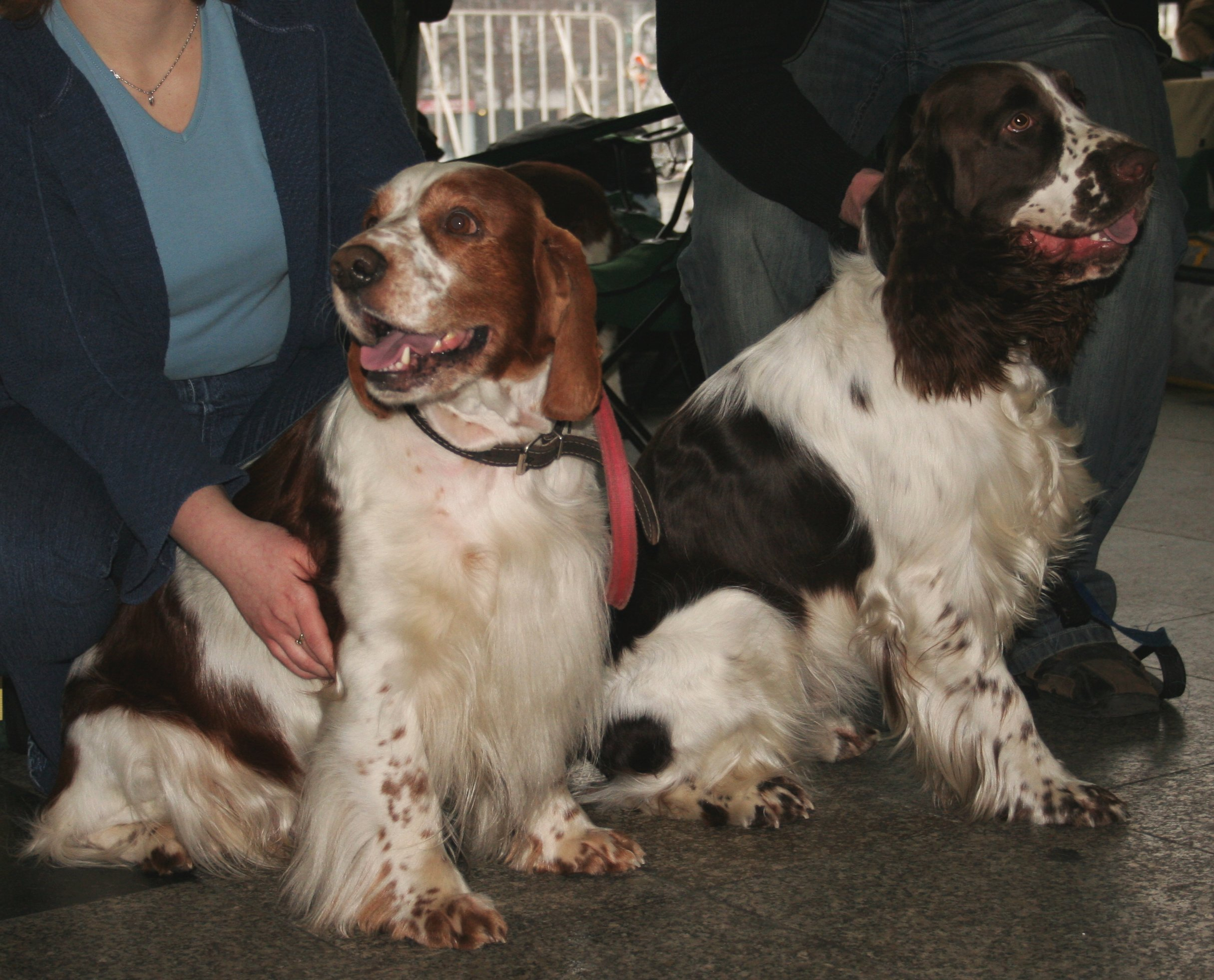
A Welsh Springer Spaniel on left, and an English Springer Spaniel on right

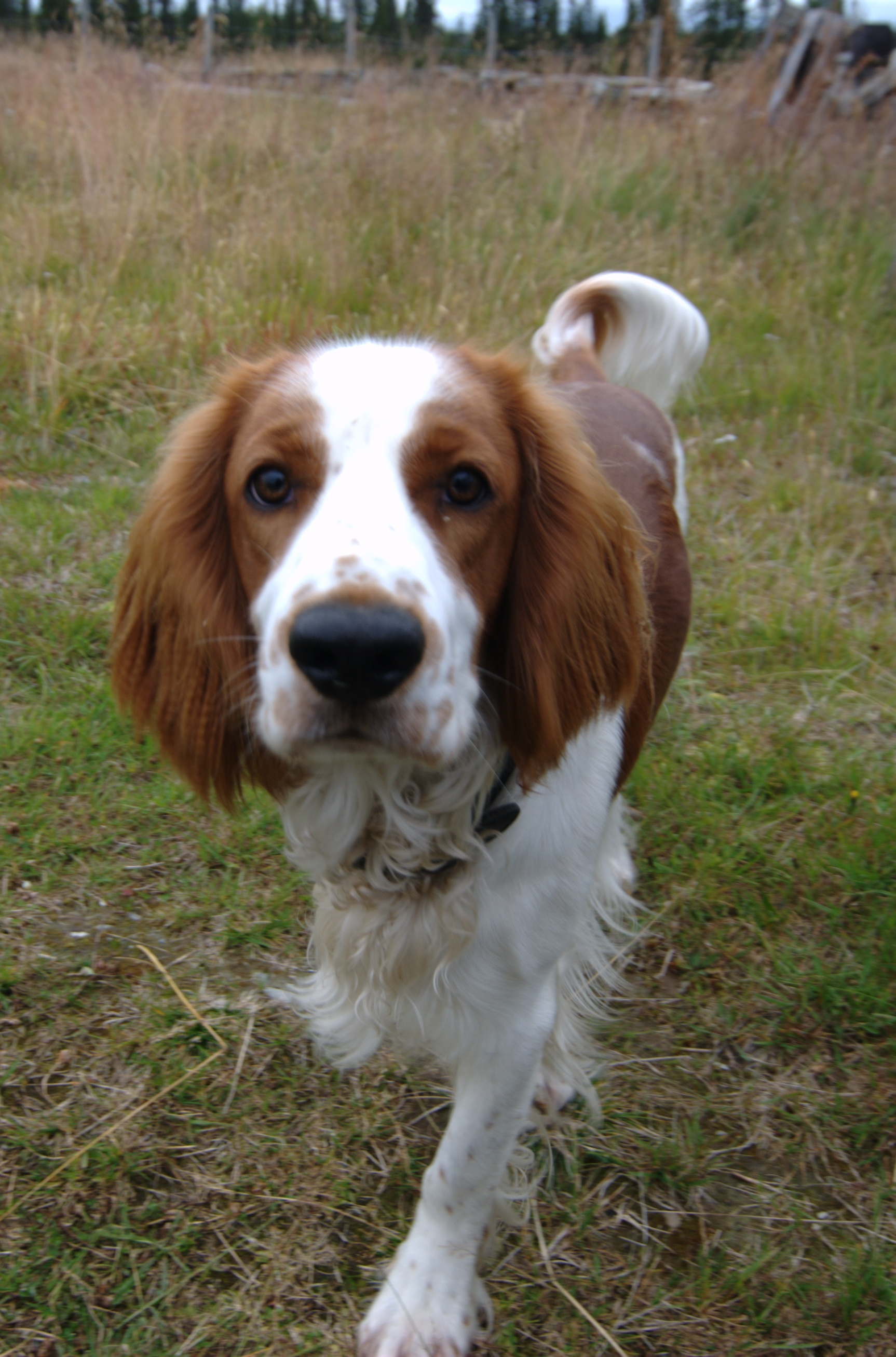
Welsh Springers are affectionate and inquisitive

The Welsh Springer Spaniel is a compact, solidly built dog, bred for hard work and endurance. Their body can give the impression of length due to its obliquely angled forequarters and developed hindquarters. The build of the Welsh Springer Spaniel should be slightly off square, meaning that the length of the dog should be slightly greater than the height at the withers. However, some dogs may be square, and this is not penalised in the show ring as long as the height is never greater than the length. Traditionally a docked breed, dependent on legislation in the country of origin, and where allowed the dew claws can be removed.

In conformation showing, eyes should be brown in colour; yellow eyes do sometimes occur but are penalised in the show ring. Ears are small, pendulous (suspended and hanging), vine-shaped and with a light setter-like feathering. Nostrils are well developed and are black or any shade of brown; a pink nose is penalised in the AKC standard for the show ring, in Britain the colour is not specified in The Kennel Club's breed standard. In showing, a scissors bite is preferred with an undershot jaw severely penalised. Unlike the English Springer Spaniel and English Cocker Spaniel, there is no divergence into show and field styles of the breed.

Male dogs are 46 to 48 centimetres (18 to 19 in) high at the withers, with females a little smaller at 43 to 46 centimetres (17 to 18 in). On average, members of the breed weigh between 16 and 20 kg (35 and 45 lb). The back of the legs, chest, and underside of the body are feathered, and the ears and tail are lightly feathered. The only colour is a rich red-and-white. Any pattern is acceptable and any white area may be flecked with red ticking.

Welsh Springers are often confused with the English Springer Spaniel, but there are marked differences. The Welsh Springer is slightly smaller, and its reddish markings on a white background as opposed to the English Springers black or liver-coloured markings. Both breeds are admired for their hunting abilities and their trademark trait of "springing" at game. This can be seen during play also, as a dog may "spring" on his toy. Some experts believe that the Welsh Springer Spaniel and the Brittany share the same ancestry as there is a great deal of resemblance between the two breeds. The colours of the Welsh Springer, while exclusive from the English Springer, appear in the Brittany and the Brittany and Welsh Springers are both of similar sizes. The Welsh Springer is larger than the English Cocker Spaniel.

=== Temperament ===
The Welsh Springer Spaniel is active, loyal, and affectionate. They may meet strangers barking when in their territory, or act aloof, cautious or wary. The breed is well known for being friendly and demonstrative to all members of the family, especially children, and accepting other pets of the household with a friendly, playful attitude.

The breed is quick to learn but can be headstrong, though with correct training can become very obedient. The Welsh Springer was bred for work and endurance, and as with many breeds of hunting dogs requires a regular exercise routine to keep them healthy and content. Without adequate exercise, a Welsh Springer Spaniel may appear hyperactive. Some Welsh Springers can become clingy towards their owners and suffer separation anxiety when alone.

== Health ==
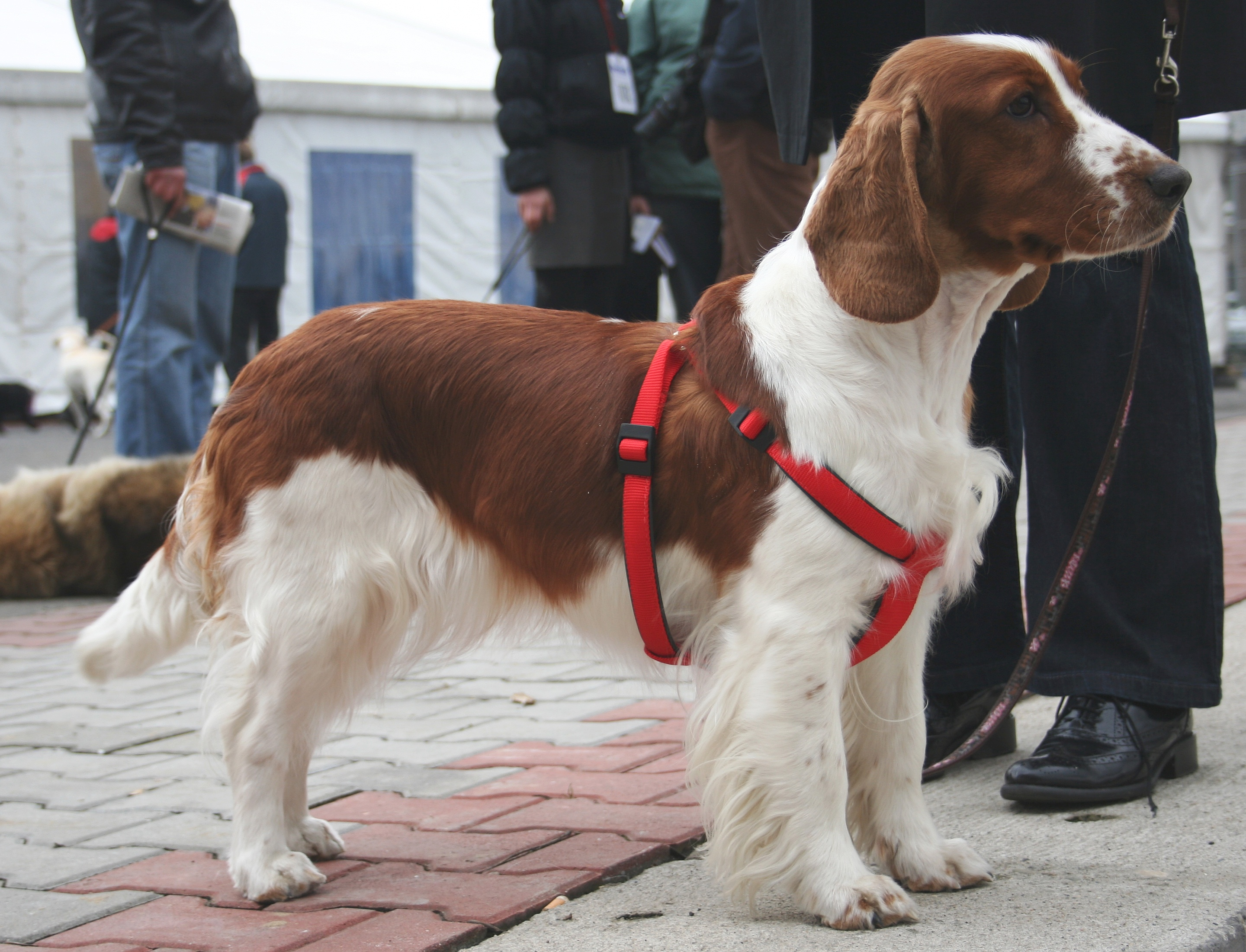
Welsh Springer Spaniel in a dog harness.

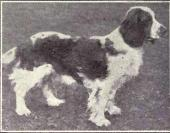
A photograph of a Welsh Springer Spaniel from 1915.

The Welsh Springer is generally a healthy breed, but some can suffer conditions common to many breeds such as hip dysplasia, Canine glaucoma and like other dogs with pendulous ears, they are prone to ear infections such as otitis externa. Some Welsh Springer Spaniels are predisposed to become overweight. In a survey of over a hundred breeds of dog conducted in 1997, the Welsh Springer Spaniel was ranked 14th for worst hip score, with the average score of the breed being 18.45. A 2024 UK study found a life expectancy of 14 years for the breed compared to an average of 12.7 for purebreeds and 12 for crossbreeds.

=== Eye disorders ===
Welsh Springers can be prone to entropion, which is a disorder that affects the eyelids. The condition causes them to curl inwards, pressing the eyelashes against the surface of the eye itself and causing them to scratch it. This can lead to irritation and damage to the cornea. In most cases it only affects the lower eyelid on one or both eyes, but in some cases the upper eyelid can be affected as well. Symptoms can include tearing, squinting, the rubbing of the eyes, thick discharge from the eyes and rolling of the eyelid along with wetness on the hairs next to the eyelids. There is no medical treatment for entropion, and surgical correction may be necessary depending on the severity of the case. This condition may be present soon after birth, or later in life as a secondary condition to other eye related diseases or infections. Other breeds also affected by the condition include the Chow Chow, Great Dane, Golden Retriever and the English Springer Spaniel.

Narrow/closed angle glaucoma is an autosomal dominant inheritable trait in the breed. It is a leading cause of blindness in dogs, and is where there is increased fluid pressure within the eye. If the fluid is not reduced, the pressure causes permanent damage to the retina and optic nerve. Loss of eyesight can happen as quickly as within 24 hours if the pressure if elevated enough, or slowly over time if it is only a mild elevation. The sudden, rapid elevation of pressure is more common with narrow/closed angle glaucoma which is more common to the breed than the slower open angle glaucoma. Symptoms can include redness in the eye, the eye itself looking cloudy, sensitivity to light and the dog may rub at their eye, or even rub it along other objects and carpet as the condition is moderate to extremely painful. Treatment can vary depending on the severity of the condition but if inherited glaucoma appears in one eye then it usually occurs in the other eye eventually.

== See also ==
- Hunting dog
- Sporting Group
