= Loteki Supernatural Being =

British show dog

Ch. Loteki Supernatural Being
- Loteki Supernatural Being at the presentation of the best-in-show trophy in 1999 at Westminster
- Other name: Kirby
- Species: Canis lupus familiaris
- Breed: Papillon
- Sex: Male
- Born: December 31, 1990
- Died: February 12, 2007 (aged 16)
- Occupation: Show dog
- Title: Best In Show at the Westminster Dog Show
- Term: 1999
- Predecessor: Ch. Fairewood Frolic
- Successor: Ch. Salilyn 'N Erin's Shameless
- Parents: Ch. Loteki Supercharger (sire); Ch. Loteki Denzel Fortuneteller (dam)
- Offspring: Ch. Cadaga Civil Action (multi-time best of breed at Westminster)
- Awards: 31 Best-in-show awards, including Westminster Kennel Club Dog Show, World Dog Show and the Royal Canadian Show

Ch. Loteki Supernatural Being (December 31, 1990 – February 12, 2007), also known as Kirby, was a Papillon known for being the only dog to have won three major international dog shows in the same year and being the oldest winner of the Westminster Kennel Club Dog Show at eight years old, until his record was broken in 2009 by Clussexx Three D Grinchy Glee at ten years old.

== Early life ==
Kirby was one of four in a litter born on December 31, 1990, to Ch. Loteki Supercharger (Rico) and Ch. Loteki Denzel Fortuneteller (Gypsy). One of his litter mates was Am/Can CH. Loteki Turbocharger, CDX who became a therapy dog and won multiple groups in Canada.

== Show history ==
Kirby's first Westminster victory came in 1993, when he won Best of Breed. In 1996 he became the first Papillon to place top in the Toy group, he would end up placing second overall at the 1996 Westminster Dog Show, being defeated by Ch. Clussexx Country Sunrise, the very first Clumber Spaniel to win at Westminster.

In 1997, he lost his best of breed title at Westminster to CH Loteki Good Time Charlie, a nephew of his. However, in 1998 he regained that title and placed third in the toy group.

In 1999, Kirby became the first Papillon to win best in show at Westminster. He also became the oldest dog to ever win at Westminster at eight years old, a record which would stand until 2009 with the ten-year-old Sussex Spaniel Clussexx Three D Grinchy Glee. The victory at Westminster in 1999 added to a remarkable 31 best in show trophies, including winning the World Dog Show in Helsinki, Finland, and the Royal Canadian Show in 1998 in the same show year. Kirby is the first dog to have ever won at both Westminster and the World Dog Show.

Kirby returned to the show ring in 2005 at the age of fourteen at the Papillon Club of America's National Speciality Show in Cincinnati, Ohio. He was entered in the Veterans Class, a class for Papillons over the age of eight. On the first day of the competition, Kirby, who had previously won the National Papillon Speciality on three occasions, won the ribbon for best Veteran Dog. On day two, Kirby returned to the ring for the first round of cuts for best of breed, but with a different handler. Cheslie Pickett, less than two years older than Kirby, led him around the ring with his normal handler John Oulton taking charge of Nemo, Kirby's son. Kirby was chosen by judge Sandra Goose Allen as the winner of the 2005 Papillon Club of America national specialty, making his handler Cheslie Pickett the youngest ever to have won the National Papillon Speciality, and Kirby the oldest dog ever to have won and the only dog to have won it four times.
