= Norfolk Spaniel =

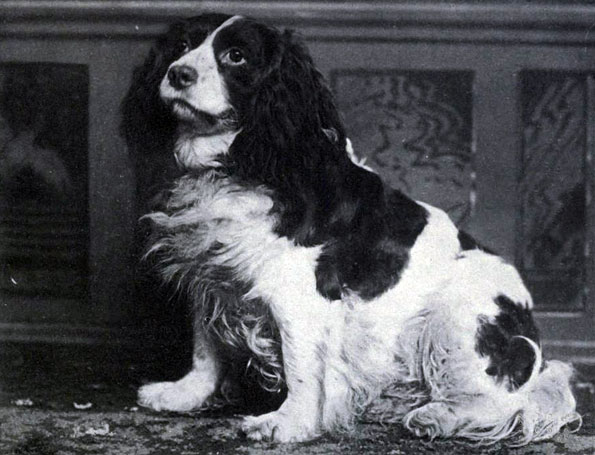
- Dash II, Norfolk Spaniel show dog who competed at the Westminster Kennel Club Dog Show in 1886 and placed second in the large spaniel class.
- Other names: Shropshire Spaniel
- Origin: United Kingdom
- Breed status: Extinct

The Norfolk Spaniel or Shropshire Spaniel is a breed of dog which has been extinct since the early 20th century. It was originally thought to have originated from the work of one of the Dukes of Norfolk, but this theory was disproven after being in doubt during the later part of the 19th century. The term was also used to designate springer type spaniels that were neither Sussex nor Clumber Spaniels, and attempts were made to use it to specify a breed that would later become known as the English Springer Spaniel.

With a liver-and-white or black-and-white coat, the Norfolk Spaniel was described as being a large Cocker Spaniel. The Spaniel Club set out a breed standard for Norfolk Spaniels, but specimens of the breed varied greatly across England. Members of the breed were difficult to train, but formed a strong attachment with their owners and were useful for hunting both on land and in water. The breed ceased to exist after 1903, when it was rolled into the new English Springer Spaniel breed created by The Kennel Club to contain all spaniels of this type.

== History ==
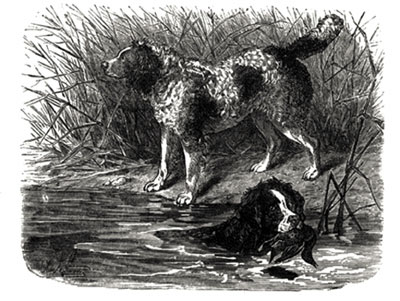
A drawing of Norfolk Spaniels from 1881, showing their prowess at retrieving from water

The Norfolk Spaniel was believed to have come about from a cross of spaniels with the Black and Tan Terrier, which was cultivated by an unspecified Duke of Norfolk. However, later historians disagree with this theory, saying that the Duke of Norfolk's spaniels were of the King Charles type and that terrier stock had nothing to do with the origins of the Norfolk Spaniel. The theory of the Duke of Norfolk-based origins of the Norfolk Spaniel was thought disproved by the investigation of James Farrow, a 19th-century spaniel breeder, who wrote to Henry Fitzalan-Howard, 15th Duke of Norfolk in order to find out the truth about the origins of the breed. The Duke responded, denying any connection to the breed, although he did state that his grandfather, Henry Howard, 13th Duke of Norfolk, owned Sussex Spaniels. The letter from the Duke was printed in The Kennel Gazette in 1899. An alternative origin was proposed by Rawdon Briggs Lee in volume two of his 1897 work A History and Description of the Modern Dogs of Great Britain and Ireland. Lee argued that the Norfolk Spaniel was descended from a crossing of a curly-coated water spaniel and a Sussex Spaniel or another strain of land spaniel.

In the 18th century, spaniels were split into three categories: land spaniels, water spaniels and toy spaniels. The land spaniels were split into two further types, the Cocker Spaniel and the Springer Spaniel. It was within the Springer Spaniel type that the Norfolk Spaniel was placed, along with the Sussex Spaniel and the Clumber Spaniel. By the 1860s, the breed was described as the "commonest breed in England", but with a description that varies so much that the only standard point is that they averaged 16 inches (41 cm) in height at the withers.

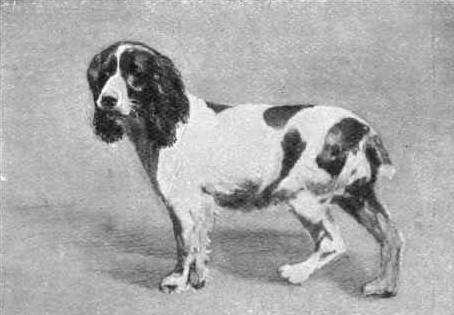
An English Springer Spaniel, from 1903

The Spaniel Club was formed in 1885, and issued a breed standard for the Norfolk Spaniel, recognising it as a variety of spaniel. However, the general public saw it only as a generic land spaniel. By the 1890s, the breed had become common throughout the counties of England, leading dog writers such as Rawdon Briggs Lee to question the authenticity of its origins, or that the various liver and white spaniels from around England constituted a single breed; "Personally, I do not consider the liver and white spaniel any particular variety at all, nor do I believe that it has ever been indigenous to Norfolk." He states that similar dogs exist in Devonshire that do not trace ancestry to Norfolk, and that liver and white spaniels pre-date the breeding of the Black and Tan Terrier with an ordinary spaniel. F.H.F. Mercer described the breed in 1890 as being "virtually extinct in its purity", with its liver and white colours running through any numbers of miscellaneous spaniels, and he too discredits the origins involving the Duke of Norfolk.

The Kennel Club (UK) designated all medium legged spaniels which were not Clumber nor Sussex Spaniels as English Springer Spaniels in 1902. The Norfolk Spaniel was included under this designation, with the term "Norfolk Spaniel" considered for use to cover these types of spaniels, but ultimately rejected as the Club believed that the breed was always liver and white in colour. The change in terminology was not smooth or immediate, with James Watson in his 1905 work, The Dog Book, still referring to the Norfolk Spaniel as a breed name. In the modern era, the Norfolk Spaniel is thought to be the previous name for the English Springer Spaniel, prior to recognition by The Kennel Club (UK).

== Temperament ==
The Norfolk Spaniel would typically be unhappy when they were separated from their owners, as they formed a strong attachment. Compared to the springer spaniels of the 19th century, they were more ill-tempered, and could be headstrong and wilful if not successfully broken. Some members of the breed could be noisy, and were described as "babbling" and making noise on the hunt in a similar fashion to hounds, while others were far quieter.

Its use in hunting was varied, and the breed was useful both on land and in the water. In particular, it became successful in America and towards the beginning of the 20th century were popular in the area around Boston. They were described by the Spaniel Club of America as being as good in the water as the Chesapeake Bay Retriever.

== Appearance ==
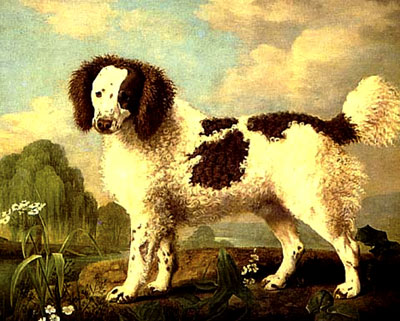
A liver and white Norfolk Spaniel

The breed was a freckled white dog with either liver or black markings, the breed standard in 1859 set their measurements at 17–18 inches (43–46 cm) in height at the withers. It had long legs, feathered ears, a white area on forehead, which was said to "[add] a great deal to his beauty", but there were differences from the English Springer, including a broader skull and shorter neck. It was also compared to the English Setter in its build, shape, and proportions, although it was a much smaller size. While other field spaniels of this era displayed colours other than liver and white or liver and black, the Norfolk did not. The breed-specific qualities varied greatly as in some places the breeding lines were not kept particularly pure, those lines having had stock from Sussex and Clumber Spaniels bred into them.

By the end of the 19th century the description of a Norfolk Spaniel had changed slightly, The Spaniel Club breed standard for a Norfolk Spaniel in 1897 was for the animal to have a coat of either black and white or liver and white which was not curly, a reasonably heavy body and legs which are longer than other field spaniels but shorter than the Irish Water Spaniel, a deep chest with long sloping shoulders and strength in the back and loins, as well as features typical of a spaniel such as lobular ears. This standard also included the requirement for the tail to be docked. In brief, the standard described the Norfolk as simply looking like a large cocker spaniel.
