= Salilyn 'N Erin's Shameless =

English Springer Spaniel

Ch. Salilyn 'N Erin's Shameless
- Other name: Samantha
- Species: Canis lupus familiaris
- Breed: English Springer Spaniel
- Sex: Female
- Born: 1995
- Title: Best In Show at the Westminster Dog Show
- Term: 2000
- Predecessor: Ch. Loteki Supernatural Being
- Successor: Ch. Special Times Just Right
- Owner: Kellie FitzGerald
- Parents: Ch. Salilyn's Condor (sire); Ch. Salilyn's High Regard (dam)
- Weight: 42 lb (19 kg)

Ch. Salilyn 'N Erin's Shameless (born 1995) also known as Samantha, was an English Springer Spaniel, best known for being Best in Show at the Westminster Kennel Club Dog Show in February 2000. Her sire was Ch. Salilyn's Condor, Best in Show winner at Westminster in 1993, Samantha became the first offspring of a previous Best in Show winner at Westminster to take the same prize.

== Early life ==
Samantha's sire was Ch. Salilyn's Condor, the Best in Show winner at the Westminster Kennel Club Dog Show in 1993. Her great–great grandfather, Ch. Salilyn's Aristocrat won Best of Breed at Westminster in 1967. Co-owned by Julia Gasow, a well-known English Springer Spaniel breeder since the 1940s.

== Show history ==
She was ranked the top sporting dog in America in 1998. At the Westminster Kennel Club Dog Show in 1999, she won Best of Breed but lost in the Sporting Group to the Gordon Setter Ch. Bit O Gold Titan Treasure, who was retired after the show.

In 2000, she won Best in Show at Westminster, in the event's 124th year. She beat a Doberman Pinscher, a Shih Tzu, a Basset Hound, a Bedlington Terrier, a Pembroke Welsh Corgi and the favorite, the Poodle Ch. Lakecove That's My Boy, the top ranked dog of 1999 in America. Her judge for Best in Show, Chester Collier, said of her victory at the garden, "The Springer Spaniel, for her breed, had a slightly better head, and when you say that, you've said it all." At one point during the celebrations, she jumped into the silver champion's bowl. Samantha became the first ever offspring of a previous Best in Show winner. Following her victory, she appeared on Good Morning America and Later Today, she was retired following Westminster, her fiftieth Best in Show of her career.

She lived in retirement with her owner/handler Kellie FitzGerald. She had a single litter of eight puppies, seven of which went on to win their championships.
