= Salilyn's Condor =

English Springer spaniel

Ch. Salilyn's Condor
- Other name: Robert
- Species: Canis lupus familiaris
- Breed: English Springer Spaniel
- Sex: Male
- Born: October 5, 1987
- Occupation: Show dog
- Title: Best In Show at the Westminster Dog Show
- Term: 1993
- Predecessor: Ch. Registry's Lonesome Dove
- Successor: Ch. Chidley Willum The Conqueror
- Owners: Donna and Roger Herzig; Julia Gasow
- Parent: Ch. Salilyn's Aristocrat (great-grandsire)
- Offspring: Ch. Salilyn 'N Erin's Shameless
- Weight: 45 lb (20 kg)

Ch. Salilyn's Condor (born October 5, 1987) also known as Robert, was an English Springer Spaniel, best known for being Best in Show at the Westminster Kennel Club Dog Show in Feb. 1993. He was the first Westminster winner to sire another, when his daughter Ch. Salilyn 'N Erin's Shameless won Best in Show in 2000.

== Early life ==
Robert was co–owned by Donna and Roger Herzig of Louisville, Kentucky, and Julia Gasow of Troy, Michigan. One of Robert's great grandfathers was Ch. Salilyn's Aristocrat, who won Best of Breed at the Westminster Kennel Club Dog Show in 1967.

== Show history ==
Immediately prior to Westminster, there is a series of specialty shows in New York to serve as warm–ups for the main competition. At the first Long Island Kennel Club Dog Show independent event in February 1990, Robert took the Best in Show title.

In competition at the Westminster Kennel Club Dog Show in 1992, Robert made it all the way to the Best in Show competition before being defeated by the Wire Fox Terrier Ch. Registry's Lonesome Dove. Robert was the top winning dog in America in 1992 beating some 115,651 other dogs, leading into the 1993 Westminster Show at Madison Square Garden. During that year he had won 123 groups, winning the Ken–L–Ration award in the process. Prior to Westminster he had won the American Spaniel Club's event in December 1992 for the third year in a row, tying a previous record set in the 1930s. He finished the 1992 season with his hundredth Best in Show victory, a record for sporting dogs.

The previous winner of Westminster returned in the 1993 competition, along with Robert and three other dogs that made it to the previous year's Best in Show round. While Ch. Registry's Lonesome Dove was thought to be the favorite, it was Robert who was predicted to be her main opposition. In front of 10,000 spectators, Robert took the title of Best in Show at Westminster for 1993, beating seven other dogs in the final round including a German Shepherd Dog, a Borzoi and a Pekingese. Best in Show judge Barbara Heller said of Robert's victory, "The dog is as near to perfection as possible, He showed his heart out and I had a really hard time deciding. I always think it's easy to judge when you have good dogs, but this time it wasn't that easy because all seven were outstanding." He became the first English Springer Spaniel to take the title since 1972.

Following his win, he was retired from conformation showing. Robert's daughter Ch. Salilyn 'N Erin's Shameless became the only offspring of a previous Westminster winner to win the same prize when she won Best in Show at the event in 2000.

== Pedigree ==
Ch. Salilyn's Aristocrat
Ch. Telltale Author
Telltale Victoria
Ch. Salilyn's Dynasty
Ch. Salilyn's Private Stock
Ch. Stepney's Cinderella
Ch. Salilyn's Delight
Ch. Salilyn's Condor
Ch. Filicia's Bequest
Ch. Salilyn's Private Stock
Ch. Salilyn's Sonnet
Ch. Salilyn's Emblem
Ch. Salilyn's Design
Ch. Salilyn's Prima Donna
Salilyn's Preference
