= Just right =

Just right may refer to:

- "Just right", a repeated observation by Goldilocks in "Goldilocks and the Three Bears"
- Just Right, a breakfast cereal brand
- Just Right (EP), by Got7, 2015
- "Just Right", a song by Raheem DeVaughn, 2019

== See also ==
- Special Times Just Right (1997–2012), a prize-winning Bichon Frise
- Volume III: Just Right, a 1992 album by Soul II Soul
