= Buster (spaniel) =

Dog recipient of the Dickin Medal

Buster (2002–2015), an English Springer Spaniel, was a military detection dog who was active during the Iraq War. Because of his actions in discovering a hidden weapons cache, the dog was credited with saving service personnel from insurgents operating in the southern Iraqi town of Safwan. He was awarded the Dickin Medal, referred to as being the animals' Victoria Cross.

== Military career ==
Buster worked with his handler, Sergeant Danny Morgan, since 2002, and they worked together at the Golden Jubilee of Elizabeth II celebrations and at the 2002 Commonwealth Games in Manchester.

Buster was considered to be so valuable to the military that he had his own protective gear in case of a chemical or biological attack. He was trained to enter a sealed pen if a warning sound started. The pen was equipped with a motor that pumped air through a gas mask filter.

== Off duty ==
When not serving with the military, Buster lived at home with his handler Danny Morgan, his wife and his daughter Emma. Morgan remarked of the connection between the dog and Emma, "She was upset when I went off to war but wept buckets when she was saying goodbye to Buster. She's been sending him more treats than me since we arrived".

== Dickin medal ==
Buster and his handler were assigned to the Duke of Wellington's Regiment in the southern Iraqi town of Safwan in early 2003, when British troops were experiencing random rocket attacks. Following three failed searches of a property suspected to be the headquarters of an extremist group, Buster was called in. The spaniel found a concealed cache of weapons which were hidden in a wall cavity, covered with a sheet of tin and then had a wardrobe pushing in front of it. Items in the cache included an AK-47, grenades and bomb making equipment. Buster was awarded a Dickin Medal for his efforts, referred to as being the Victoria Cross for animals. He became the 60th animal to be awarded the medal since its introduction in 1943.

At the time of the action for which he was awarded a Dickin Medal, Buster was the only arms and explosives search dog working in Iraq. He was awarded his Medal at the Crufts dog show in Birmingham, England, in March 2005. His Dickin Medal citation reads, "In March 2003... in Iraq... Arms and explosives search dog, Buster, located an arsenal of weapons and explosives hidden behind a false wall in a property linked with an extremist group." He "is considered responsible for saving the lives of service personnel and civilians. Following the find, all attacks ceased and shortly afterwards troops replaced their steel helmets with berets."

The Dickin Medal is often referred to as the animal metaphorical equivalent of the Victoria Cross.

== Post Iraq service and death ==
By 2007 Buster was with the RAF at Rosyth. He was selected for service in Afghanistan. Buster retired but remained the RAF Police mascot and his handler Flight Sergeant Barrow wrote a book - Buster: The Dog Who Saved A Thousand Lives. In 2015, the Royal Air Force announced Buster's death.

== See also ==
- List of individual dogs
