= Hip score =

Veterinary hip dysplasia test

Hip scoring is a procedure used to determine the degree of hip dysplasia in dogs and other animals and reporting the findings in a standard way. The hip score is the sum of the points awarded for each of nine radiographic features of both hip joints.

The British Veterinary Association uses the following criteria to determine hip score:

1. Norberg Angle
2. Subluxation
3. Cranial Acetabular Edge
4. Dorsal Acetabular Edge
5. Cranial Effective Acetabular Rim
6. Acetabular Fossa
7. Caudal Acetabular Edge
8. Femoral Head/Neck Exostosis
9. Femoral Head Recontouring

The lower the score, the less the degree of dysplasia present. The minimum (best) score for each hip is zero, and the maximum (worst) is 53, giving a range for the total of 0 to 106. Each hip is scored separately under the BVA, so within the UK scores are usually displayed as two numbers separated by a forward slash (e.g. 2/6). The highest score of one of both hips (BVA) is taken to provide a score for international comparison.

The following table compares the scores recognised by Orthopaedic Foundation for Animals (OFA), Fédération Cynologique Internationale (FCI), the British Veterinary Association (BVA) and Verein für Deutsche Schäferhunde (SV).

OFA (USA)	FCI (European)	BVA (UK/Australia) 1 Hip	SV (Germany)
E	A-1	0	Normal
G	A-2	1-3	Normal
F	B-1	4-6	Normal
B	B-2	7-8	Fast ["almost"] Normal
M	C	9-18	Noch Zugelassen ["still permitted/allowed"]
Mod	D	19-30	Mittlere ["intermediate"]
S	E	>30	Schwere ["heavy"/"severe"]

British Veterinarian Association

The average hip scores in the year 2005 for popular breeds from Australia are tabulated below: (Scores of both hips together)

Breed	Average score
Airedale Terrier	13
Alaskan Malamute	11
Beauceron	14
Belgian Shepherd	9
Bernese Mountain Dog	11
Border Collie	9
Bull Mastiff	23
Cavalier King Charles Spaniel	15
Curly Coated Retriever	11
Dogue de Bordeaux	22
Doberman	9
German Shepherd Dog	13
Golden Retriever	16
Irish Setter	15
Japanese Akita	11
Labrador Retriever	12
Mastiff	11
Newfoundland	21
Old English Sheep Dog	17
Rhodesian Ridgeback	7
Rottweiler	10
Samoyed	19
Siberian Husky	6
St. Bernard	18
Staffordshire Bull Terrier	12
Weimaraner	10
