= Continental Toy Spaniel =

Belgian and French breed of dog

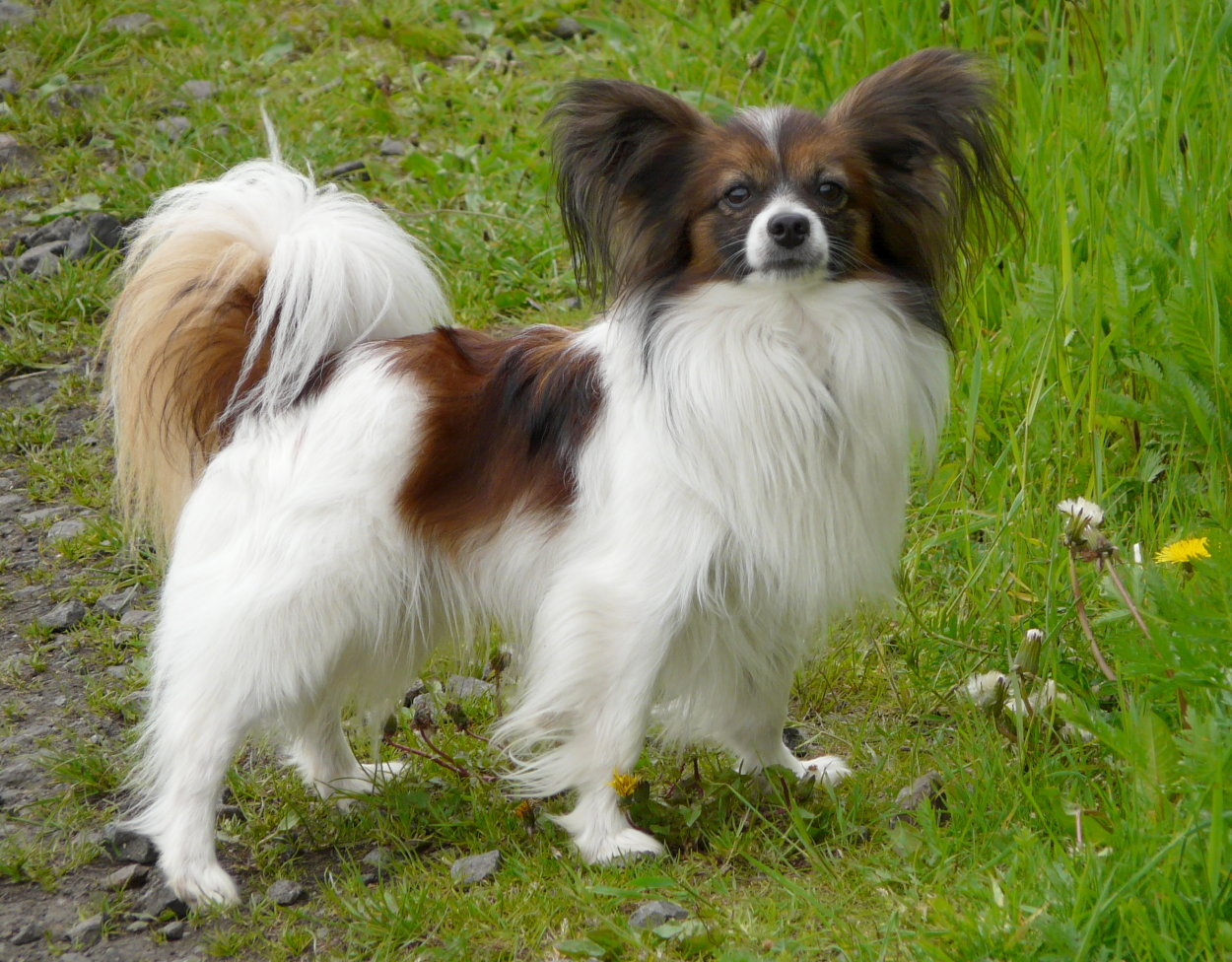
- Papillon type

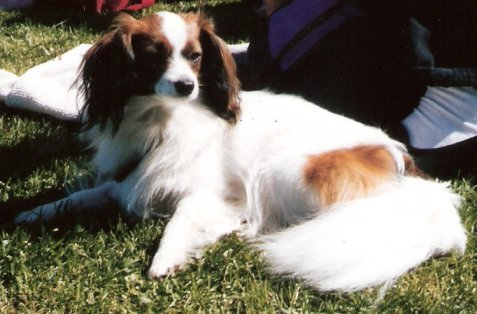
- Phalène type
- Other names: Épagneul Nain Continental; Continental Miniature Spaniel
- Origin: Belgium; France
Traits
- Height: not over 28 cm
- Weight: 1.5–2.5 kg; 2.5–5 kg
- Coat: long, fine, wavy, single-layered
- Colour: white, with patches of any colour
Kennel club standards
- Société Centrale Canine: standard
- Fédération Cynologique Internationale: standard

The Épagneul Nain Continental or Continental Toy Spaniel is a Belgian and French breed of dog of spaniel type and of miniature or toy size. It has two sub-types, distinguished only by the shape and carriage of their ears: those of the Papillon (French for 'butterfly') are erect, while those of the Phalène (French for 'moth') are pendent; in all other respects they are identical.

== History ==
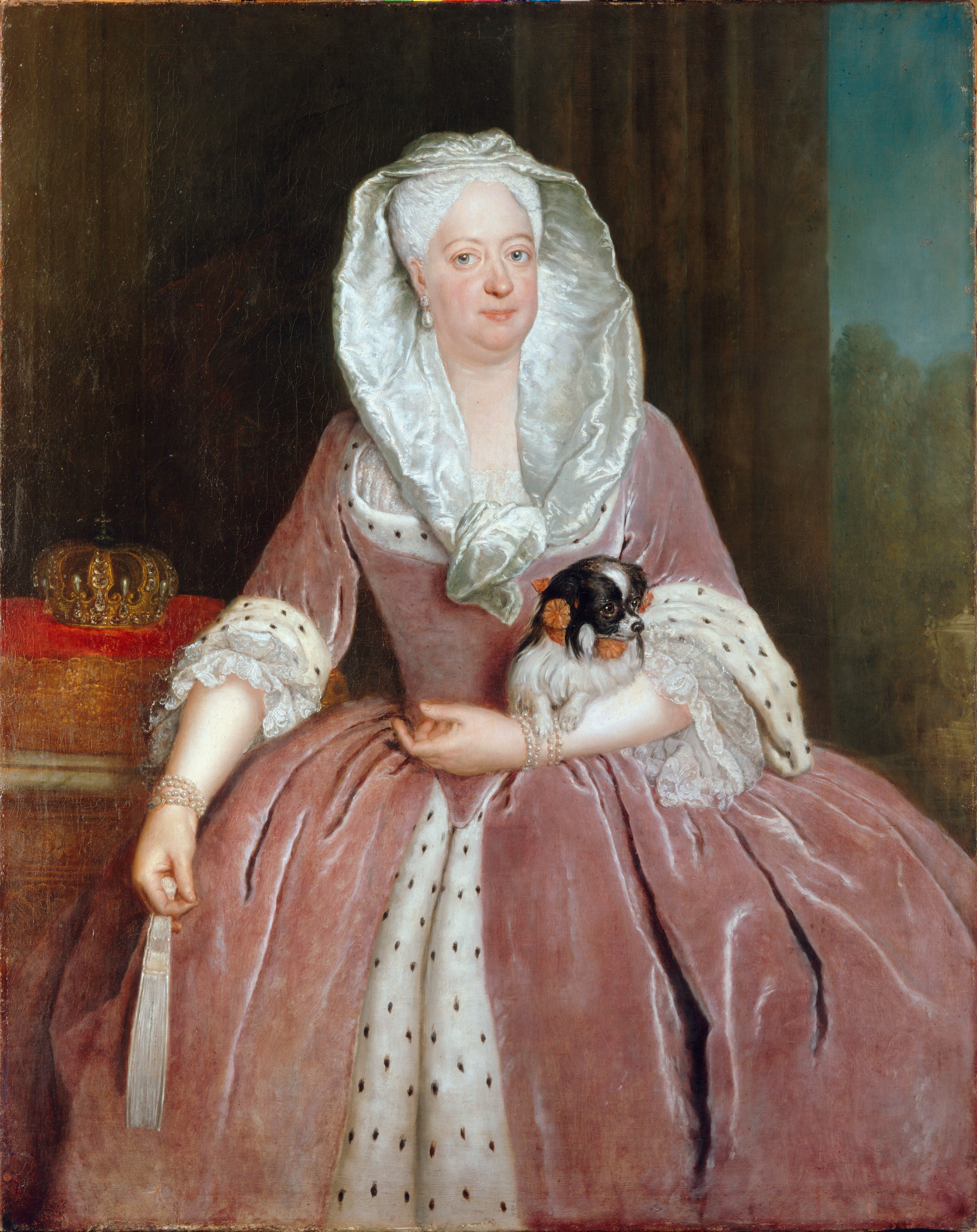
Antoine Pesne, portrait of Queen Sophie Dorothea of Prussia with a miniature spaniel, 1737

Lapdogs of miniature spaniel type appear in paintings from the sixteenth century onwards, in the works of Titian, Paolo Veronese, Pierre Mignard, Gonzales Coques, Antoine Watteau and Jean-Honoré Fragonard among others.

The Papillon was first recognized by the American Kennel Club (AKC) in 1935 with the formation of the Papillon Club of America. By the end of World War 2, the club was no longer functioning, but it was reactivated in 1948, with its first postwar specialty held in September 1954. In 1999, Ch. Loteki Supernatural Being (call name "Kirby") owned and handled by John Oulton of Norwalk, Connecticut, became the first Papillon to win the prestigious "Best in Show" at the annual Westminster Kennel Club dog show. Kirby also won international success for the breed by taking the World Dog Show in Helsinki, Finland, and the Royal Invitational in Canada in 1998. Papillons also enjoy success today in competitive fields outside of conformation, including obedience and agility.

In 2019, Planet Waves Forever Young Daydream Believers (call name "Dylan") became the first Papillon to win Best in Show at Crufts.

== Characteristics ==
The coat is predominantly white, with patches of any colour; only on the head the extent of the colour exceeds that of the white. The maximum height at the withers is approximately 28 cm; there are two classes for body weight, 1.5–2.5 kg and 2.5–5 kg.

Two ear variations of this breed are seen, the completely upright ears of the more common Papillon, and the dropped spaniel-like ears of the Phalène. The Phalène are likely a throwback to their spaniel ancestors. The AKC and the Fédération Cynologique Internationale (FCI) consider the Phalène and the Papillon the same breed.

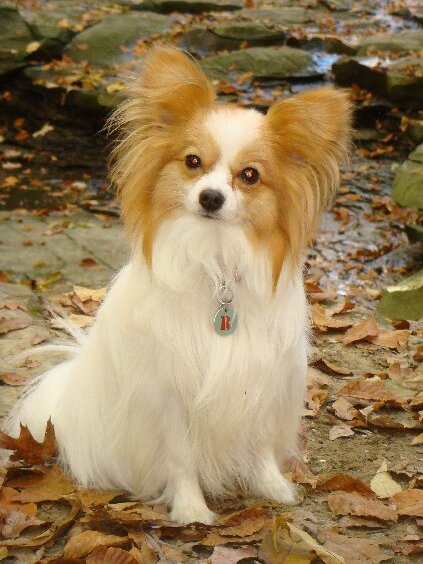
Papillon sub-type, with upright "butterfly" ears

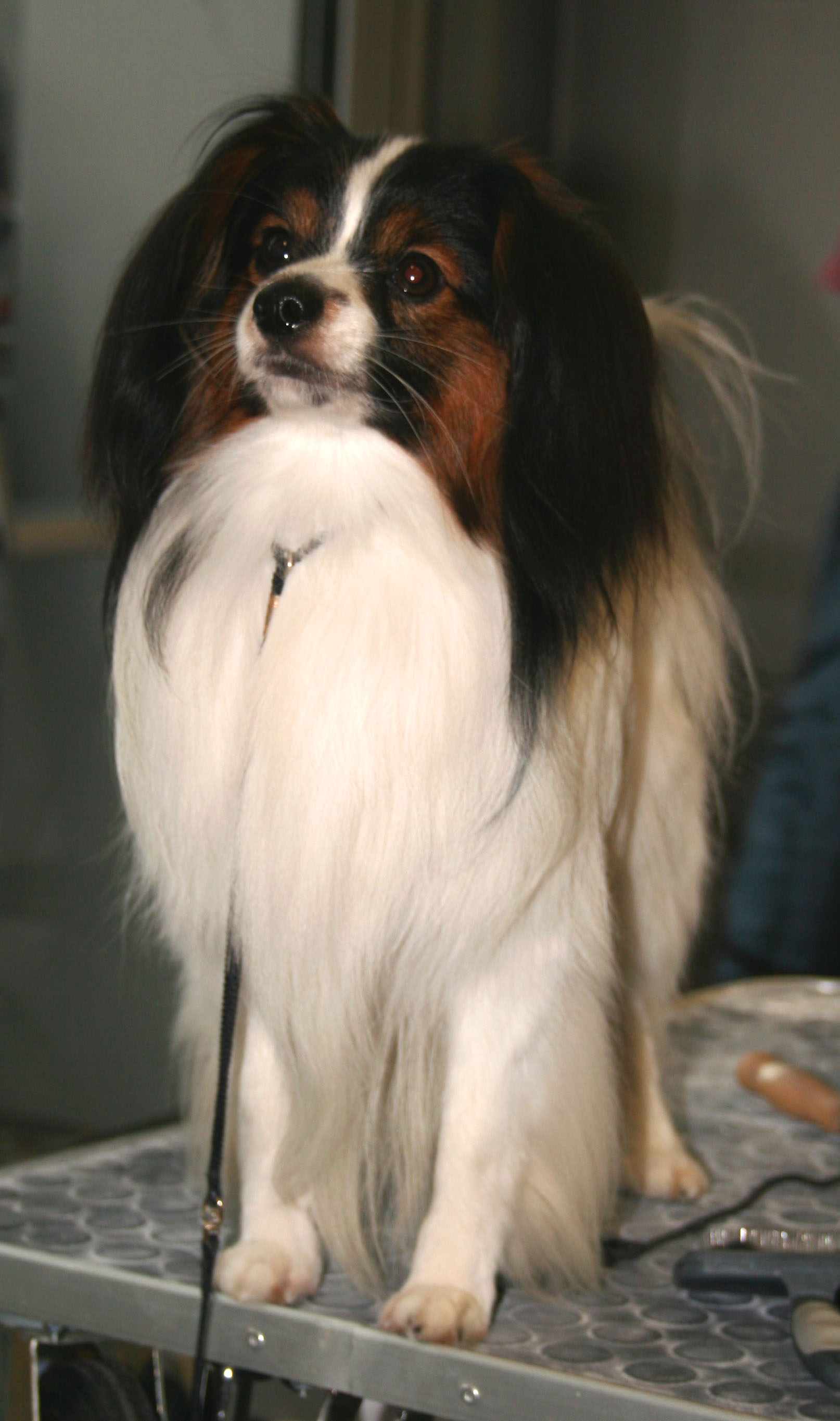
Phalène sub-type, with pendent ears

== Health ==
A 2024 UK study found a life expectancy of 14.5 years for the breed compared to an average of 12.7 for purebreeds and 12 for crossbreeds.

Papillons have only minor health concerns, although patellar luxation, seizures, and dental problems can be issues. Additionally, they can be at risk for progressive retinal atrophy, intervertebral disk disease, and allergies.
