= Sussex Spaniel =

Type of dog breed

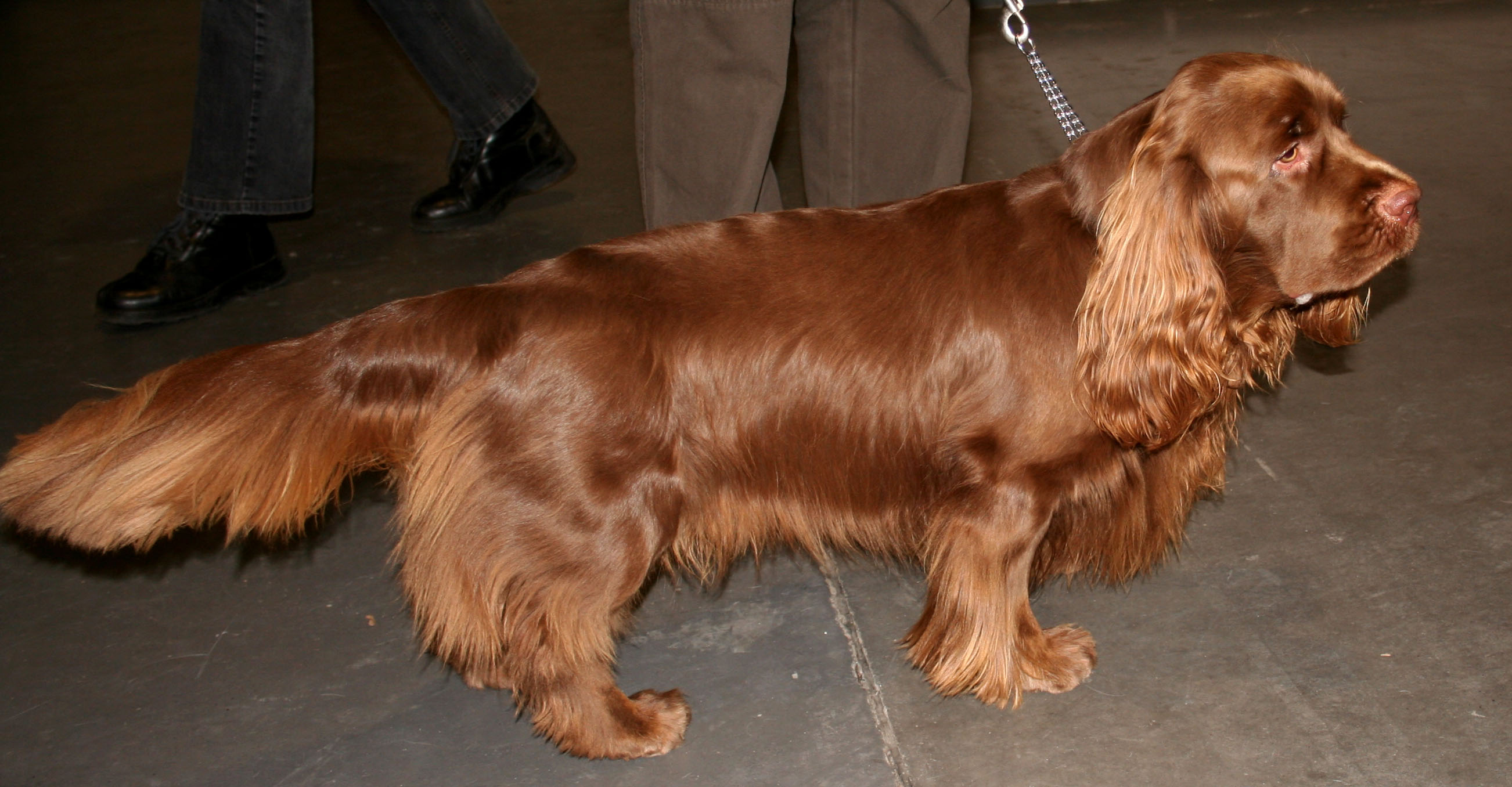
- A Sussex Spaniel with an undocked tail
- Common nicknames: Sussex
- Origin: England
Traits
- Height: 15–16 in (38–41 cm) at the withers
- Weight: 45–50 lb (20–23 kg)
Kennel club standards
- The Kennel Club: standard
- Fédération Cynologique Internationale: standard

The Sussex Spaniel is a breed of dog native to Sussex, in southern England. It is a low, compact spaniel and is similar in appearance to the Clumber Spaniel. The Sussex Spaniel is a slow-paced, calm breed. They can suffer from various health conditions such as spinal disc herniation and a specific range of heart conditions.

The Sussex Spaniel was first recorded in 1795 in East and West Sussex, being at Goodwood and Rolvenden for specific hunting conditions. The breed was one of the first to be recognised by the UK Kennel Club in 1872 and was among the first breeds eligible for registration by the American Kennel Club. The breed nearly became extinct during the Second World War, but was bred back to sustainable numbers. It is now more popular in the United Kingdom and the United States than in any other country and is recognised by all major kennel clubs. Sussex Spaniel Stump won the best in show in 2009 at the 133rd Westminster Kennel Club.

== Description ==
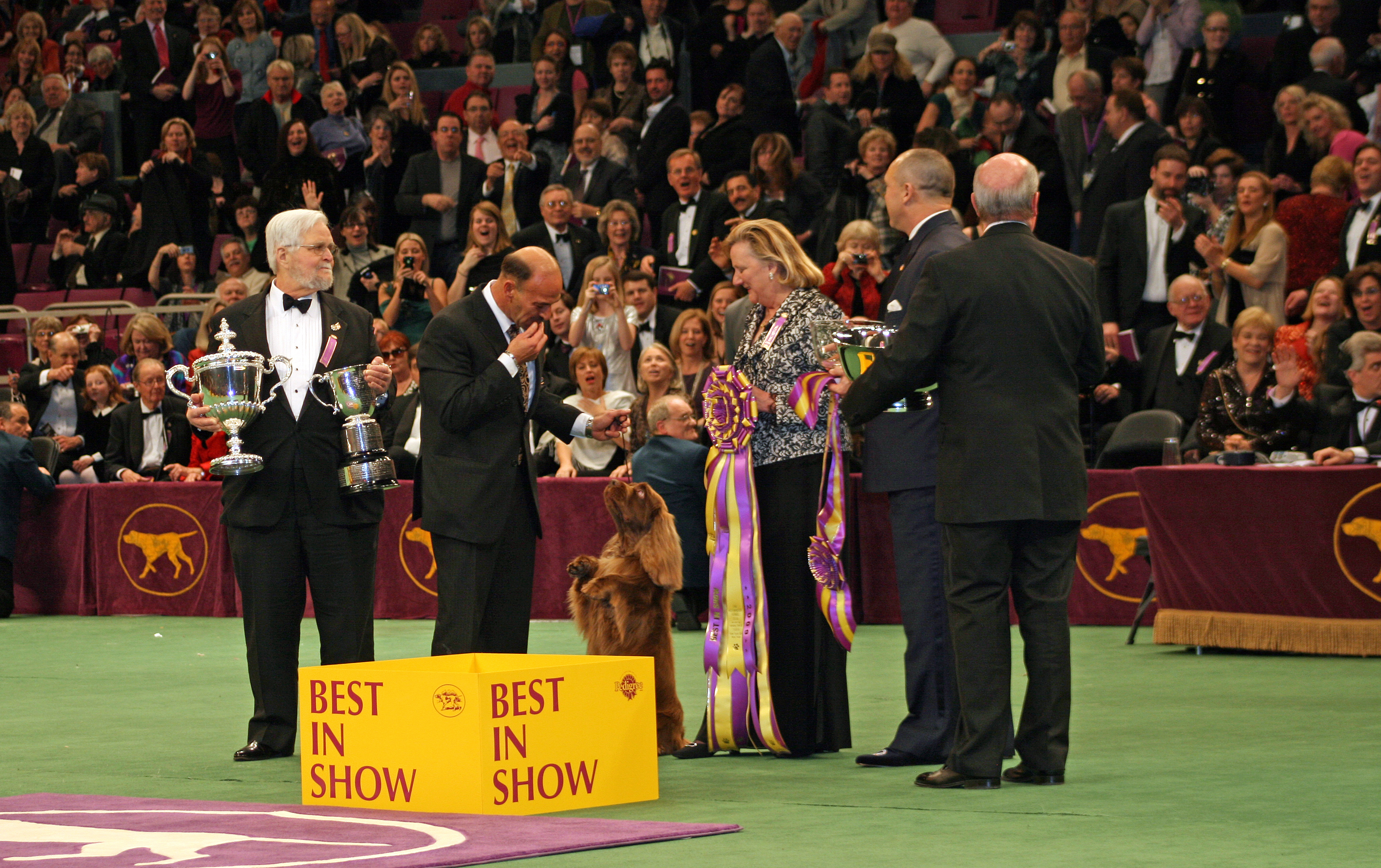
A Sussex Spaniel winning best in show at the 2009 Westminster Kennel Club show

The Sussex Spaniel is a low, compact spaniel similar in appearance, but not in colour, to a Clumber Spaniel. It is normally no taller than 15–16 in (38–41 cm) at the withers, and the usual weight range is 45–50 lb (20–23 kg) with a roughly rectangular appearance. The Clumber Spaniel on the other hand is normally between 17–20 in (43–51 cm) high at the shoulder and weighs 55–85 lb (25–39 kg).

One of the noticeable features is their golden liver-coloured coat, which is unique to the breed. Historically, however, there have also been examples of black, black and tan and golden liver and white coloured Sussex Spaniels. coat is thick (sometimes with a slight wave to it), feathering on the chest, legs and ears and consists of a weather-resistant undercoat with a silky outer coat. The eyes are hazel in colour. The long silky ears are lobe-shaped, typical of the Spaniel, and set moderately low.

== Temperament ==
The Sussex Spaniel is a slow-paced, calm breed with somewhat clownish behaviour that normally keeps its energy and enthusiasm in check. They are eager to be around people, excellent around children, and can be quite protective of the family. They make excellent candidates for therapy dog work. Most Sussex Spaniels are primarily family pets, but they are competent enough to aid a hunter, though quite stubborn to train. They tend to have a natural ability to quarter in the field and can be used to retrieve, given training. The breed is the only spaniel to howl once a game's scent is picked up.

== Health ==
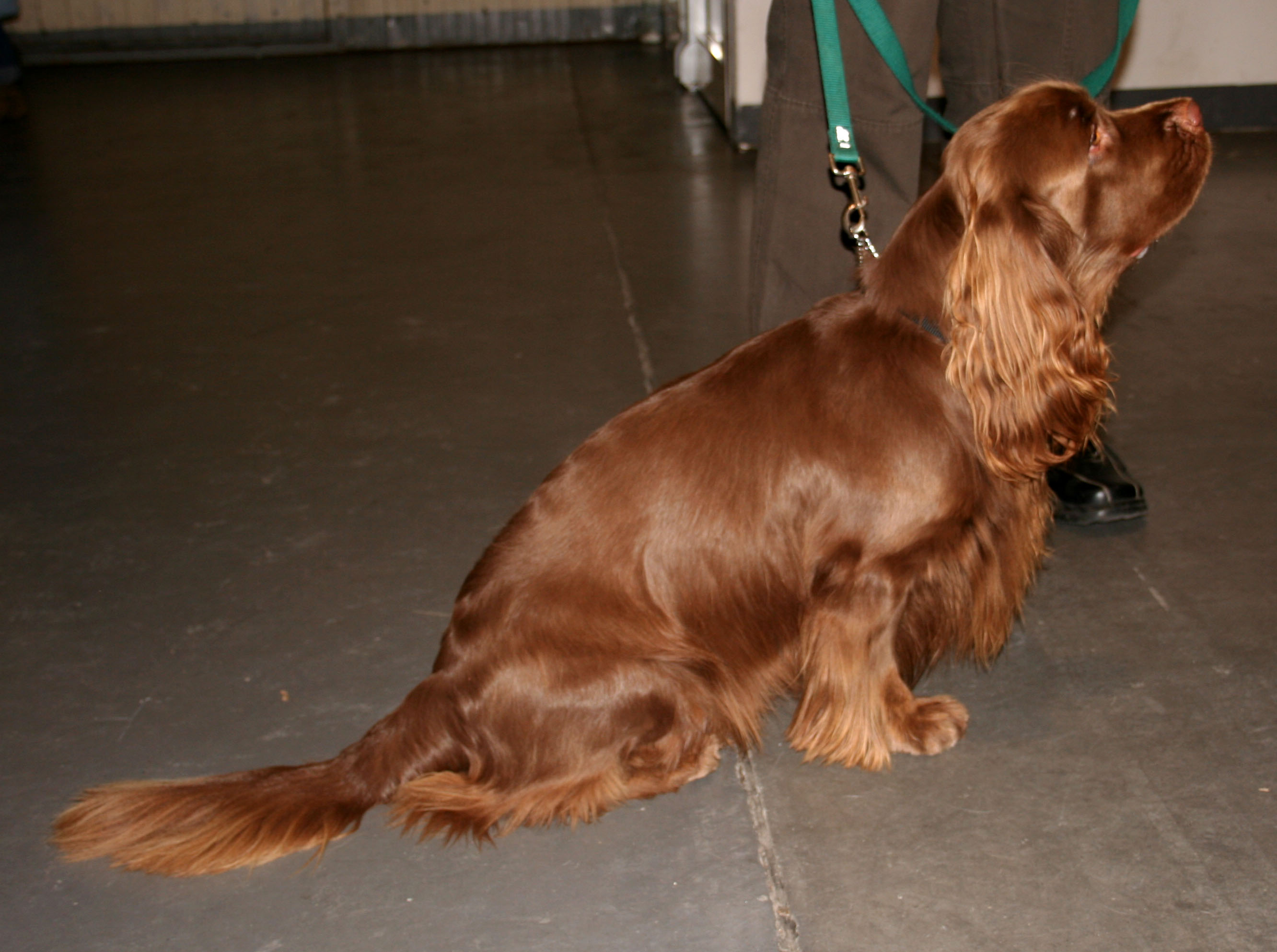
Sussex Spaniel

Hip dysplasia, a genetic malformation of the hip joint, may be a concern, but because of the breed's compact nature is not often seriously debilitating. Surveys conducted by the Orthopaedic Foundation For Animals showed that 41.5% of Sussex Spaniels were affected by hip dysplasia, and the breed was ranked 9th worst affected out of 157 breeds.

Another common condition is otitis externa (outer ear infections), which is common to a variety of spaniels, as the long floppy ears trap moisture, making them more prone to recurrent infections than dogs with more upright ears. The infections can be caused by a variety of reasons, including mites, ear fungi and generally dirt and germs. Treatment is relatively simple and can range from prescribed antibiotics to over-the-counter ear cleaning liquids.

Whelping sometimes presents difficulties and requires caesarean section for successful delivery of the puppies. The Sussex Spaniel is considered difficult to breed.

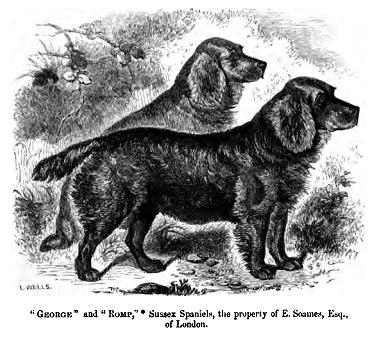
A drawing of two Sussex Spaniels from 1859

Heart conditions in the Sussex Spaniel can include pulmonary valve stenosis, which is the most common of the congenital heart defects. Essentially, in an animal with this condition, the pulmonary valve is improperly formed, which causes the heart to work much faster to pump blood around the body. The final results of this condition can be swelling of fluid in the chambers of the heart, thickening of the heart muscle known as ventricular hypertrophy, leading to eventual heart failure.

Patent ductus arteriosus also appears in the breed. It is a condition where a small blood vessel connecting two major arteries does not close following birth. It can cause complications as it is positioned to allow the blood flow to bypass the lungs. It also appears in American Staffordshire Terriers.

A heart condition uncommon to the breed is tetralogy of Fallot, which is relatively more common in the Keeshond and English Bulldog breeds. It is a combination of up to four conditions, including the previously mentioned pulmonary valve stenosis, with a secondary condition of right ventricular hypertrophy. The other conditions are a ventricular septal defect, which is a defect or hole in the wall of the heart between the two ventricles, and the aorta, which carries the blood from the left to the right side of the heart, can be mis-positioned. The effect on the dog depends on the severity of the condition, and can range from a heart murmur to reduced activity levels to death. Symptoms in puppies are generally a failure to grow and a reduced tolerance for exercise. Active treatment is effective in around 50% of cases.

=== Intervertebral disc syndrome ===
Also commonly called spinal disc herniation, this is where the intervertebral disc bulges or ruptures into the vertebral canal where the spinal cord resides. When the cord is compressed, the dog can experience symptoms ranging in scope from mild back or neck pain to paralysis of limbs, loss of sensation, and loss of bladder or bowel control. It is most commonly seen in the mid-back area, but can occur anywhere along the spine. Mild cases that do not result in paralysis can be treated medically by confining the animal in a crate to restrict movement to a minimum for several weeks, which can be accompanied by pain medication. Surgery can restore sensation to a dog's legs following paralysis, but the success rate depends on how severe the herniation was.

== History ==
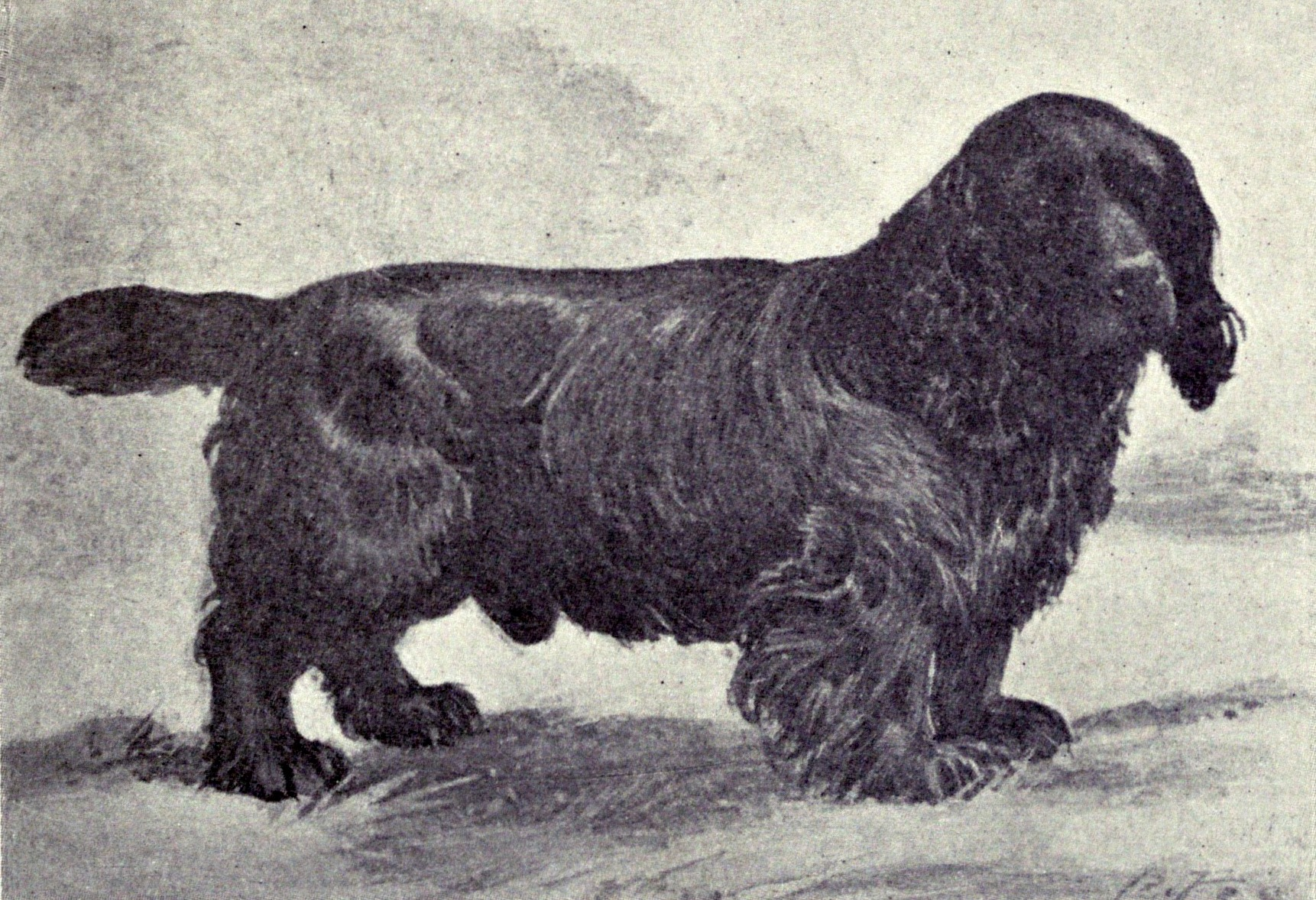
Sussex Spaniel circa 1915

The Sussex is a native breed to the county, known to be bred at Goodwood, West Sussex in 1792 and by Augustus Elliot Fuller of Rose Hill (now known as Brightling Park, Brightling in East Sussex, England). The Sussex is a breed of gun dog able to work in districts where the terrain is rough and the undergrowth very dense, where a spaniel was needed which could give tongue or to alert the hunter on his quarry. The Sussex as a breed is older than the liver and white Norfolk Spaniel (now extinct), the Field Spaniel, and the English Springer Spaniels. The Sussex was bred specifically to inherit the barking ability (giving tongue) that was not common in most Spaniel breeds.

The Sussex Spaniel was one of the first to be registered by the UK Kennel club when it formed in 1872 and was one of the first ten breeds admitted into the stud book by the American Kennel Club in 1884, but lost what little popularity it had achieved in the 1940s. During World War II, breeding was discouraged but the Sussex were saved from extinction by English breeder Joy Freer. All modern Sussex Spaniels are descended from the dogs she saved. In 1947, only ten Sussex Spaniels were registered in the English Kennel Club.

In 2004 the breed was identified as a vulnerable native breed by the Kennel Club of Great Britain, which are described as having annual registration figures of less than 300 per year. In 2008, only 56 puppies were registered.

In 2009, a Sussex Spaniel named "Clussexx Three D Grinchy Glee," call name "Stump," won best in show at the 133rd Westminster Kennel Club Dog Show. At 10 years old, Stump became the oldest dog to win this title.

The breed is more popular in the United Kingdom and the United States than in any other countries. It is recognised by the Continental Kennel Club, Fédération Cynologique Internationale, American Kennel Club, Kennel Club of Great Britain, Canadian Kennel Club, National Kennel Club, New Zealand Kennel Club, and the American Canine Registry.
