= Special Times Just Right =

Bichon Frise, won the 2001 Westminster Kennel Club Dog Show

Special Times' Just Right (12 November 1997 – 19 September 2012), commonly called J.R., was a Bichon Frise, who most notably won the 2001 Westminster Dog Show Best In Show. He was the top winning bichon in breed history.

J.R.'s total of 101 BIS wins was balanced by an equally impressive career as a stud. Within a year of retirement he confirmed his quality by siring 20 champions, becoming the top Bichon sire for 2002 and 2003. He eventually sired over 60 champions.

Upon announcement of winning the Westminster Best In Show, J.R. noticeably spun around and leaped in the air in excitement, and was famous for his signature paw wave.

J.R.'s owner, Eleanor McDonald, took J.R.'s name from one of her favorite charities, the Special Times children's cancer program. She also thought that her little pup looked just right, and her opinion that was dramatically confirmed by the Westminster BIS judge Dorothy Macdonald who was widely quoted describing J.R “as close to perfection as you can get.
