= Clumber Spaniel =

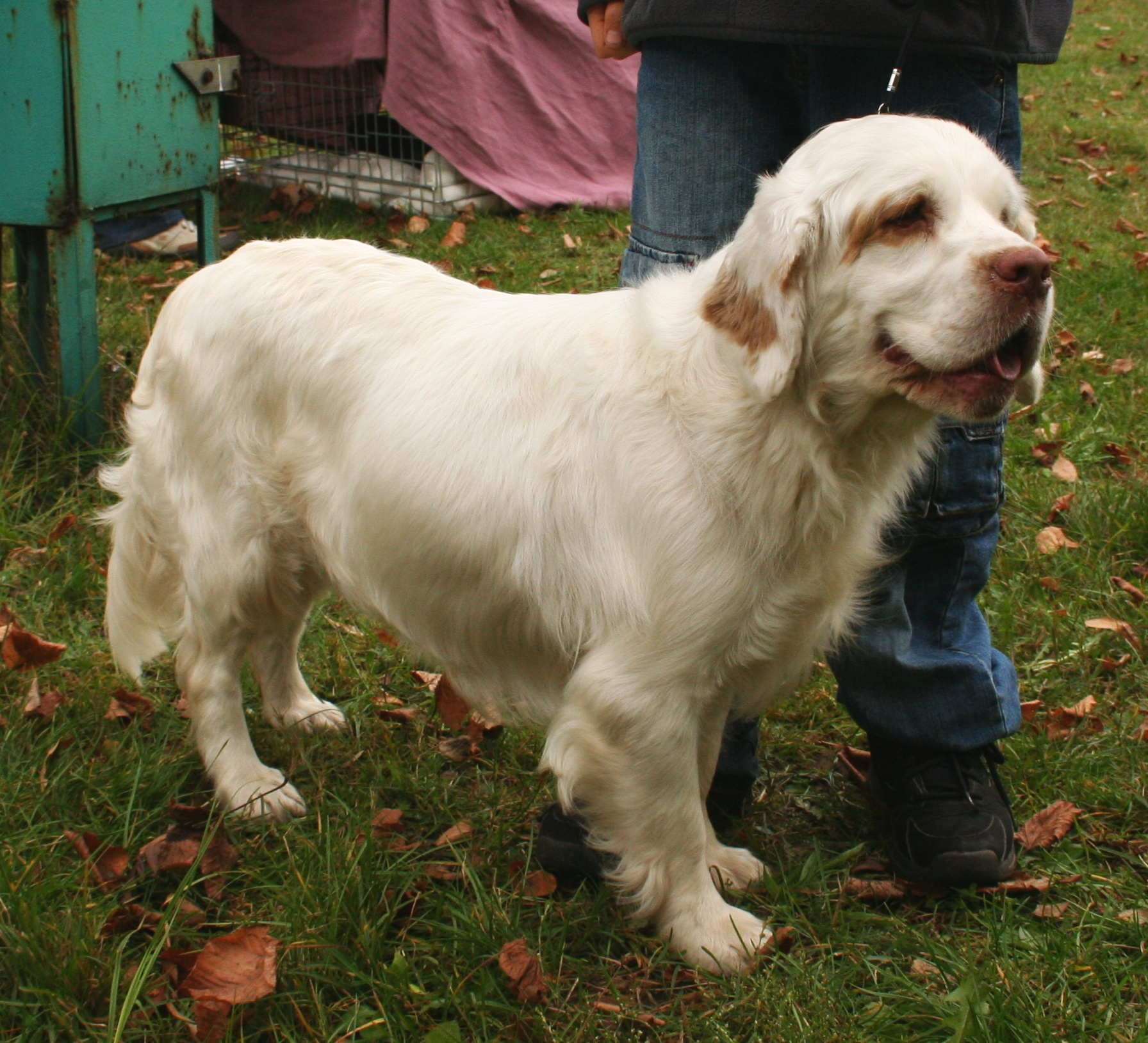
- A Clumber Spaniel
- Origin: England
Kennel club standards
- The Kennel Club: standard
- Fédération Cynologique Internationale: standard

The Clumber Spaniel is a breed of dog of the spaniel type, developed in the United Kingdom. It is the largest of the spaniels, and comes in predominantly white with either lemon or orange markings. The name of the breed is taken from Clumber Park in Nottinghamshire where the breed was first developed. It is a gundog that specialises in hunting in heavy cover. They are gentle and loyal, and can act aloof with strangers.

The history of the breed is uncertain prior to the mid-19th century with two theories being prevalent. Clumber Spaniels have been kept and bred by various members of the British Royal Family, including Prince Albert, King Edward VII and King George V. They were introduced into Canada in 1844, and in 1884 became one of the first ten breeds recognised by the American Kennel Club. The breed can suffer from a variety of breed-specific ailments varying in severity from temporary lameness due to bone growth whilst young to hip dysplasia or spinal disc herniation.

== Description ==
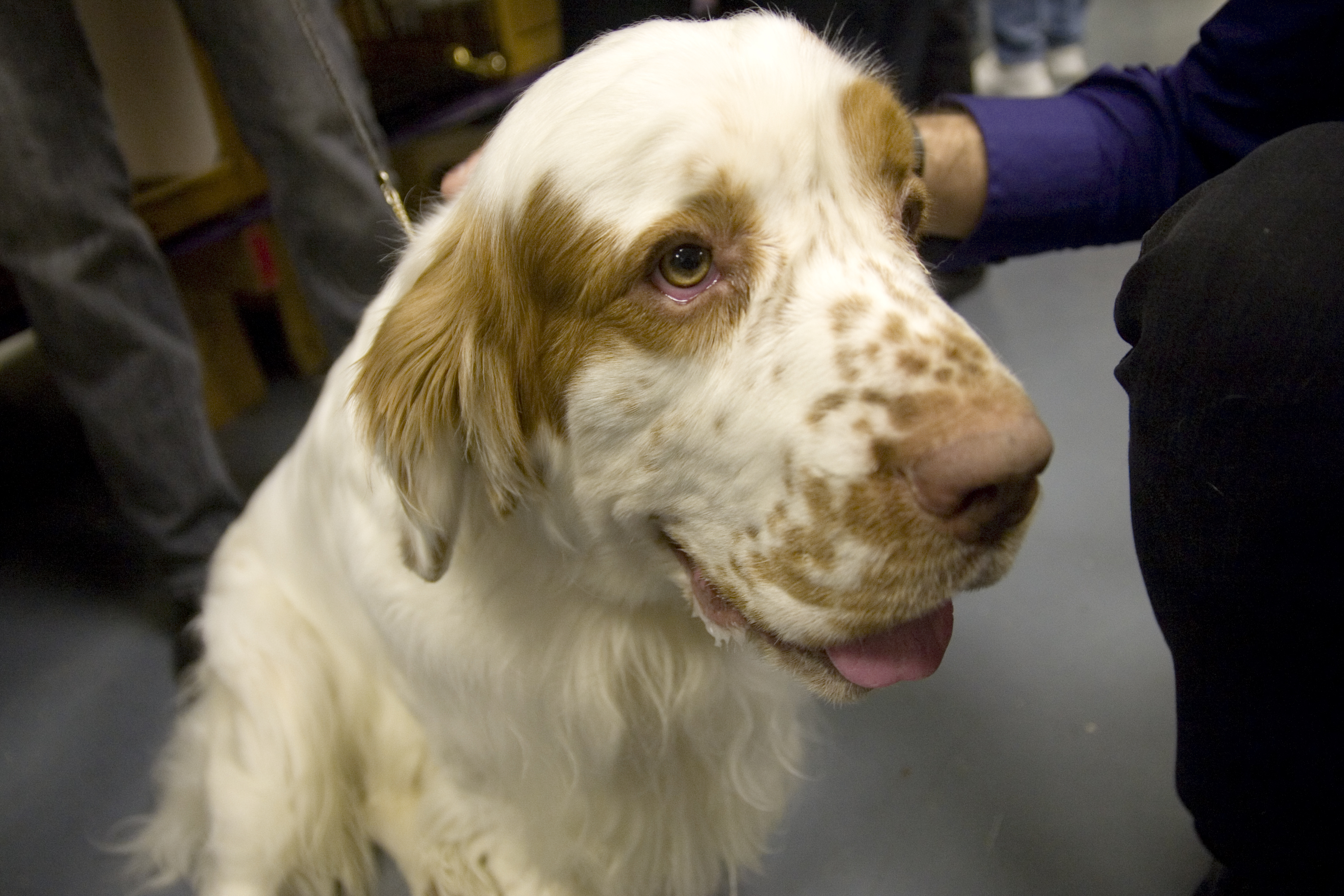
A head-shot of a Clumber Spaniel showing the coloured markings around the eyes and muzzle.

=== Appearance ===
The Clumber Spaniel is the largest of the English spaniel breeds, and is long and heavy-bodied, standing only 17 to 20 inches (43 to 51 cm) in height but weighing from 55 to 85 pounds (25 to 39 kg). It is similar in shape to the smaller Sussex Spaniel. The Clumber has a heavy bone structure, has a massive 'melting' head with a mournful and dopey expression, a square nose and muzzle, and large vine-leaf shaped ears. Freckles on the muzzle and front legs are common. Its coat is dense, weather-resistant, straight, and flat with feathering around the ears, belly and legs. Clumbers are predominantly white in colour with lemon, brown, or orange markings around the eyes, and at the base of the tail.

=== Temperament ===
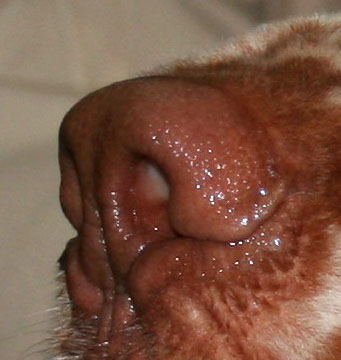
The powerful nose of the Clumber Spaniel.

Their temperament is described as gentle, loyal and affectionate, but dignified and aloof with strangers. They can appear to be a sedate breed and enjoy curling up on the couch, eating and sleeping.

Clumber Spaniels shed at a medium pace and need to be brushed and groomed frequently. Clumbers tend to drool because of their very droopy flews. Clumbers have minds of their own. Puppies are especially curious and playful. The breed has a trophy mentality and the dog has an incessant need to carry something most of the time; unfortunately this can lead to health issues as they may ingest the items. Clumber Spaniels have a tendency to be more reserved with other dogs until they have warmed up to them.

The breed has been used to hunt pheasant and partridge, in both small packs and alone. It is well suited for work in upland hunting in dense cover, and although the Clumber is rather slow in the field compared with other spaniels it is a quiet worker with a fine nose and good stamina. The broad muzzle of the breed allows it to retrieve a variety of game. Clumber Spaniels can be very content indoors or out, but they seem most pleased to be wherever their owner is. Clumber Spaniels do not have a tendency to bark frequently and are considered more as companions in the home than as a watch dog.

== Health ==
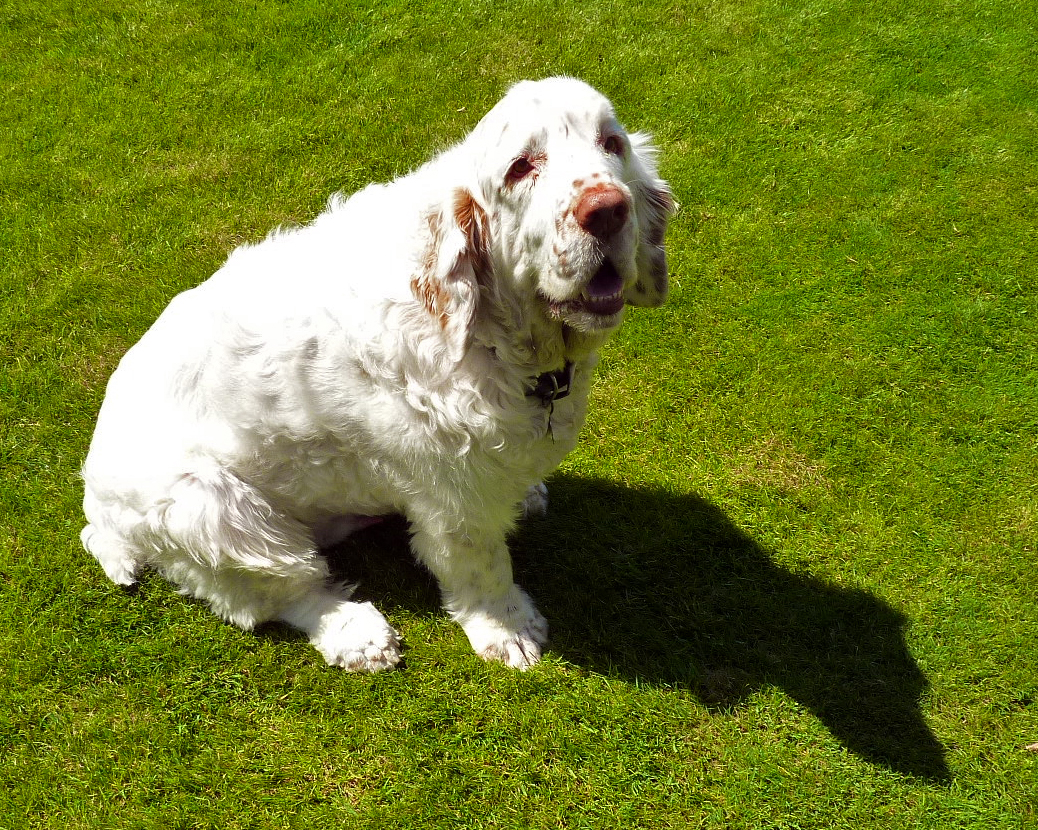
Clumber Spaniels can suffer from heat sensitivity.

Because Clumber Spaniels are large boned and fast growing, they can suffer from temporary lameness from between six and twelve months of age, with this lameness subsiding when bone growth is complete. Another common condition that the breed suffers from are impacted anal sacs and the dog may require them to be emptied by a veterinarian. The final common condition that the breed has is heat sensitivity: if Clumber Spaniels are left without shade, they can become uncomfortably hot and dehydrated.

In addition, Clumbers often have difficulties conceiving and giving birth, and may require caesarian sections. Some dogs may suffer from sensitivity to anaesthesia. The most common severe health conditions in the Clumber Spaniel are entropion/ectropion eye conditions, spinal disc herniation and hip dysplasia. A 2024 UK study found a life expectancy of 12.3 years for the breed compared to an average of 12.7 for purebreeds and 12 for crossbreeds.

=== Entropion/Ectropion ===
Entropion is the inward rolling of the eyelid, commonly the lower lid. This in turn irritates the cornea of the eye and can cause visual impairment. It is a hereditary disorder seen in both English and American Cocker Spaniels, King Charles Spaniels, English Springer Spaniels plus a variety of non spaniel breeds.

Ectropion is the outward rolling of the eyelid, which abnormally exposes the eye, resulting in irritation. Because of the increased exposure, the dog can develop allergic or bacterial conjunctivitis or keratoconjunctivitis sicca also known as dry-eye syndrome. It is most commonly found in breeds with exaggerated facial features such as the Boxer, Bloodhound, Gordon Setter as well as the English and American Cocker Spaniels, and the English Springer Spaniel.

The treatment for ectropion varies depending on the severity of the condition. The only treatment for entropion is surgical, and may be delayed until the dog reaches adulthood as whilst a puppy the facial structures of the animal are still growing and changing. Dogs who have surgical correction for defects such as entropion or ectropion may not be exhibited in the show ring.

=== Spinal disc herniation ===
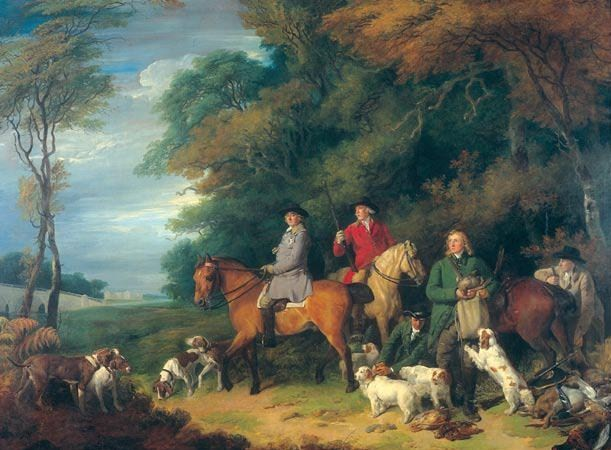
"The Return From Shooting" (1788) by Sir Francis Wheatley depicting The Duke of Newcastle, his friend Colonel Litchfield and the Duke's gamekeeper, Mansell, along with four Clumber Spaniels.

Spinal disc herniation occurs when the Intervertebral disc bulges or ruptures into the vertebral canal where the spinal cord resides. Once the cord is compressed, the dog experiences symptoms ranging from mild back/neck pain to leg paralysis, loss of sensation, and urinary and fecal incontinence. The most commonly location seen is the mid-back area, but it may occur anywhere along the spine. Cases that do not result in paralysis can be treated medically by confining the animal to restrict movement to a minimum for several weeks, and this can be accompanied by medication for the pain. Surgery can restore sensation to a dog's legs following paralysis but the success rate depends on how severe the herniation was.

=== Hip dysplasia ===
Hip dysplasia is a hereditary condition which occurs in most dog breeds to some extent, according to scores from a 2001 UK Kennel Club scheme, the Clumber Spaniel has the second worst breed mean scores. Furthermore, a survey conducted by the Orthopedic Foundation for Animals found that 45.7% of Clumber Spaniels tested were affected by the condition. Initial signs are usually first noted when the dog is between five and twelve months old, and may include a swaying hindleg gait, hindleg lameness, muscle wastage around the hindquarters, reluctance to and fatigue during exercise, inability to climb stairs or jump up. The dog can appear hunched up with an arched back, and in the very worst cases may wince with pain when moving its hindlegs. Medical treatment can vary from the administration of painkillers to surgical correction depending on the severity of the condition.

== History ==
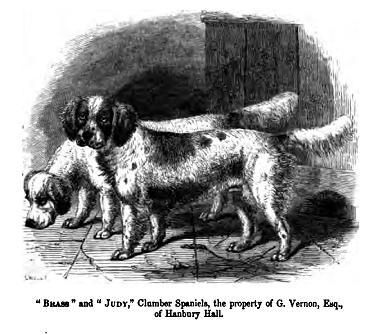
A drawing of two Clumber Spaniels from 1858.

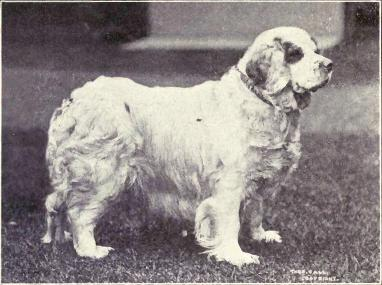
A Clumber Spaniel from 1915.

The breed's history is uncertain before the middle of the 19th century. One theory is that it originated in France, stating that the Duc de Noailles at the time of the French Revolution gave his kennel of prized spaniels to the Duke of Newcastle at Clumber Park in Nottinghamshire. The theory goes, that the now extinct Alpine Spaniel was bred with Basset Hounds, and the Pyrenean Mountain Dog also known as the Great Pyrenees. A second theory is that it is descended from the old type of Bleinheim Spaniel, which was later to be incorporated into the King Charles breed of Spaniel.

What is certain is that the breed took its name from Clumber Park and that the Duke of Newcastle's gamekeeper, William Mansell, is credited with their development and improvement. Prince Albert, the Prince consort of Queen Victoria, was a fancier and promoter of the breed, as was his son King Edward VII, who bred them at the Sandringham estate in Norfolk. The breed was shown in England from 1859 onward. They are referred to in Queen Victoria's diary: on October 16, 1840, she wrote, "Walked out directly after breakfast before Albert went to shoot. He had his 7 fine Clumber Spaniels with us and we went into the Slopes, with such a funny old Gamekeeper, Walters, in order that I should see how the dogs found out their game. They are such dear, nice dogs."

Until the mid 19th century the breeding of the Clumber Spaniel was mostly restricted to the nobility. During World War I breeding was stopped entirely causing their numbers to decrease to a record low. In 1925, King George V re-developed a line of Clumbers in the Royal Kennel and were used in the fields in the Sandringham Estate.

Sh. Ch. Raycroft Socialite, bred by Rae Furness and owned by Ralph Dunne of County Cavan, Ireland, won the coveted honor of Best In Show at the 1991 Crufts Centenary Show.

The Clumber Spaniel is currently recognised as a Vulnerable Native Breed by the UK Kennel Club, which means it is a breed with fewer than 300 new registrations each year. Other spaniels recognised as such are the Field Spaniel, Irish Water Spaniel and Sussex Spaniel.

A Clumber spaniel named "Bruin" (Sh Ch Vanitonia Soloist) was crowned best in show at Crufts 2026.

=== Clumber Spaniels in North America ===
While the breed was not shown widely in the United States prior to the late 1960s, in 1844, Lieutenant Venables, an officer of the British regiment stationed in Halifax, Nova Scotia, introduced the Clumber Spaniel to North America. The first Clumber Spaniel listed in the AKC registry, recorded for the date of 1878 was Bustler, an orange and white dog owned by Benjamin Smith of Nova Scotia. The Clumber Spaniel became one of the first ten breeds recognised by the American Kennel Club in 1884.

The first Clumber Spaniel was entered in the Westminster Kennel Club Dog Show in 1878. Champion Clussexx Country Sunrise (Brady), bred by Doug Johnson and owned by Richard and Judith Zaleski of Florida, became the only Clumber to win Best in Show there in 1996. Samantha, now a six-year-old retired competitor, was placed 1st in her category for Clumber Spaniels and competed within Kaston Kennels, home of the World Famous Vanitonia Show Kennel. She now resides in Lake Forest Il.
