= English Springer Spaniel =

Breed of gun dog

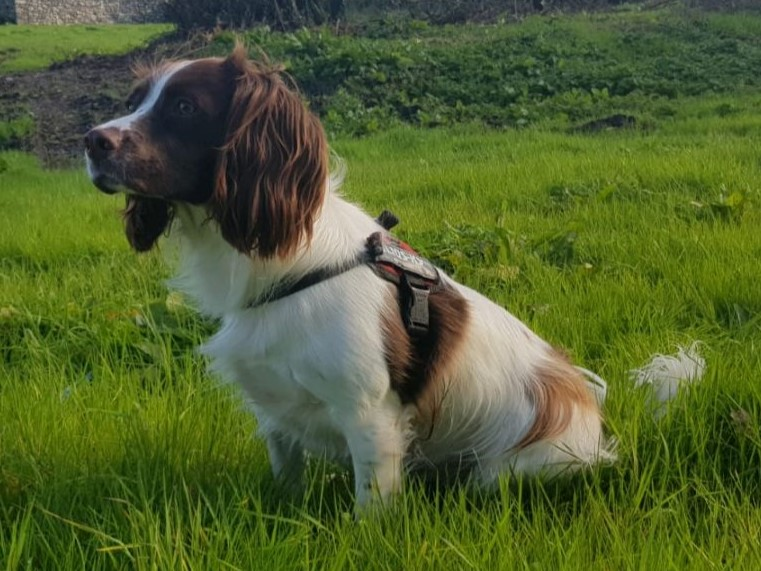
- A field-bred English Springer Spaniel
- Other names: Springer Spaniel
- Origin: England
Kennel club standards
- The Kennel Club: standard
- Fédération Cynologique Internationale: standard

The English Springer Spaniel is a breed of gun dog in the Spaniel group traditionally used for flushing and retrieving game. They are descended from the Norfolk or Shropshire Spaniels of the mid-19th century; the breed has diverged into separate show and working lines. It is closely related to the Welsh Springer Spaniel and very closely to the English Cocker Spaniel; less than a century ago, springers and cockers would come from the same litter. The smaller "cockers" were used in woodcock hunting while their larger littermates were used to flush, or "spring", other game birds. In 1902, The Kennel Club recognized the English Springer Spaniel as a distinct breed. They are used as sniffer dogs on a widespread basis.

== Description ==
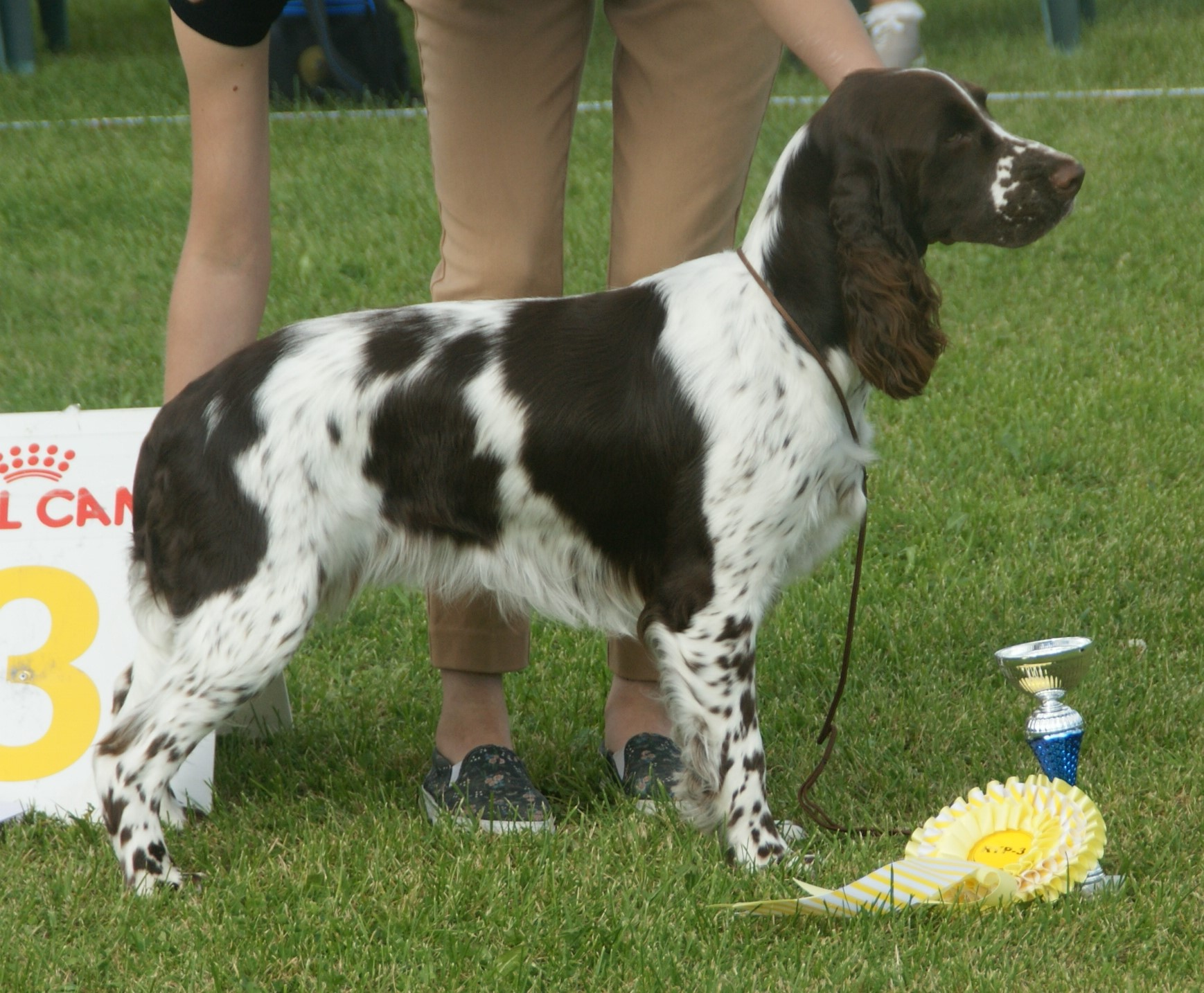
A show-bred English Springer Spaniel

The English Springer Spaniel is a medium-sized compact dog. Its coat is moderately long with feathering on the legs and tail. It is a well proportioned, balanced dog with a gentle expression. This breed represents perhaps the greatest divergence between working and show lines of any breed of dog. A field-bred dog and a show-bred dog appear to be different breeds but are registered together. The gene pools are almost completely segregated and have been for at least 70 years. A field-bred dog would not be competitive in a modern dog show, while a show dog would not have the speed or stamina to succeed in a field trial.

The English Springer Spaniel field-bred dogs tend to have shorter, coarser coats than show-bred dogs. The ears are less pendulous. Field-bred dogs are wiry and have more of a feral look than those bred for showing. The tail of the field-bred dog may be docked a few inches in comparison to the show dog. Field-bred dogs are selected for their sense of smell, hunting ability, and response to training rather than appearance.

Show dogs have longer fur and more pendant ears, dewlaps and dangling flews. The tail is docked to a short stub in those countries that permit docking. They are generally more thickly boned and heavier than field-bred springers.

The English Springer Spaniel is similar to the English Cocker Spaniel and at first glance, the only major difference is the latter's smaller size. However English Springers also tend to have shorter, and higher-set ears than English Cockers. Springers also tend to have a longer muzzle; their eyes are not as prominent, and the coat is less abundant.

=== Coat and colors ===
Field-bred dogs tend to have shorter, coarser coats than the longer furred show-bred dogs. They normally only shed in summer and spring months but shed occasionally in the autumn. The coat may come in black or liver (dark brown) with white markings or predominantly white with black or liver markings; blue or liver roan; or tricolour consisting of black and white or liver and white with tan markings, usually found on eyebrows, cheeks, inside of ears and under the tail. Any white portion of the coat may be flecked with ticking.

=== Sizes ===
Males in the show dog line are typically approximately 19 to 21 inches (48 to 53 cm) at the withers and weigh 40 to 60 lb (18 to 27 kg). According to the UK Breed Standard, the English Springer Spaniel should be 20 inches (51 cm) at the withers. The females should be 18 to 20 inches (46 to 51 cm) and usually 35 to 55 lb (16 to 25 kg). Working types can be lighter in weight and finer in bone.

== Health ==
A 2022 UK study found a life expectancy of 11.92 years for the breed, above the average of 11.23 years. A 2024 UK study found a life expectancy of 13.5 years for the breed compared to an average of 12.7 for purebreeds and 12 for crossbreeds. A 2005 Swedish study found 29% of Springer Spaniels died by the age of 10, less than the overall rate of 35% of dogs dying by the age of 10.

Skin conditions the breed is predisposed to include: acral mutilation syndrome, intertrigo, lichenoid psoriasis–form dermatitis, Malassezia dermatitis, otitis externa, and primary seborrhoea.

An American study reviewing over a million cases presented to 27 veterinary teaching hospitals in North America found the English Springer Spaniel to be predisposed to canine hip dysplasia, with 4.39% of dogs having the condition compared to 3.52% overall. A survey of UK breed club members found cancer to be the most common cause of death at 26.7% of deaths.

English Springer Spaniels have a predisposition to chronic hepatitis. The form of chronic hepatitis in the breed is more severe, affects younger dogs, and is more likely to affect bitches. One study found the English Springer Spaniel to be 6.3 times more likely to acquire the disease. Another study found an odds ratio of 5.3.

== History ==
The English physician John Caius described the spaniel in his book the Treatise of Englishe Dogs published in 1576. His book was the first work to describe the various British breeds by function. By 1801, Sydenham Edwards explained in the Cynographia Britannica that the land spaniel should be split into two kinds, the Springing, Hawking Spaniel, or Starter; and the Cocking or Cocker Spaniel.

At this point, both cocker spaniels and springer spaniels were born in the same litters. The purpose of the breed was to serve as a hunting dog. The smaller cockers were used to hunt woodcock, while their larger littermates, the springer spaniels, would "spring"—or flush—the gamebird into the air where a trained falcon or hawk would bring it to the handler.

Many spaniel breeds were developed during the 19th century, and often named after the counties in which they were developed, or after their owners, who were usually nobility. Two strains of larger land spaniel were predominant and were said to have been of "true springer type." These were the Norfolk and the Shropshire spaniels, and by the 1850s, these were shown under the breed name of Norfolk spaniel.

In January 1899, the Spaniel Club of England and the Sporting Spaniel Society held their trials together for the first time. Three years later, in 1902, a combination of the physical standard from the Spaniel Club of England and the ability standard from the Sporting Spaniel Society led to the English Springer Spaniel breed being officially recognized by the English Kennel Club. The American Kennel Club followed in 1910. In 1914, the first English Field Champion was crowned, FTC Rivington Sam, whose dam was a registered cocker spaniel, Rivington Riband. Sam is considered one of the foundation sires for modern field lines.

== Detection dog ==
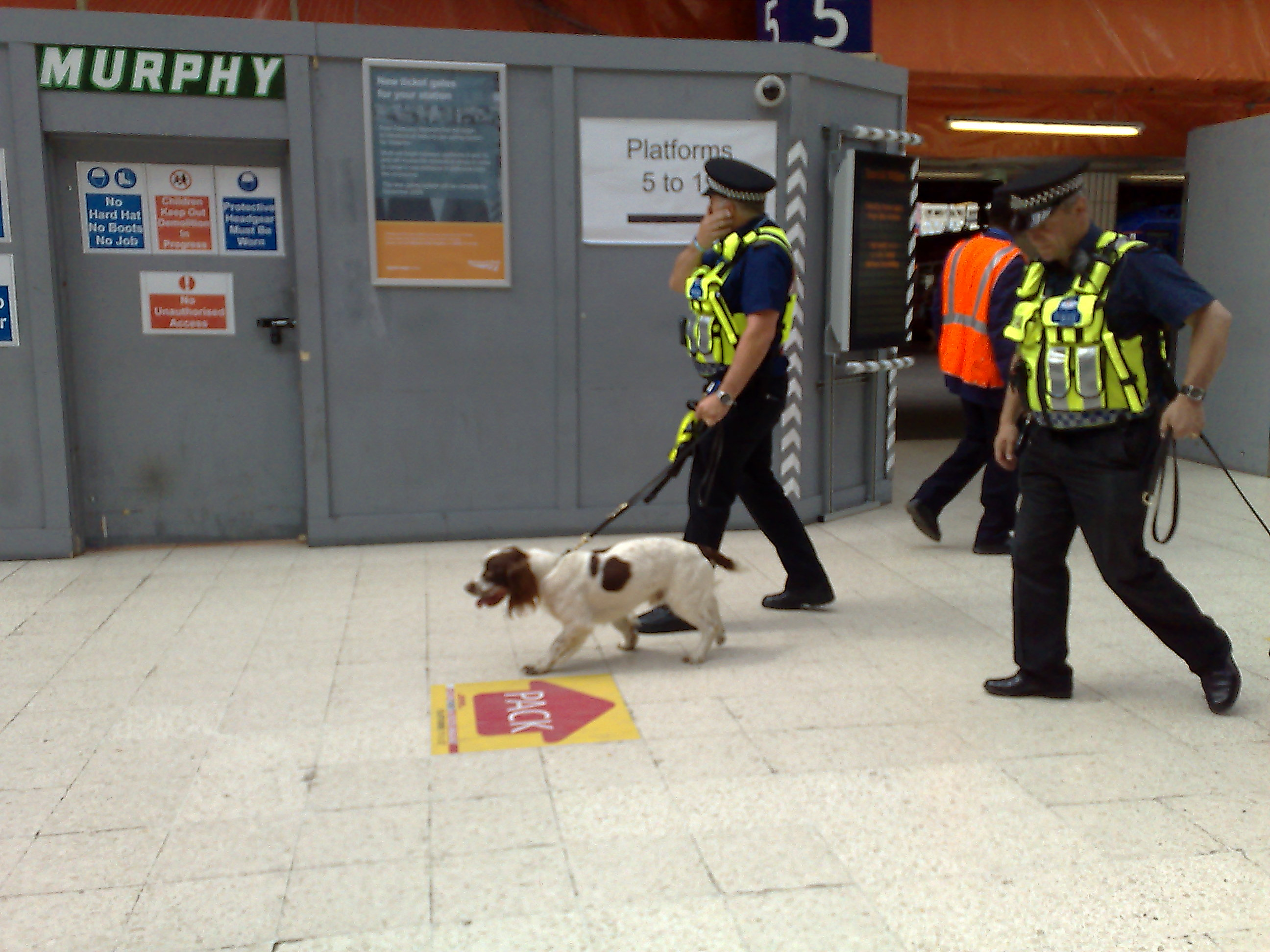
Police officers with a sniffer dog at London Waterloo railway station

The Springer Spaniel is used as a sniffer dog. Notable search dogs have included Buster, a Dickin Medal recipient, Royal Army Veterinary Corps arms and explosives search dog serving with the Duke of Wellington's Regiment in Iraq, for finding an extremist group's hidden arsenal of weapons and explosives. Another example is Jake, aka Hubble Keck People's Dispensary for Sick Animals Gold Medal and Blue Cross Animal Hospital Medal recipient, a London Metropolitan Police explosives search dog. He was deployed at Tavistock Square, Russell Square and King's Cross following the 7 July 2005 London bombings.

The Springer is not limited to detecting explosives. Other varied uses for the Springer can include sniffing out bumblebee nests, illegal immigrants, blood and the superbug C. difficile. Springers are used for drug detection in the United States, United Kingdom, Sweden, Finland, Isle of Man, Ireland, Canada CBSA and Qatar.

The Springer Spaniel is also used as a search and rescue dog by mountain rescue and Lowland Rescue teams, where their willingness to work and cover rough terrain makes them an excellent choice.

== Notable English Springer Spaniels ==
Awarded the Dickin Medal for conspicuous gallantry or devotion to duty while serving in military conflict:

- Theo
- Buster

Awarded the PDSA Gold Medal for animal bravery:

- Ghillie

Awarded the PDSA Order of Merit

- Max

US Presidential Dog

- Millie
- Spot Fetcher

== See also ==
- List of dog breeds
- Hunting dog
- Sporting Group
- Cocker Spaniel
- Mountain Rescue
