= Rancho Dobe's Storm =

Champion show dog (1949–1960)

Ch. Rancho Dobe's Storm
- Ch. Rancho Dobe's Storm, photographed before the 1953 Westminster Kennel Club Dog Show
- Other names: Storm, Stormie
- Species: Canis lupus familiaris
- Breed: Doberman Pinscher
- Sex: Male
- Born: December 12, 1949; Van Nuys, California
- Died: October 1960
- Title: 2x Best In Show at the Westminster Dog Show
- Term: 1952–1953
- Predecessor: Ch. Bang Away of Sirrah Crest (Boxer)
- Successor: Ch. Carmor's Rise and Shine (American Cocker Spaniel)
- Owner: Len Carey
- Parent: Ferry v. Rauhfelsen of Giralda (grandfather)
- Offspring: Ch. Storm's Donner
- Weight: 92 lb (42 kg)

Ch. Rancho Dobe's Storm (12 December 1949 – October 1960), also known as Storm or Stormie, a Doberman Pinscher, best known for being Best in Show at the Westminster Kennel Club Dog Show in both 1952 and 1953. He was the grandson of the 1939 champion, Ferry v. Rauhfelsen of Giralda. Born in California, he was sold to his New York–based owner Len Carey at the age of three months. At the age of sixteen months he won Best of Breed at his first adult dog show, something he would repeat in all 25 of the shows he was entered into, becoming undefeated in breed competition.

He became a popular sire, having sired over 300 puppies. Royal Doulton released a ceramic figurine of him, and the American Kennel Club inducted him in 1993 as one of only three conformation show dogs in the Hall of Fame at the Museum of the Dog in St. Louis, Missouri.

== Early life ==
Storm was born on 12 December, 1949, at the Ranch Dobe kennels in Van Nuys, California. He was one of thirteen puppies whelped by his mother, Champion Maedel von Randahof, who died shortly after giving birth. In addition to Storm, only three other puppies survived, Zephyr, Breeze and Gale – all females. The puppies great-grandsire was the 1939 Westminster Kennel Club Dog Show Best in Show winner, Ferry v. Rauhfelsen of Giralda, and Storm, in turn, was the 6x great-grandsire of 1989 Westminster Best In Show winner CH Royal Tudor's Wild as the Wind: UD TDX ROM CGC LC-12D. At the age of three months he was sold by his original owners, Mr and Mrs Brint Edwards to Len Carey, an advertising executive for Batten, Barton, Durstine & Osborn in New York. Carey had a standing order with the Edwards for the next male Doberman with conformation show potential.

Once in New York, Storm lived with Carey and his family in a 12th-floor apartment in Manhattan. Initially the dog had some difficulties with house training and using the elevators, but a strike by elevator workers in New York changed that. "Twelve floors down and twelve floors up, four times a day. It housebroke the dog and made a man of my son Jeff." recalled Carey later in an interview for Life magazine. At the age of four months while being walked in Central Park he slipped off his lead while being walked by Mrs Carey, and was seized by a police officer. Charged with permitting an animal to run at large, his owners were fined $1. The normal range of fines for such a charge were between $5 and $25. On another occasion, Storm was left sitting in a parked car with the window open slightly. Mrs Carey returned to the car to find a drunken man had shoved his fist through the gap in the window and was waving his hand around Storm's nose. The dog did not bite, and the entire drive home simply laid down and trembled.

The family moved out of the city in 1951 to Cos Cob, Connecticut, 30 miles (48 km) from New York. Storm shared the bed of Jeff Carey, Len's son, and ate eggs, biscuits and canned beef for his meals.

== Show history ==
Storm was entered into his first adult show at the age of sixteen months at the Yonkers Kennel Club. He was named Best of Breed for Dobermans, although was defeated in the Group round by a Boxer who went on to become Best in Show. He had only been trained for ten hours in conformation show handling and maneuvers.

More titles followed, during the course of his career he was entered in 25 dog shows and won Best of Breed in all of them. Furthermore, he won his Group round on 22 occasions and was named Best in Show seventeen times. Storm was never entered into competition at the Westchester Kennel Club Shows as his owner was a club official. Len Carey claims that Storm knew how he had performed by the photographers after the event, "He knows what a flashbulb is. He's a real ham." Although when a paper crown was placed on his head by a photographer, he knocked it to the floor, chewed on it and then buried it. At the Wilmington Kennel Club Dog Show on 28 April, 1951, he was named Best in Show, beating English Setter Ch. Sir Herbert Kennelworth into second place in front of a crowd of 2,000 people.

His thirteenth show was the Westminster Kennel Club Dog Show in 1952, held at Madison Square Garden in New York. It was thirteen years since the only previous Doberman had won the title of Best in Show at the event, and the unlucky number was compounded as Stormie was registered in the show catalogue as #13. During the Best in Show round, Storm stood dead still for thirteen minutes while judge Joseph P. Sims reviewed the other competitors, a Dachshund, a Poodle, a Brussels Griffon, a Welsh Terrier and an English Setter. Sims said of Storm, "The dog is a great showman and never lets up. I couldn't get away from him." Peter Knoop was Storm's handler during the event, it was the thirteenth occasion he had led a dog to Best in Show.

Storm was entered in the 1953 Westminster Kennel Club in order to attempt to retain the title. Only five dogs had previously retained the title over the course of the previous 76 years. He won the Best of Breed title once more, beating 65 other Dobermans in the process. He went on to win the Best in Show title for the second time.

== Legacy ==
Storm became a popular sire, having sired over 300 puppies by the time he competed at Westminster in 1954. Before his victory at the event in 1953, his stud fees were $100, which went up to $150 after the event. The Careys kept one of Storm's puppies, officially named Stormson, but known about the house as "Mo". In 1959, one of Storm's sons, named Storm's Donner, won Best in Show at the Westchester Kennel Club Dog Show, an event that Storm himself was never entered into. Donner was line bred to Storm, meaning that Storm was both the dog's father and grandfather.

His owner, Len Carey, would return to the Westminster show in 1964 and 1974, but this time as the Best in Show judge. He chose the Whippet Ch. Courtenay Fleetfoot of Pennyworth and the German Shorthaired Pointer Ch. Gretchenhof Columbia River for the titles, respectively. As of 2011, Storm remains in a group of only eight dogs who have won the Westminster show on more than one occasion, and the only Doberman to have done so.

Royal Doulton released a ceramic figurine of Storm between 1955 and 1985. By 2011, these figures were worth $165. Storm is one of only fourteen dogs inducted into the American Kennel Club's Hall of Fame at the Museum of the Dog in St. Louis, Missouri, having been inducted in 1993. He is one of only three show dogs to have been inducted, along with Ch. Bang Away of Sirrah Crest, a Boxer, and Ch. Vin-Melca's Vagabond, a Norwegian Elkhound.

== Pedigree ==
Westphalia's Uranus
Ch. Alcor v. Millsdod
Ch. Maida v. Coldad
Ch. Rancho Dobe's Primo
Ch. Roxanna's Emperor V Reemon
Ch. Rancho Dobe's Kashmir
Rhumba of Rancho Dobe
Ch. Rancho Dobe's Storm
Ferry v. Rauhfelsen of Giralda
Mr Butch Rittenhouse
Kara Vom Nanjahof
Ch. Maedel v. Randahof
Ch. Muck v. Brunia
Ch. Indra v. Lindenhof
Mitzi of Lawnwood
