= CVM =

CVM may refer to:

== Veterinary medicine ==
- California Variegated Mutant, a sheep breed
- Center for Veterinary Medicine of U.S. FDA
- Cervical Vertebral Malformation or wobbler disease of dogs and horses
- Complex vertebral malformation of Holstein cattle

== Other uses ==
- Christian Vision for Men, a UK charity
- Climate Vulnerability Monitor
- Securities Commission (Brazil) (Comissão de Valores Mobiliários)
- Cooperation and Verification Mechanism of EU applicant state
- General Pedro J. Méndez International Airport in Ciudad Victoria, Mexico, IATA code CVM
- Société des Chemins de fer vicinaux du Mayumbe, a former railway company (1898–1936) in the Congo Free State (now Democratic Republic of the Congo); see Mayumbe line
- Customer value maximization
- CVM, the ship hull classification symbol for "multi-role aircraft carriers" in the Japan Maritime Self-Defense Force (officially "aircraft-carrying multi-role escort ship")
