= Ferry v. Rauhfelsen of Giralda =

Doberman Pinscher dog (1937–1943)

Ch. Ferry v. Rauhfelsen of Giralda
- Other name: Ferry
- Species: Canis lupus familiaris
- Breed: Doberman Pinscher
- Sex: Male
- Born: 9 January 1937; Germany
- Died: 1943
- Occupation: Show dog
- Title: Best In Show at the Westminster Dog Show
- Term: 1939
- Predecessor: Daro of Maridor (English Setter)
- Successor: Ch. My Own Brucie (American Cocker Spaniel)
- Owners: Willi Rothfuss; Geraldine Rockefeller Dodge; Harold Duffy
- Parents: Ch. Jessy v. Sonnenhoehe (sire); Ch. Troll v. Englesberg (dam)
- Offspring: Ch. Rancho Dobe's Storm (grandson)

Ch. Ferry v. Rauhfelsen of Giralda (9 January 1937 – 1943) also known as Ferry, a Doberman Pinscher, best known for being Best in Show at the Westminster Kennel Club Dog Show in both 1939 while owned by Geraldine Rockefeller Dodge. He was the grandfather of two-time champion, Rancho Dobe's Storm.

== Early life ==
Ferry was born in Germany on 9 January 1937 to dam Ch. Jessy v. Sonnenhoehe, a German dog, and sire Ch. Troll v. Englesberg, an American and Canadian champion. His dam is described by the Doberman Pinscher Club of America (DPCA) as the most important dam of her time, with around 80% of dogs polled at a DPCA Show in the 1940s being related to her. Willi Rothfuss was his breeder and original owner. He won the male class of a Doberman only show in 1938, a title of Dobermann Verein Sieger (DVS), at the same show his sister Freya won the female class. Although he was entered in that show, he was mainly kept as a pet.

== US Show history ==
Geraldine Rockefeller Dodge was looking for a dog to win the Westminster Kennel Club Dog Show, to repeat her 1932 success. Her dog handler, McClure Halley, was sent to Europe to find the best dog he could, and returned with Ferry to Dodge's surprise as she was not expecting a Doberman Pinscher.

He arrived in the USA just before the 1939 Westminster show and was promptly entered in it. He won his breed, and the Working Group, qualifying him for the Best in Show round where he faced a Cocker Spaniel, a Beagle, a Smooth Fox Terrier, a Yorkshire Terrier and a Standard Poodle. He won the title, and went on to win a further twelve Best in Shows out of the thirteen shows he entered whilst in Dodge's ownership. These wins included the International Kennel Club of Chicago Dog Show, and the Rochester Kennel Club show. He was not entered in Westminster in the following year. Issues with Ferry's temperament were noted, and reported his Westminster Best in Show judge could not touch him. His second place showing was at the Chicago show in 1940, being beaten by the English Setter Maro of Maridor in the Best in Show round.

Dodge announced Ferry's retirement and sold him to L. R. "Jim" Randle, from San Francisco, to replace his dog Ch. Jockel v Burgund. He was given to handler Russell Zimmerman to show him in conformation shows throughout the Western United States. When Zimmerman was unavailable, Ben Brown would handle him. Reportedly Ferry attempted to intimidate Brown by charging at him when he let him out of the crate on the first occasion. After shutting the crate door in Ferry's face three times, he and Brown became good friends and Brown described him as one of the best dogs he ever handled.

Ferry changed handlers on several more occasions until he was in the hands of Harold Duffy. He was found in Duffy's kennels dead at the age of six and a half, a necropsy reported that he had been beaten to death.

== Legacy ==
He was used at stud several times while in the Western United States, producing litters for several kennels. One such Kennel was Rancho Dobe, and Ferry's grandson Ch. Rancho Dobe's Storm went on to win Best in Show twice at the Westminster Show, one of only eight dogs to have done so.

== Pedigree ==
Luz v. Rödeltal
Ch. Muck v. Brunia
Hella v.d. Winterburg
Ch. Sgr Troll v. Englesberg
DV Sgr Artus v.d. Thumshöhe
Adda v. Heek
Algunde v. Bülow
Ch. Ferry v. Rauhfelsen of Giralda
Sgr Helios v. Siegestor
Ch. Cherloc v. Rauhfelsen
Prinzess v. Simmenau
Ch. Sgrn Jessy v. Sonnenhoehe, TD
Ch Dewald v. Ludwigsburg
Alice v.d. Sonnenhöhe
Asta II v.d. Sonnenhöhe
