= My Own Brucie =

American Cocker Spaniel (1935–1943)

Ch. My Own Brucie
- Species: Canis lupus familiaris
- Breed: American Cocker Spaniel
- Sex: Male
- Born: May 4, 1935
- Died: June 9, 1943 (aged 8)
- Occupation: Show dog
- Title: Best in Show at the Westminster Kennel Club Dog Show
- Term: 1940–1941
- Predecessor: Ferry v. Rauhfelsen of Giralda (Doberman Pinscher)
- Successor: Ch. Wolvey Pattern of Edgerstoune (West Highland White Terrier)
- Owners: Herman Mellenthin; Peter Garvan
- Parents: Ch. Red Brucie (sire); Ch. My Own Lady Huntington (dam)

Ch. My Own Brucie (May 4, 1935–June 9, 1943) was a male American Cocker Spaniel who was the Best in Show at the Westminster Kennel Club Dog Show in 1940 and 1941. He was sired by popular sire Red Brucie and died as a result of a kidney and liver ailment. Obituaries described him as the most photographed dog in the world.

== Early life ==
My Own Brucie was the youngest son of Red Brucie, a dog that sired 36 champions. Red Brucie was considered by dog breeders of the time to be the father of the modern Cocker Spaniel, something which is referred to as the popular sire effect.

My Own Brucie was reported to have a stubborn streak, and on occasion even his owner could not change the dog's mind.

== Show career ==
In 1938, he became Best American Bred Sporting Dog of the Year, awarded by the American Kennel Club. In 1939, he won his first group at Westminster and went on to win a best in show at the Morris and Essex Kennel Club.

In the best in show class at Westminster in 1940, Brucie faced a Saluki, a Brussels Griffon, a Boxer, a Chow Chow and a Smooth Fox Terrier. The terrier, Ch. Normay Saddler, had been judged best in show at 51 different shows. Dr. Samuel Milbank conducted the judging and said of My Own Brucie, "He was in the most beautiful bloom, he is a real champion."

Brucie was the first dog to win the Sporting Group and the McGivern Challenge Bowl at Westminster on successive occasions and one of only two dogs to have won this group on three successive occasions. The other dog to match that achievement was Gordon Setter Ch. Bit O Gold Titan Treasure between 1997 and 1999.

At the time of his victory at Westminster in 1941, Brucie lived part-time at a Long Island kennel and part-time at his owner's home in Poughkeepsie, New York. His owner, Herman Mellenthin, had refused several large offers for him, including one for $10,000 and one for $15,000. Following his third victory, he and his owner were honored with a testimonial dinner in his hometown. These victories came during a period when the American Cocker Spaniel was the most popular breed in America.

== After Westminster ==
By the time of his death, at the age of 8 to a kidney and liver ailment, he was owned by Sgt. and Mrs. Peter Garvan of Roslyn, New York following the death of Herman Mellenthin in 1942. His death was considered untimely as he had only reached middle age for his breed.

Following his death, obituaries were published on the front page of the New York Evening Sun, the New York Times, and The Montreal Gazette, which called him the most photographed dog in the world.

== See also ==
- List of individual dogs
