= Carl Beech =

British minister

- Born: 19 February 1972 (age 54); Essex
- Education: Spurgeon's Theological College
- Occupations: President of CVM, Author, Broadcaster, Pastor
- Spouse: Karen
- Website: www.carlbeech.com

Carl Beech (born 19 February 1972) is President of Christian Vision for Men, having formerly been General Director, an evangelical movement focused on evangelism to men. In 2014, he founded The Gathering for Men, an annual Christian men's weekend festival. Beech is also the founder of the Codelife movement, which aims to encourage men to spend more time reading the Bible.

Beech was converted to Christianity at the age of 18. After studying a degree in engineering he worked as a financial consultant, church planter, youth worker, and senior pastor. Beech was the National Director, and subsequently General Director, of Christian Vision for Men between 2005 and 2015.

Beech sits on the councils of student movement Fusion and Restored, an international Christian alliance working to transform relationships and end violence against women. Until September 2016, Beech sat on the council of the Evangelical Alliance. He has written a number of books, including Man Prayer Manual: How. When. Why. He is a contributor to Sorted magazine and a columnist for iBelieve magazine. In February and March 2008, a two-part featured interview with Beech for Christianity Magazine about outreach to men was also published on video on Premier.TV.

Beech hosts a weekly radio show called ShedTalk on Premier Christian Radio with Dave Lodge and Jeremy Geake from Christian Vision for Men.

== Personal life ==
Beech is married to Karen. In 2008 he cycled from Land's End to John o' Groats, Calais to Nice and the length of Italy, each in nine days and in 2016, he cycled 850 km from Port Elizabeth to Cape Town to raise money for The Message Trust.

== Bibliography ==
- Spadework: Laying Foundations with 52 Men from the Bible, 144 pp, Scripture Union, 2007.
- Groundbreaker: Real Life Stories – Then and Now, 32pp, Scripture Union, 2007.
- Real Men, Real God, Real Spirit, 28pp, Grove Books Ltd, 2008.
- The Code, 127pp, Monarch Books (Lion Hudson), 2011.
- 52 Men of the Bible, 144pp, CWR, 2014.
- Man Prayer Manual: How. When. Why, 176pp, CWR, 2016.
