= American Cocker Spaniel =

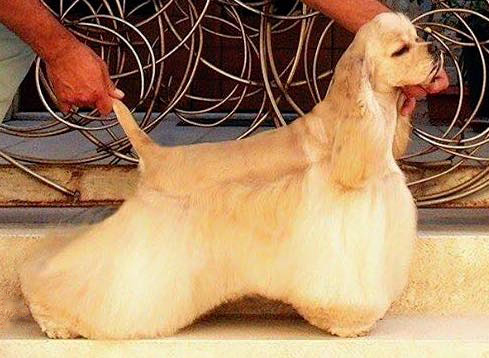
- An American Cocker Spaniel Crufts winning.
- Other names: Cocker Spaniel (in USA), Cocker, Merry Cocker.
- Origin: United States
Traits
- Coat: medium-length, thick, long
- Color: White, black, brown, tan, gray, red, fawn
Kennel club standards
- American Kennel Club: standard
- Fédération Cynologique Internationale: standard

The American Cocker Spaniel is a breed of sporting dog. It is a spaniel type dog that is closely related to the English Cocker Spaniel; the two breeds diverged during the 20th century due to differing breed standards in the US and the UK. In the United States, the breed is usually called a Cocker Spaniel, while elsewhere in the world, it is called an American Cocker Spaniel to distinguish it from its older English cousin. The word cocker is commonly held to stem from their use to hunt woodcock in England, while spaniel is thought to be derived from the breed's origins in Spain.

The first spaniel in America came across with the Mayflower in 1620, but it was not until 1878 that the first Cocker Spaniel was registered with the American Kennel Club (AKC). A national breed club was set up three years later and the dog considered to be the father of the modern breed, Ch. Obo II, was born around this time. By the 1920s the English and American varieties of Cocker had become noticeably different and in 1946 the AKC recognized the English type as a separate breed. It was not until 1970 that The Kennel Club in the UK recognized the American Cocker Spaniel as being separate from the English type. The American Cocker was the most popular breed in the United States during the 1940s and 1950s and again during the 1980s, reigning for a total of 18 years. They have also won the best in show title at the Westminster Kennel Club Dog Show on four occasions, the best in show title at Crufts in 2017, and have been linked to the President of the United States on several occasions, with owners including Richard Nixon and Harry S. Truman. In 2021, the cocker spaniel ranked 29th in registrations with the American Kennel Club.

The breed is the smallest of the sporting dogs recognized by the AKC, and its distinctly shaped head makes it immediately recognizable. In addition, there are some marked differences between it and its English relative. It has average working intelligence, although by being bred to a show standard it is no longer an ideal working dog. Members of the breed suffer from a wide variety of health ailments including problems with their hearts, eyes and ears.

== History ==
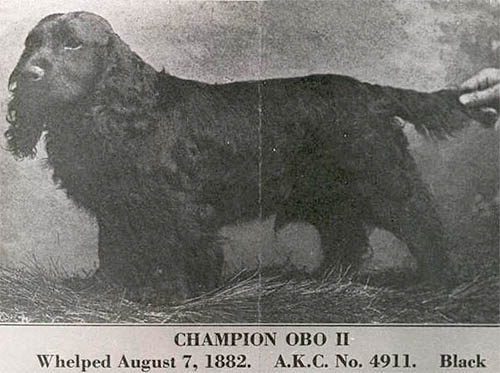
Ch. Obo II, considered to be the foundation sire of the American Cocker Spaniel.

The word spanyell is thought to date from the late 12th century when it was used to name a type of dog imported into England from Spain, with the span part of the word referring to the country of origin. Records from the mid-14th century show that selective breeding was already in place, with the breed being separated into two distinct types, called water spaniels and land spaniels. By 1801, the smaller variety of land spaniel was called the Cocker or Cocking Spaniel, so named for its use in flushing woodcock.

According to historical records, the first spaniel was brought to North America aboard the Mayflower which sailed from Plymouth, England and landed in New England in 1620. The first Cocker Spaniel recorded in America was a liver and white dog named Captain, who was registered with the American Kennel Club in 1878. In 1881, the American Cocker Spaniel Club was formed; it would later become the American Spaniel Club (ASC) and is now known as the oldest breed club for dogs in the United States. The task of the club was initially to create a standard to separate the Cocker Spaniel in America from other types of land spaniels, a task which would take over 20 years, only being completed in 1905.

The dog considered to be the father of the American Cocker Spaniel was sired by the dog considered to be the father of the English Cocker Spaniel. Ch. Obo was bred to Ch. Chloe II, who was shipped to America while she was pregnant. Once in the United States, she whelped a dog who became Ch. Obo II. He differed greatly from the modern breed, being only 10 inches (25 cm) tall and with a long body, but was considered to be an excellent dog of that era and became a popular sire.

Towards the end of the 19th century, the breed had become popular in America and Canada due to their dual use as a family pet and a working dog. In the early 20th century the breeders on either side of the Atlantic had created different breed standards for the Cocker Spaniel and the breed gradually diverged from one another, with the two becoming noticeably different by the 1920s. The American Cockers by now had a smaller muzzle, their coats were softer and the dogs overall were lighter and smaller. The differences were so apparent that in 1935, breeders founded the English Cocker Spaniel Club and restricted breeding between the two types of spaniel. The two types of Cocker Spaniel in America were shown together as one breed, with the English type as a variety of the main breed, until 1946 when the American Kennel Club recognized the English Cocker Spaniel as a separate breed.

=== Return to the UK ===
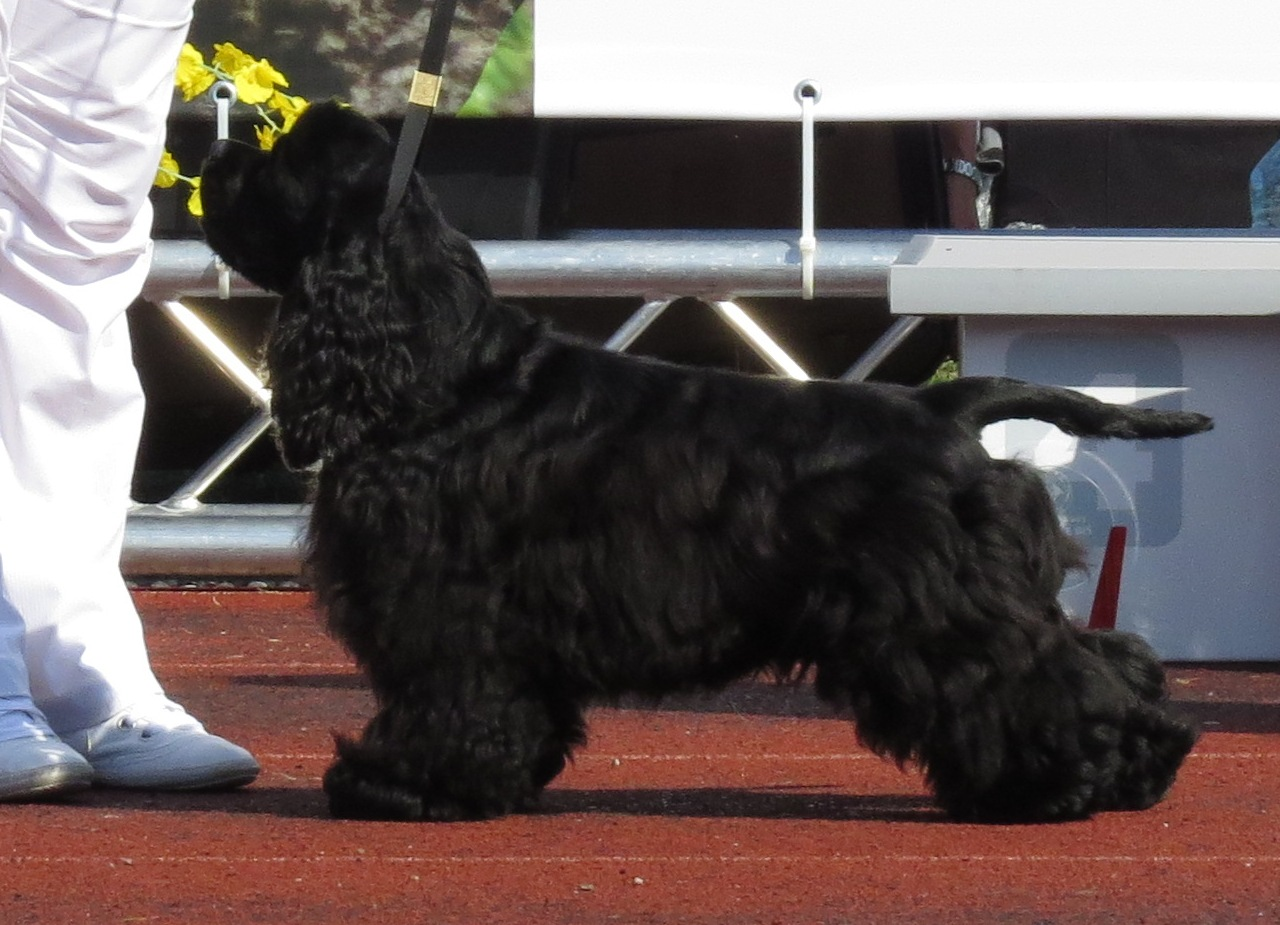
A black American Cocker Spaniel in a show cut.

In the United Kingdom, there were a few American Cockers that had accompanied service personnel to American bases in the 1950s and 1960s. Additionally, several came over with embassy staff and business people returning home.

The first UK Kennel Club registered American Cocker Spaniel was Aramingo Argonaught, born January 17, 1956, and bred by Herbert L. Steinberg. Two judges confirmed that the dog was an American Cocker and not an English Cocker before the Kennel Club permitted the dog to be shown. In the 1960s they were shown as a rare breed, which meant that they did not have a show class of their own and could only be shown in variety classes. This included Aramingo Argonaught, who was the first American Cocker Spaniel to be shown at Crufts in 1960 in a class entitled "Any variety not classified at this show". In 1968, the KC agreed to have the breed shown in the category "Any variety gundog other than Cocker" and stated that the American Cocker was not a variety of "Spaniel (Cocker)". There were around 100 registrations between 1966 and 1968.

In 1970 the breed was given a separate register in the Kennel Club Breed Supplement, as it was previously included in "Any other variety". Registration numbers increased to 309 by 1970 following this full recognition.

=== Notable American Cockers and popularity ===
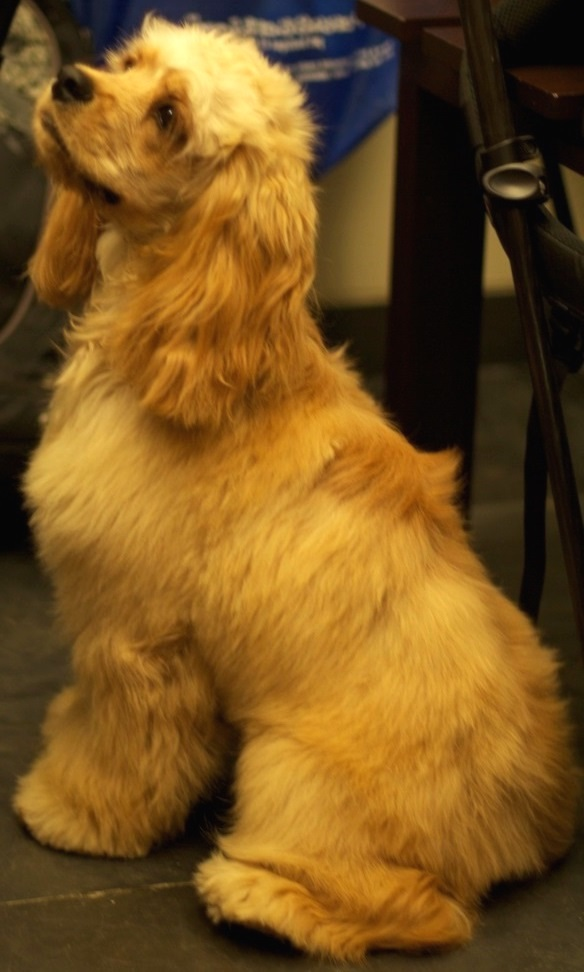
An American Cocker Spaniel with a golden coat.

American Cocker Spaniels have won best in show at the Westminster Dog Show on four occasions, with the first win in 1921 by Ch. Midkiff Seductive. Ch. My Own Brucie won the title twice in 1940 and 1941, and became known as the most photographed dog in the world.

Brucie's win in 1940 coincided with the American Cocker Spaniel becoming the most popular breed of dog in the United States, and they would remain the most popular until 1952. The breed won the title for the fourth time in 1954 with the victory going to Ch. Carmor's Rise and Shine. The popularity of the American Cocker increased once again in the 1980s with it becoming the most popular breed again from 1984 until 1990. In more recent years the popularity of the breed has decreased, with it ranked 15th most popular by the American Kennel Club in 2005, and 32nd in 2024. The breeds most recent victory came in 2017 when it won the best in show title at Crufts.

American Cocker Spaniels have had several links to the United States Presidency. In 1952, an American Cocker Spaniel became a household name when United States Senator Richard Nixon made his Checkers speech on September 23. A parti-colored American Cocker Spaniel named Dot was one of several dogs owned by Rutherford B. Hayes; and a buff colored dog named Feller caused a scandal for Harry S. Truman when the dog was received as an unwanted gift with the President subsequently giving it away to a White House physician. More recently, a Cocker named Zeke lived with Bill Clinton while he was the governor of Arkansas.

== Appearance ==
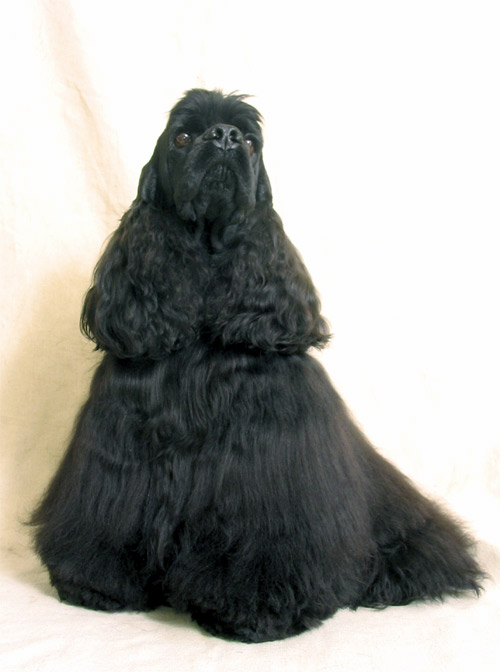
A black American Cocker Spaniel.

The American Cocker Spaniel is the smallest dog recognized by the American Kennel Club as a sporting dog, being on average between 13.5 and 15.5 inches (34 and 39 cm) high at the withers. It is a dog of normal proportions, with medium long silky fur on the body and ears, hanging down on the legs and belly (known as feathering). The ears hang down. The breed standard states that size over 15.5 inches (39 cm) inches for males and 14.5 inches (37 cm) for females is a disqualification at conformation shows. American Cocker Spaniels weigh around 24 to 30 pounds (11 to 14 kg) on average, with females of the breed usually weighing slightly less than the males.

The head of an American Cocker Spaniel makes the breed immediately recognizable, with the rounded dome of the skull, well-pronounced stop, and a square shaped lip. The drop ears are long, low set, with long silky fur, and the eyes are dark, large, and rounded. The nose can be black or brown depending on the color of the breed.

The coat of the breed come in a variety of shades with the colors being separated into three main groups: black or black and tan, any solid color other than black (ASCOB), and parti-color. The black variety is either all black, or with tan points on the dog's head, the feet and the tail in a pattern called black and tan. The group known as ASCOB includes all other solid colors from light cream through to dark red, although some lighter coloring is allowed on the feathering according to standards. Parti-colored dogs are white with patches of another color such as black or brown, and includes any roan colored dogs. In addition, American Cockers coats can come in a pattern known as merle, which is not recognized by the American Kennel Club.

American Cockers have rounder eyes, a domed skull, shorter muzzle and more clearly pronounced eyebrows than the English Cockers, whose head is more setter-like. In colors, the roan colors are rarer in the American variety than in the English but the shade of buff which is common in the American is not seen in the English breed at all, although there are English Cocker Spaniels which are considered to be a shade of red. The English breed is also slightly larger, being between 14.5–15.5 inches (37–39 cm) in height.

American Cocker Spaniel

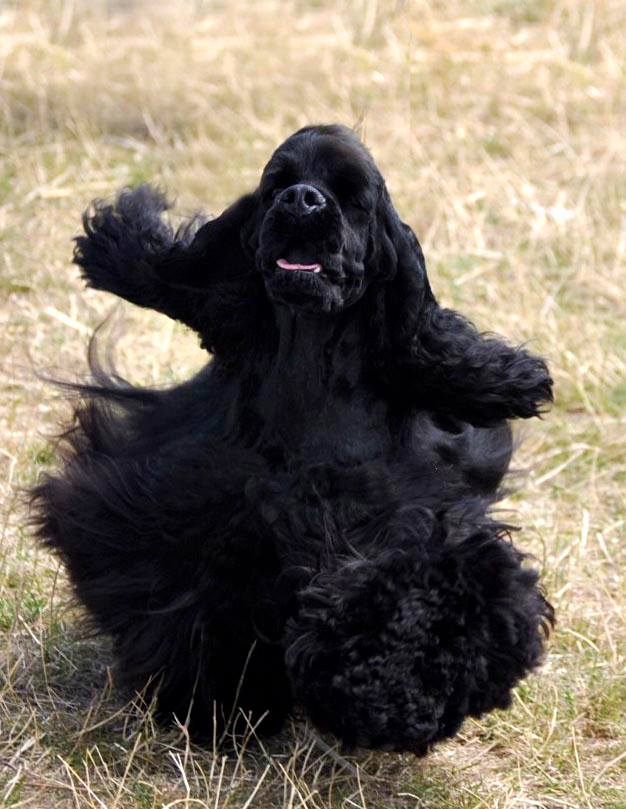
A black female.

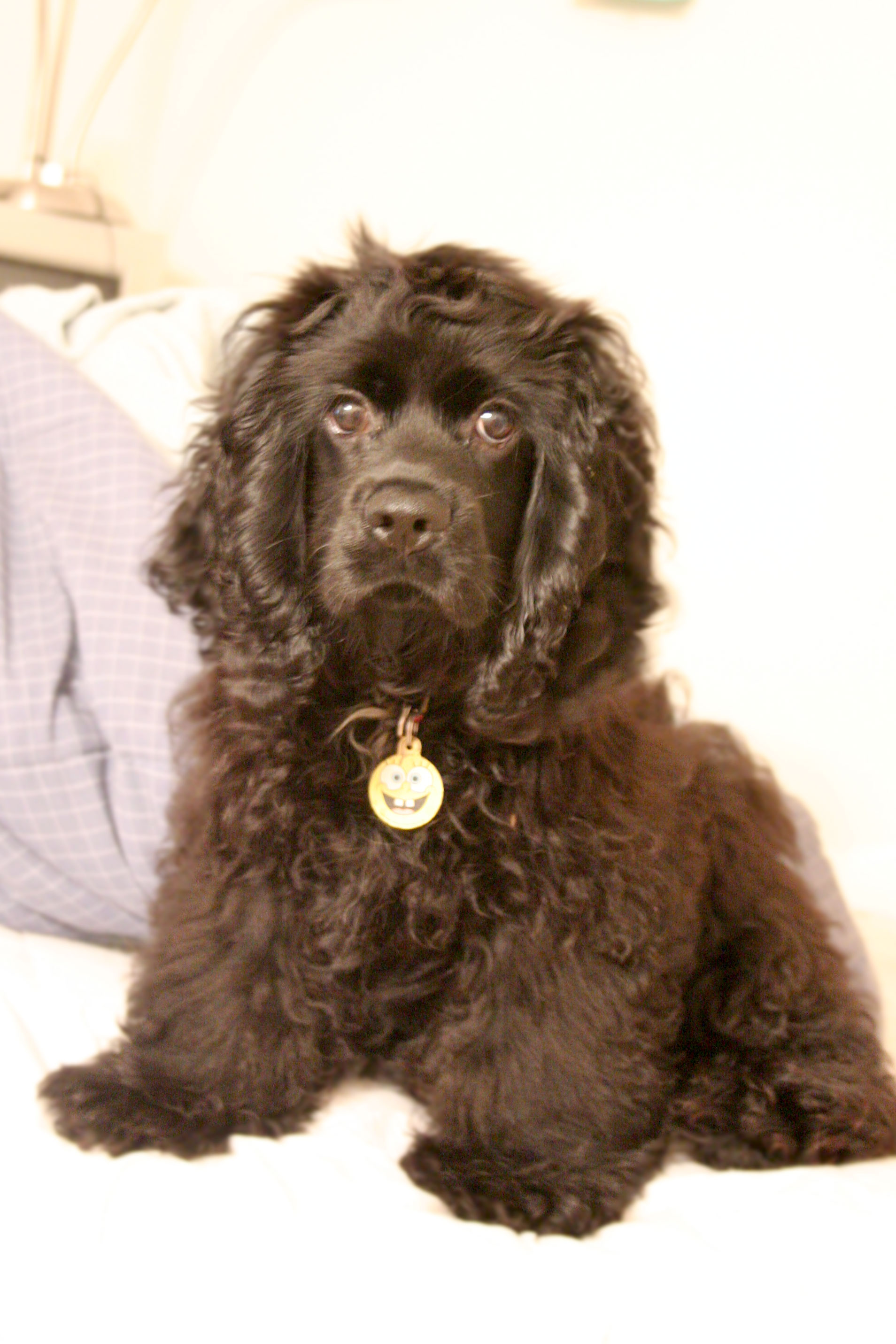
American Cocker Spaniel puppy with brown coat.

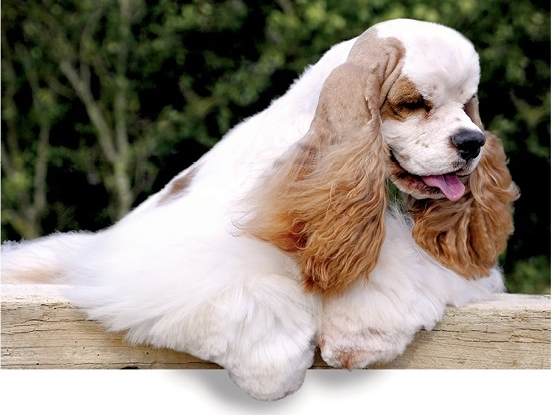
A particolor dog.

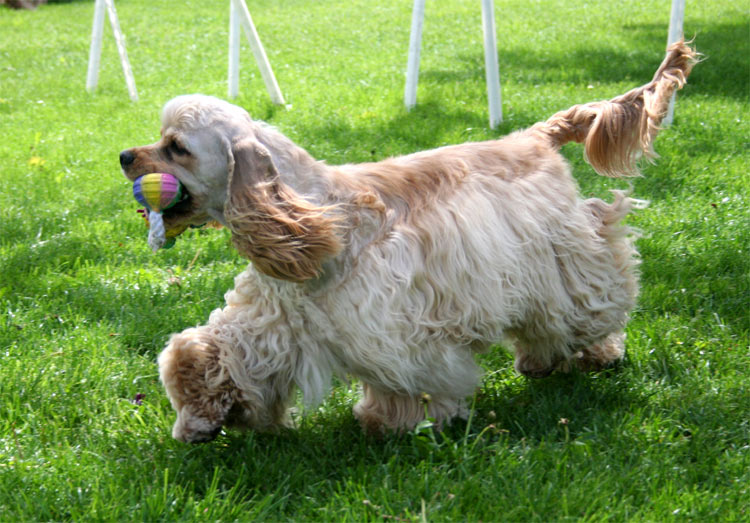
A buff-colored American Cocker Spaniel.

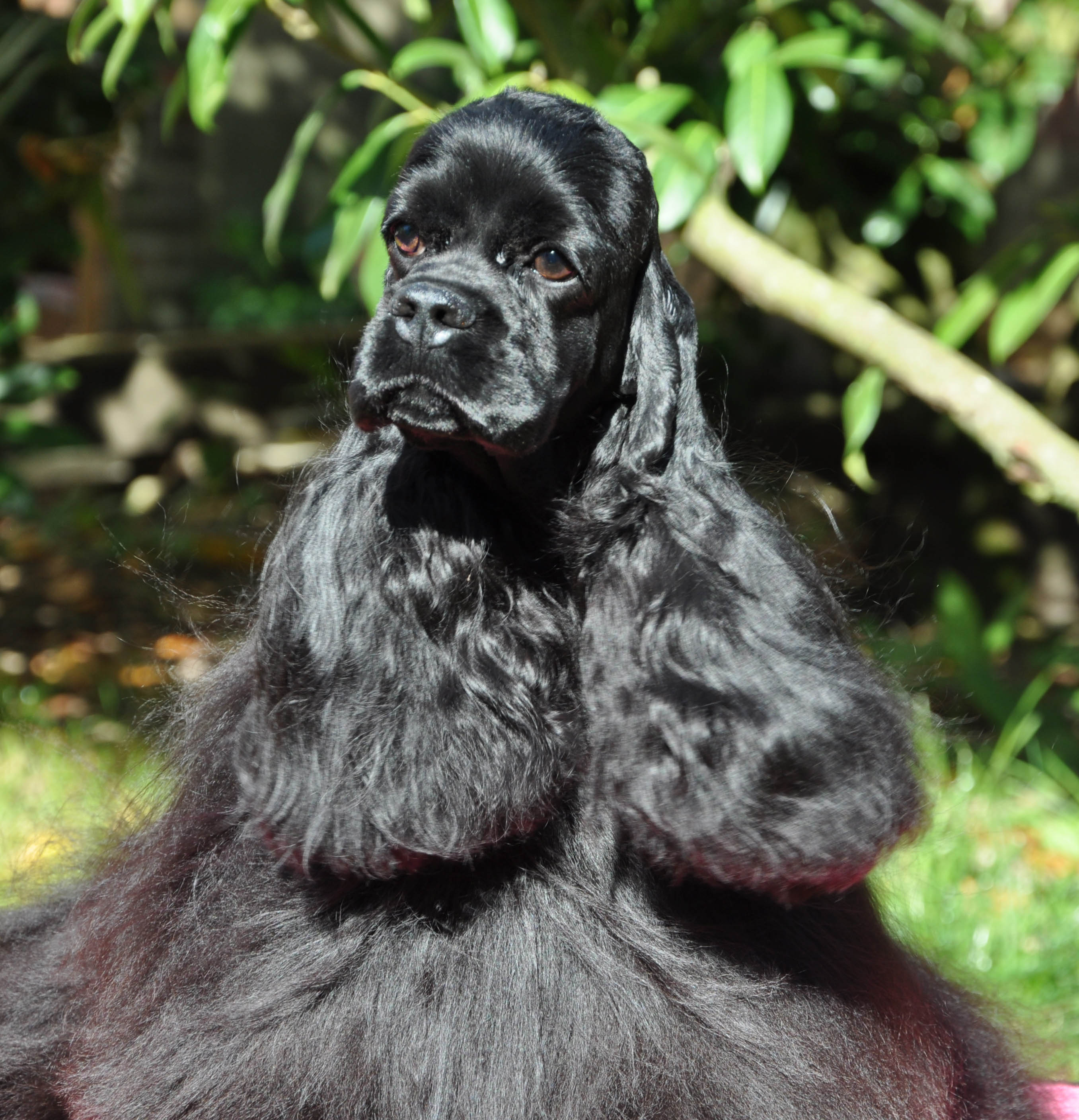
Head of a black female.

== Temperament ==
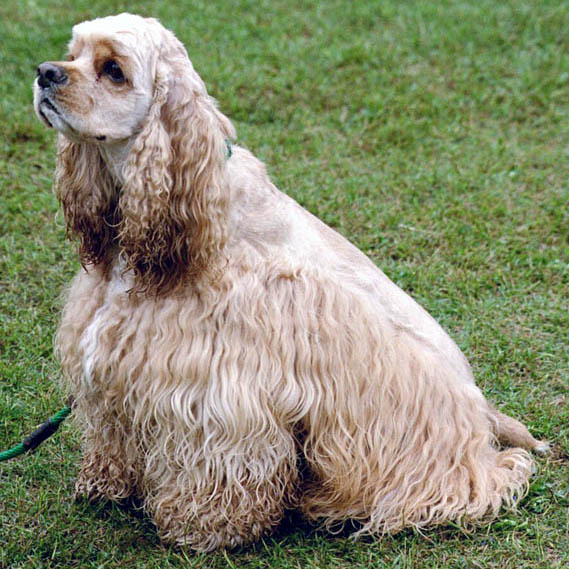
An American cocker spaniel.

Known as the "Merry Cocker", the American Cocker Spaniel breed standard defines the ideal dog of the breed as being "equable in temperament with no suggestion of timidity." The breed ranks 20th in Stanley Coren's The Intelligence of Dogs, a rating that indicates good "Working or Obedience Intelligence", or trainability. IQ tests run on a variety of breeds in the 1950s and 1960s showed that the American Cocker performed the best when tested on its ability to show restraint and delayed response to a trigger, a trait which was put down to the breed's bred-in ability when hunting to freeze upon finding a bird before flushing it out on command. However, they proved to be the worst breed tested when it came to manipulating objects with their paws, for instance uncovering a dish of food or pulling on a string.

With appropriate early socialization, the American Cocker Spaniel can live successfully with adults, children, other dogs, and other household pets. The breed is generally people-oriented and tends to prefer regular human companionship rather than prolonged isolation. Some individuals may be sensitive to loud noises or rough handling.

Members of the breed were originally used as hunting dogs, but increased in popularity as a show dog. It was bred more and more in conformation with the breed standard, resulting in certain attributes, such as a long coat, which no longer make it an ideal working dog.

== Health ==
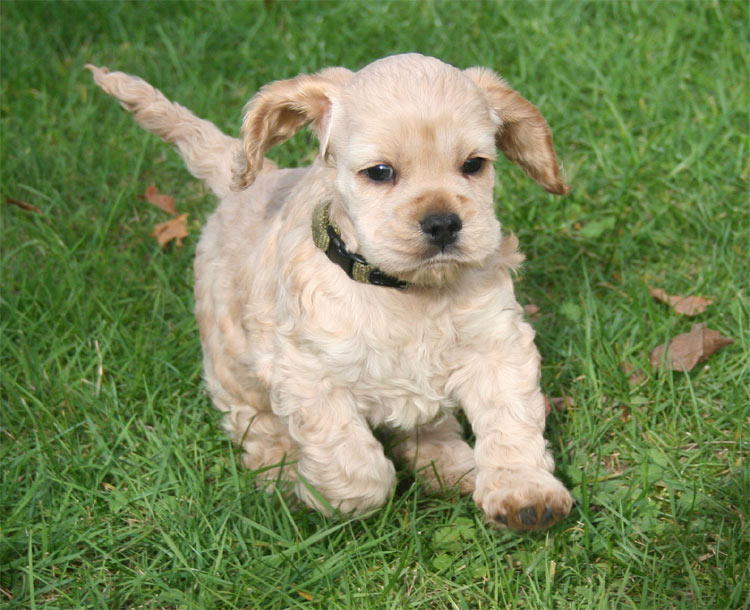
An American Cocker Spaniel puppy.

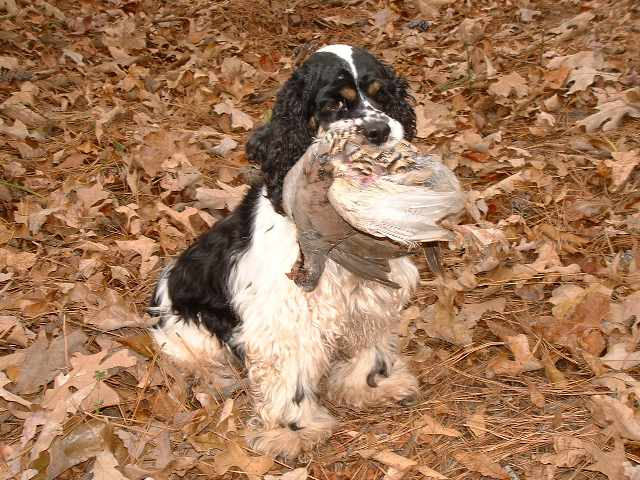
An American Cocker Spaniel used as a hunting dog.

A 2024 study in the UK found a life expectancy of 13.3 years for the breed compared to an average of 12.7 for purebreeds and 12 for crossbreeds.

The American Cocker Spaniel is one of the more commonly affected breeds for progressive rod-cone degeneration. An autosomal recessive mutation in the PRCD gene is responsible for the condition in the breed. A study in the US veterinary data found the American Cocker Spaniel to be predisposed to glaucoma with 5.52% of dogs having the condition, the greatest prevalence of all breeds.

American Cocker Spaniels can present with a nutritional form of dilated cardiomyopathy that is associated with low blood concentrations of the amino acid taurine. This form of dilated cardiomyopathy is in many cases reversible if the dog receives taurine supplementation.

The American Cocker Spaniel is predisposed to the following dermatological conditions: allergic skin disease, intertrigo, Malassezia dermatitis, melanoma, otitis externa, plasmacytoma, primary keratinisation defects, sebaceous adenoma, and vitamin A-responsive dermatosis.

The American Cocker Spaniel is predisposed to hypothyroidism.

A North American study looking at records of over a million dogs and 44,000 American Cocker Spaniels found the breed to have a lower occurrence of hip dysplasia with 0.87% compared to 3.52% overall.

== In popular culture ==
- The film Lady and the Tramp features the character Lady, who is an American Cocker Spaniel.
  - In the live-action remake of the same name, Lady is portrayed by an American Cocker Spaniel named Rose.
- Trilby from the Australian-American TV series Raggs is an American Cocker Spaniel.
- Mags from Turbo Dogs is an American Cocker Spaniel.
- In Poppy Playtime, a character in the Smiling Critters named Dogday is an American Cocker Spaniel.
