= PRCD =

Protein-coding gene in the species Homo sapiens

Identifiers
- Aliases: PRCD, RP36, progressive rod-cone degeneration, photoreceptor disc component
- External IDs: OMIM: 610598; MGI: 3649529; HomoloGene: 135617; GeneCards: PRCD; OMA:PRCD - orthologs

Gene location (Human)
Chr.	Chromosome 17 (human)
Band	17q25.1	Start	76,527,586 bp
Band	17q25.1	End	76,553,578 bp

Gene location (Mouse)
Chr.	Chromosome 11 (mouse)
Band	11 E2|11	Start	116,544,360 bp
Band	11 E2|11	End	116,559,215 bp
RNA expression pattern
Bgee	Human / Mouse (ortholog); Top expressed in: right hemisphere of cerebellum; C1 segment; substantia nigra; Brodmann area 9; hypothalamus; right auricle of heart; cardiac muscle tissue of right atrium; canal of the cervix; right frontal lobe; corpus callosum / Top expressed in: neural layer of retina; retinal pigment epithelium; Epithelium of choroid plexus; epithelium of lens; iris; ciliary body; adrenal gland; embryo; ovary; left lung lobe; More reference expression data
BioGPS	n/a
Gene ontology
Molecular function	opsin binding
Cellular component	photoreceptor outer segment; cytoplasm; extracellular region; endoplasmic reticulum; Golgi apparatus; photoreceptor outer segment membrane; membrane; cell projection
Biological process	response to stimulus; visual perception
Sources:Amigo / QuickGO
Orthologs
Species	Human	Mouse
Entrez	768206	100038570
Ensembl	ENSG00000214140	ENSMUSG00000075410
UniProt	Q00LT1	Q00LT2
RefSeq (mRNA)	NM_001077620	NM_001163318
RefSeq (protein)	NP_001071088	NP_001156790
Location (UCSC)	Chr 17: 76.53 – 76.55 Mb	Chr 11: 116.54 – 116.56 Mb
PubMed search
- Wikidata
View/Edit Human	View/Edit Mouse

Progressive rod-cone degeneration is a protein in humans that is encoded by the PRCD gene.

This gene is predominantly expressed in the retina, and mutations in this gene are the cause of autosomal recessive retinal degeneration in both humans and dogs. Alternatively spliced transcript variants have been found for this gene. [provided by RefSeq, Mar 2010].
