= Christian Vision for Men =

CVM (Christian Vision for Men)
- Founded: 1989
- Founder: Max Sinclair
- Type: Evangelical Christian Movement
- Purpose: Evangelical Christianity
- Location: United Kingdom
- Origins: London
- Region served: United Kingdom
- Members: 2000+ churches
- Key people: Rev Carl Beech, Nathan Blackaby
- Employees: 8
- Volunteers: 100s
- Website: https://www.cvm.org.uk/
- Registered Charity number: 1071663

Christian Vision for Men (CVM) is a registered charity operating throughout the United Kingdom and based in Chesterfield. Its mission statement is to "connect men to Jesus and the church to men". It works with over 2,000 churches, mainly by having its materials used by the churches men's groups to achieve its aims.

== History ==
CVM was founded in 1989 by Max Sinclair. Until August 2006 it was known as Christian Viewpoint for Men, working alongside Christian Viewpoint for Women which is now known as Activate Your Life.

In 2006, Carl Beech became CEO, taking over from Richard Meryon who went to work at the Garden Tomb in Jerusalem. Beech moved to the newly created role of president In January 2015, being succeeded as CEO by Nathan Blackaby.

In 2009, CVM launched talkinghead, a website to capture video testimonies. In 2010 it started codelife, a simple list of twelve guidelines to help men live by Christian teachings.

CVM gained mainstream press coverage in 2010 when it recommended churches to invite men to showings of World Cup football matches.

== Conferences ==
Throughout the 21st century, CVM has held annual weekend conferences, initially at conference venues such as the Royal Court Hotel in Coventry (until 2007). An experiment in 2008 saw two smaller conferences run, at Cefn Lea Christian Conference Centre, Newtown, Wales, from 11–13 July, and aboard the vessel, 'Black Prince', sailing Liverpool – Dublin – Liverpool over the weekend 10–12 October.

The 2009 and 2010 conferences were held at Warwick Conference Centre.

In an effort to make the conferences accessible to the maximum number of men, whatever their status and particularly their income, the format was changed in 2011 to "The Gathering", a weekend camp near Highworth, Wiltshire. The event has grown year on year. In 2016 The Gathering was attended by 2,300 men.

One of CVM's regional events was reported in the press in 2011: "Kingdom Warriors", a conference at Southport.

== About ==
Under Carl Beech's leadership, CVM aimed to be more inclusive of a lower middle and working class constituency. Unlike many Christian events in the UK, there is a beer tent at The Gathering. The Codelife system is also aimed at giving a simpler message than the intellectual sermons of most evangelical churches.

CVM is a member of the UK Evangelical Alliance.
