= Complex vertebral malformation =

- Other names: CVM
- Specialty: Veterinary genetics
- Symptoms: Abnormal vertebrae, heart defects, low birth weight
- Usual onset: Prenatal
- Causes: Missense mutation in SLC35A3 gene
- Differential diagnosis: Other vertebral malformations
- Prevention: Genetic screening of breeding stock
- Treatment: None (lethal in homozygous individuals)
- Frequency: Prevalent in Holstein cattle

Complex vertebral malformation or CVM is a lethal hereditary syndrome found in Holstein cattle. CVM is responsible for malformed calves that are either spontaneously aborted or die shortly after birth. It is caused by a missense mutation in the SLC35A3 gene. Since the mutant form of the gene is recessive, only individuals carrying two copies of the faulty gene (homozygous individuals) are affected. Heterozygous individuals, those who carry one copy of the faulty gene and one copy of the normal gene, have no symptoms but may still pass the disease on to their offspring.

== Origin ==
CVM has been traced back to the bull Carlin-M Ivanhoe Bell who lived in the 1980s. He was used for two decades in international Holstein breeding for the exceptional milk production he passed on to his daughters. Unusually, Carlin-M Ivanhoe Bell was a carrier for two genetic diseases, CVM and Bovine leukocyte adhesion deficiency (BLAD). The BLAD and CVM genes are located in different chromosomes. When the sire (father) of Carlin-M Ivanhoe Bell, a bull named Penstate Ivanhoe Star, was tested he was found to be a carrier of both CVM and BLAD. Carlin-M Ivanhoe Bell's grandsire Osborndale Ivanhoe, however, carried only BLAD. Scientists therefore believe that the mutation responsible for CVM occurred either in Penstate Ivanhoe Star, or somewhere in his maternal family.

The CVM syndrome was first found in a Danish Holstein stock in 1999, and during the following years it was also found in the United States, United Kingdom, Netherlands, and Japan. Because of the wide international usage of Carlin-M Ivanhoe Bell and the large number of animals descending from him, the CVM gene is found in Holstein cattle throughout the world. By the turn of the 21st century, more than 30 percent of the best Holstein sires in both Denmark and Japan were CVM carriers.

A test for CVM was developed in the turn of the 21st century, and was first used in Denmark in 2000.

== Effects ==
CVM is caused by a missense mutation in the bovine SLC35A3 gene. The mutant protein has the amino acid phenylalanine at position 180 instead of valine. This causes abnormal nucleotide-sugar transport into the Golgi apparatus, leading to malformations of the vertebral column. CVM is the first genetic disorder found to be caused by defects in the SLC35A3 gene. The mutation responsible for CVM is recessively inherited, and heterozygous carriers of the mutation are asymptomatic. CVM analysis found the bovine SLC35A3 to be the first nucleotide-sugar transportation regulating gene also responsible in the formation of vertebrae and ribs.

CVM affects foetal development, being a cause of frequent abortions and stillbirths. Affected calves express low birth weight and a variety of malformations in the vertebrae and heart. Diagnose based on just visual examination of a calf may be difficult due to the wide variety in the expression of anomalies, and a definite diagnosis requires DNA testing.

=== Abortions ===
As many as 88 percent of homozygous, CVM-affected foetuses are spontaneously aborted within 260 days from the insemination. A normal bovine pregnancy lasts 280 days. Only 4-5 percent of CVM affected foetuses are calved alive. These calves however are nonviable.

=== Malformations ===
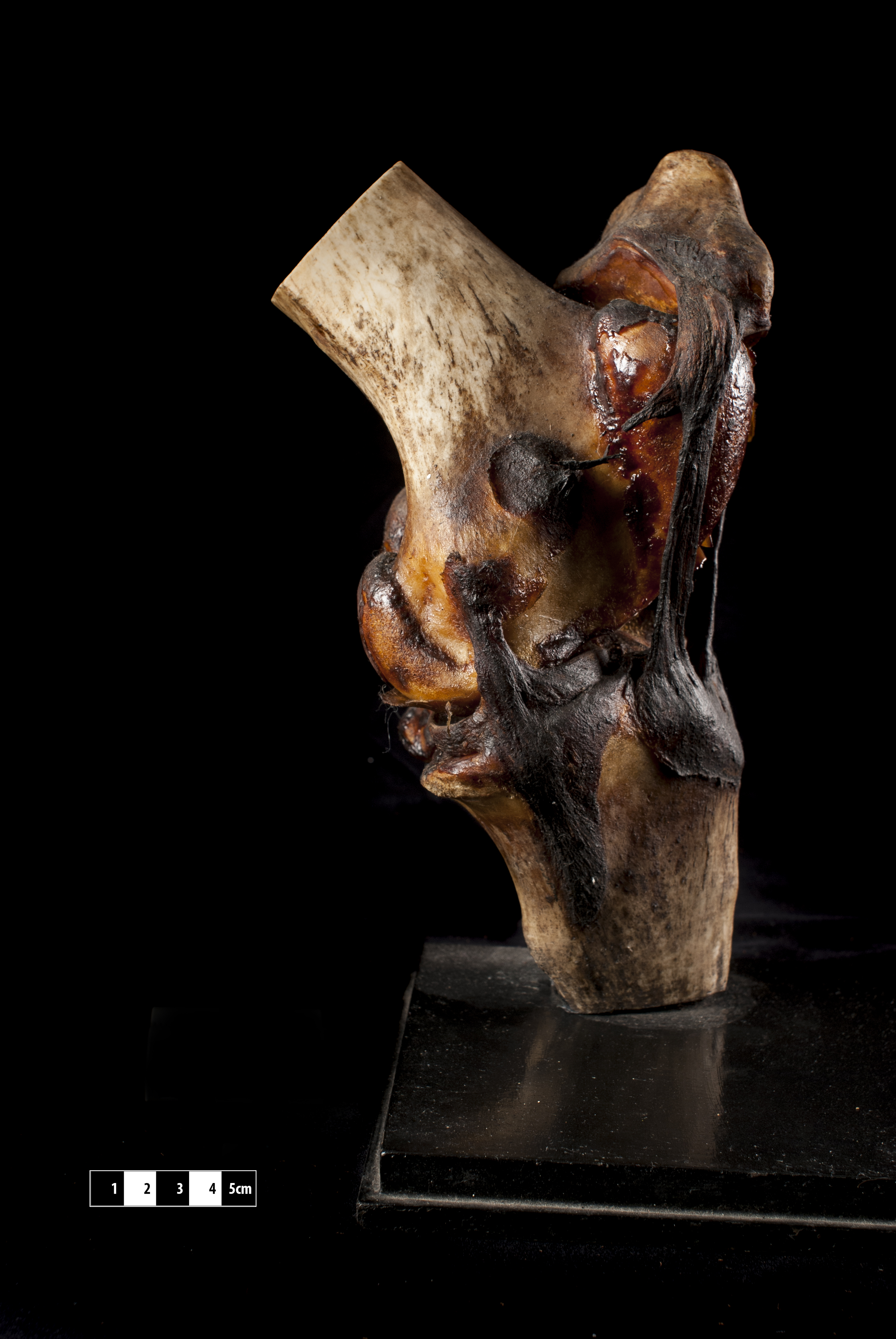
Articulation of the bovine metacarpal.

A CVM affected calf typically has an abnormally short neck and crooked pasterns. Other malformations associated with CVM are malformations or fusing of vertebrae, scoliosis, contraction and crookedness of distal joints, and abnormal shape of head. Hearts of CVM affected calves have been found to have, among other, abnormal placement of main vessels.

=== Production and breeding ===
CVM is a cause of multiple problems for a cattle farmer. A CVM carrier cow's fertility is 25% lower than normal, and abortions lead to lowered milk production. For these reasons, CVM carriers are often culled.

CVM carrier bulls have been pre-eliminated in Europe since the turn of the 21st century. Older stud bulls were also tested, and some of the best animals were found to be carriers. This culling led to a period of slowed progress in dairy breeding in a number of European countries.
