= Popular sire effect =

Genetic effect in animal breeding

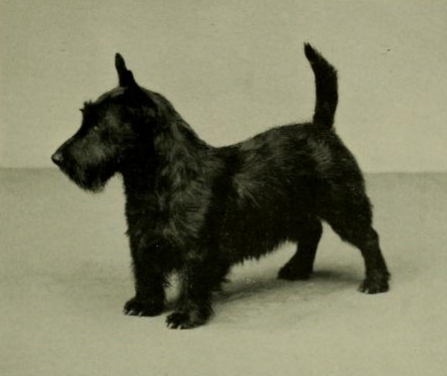
This popular Scottish Terrier had sired three champions and nine winners of championship points or certificates by the age of three.

The popular sire effect (or popular stud/sire syndrome) occurs when an animal with desirable attributes is bred repeatedly. In dog breeding, a male dog that wins respected competitions becomes highly sought after, as breeders believe the sire possesses the genes necessary to produce champions. However, the popular sire effect is not just down to wanting to produce a champion. For example, in Staffordshire Bull Terriers there are several popular sires who are used by breeders to produce specific colours that are not favoured in the show ring. The popular sire is often bred extensively with many females. This can cause undetected, undesirable genetic traits in the stud to spread rapidly within the gene pool. It can also reduce genetic diversity by the exclusion of other males.

While a popular stud can sire a large number of litters, the effect of a popular dam is more limited. The constraints of the female reproductive cycle requires dams to have several months in between each litter so, even at capacity, a dam would not be able to parent as many offspring as a sire; furthermore, a dam bred repeatedly may experience a sharp decline in her litter count due to a weaker body caused by too many consecutive pregnancies.

== Genetic consequences ==
Genetic diversity in a population is dependent on the cumulative effects of mutation, natural selection, and population size over many generations. The effective population size (N_{e}) is the number of individuals in a given population that are able to reproduce and contribute offspring to the next generation. Genetic diversity decays over generations at a rate that is inversely related to the effective population size. In small populations, a major factor that causes a loss of genetic diversity is inbreeding. Intentionally breeding for desirable attributes in a species is known as selective breeding. This process artificially limits the size of the population pool, thereby increasing the rates of inbreeding as well as inbreeding depression, and decreasing a species biological fitness.

Deleterious mutations in dominant traits are removed from the gene pool by natural selection when the affected individual fails to successfully pass the gene onto the next generation. Recessive mutations, on the other hand, are only expressed and selected against in homozygous recessive individuals; thus, they can be silently passed onto the next generation in heterozygous individuals. Excessive breeding of any one dog will cause an extraordinary dose of his genes, including any deleterious recessive alleles he may carry, to be contributed to the gene pool. The accumulation of these recessive mutations in the reproducing individuals of a population can cause breed-related diseases in future generations through a phenomenon known as the founder effect.

Diseases attributed to the popular sire effect include copper toxicosis in Bedlington Terriers, rage syndrome in English Springer Spaniels, and histiocytic sarcoma in Bernese Mountain Dogs. Pedigree analysis of Bernese Mountain Dogs in France showed that only 5.5% of males and 13.2% of females are used for reproduction each generation, with 0.78% of males and 3% of females producing more than 50% of the next generation. Because the offspring and grand-offspring of sires turn out good, breeders often breed them to each other and conduct additional backcrosses for generations. Sometimes a sire will be bred so extensively that, decades later, breeders may not be able to tell just how closely related their dogs are, as the sire's history has run off their pedigree. This happened with the Australian Shepherd, with most show-line Aussies tracing back, repeatedly, to two full brothers: Wildhagen's Dutchman of Flintridge and Fieldmaster of Flintridge.

In Quarter Horses, hyperkalemic periodic paralysis (HYPP), an autosomal dominant disorder of potassium regulation, can be linked back to a single Quarter Horse sire called Impressive. Also known as Impressive syndrome, HYPP causes heavy muscling in carrier horses, which is a desirable trait in the show ring. However, homozygotes can suffer from severe disease, which manifests as attacks of muscle twitching, weakness, collapse, and death. The disease became widespread when Quarter Horse breeders began selecting for muscling; by 2003, Impressive had over 55,000 descendants. Quarter Horses are now routinely screened for the HYPP gene prior to breeding.

A study of 10 breeds from the UK's Kennel Club (KC) showed that on average 20% of dogs have recorded offspring. Golden Retrievers have the lowest proportion of male dogs that are sires (5%), and discounting the greyhound (most greyhounds are not registered with the KC), the Akita Inus the highest (13%). A study of three varieties of terrier in 1914 indicates that about 8% of stud dogs (21 individuals) account for 23% of puppies (451 individuals), an average of 21.5 individuals per stud. In comparison, the UK study showed that 5% of Labrador males and 10% of Golden Retrievers sired more than 100 individuals each. The most popular dam (a Labrador Retriever) carried 72 offspring, while the most popular stud (an English Springer Spaniel) sired 2,538 offspring. In many breeds, more than 90% of unique genetic variants are lost over six generations.

== Mitigation methods ==
The Association of Zoos and Aquariums maintains studbooks for their captive species, which contain the genetic and demographic identity of a population and can serve as valuable tools for tracking and managing each individual in an ex situ population. Studbooks and other forms of pedigree tracking can be useful tools to combat the problem of the popular sire effect and advise breeding decisions that will enhance genetic diversity.

The Doberman Pinscher breed is overwhelmingly affected by von Willebrand disease, an autosomal recessive bleeding disorder; genetic testing has revealed that the detrimental gene is present in 77% of Dobermans. To decrease the frequency of the defective gene, Doberman breeders can breed carriers of the gene with unaffected individuals, and subsequently breed the non-carrier offspring. In any population that is overly-inbred and at risk, breeders should run pedigree analyses and genetic testing for deleterious alleles in each individual before making their breeding decisions.

Actions to limit the use of popular sires have been recommended to reduce the loss of genetic diversity in individual breeds. Such limits are in effect in German Shepherd Dogs in Germany. The Norwegian Kennel Club recommends that no individual dog should have more offspring than the equivalent of 5% of the number of puppies registered in its breed during a five-year period. The Fédération Cynologique Internationale adopted the same recommendation in March 2010.

== See also ==
- Complex vertebral malformation, a widespread lethal genetic disease in Holstein cattle traced back to popular sire Carlin-M Ivanhoe Bell.
- Founder effect
- Population bottleneck
- Artificial selection
